= 1994 Hounslow London Borough Council election =

1994 local election in England

← 1990	5 May 1994	1998 →

All 60 seats up for election to Hounslow London Borough Council 31 seats needed for a majority
- Registered: 148,969
- Turnout: 66,876, 44.89% (▼4.02)

	First party	Second party	Third party
Leader	John Chatt	Unknown	Unknown
Party	Labour	Conservative	Liberal Democrats
Leader since	9 May 1991	Unknown	Unknown
Leader's seat	Feltham North	Unknown	Unknown
Last election	44 seats, 49.49%	15 seats, 38.12%	1 seat, 8.87%
Seats before	43	15	2
Seats won	49	6	5
Seat change	▲6	▼9	▲3
Popular vote	98,021	50,838	26,780
Percentage	55.30%	28.68%	15.11%
Swing	▲5.81	▼9.44	▲6.24
Council control before election
Labour
Council control after election
Labour

The 1994 Hounslow Council election took place on 5 May 1994 to elect members of Hounslow London Borough Council in London, England. The whole council was up for election and the Labour party stayed in overall control of the council.

== Election result ==
1994 Hounslow London Borough Council elections
Party	Seats	Gains	Losses	Net gain/loss	Seats %	Votes %	Votes	+/−
Labour	49	9	3	▲6	81.67	55.30	98,021	▲5.81
Conservative	6	0	9	▼9	10.00	28.68	50,838	▼9.44
Liberal Democrats	5	3	0	▲3	8.33	15.11	26,780	▲6.24
Green	0	0	0	Steady	0.00	0.29	517	▼2.59
Isleworth Comm Group	0	0	0	Steady	0.00	0.26	452	▲0.06
Independent	0	0	0	Steady	0.00	0.14	241	▲0.03
Independent Labour	0	0	0	Steady	0.00	0.12	212	▼0.16
BNP	0	0	0	Steady	0.00	0.10	187	▲0.05
Total	60						177,248	

== Ward results ==
(*) - Indicates an incumbent candidate

(†) - Indicates an incumbent candidate standing in a different ward

=== Brentford Clifden ===
Brentford Clifden (3)
Party	Candidate	Votes	%	±%
Labour	Michael Carman*	1,727	50.51	▲5.34
Labour	Peter Smith	1,660		
Labour	Valerie Lamey	1,645		
Conservative	Margery Buck	833	23.37	▼12.96
Conservative	Spencer Wallis	768		
Conservative	John Hardwick	726		
Liberal Democrats	John Girling	460	13.86	▲9.12
Green	John Bradley	407	12.26	▼1.50
Registered electors		6,292		▼263
Turnout		3,008	47.81	▼3.34
Rejected ballots		7	0.23	▲0.17
Labour hold				
Labour hold				
Labour hold				

=== Chiswick Homefields ===
Chiswick Homefields (2)
Party	Candidate	Votes	%	±%
Labour	Patricia Sterne	909	39.76	▲6.80
Conservative	Norah Atkins*	895	41.34	▼0.23
Conservative	Jillian Potter*	890		
Labour	Juliette Worley	809		
Liberal Democrats	Julie Thomas	442	18.89	▲6.62
Liberal Democrats	Manfred Fox	374		
Registered electors		4,902		▼126
Turnout		2,226	45.41	▼9.08
Rejected ballots		5	0.22	▼0.18
Labour gain from Conservative				
Conservative hold				

=== Chiswick Riverside ===
Chiswick Riverside (3)
Party	Candidate	Votes	%	±%
Conservative	Josephine Langton*	1,498	38.16	▲0.44
Conservative	Paul Lynch*	1,443		
Conservative	Robert Kinghorn*	1,417		
Labour	Kathleen Healy	1,297	31.93	▲3.67
Labour	Tristan Bunnell	1,242		
Liberal Democrats	Andrew Steed	1,148	29.91	▲4.79
Liberal Democrats	Paul Rustad	1,142		
Liberal Democrats	Ian Hunter	1,127		
Labour	Syed Hussain	1,108		
Registered electors		7,279		▲170
Turnout		3,954	54.32	▼6.31
Rejected ballots		6	0.15	▲0.01
Conservative hold				
Conservative hold				
Conservative hold				

=== Cranford ===
Cranford (3)
Party	Candidate	Votes	%	±%
Labour	Sukhbir Dhaliwal	1,932	66.40	▼1.00
Labour	Jagpal Khangura*	1,760		
Labour	Jiwan Virk	1,573		
Conservative	Dalip Dhillon	1,001	33.60	▲1.00
Conservative	Maria Sandford	835		
Conservative	Sted Bukhari	829		
Registered electors		7,130		▼241
Turnout		3,038	42.61	▼0.79
Rejected ballots		32	1.05	▲0.08
Labour hold				
Labour hold				
Labour hold				

=== East Bedfont ===
East Bedfont (3)
Party	Candidate	Votes	%	±%
Labour	Stephen Crawshaw*	1,755	50.98	▲12.13
Labour	Anthony Kreppel	1,627		
Labour	Peter Rowlands	1,611		
Conservative	Patricia Page	952	26.50	▼4.74
Conservative	Alma Jason	845		
Conservative	Keith Witham	799		
Liberal Democrats	Diana Hills	795	22.52	▼1.06
Liberal Democrats	James Daly	726		
Liberal Democrats	Ian Venn	684		
Registered electors		8,933		▲353
Turnout		3,487	39.04	▼7.77
Rejected ballots		6	0.17	▲0.05
Labour hold				
Labour hold				
Labour hold				

=== Feltham Central ===
Feltham Central (3)
Party	Candidate	Votes	%	±%
Labour	David Archer*	1,585	54.93	▲15.90
Labour	Colin Driscoll*	1,569		
Labour	Amelia Brister	1,523		
Conservative	Jack Austin	763	25.55	▼6.63
Conservative	Brian Phelan	713		
Conservative	Mark Nichols	699		
Liberal Democrats	Rachel Beaver	576	19.52	▼9.27
Liberal Democrats	John Howliston	573		
Liberal Democrats	Christopher Hunter	512		
Registered electors		7,565		▼367
Turnout		3,054	40.37	▼5.84
Rejected ballots		3	0.10	▼0.12
Labour hold				
Labour hold				
Labour hold				

=== Feltham North ===
Feltham North (3)
Party	Candidate	Votes	%	±%
Labour	Michael Hunt*	1,925	60.98	▲5.96
Labour	John Chatt*	1,923		
Labour	Stuart Walmsley*	1,876		
Conservative	Allan Wilson	784	24.29	▼10.76
Conservative	David Giles	755		
Conservative	Roy Hine	742		
Liberal Democrats	William Howliston	508	14.73	▲4.80
Liberal Democrats	Anthony West	460		
Liberal Democrats	Sarah Thomas-Bengry	414		
Registered electors		8,231		▼521
Turnout		3,388	41.16	▼3.02
Rejected ballots		9	0.27	▼0.09
Labour hold				
Labour hold				
Labour hold				

=== Feltham South ===
Feltham South (3)
Party	Candidate	Votes	%	±%
Liberal Democrats	Royston Haines* (Note: Haines replaced Cllr Edward Pauling following his death in 1993)	1,284	43.69	New
Labour	Herbert Ham*	1,246	43.99	▼12.27
Liberal Democrats	Christopher Fox	1,163		
Labour	Alfred King*	1.145		
Labour	James Kenna	1,081		
Liberal Democrats	Mohammed Rahman	1,001		
Conservative	John Bolding	371	12.32	▼28.04
Conservative	Denise Harris	312		
Conservative	Jonathan Le Bosquet	289		
Registered electors		6,508		▼110
Turnout		2,814	43.24	▼1.44
Rejected ballots		5	0.18	▼0.09
Liberal Democrats gain from Labour				
Labour hold				
Liberal Democrats hold				

=== Gunnersbury ===
Gunnersbury (3)
Party	Candidate	Votes	%	±%
Labour	Brian Price*	1,864	58.69	▼3.82
Labour	Melvin Collins^{†} (Note: Collins was a sitting councillor representing the Brentford Clifden)	1,851		
Labour	David Hopkins*	1,827		
Conservative	Peter Baldwin	891	27.11	▼10.38
Conservative	Alfred Rowntree	846		
Conservative	David Dine-Hart	821		
Liberal Democrats	Kathleen McGrath	457	14.20	New
Liberal Democrats	Andrew Thompson	437		
Registered electors		7,392		▼410
Turnout		3,297	44.60	▼3.44
Rejected ballots		5	0.15	▼0.78
Labour hold				
Labour hold				
Labour hold				

=== Hanworth ===
Hanworth (3)
Party	Candidate	Votes	%	±%
Liberal Democrats	Raymond Fincher*	1,558	49.28	▲11.98
Liberal Democrats	Michael Hoban	1,464		
Liberal Democrats	Peter Hills	1,390		
Labour	Leslie Bawn*	1,164	36.68	▼1.37
Labour	William Gamble	1,094		
Labour	Helen Kreppel	1,028		
Conservative	Diane Cunningham	337	10.35	▼7.70
Conservative	Timothy Frost	307		
Conservative	Alison Rankin-Frost	284		
Green	Stephen Smith	110	3.69	▼2.91
Registered electors		6,981		▼959
Turnout		3,107	44.51	▼2.34
Rejected ballots		3	0.10	▼0.28
Liberal Democrats gain from Labour				
Liberal Democrats hold				
Liberal Democrats gain from Labour				

=== Heston Central ===
Heston Central (2)
Party	Candidate	Votes	%	±%
Labour	Mohinder Gill	1,513	65.75	▲16.71
Labour	Gopal Dhillon	1,489		
Conservative	Suzanne Lynch	821	33.25	▼8.53
Conservative	Matthew Willsher	743		
Registered electors		4,889		▼22
Turnout		2,394	48.97	▲0.51
Rejected ballots		18	0.75	▲0.46
Labour hold				
Labour hold				

=== Heston East ===
Heston East (2)
Party	Candidate	Votes	%	±%
Labour	Roger Clarke*	1,390	59.32	▲13.68
Labour	Amritpal Mann	1,320		
Conservative	Peter Pitt	782	32.49	▼14.51
Conservative	Rodney Mackenzie-Shannon	701		
BNP	Warren Glass	187	8.19	New
Registered electors		4,702		▼453
Turnout		2,408	51.21	▲2.05
Rejected ballots		17	0.71	▲0.35
Labour gain from Conservative				
Labour hold				

=== Heston West ===
Heston West (3)
Party	Candidate	Votes	%	±%
Labour	Rajinder Bath*	2,346	71.22	▲11.19
Labour	Ronald Bartholomew*	2,319		
Labour	Mohammed Chaudhary*	2,267		
Conservative	Carol Ballard	1,008	28.78	▼6.28
Conservative	Philip Herbert	931		
Conservative	Felicity Bernstein	864		
Registered electors		7,964		▼571
Turnout		3,545	44.51	▼5.74
Rejected ballots		23	0.65	▲0.42
Labour hold				
Labour hold				
Labour hold				

=== Hounslow Central ===
Hounslow Central (3)
Party	Candidate	Votes	%	±%
Labour	Sham Jassar*	1,970	59.15	▲0.06
Labour	Robert Whatley*	1,917		
Labour	Ilyas Khwaja	1,812		
Conservative	Jane Baker	760	21.73	▼6.51
Conservative	Ronald Baker	745		
Conservative	Yadivindra Saroya	589		
Liberal Democrats	Peter Smith	402	12.52	New
Independent Labour	Ikram Sheikh	212	6.60	New
Registered electors		6,967		▼263
Turnout		3,216	46.16	▼1.09
Rejected ballots		19	0.59	▲0.03
Labour hold				
Labour hold				
Labour hold				

=== Hounslow Heath ===
Hounslow Heath (3)
Party	Candidate	Votes	%	±%
Labour	Jagdish Sharma*	2,296	76.67	▲15.46
Labour	Ajmer Dhillon*	2,235		
Labour	David Mockeridge*	2,232		
Conservative	Jacqueline Wright	711	23.33	▼3.06
Conservative	Jasbir Sidhu	676		
Conservative	Martin Redwood	672		
Registered electors		7,938		▼266
Turnout		3,408	42.93	▼4.16
Rejected ballots		21	0.62	▲0.13
Labour hold				
Labour hold				
Labour hold				

=== Hounslow South ===
Hounslow South (3)
Party	Candidate	Votes	%	±%
Labour	Christine Hay	1,974	51.03	▲13.09
Labour	Govind Agarwal	1,765		
Labour	Michael Sterne	1,741		
Conservative	Walter Hill*	1,325	32.71	▼16.32
Conservative	Karl Wolski	1,112		
Conservative	Woljciech Klamut*	1,075		
Liberal Democrats	Diane Payling	622	16.26	New
Liberal Democrats	Rabindra Baneri	541		
Registered electors		7,510		▼511
Turnout		3,696	49.21	▼6.41
Rejected ballots		9	0.24	▲0.11
Labour gain from Conservative				
Labour gain from Conservative				
Labour gain from Conservative				

=== Hounslow West ===
Hounslow West (3)
Party	Candidate	Votes	%	±%
Labour	John Connelly*	2,241	64.45	▲9.89
Labour	Dalbir Cheema	2,172		
Labour	Jagjiwan Singh	2,043		
Conservative	Alicia Bannon	864	23.71	▼9.54
Conservative	Tallat Mirza	758		
Conservative	Hussain Qureshi	753		
Liberal Democrats	Clive Broughton	409	11.83	New
Liberal Democrats	Joan Belcher	394		
Liberal Democrats	Roy Knight	383		
Registered electors		9,224		▲689
Turnout		3,716	40.29	▼9.96
Rejected ballots		14	0.38	▲0.08
Labour hold				
Labour hold				
Labour hold				

=== Isleworth North ===
Isleworth North (3)
Party	Candidate	Votes	%	±%
Labour	Judy Atkinson*	2,162	56.38	▲11.81
Labour	Antony Louki*	2,090		
Labour	Peter Dodkins*	2,055		
Conservative	Gerald McGregor	927	24.20	▼13.47
Conservative	Timothy Mack	914		
Conservative	Premila Bhanderi	865		
Liberal Democrats	Graham Barrow	493	12.96	New
Liberal Democrats	John Read	484		
Liberal Democrats	Joanne Rothwell	473		
Independent	William Chatterton	241	6.46	▲1.58
Registered electors		7,845		▼232
Turnout		3,834	48.87	▼4.17
Rejected ballots		8	0.21	▼0.02
Labour hold				
Labour hold				
Labour hold				

=== Isleworth South ===
Isleworth South (3)
Party	Candidate	Votes	%	±%
Labour	Vanessa Smith*	1,148	41.27	▲5.46
Labour	Patricia Nicholas	1,129		
Labour	Pamela Wharfe*	991		
Liberal Democrats	Ann-Marie Mallon	714	26.53	▲21.06
Liberal Democrats	Gareth Hartwell	695		
Liberal Democrats	Ivan Berti	691		
Isleworth Comm Group	Philip Andrews	452	17.13	▲8.09
Conservative	Sheila Dodd	426	15.08	▼8.10
Conservative	Dorothy Batanero	397		
Conservative	Gregory Pugsley	371		
Registered electors		5,833		▼1,938
Turnout		2,635	45.17	▼2.42
Rejected ballots		7	0.27	▲0.11
Labour hold				
Labour hold				
Labour hold				

=== Spring Grove ===
Spring Grove (3)
Party	Candidate	Votes	%	±%
Conservative	Barbara Reid*	1,685	42.94	▼6.42
Conservative	Peter Carey*	1,671		
Labour	Susan Le Corre	1,561	36.95	▲5.74
Conservative	Robert Stratton*	1,487		
Labour	Shiv Mann	1,387		
Labour	Yashveer Sathi	1,218		
Liberal Democrats	Philip De Boissiere	756	20.11	▲11.48
Registered electors		8,645		▲222
Turnout		3,671	42.46	▼6.81
Rejected ballots		6	0.16	▼0.11
Conservative hold				
Conservative hold				
Labour gain from Conservative				

=== Turnham Green ===
Turnham Green (3)
Party	Candidate	Votes	%	±%
Labour	Paul Bower	1,320	43.81	▲1.65
Labour	Paul Tomlin	1,290		
Labour	Peter Nathan	1,272		
Conservative	Felicity Barwood	1,243	40.18	▲3.85
Conservative	John Sabin	1,188		
Conservative	Wlodzimierz Diemko*	1,129		
Liberal Democrats	Ian Mann	482	16.01	▲6.02
Liberal Democrats	Margaret Ahmed	463		
Registered electors		6,419		▼138
Turnout		2,980	46.42	▼4.29
Rejected ballots		7	0.23	▲0.08
Labour gain from Conservative				
Labour gain from Conservative				
Labour gain from Conservative				
