= 1990 Hounslow London Borough Council election =

1990 local election in England

← 1986	3 May 1990	1994 →

60 seats for election to Hounslow London Borough Council 31 seats needed for a majority
- Registered: 155,314
- Turnout: 75,959, 48.91%
	First party	Second party	Third party
Party	Labour	Conservative	Liberal Democrats
Seats before	40	17	3
Seats won	44 (Note: Includes results from 3 candidates in Feltham South who ran under the Labour Co-op name)	15	1
Seat change	▲4	▼2	▼2
Popular vote	99,384	76,553	17,818
Percentage	49.49%	38.12%	8.87%
Council control before election
Labour
Council control after election
Labour

The 1990 Hounslow Council election took place on 3 May 1990 to elect members of Hounslow London Borough Council in London, England. The whole council was up for election and the Labour party stayed in overall control of the council.

== Election result ==
1990 Hounslow London Borough Council elections
Party	Seats	Gains	Losses	Net gain/loss	Seats %	Votes %	Votes	+/−
Labour	44	4	0	▲4	73.33	49.49	99,384	
Conservative	15	0	2	▼2	25.00	38.12	76,553	
Liberal Democrats	1	0	2	▼2	1.67	8.87	17,818	
Green	0	0	0	Steady	0.00	2.88	5,793	
Independent Labour	0	0	0	Steady	0.00	0.28	562	
Isleworth South Community Group	0	0	0	Steady	0.00	0.20	398	
Independent	0	0	0	Steady	0.00	0.11	220	
BNP	0	0	0	Steady	0.00	0.05	93	
Total	60						200,821	

== Ward results ==
(*) - indicates an incumbent candidate

(†) - indicates an incumbent candidate who has changed wards

=== Brentford Clifden ===
Brentford Clifden (3)
Party	Candidate	Votes	%
Labour	Michael N. Carman	1,603	45.17
Labour	Melvin B. Collins	1,543	
Labour	Patricia A. Nicholas^{†} (Note: Patricia was originally a councillor representing the Isleworth South ward)	1,514	
Conservative	Margery Buck	1,306	36.33
Conservative	John F. Hardwick	1,234	
Conservative	Christopher J.H. Williams	1,208	
Green	John W. Bradley	473	13.76
Liberal Democrats	Steven R. Round	219	4.74
Liberal Democrats	Roy L. Knight	106	
Registered electors		6,555	
Turnout		3,353	51.15
Rejected ballots		2	0.06
Labour hold			
Labour hold			
Labour hold			

=== Chiswick Homefields ===
Chiswick Homefields (2)
Party	Candidate	Votes	%
Conservative	Norah M. Atkins*	1,254	41.57
Conservative	Jillian M. Potter	1,178	
Labour	John H. Grigg	1,049	32.96
Labour	Ilyas Khwaja	878	
Green	Michael S.C. Maxwell	386	13.20
Liberal Democrats	Michael E. Browne	359	12.27
Registered electors		5,028	
Turnout		2,740	54.49
Rejected ballots		11	0.40
Conservative hold			
Conservative hold			

=== Chiswick Riverside ===
Chiswick Riverside (3)
Party	Candidate	Votes	%
Conservative	Josephine C.F. Langton*	1,643	37.72
Conservative	Robert R.F. Kinghorn*	1,636	
Conservative	Paul K.J. Lynch	1,577	
Labour	Valerie J. Lamey	1,311	28.26
Liberal Democrats	Paul R. Rustad	1,191	25.12
Labour	Nigel Rogers	1,173	
Labour	Michael Shrimpton	1,155	
Liberal Democrats	Paula B. Kelly	1,046	
Liberal Democrats	Andrew T. Steed	997	
Green	Hilary T. Maxwell	382	8.90
Registered electors		7,109	
Turnout		4,310	60.63
Rejected ballots		6	0.14
Conservative hold			
Conservative hold			
Conservative hold			

=== Cranford ===
Cranford (3)
Party	Candidate	Votes	%
Labour	Henry A. North	1,951	67.40
Labour	Harbans S. Kanwal*	1,829	
Labour	Jagpal S. Khangura*	1,815	
Conservative	Jack H. Austin	1,013	32.60
Conservative	Walter J. Pestell	865	
Conservative	Gurcharan S. Matharoo	829	
Registered electors		7,371	
Turnout		3,199	43.40
Rejected ballots		31	0.97
Labour hold			
Labour hold			
Labour hold			

=== East Bedfont ===
East Bedfont (3)
Party	Candidate	Votes	%
Labour	Gary W. Cooper	1,584	38.85
Labour	Stephen J. Crawshaw*	1,511	
Labour	Derek W. Bonsor	1,468	
Conservative	Raymond Ferguson	1,292	31.24
Conservative	Patricia E. Page	1,234	
Conservative	Mark T. Simpson	1,142	
Liberal Democrats	James Daly*	978	23.58
Liberal Democrats	Peter R. Hills	952	
Liberal Democrats	Nigel Quin	840	
Green	Mary R. Stacey	248	6.33
Registered electors		8,580	
Turnout		4,016	46.81
Rejected ballots		5	0.12
Labour gain from Liberal Democrats			
Labour hold			
Labour hold			

=== Feltham Central ===
Feltham Central (3)
Party	Candidate	Votes	%
Labour	David Archer*	1,396	39.03
Labour	Colin Driscoll	1,373	
Labour	Stephen M. McEvoy*	1,277	
Conservative	Mark E. Benson	1,156	32.18
Conservative	Daniel R. Lee	1,117	
Liberal Democrats	Robert G. Hill	1,089	28.79
Conservative	Alison H. Parry	1,064	
Liberal Democrats	Alan M. Juriansz	986	
Liberal Democrats	Mohammad A. Rahman	910	
Registered electors		7,932	
Turnout		3,665	46.21
Rejected ballots		8	0.22
Labour hold			
Labour hold			
Labour hold			

=== Feltham North ===
Feltham North (3)
Party	Candidate	Votes	%
Labour	Michael J. Hunt*	2,044	55.02
Labour	John W. Chatt*	2,012	
Labour	Stuart Walmsley	1,944	
Conservative	Deborah E. Beach	1,312	35.05
Conservative	Andrew J. Cleary	1,286	
Conservative	Richard G. Coats	1,223	
Liberal Democrats	Ruth M. Hill	385	9.93
Liberal Democrats	Norman L.A. de Laune	336	
Registered electors		8,752	
Turnout		3,867	44.18
Rejected ballots		14	0.36
Labour hold			
Labour hold			
Labour hold			

=== Feltham South ===
Feltham South (3)
Party	Candidate	Votes	%
Labour Co-op	Herbert R. Ham*	1,623	56.26
Labour Co-op	Alfred G. King*	1,533	
Labour Co-op	Edward J. Pauling*	1,493	
Conservative	Mary T. Lee	1,135	40.36
Conservative	William G. Martin	1,135	
Conservative	Jonathon C. Lebosquet	1,067	
BNP	Michael R. O'Rourke	93	3.38
Registered electors		6,618	
Turnout		2,957	44.68
Rejected ballots		8	0.27
Labour Co-op hold			
Labour Co-op hold			
Labour Co-op hold			

=== Gunnersbury ===
Gunnersbury (3)
Party	Candidate	Votes	%
Labour	Ruth M. Cadbury*	2,230	62.51
Labour	Brian W. Price*	2,104	
Labour	David J. Hopkins	2,081	
Conservative	Raymond A. Langton	1,350	37.49
Conservative	Gregory F. Pugsley	1,258	
Conservative	Michael R. Lingens	1,238	
Registered electors		7,802	
Turnout		3,748	48.04
Rejected ballots		35	0.93
Labour hold			
Labour hold			
Labour hold			

=== Hanworth ===
Hanworth (3)
Party	Candidate	Votes	%
Labour	Leslie Bawn	1,395	38.05
Liberal Democrats	Raymond E. Fincher*	1,389	37.30
Labour	Dave Wetzel^{†} (Note: Dave was originally a councillor representing the East Bedfont ward)	1,354	
Labour	Hilda E. Wetzel	1,348	
Liberal Democrats	Peter S. Cribb*	1,344	
Liberal Democrats	Michael F. Hoban	1,285	
Conservative	Judith S. Russell	720	18.05
Conservative	Ronald C.F. Russell	691	
Conservative	George E. Dryja	533	
Green	Albany M. Back	237	6.60
Registered electors		7,940	
Turnout		3720	46.85
Rejected ballots		14	0.38
Labour hold			
Liberal Democrats hold			
Labour gain from Liberal Democrats			

=== Heston Central ===
Heston Central (2)
Party	Candidate	Votes	%
Labour	James A. Kenna	1,166	49.04
Labour	Govind Agarwal	1,087	
Conservative	Richard R. Foster*	982	41.78
Conservative	Allan Wilson	937	
Liberal Democrats	Ian A. Venn	211	9.18
Registered electors		4,911	
Turnout		2,380	48.46
Rejected ballots		7	0.29
Labour gain from Conservative			
Labour hold			

=== Heston East ===
Heston East (2)
Party	Candidate	Votes	%
Conservative	Bramwell J.E. Ballard*	1,168	47.00
Labour	Roger M. Clarke	1,120	45.64
Conservative	Paul N. Woodward	1,041	
Labour	Ajit S. Mann	1,025	
Liberal Democrats	Christopher F. Fox	183	7.36
Liberal Democrats	Sarah E. Thomas-Bengry	163	
Registered electors		5,155	
Turnout		2,534	49.16
Rejected ballots		9	0.36
Conservative hold			
Labour gain from Conservative			

=== Heston West ===
Heston West (3)
Party	Candidate	Votes	%
Labour	Ronald J. Bartholomew	2,409	60.33
Labour	Rajinder S. Bath	2,328	
Labour	Mohammed H. Chaudhary	2,296	
Conservative	Simon R.P. Foster`	1,444	35.06
Conservative	Adrian J. Wilson	1,354	
Conservative	Caroline A. Imrie	1,288	
Liberal Democrats	Annelise V. Juriansz	229	4.61
Liberal Democrats	Jennifer M. Juriansz	129	
Registered electors		8,535	
Turnout		4,289	50.25
Rejected ballots		10	0.23
Labour hold			
Labour hold			
Labour hold			

=== Hounslow Central ===
Hounslow Central (3)
Party	Candidate	Votes	%
Labour	Geoffrey C. Gill*	2,047	59.09
Labour	Robert J. Wheatley*	1,971	
Labour	Sham S. Jassar*	1,882	
Conservative	Jane M. Baker	1,017	28.24
Conservative	Gerald A.R. McGregor	925	
Conservative	Shirley Wrigley	878	
Green	Ivor D. Trueman	422	12.68
Registered electors		7,230	
Turnout		3,416	47.25
Rejected ballots		19	0.56
Labour hold			
Labour hold			
Labour hold			

=== Hounslow Heath ===
Hounslow Heath (3)
Party	Candidate	Votes	%
Labour	David J. Mockeridge*	2,289	61.21
Labour	Jagdish R. Sharma*	2,237	
Labour	Ajmer S. Dhillon	2,210	
Conservative	Alfred J.M. Rowntree	1,137	26.39
Conservative	Haj M.A. Gondal	893	
Conservative	Chandrapal S. Sethi	875	
Green	Margaret M. Culliton	455	12.40
Registered electors		8,204	
Turnout		3,863	47.09
Rejected ballots		19	0.49
Labour hold			
Labour hold			
Labour hold			

=== Hounslow South ===
Hounslow South (3)
Party	Candidate	Votes	%
Conservative	Valerie D. Marks*	2,215	49.03
Conservative	Peter E. Leggett	2,188	
Conservative	William H. Martin*	2,134	
Labour	Christopher D. Moss	1,783	37.94
Labour	Balbhardar S. Jain	1,639	
Labour	Shiv R.S. Mann	1,635	
Green	Carole Shearman	579	13.03
Registered electors		8,021	
Turnout		4,461	55.62
Rejected ballots		6	0.13
Conservative hold			
Conservative hold			
Conservative hold			

=== Hounslow West ===
Hounslow West (3)
Party	Candidate	Votes	%
Labour	John Connelly*	2,212	54.56
Labour	Arjan S. Dhillon*	2,078	
Labour	Gurcharan K. Mann	1,914	
Conservative	Thomas W. Lewis	1,307	33.25
Conservative	Charles I. Jobling	1,240	
Conservative	Joseph A.J. Roderick	1,232	
Green	Brett Stacey	462	12.19
Registered electors		8,535	
Turnout		4,289	50.25
Rejected ballots		13	0.30
Labour hold			
Labour hold			
Labour hold			

=== Isleworth North ===
Isleworth North (3)
Party	Candidate	Votes	%
Labour	Judy Atkinson	2,131	44.57
Labour	Peter G. Dodkins	1,972	
Labour	Antony Louki	1,927	
Conservative	Diane H. Cunningham	1,754	37.67
Conservative	Kevin J. Edwards	1,672	
Conservative	Christopher J. Gray	1,670	
Green	Lindsay Cooke	581	12.88
Independent	Alan J. Minchan	220	4.88
Registered electors		8,077	
Turnout		4,284	53.04
Rejected ballots		10	0.23
Labour hold			
Labour hold			
Labour hold			

=== Isleworth South ===
Isleworth South (3)
Party	Candidate	Votes	%
Labour	Vanessa K. Smith^{†} (Note: Vanessa was originally a councillor representing the Isleworth North ward)	1,694	35.81
Labour	Peter Caldwell	1,639	
Labour	Pamela Wharfe	1,398	
Conservative	Cole D. Manson	1,075	23.18
Conservative	Peter A. Ross	1,025	
Conservative	Venugopal Nair	963	
Green	Judy S. M. Maciejowska	605	13.74
Independent Labour	William H. Raymond	562	12.76
Isleworth South Community Group	Thomas Reader	398	9.04
Liberal Democrats	Julie V. Thomas	267	5.47
Liberal Democrats	Anthony J. Fenelly	241	
Liberal Democrats	Andrew M.G. Thompson	216	
Registered electors		7,771	
Turnout		3,698	47.59
Rejected ballots		6	0.16
Labour hold			
Labour hold			
Labour hold			

=== Spring Grove ===
Spring Grove (3)
Party	Candidate	Votes	%
Conservative	Barbara A. Reid*	2,113	47.36
Conservative	Peter F. de Vic Carey*	2,043	
Conservative	Robert E. Stratton	1,971	
Labour	Rosemary H. McManus	1,430	31.21
Labour	Barry Wilson	1,345	
Labour	Shivcharn S. Gill	1,262	
Green	Diana Z. Borodzicz	552	12.80
Liberal Democrats	Ivan K.S. Berti	381	8.63
Liberal Democrats	Moira L. Broom	362	
Registered electors		8,423	
Turnout		4,150	49.27
Rejected ballots		11	0.27
Conservative hold			
Conservative hold			
Conservative hold			

=== Turnham Green ===
Turnham Green (3)
Party	Candidate	Votes	%
Conservative	Timothy J.A. Frost	1,475	42.16
Conservative	Alison A. Rankin	1,437	
Conservative	Wlodzimierz Diemko*	1,404	
Labour	John Bentley	1,247	35.80
Labour	Caroline S.M. Gibbon	1,225	
Labour	Susan P. Mockeridge	1,195	
Green	Timothy H. Jorgensen	411	12.04
Liberal Democrats	John D. Parker	364	9.99
Liberal Democrats	Trevor J. Law	346	
Liberal Democrats	Margaret A. Ahmed	314	
Registered electors		6,557	
Turnout		3,325	50.71
Rejected ballots		5	0.15
Conservative hold			
Conservative hold			
Conservative hold			
