= 1998 Hounslow London Borough Council election =

Local election in England

- 7 May 1998

All 60 seats up for election to Hounslow London Borough Council 31 seats needed for a majority
- Registered: 155,583
- Turnout: 50,342. 32.36% (▼12.53)

	First party	Second party
Party	Labour	Conservative
Last election	49 seats, 55.30%	6 seats, 28.68%
Seats before	49 (Note: Labour had 50 councillors after winning a by-election in 1995. Just before the election one of their councillors resigned and left a vacancy)	6
Seats won	44	11
Seat change	▼6	▲5
Popular vote	66,041	37,252
Percentage	50.48%	28.47%
Swing	▼4.82	▼0.21
	Third party	Fourth party
Party	Liberal Democrats	Isleworth Comm Group
Last election	5 seats, 15.11%	0 seats, 0.26%
Seats before	4	0
Seats won	4	1
Seat change	Steady	▲1
Popular vote	19.788	3,726
Percentage	15.13%	2.85%
Swing	▲0.02	▲2.59
Council control before election
Labour
Council control after election
Labour

The 1998 Hounslow Council election took place on 7 May 1998 to elect members of Hounslow London Borough Council in London, England. The whole council was up for election and the Labour Party stayed in overall control of the council.

The election saw Phil Andrews become the first member of Isleworth Community Group elected to the council after defeating a Labour candidate by two votes. However both the Labour and Conservative parties said they would not work with him due to his past membership of the National Front.

At the same as the election Hounslow saw 74.6% vote in favour of the 1998 Greater London Authority referendum and 25.4% against, on a 31.9% turnout.

== Election result ==
Hounslow local election result 1998
Party	Seats	Gains	Losses	Net gain/loss	Seats %	Votes %	Votes	+/−
Labour	44	2	8	▼6	73.33	50.48	66,041	▼4.82
Conservative	11	6	1	▲5	18.33	28.47	37,252	▼0.21
Liberal Democrats	4	1	1	Steady	6.67	15.13	19,788	▲0.02
Isleworth Comm Group	1	1	0	▲1	1.67	2.85	3,726	▲2.59
Ind. Residents	0	0	0	Steady	0.00	2.33	3,048	New
Green	0	0	0	Steady	0.00	0.74	969	▲0.45
Total	60						130,284	

== Ward results ==
=== Brentford Clifden ===
Brentford Clifden (3)
Party	Candidate	Votes	%	±%
Labour	Ruth Cadbury	1,283	52.55	▲2.04
Labour	Michael Carman*	1,190		
Labour	Valerie Lamey*	1,086		
Conservative	Colin Ford	562	23.36	▼0.01
Conservative	Felicity Barwood	525		
Green	John Bradley	506	14.31	▲2.05
Conservative	Spencer Wallis	495		
Green	Peter Hughes	235		
Liberal Democrats	Moira Broom	233	9.78	▼4.08
Green	Stephen Smith	228		
Liberal Democrats	Betty Merson	227		
Liberal Democrats	Zoe Sale	202		
Registered electors		6,456		▲164
Turnout		2,412	37.36	▼10.45
Rejected ballots		15	0.62	▲0.39
Labour hold				
Labour hold				
Labour hold				

=== Chiswick Homefields ===
Chiswick Homefields (2)
Party	Candidate	Votes	%	±%
Conservative	Norah Atkins*	927	44.27	▲2.93
Labour	Patricia Sterne*	869	38.52	▼1.24
Conservative	Alma Jason	853		
Labour	Seema Malhotra	680		
Liberal Democrats	Delphine Hopkins	371	17.21	▼1.68
Liberal Democrats	Julie Thomas	321		
Registered electors		5,435		▲533
Turnout		2,129	39.17	▼6.24
Rejected ballots		19	0.89	▲0.67
Conservative gain from Labour				
Labour gain from Conservative				

=== Chiswick Riverside ===
Chiswick Riverside (3)
Party	Candidate	Votes	%	±%
Conservative	Josephine Langton*	1,219	37.89	▼0.27
Conservative	Paul Lynch*	1,154		
Conservative	Robert Kinghorn*	1,125		
Liberal Democrats	Paul Rustad	1,071	33.16	▲3.25
Liberal Democrats	Andrew Steed	1,055		
Labour	Valerie Yates	955	28.95	▼2.98
Liberal Democrats	Raymond Giles	935		
Labour	Derek Martinus	867		
Labour	John Arnold	851		
Registered electors		7,598		▲319
Turnout		3,270	43.04	▼11.28
Rejected ballots		16	0.49	▲0.34
Conservative hold				
Conservative hold				
Conservative hold				

=== Cranford ===
Cranford (3)
Party	Candidate	Votes	%	±%
Labour	Jagir Dhillon	1,495	74.81	▲8.41
Labour	Sukhbir Dhaliwal*	1,483		
Labour	Harbans Kanwal	1,426		
Conservative	Henry Daniels	604	25.19	▼8.41
Conservative	Syed Bukhari	445		
Conservative	Nusrat Bukhari	434		
Registered electors		7,229		▲99
Turnout		2,266	31.35	▼11.26
Rejected ballots		35	1.54	▲0.49
Labour hold				
Labour hold				
Labour hold				

=== East Bedfont ===
East Bedfont (3)
Party	Candidate	Votes	%	±%
Labour	David Hughes	983	38.80	▼12.18
Labour	Brian Price^{†} (Note: Price was a sitting councillor representing the Gunnersbury ward)	926		
Labour	Devinder Sandhu	862		
Liberal Democrats	Diana Hills	619	24.44	▲1.92
Liberal Democrats	John Howliston	588		
Liberal Democrats	James Daly	538		
Conservative	Norman Ellis	507	19.49	▼7.01
Conservative	Patricia Page	472		
Conservative	Mary Townsend	413		
Ind. Residents	Julius Lobo	411	17.27	New
Registered electors		8,783		▼150
Turnout		2,357	26.84	▼12.20
Rejected ballots		10	0.42	▲0.25
Labour hold				
Labour hold				
Labour hold				

=== Feltham Central ===
Feltham Central (3)
Party	Candidate	Votes	%	±%
Labour	Colin Driscoll*	1,129	47.16	▼7.77
Labour	Colin Ellar	981		
Labour	Kamikar Brar	944		
Conservative	John Bolding	482	20.55	▼5.00
Conservative	Mary Lee	429		
Liberal Democrats	Patricia Murphy	428	16.31	▼3.21
Conservative	Danny Lee	420		
Liberal Democrats	John Quinn	395		
Ind. Residents	David Healey	345	15.98	New
Liberal Democrats	Mohammad Rahman	233		
Registered electors		7,495		▼70
Turnout		2,117	28.25	▼12.12
Rejected ballots		11	0.52	▲0.42
Labour hold				
Labour hold				
Labour hold				

=== Feltham North ===
Feltham North (3)
Party	Candidate	Votes	%	±%
Labour	Michael Hunt*	1,063	46.44	▼14.54
Labour	Stuart Walmsley*	1,060		
Labour	John Chatt*	1,036		
Conservative	Allan Wilson	544	18.70	▼5.59
Ind. Residents	Brian Green	463	20.42	New
Conservative	Gregory Pugsley	412		
Liberal Democrats	William Howliston	401	14.44	▼0.29
Conservative	Hasan Imam	316		
Liberal Democrats	Penning Colin	292		
Liberal Democrats	Anthony West	289		
Registered electors		8,879		▲648
Turnout		2,244	25.27	▼15.89
Rejected ballots		16	0.71	▲0.44
Labour hold				
Labour hold				
Labour hold				

=== Feltham South ===
Feltham South (3)
Party	Candidate	Votes	%	±%
Labour	Herbert Ham*	956	45.58	▲1.59
Labour	Leslie Bawn^{†} (Note: Leslie Bawn was a sitting councillor representing the Hanworth ward. She was elected in a by-election triggered by the resignation of Cllr Michael Hoban in 1995)	843		
Liberal Democrats	John Murphy	711	38.11	▼5.58
Liberal Democrats	Andrew Darley	706		
Labour	Popatlal ariwala	696		
Liberal Democrats	Anne-Marie Mallon	669		
Conservative	Peter Pitt	330	16.31	▲3.99
Conservative	Sandra Cullinane	294		
Conservative	Jonathan Le Bosquet	269		
Registered electors		6,969		▲461
Turnout		2,046	29.36	▼13.88
Rejected ballots		11	0.54	▲0.36
Labour gain from Liberal Democrats				
Labour hold				
Liberal Democrats hold				

=== Gunnersbury ===
Gunnersbury (3)
Party	Candidate	Votes	%	±%
Labour	Melvin Collins*	1,301	59.07	▲0.38
Labour	David Hopkins*	1,257		
Labour	Peter Nathan^{†} (Note: Nathan was a sitting councillor representing the Turnham Green ward)	1,208		
Conservative	Peter Baldwin	617	27.38	▲0.27
Conservative	Raymond Langton	566		
Conservative	Alfred Rowntree	563		
Liberal Democrats	Ian Hunter	315	13.55	▼0.65
Liberal Democrats	Ian Mann	282		
Liberal Democrats	Andrew Thompson	267		
Registered electors		7,600		▲208
Rejected ballots		2,338	30.76	▼13.84
Rejected ballots		15	0.64	▲0.49
Labour hold				
Labour hold				
Labour hold				

=== Hanworth ===
Hanworth (3)
Party	Candidate	Votes	%	±%
Liberal Democrats	Raymond Fincher*	1,098	57.18	▲7.90
Liberal Democrats	Andrew Morgan-Watts	1,049		
Liberal Democrats	Peter Hill*	956		
Labour	Caroline Imrie	641	32.80	▼3.88
Labour	Thomas Sibley	598		
Labour	Peta Vaught	541		
Conservative	Michael Brown	210	10.02	▼0.33
Conservative	Eleanor Hopkins	174		
Conservative	Neil Hopkins	160		
Registered electors		6,942		▼39
Turnout		2,002	28.83	▼15.68
Rejected ballots		9	0.45	▲0.35
Liberal Democrats hold				
Liberal Democrats gain from Labour				
Liberal Democrats hold				

=== Heston Central ===
Heston Central (2)
Party	Candidate	Votes	%	±%
Labour	Mohinder Gill*	916	61.17	▼4.58
Labour	Gopal Dhillon*	891		
Conservative	Maxwell Brown	515	33.68	▲0.43
Conservative	Jack Austin	480		
Ind. Residents	Alan Hindle	76	5.15	New
Registered electors		5,223		▲334
Turnout		1,680	32.17	▼16.80
Rejected ballots		12	0.71	▼0.04
Labour hold				
Labour hold				

=== Heston Central ===
Heston East (2)
Party	Candidate	Votes	%	±%
Labour	Roger Clarke*	1,020	67.12	▲7.80
Labour	Amritpal Mann*	987		
Conservative	John Tosh	495	32.88	▲0.39
Conservative	Atul Pathak	488		
Registered electors		5,193		▲491
Turnout		1,676	32.27	▼18.94
Rejected ballots		16	0.95	▲0.24
Labour hold				
Labour hold				

=== Heston West ===
Heston West (3)
Party	Candidate	Votes	%	±%
Labour	Rajinder Bath*	1,473	58.03	▼13.19
Labour	James Kenna	1,380		
Labour	Mohammed Chaudhary*	1,349		
Conservative	Mary Daniels	609	23.53	▼5.25
Conservative	Betty Haines	564		
Conservative	Philip Herbert	531		
Ind. Residents	Krishan Dutt	445	18.44	New
Registered electors		8,186		▲222
Turnout		2,518	30.76	▼13.75
Rejected ballots		18	0.71	▲0.06
Labour hold				
Labour hold				
Labour hold				

=== Hounslow Central ===
Hounslow Central (3)
Party	Candidate	Votes	%	±%
Labour	Sham Jassar*	1,406	54.35	▼4.80
Labour	Pamela Wharfe^{†} (Note: Wharfe was a sitting councillor representing the Isleworth South ward)	1,329		
Labour	Ilyas Khwaja*	1,327		
Conservative	Julian Muller	482	18.40	▼3.33
Conservative	Prakash Shukla	461		
Conservative	Naseem Yousef	432		
Ind. Residents	Van Johnson	399	16.02	New
Liberal Democrats	Nicholas Harding	311	11.23	▼1.29
Liberal Democrats	Tim Ablitt	283		
Liberal Democrats	Manfred Fox	245		
Registered electors		7,351		▲384
Turnout		2,516	34.23	▼11.93
Rejected ballots		12	0.48	▼0.11
Labour hold				
Labour hold				
Labour hold				

=== Hounslow Heath ===
Hounslow Heath (3)
Party	Candidate	Votes	%	±%
Labour	Jagdish Sharma*	1,481	59.28	▼17.39
Labour	Ajmer Dhillon*	1,382		
Labour	Krishan Chopra	1,303		
Conservative	Alicia Bannon	510	19.42	▼3.91
Ind. Residents	John Beller	499	21.30	New
Conservative	Ronald Carter	468		
Conservative	Rodney Mackenzie-Shannon	387		
Registered electors		8,229		▲291
Turnout		2,477	30.10	▼12.83
Rejected ballots		25	1.01	▲0.39
Labour hold				
Labour hold				
Labour hold				

=== Hounslow South ===
Hounslow South (3)
Party	Candidate	Votes	%	±%
Labour	Christine Hay*	1,489	45.71	▼5.32
Conservative	Jim Hill	1,346	39.19	▲6.48
Labour	Govind Agarwal*	1,245		
Labour	Jagjiwan Singh^{†} (Note: Singh was a sitting councillor representing the Hounslow West ward)	1,206		
Conservative	Roocoomany Deva	1,116		
Conservative	Wojciech Klamut	916		
Liberal Democrats	Peter Smith	504	15.10	▼1.16
Liberal Democrats	Diane Payling	459		
Liberal Democrats	Rabindra Banerji	338		
Registered electors		7,694		▲184
Turnout		3,203	41.63	▼7.58
Rejected ballots		17	0.53	▲0.29
Labour hold				
Conservative gain from Labour				
Labour hold				

=== Hounslow West ===
Hounslow West (3)
Party	Candidate	Votes	%	±%
Labour	John Connelly*	1,479	55.60	▼8.85
Labour	Dalbir Cheema*	1,299		
Labour	Darshan Grewal	1,167		
Conservative	Ravinder Kaushal	693	27.07	▲3.36
Conservative	Thomas Hearn	643		
Conservative	Andrew Varney	585		
Ind. Residents	Manohar Dhiri	410	17.33	New
Registered electors		9,668		▲444
Turnout		2,515	26.01	▼14.28
Rejected ballots		25	0.99	▲0.61
Labour hold				
Labour hold				
Labour hold				

=== Ilseworth North ===
Isleworth North (3)
Party	Candidate	Votes	%	±%
Labour	Ronald Bartholomew^{†} (Note: Bartholomew was a sitting councillor representing the Heston West ward)	1,287	50.22	▼6.16
Labour	Janet Tindall* (Note: Tindall was elected in a by-election triggered by the resignation of Cllr Antony Louki in 1997)	1,225		
Labour	Corinna Smart	1,222		
Conservative	Christopher Gray	641	22.98	▼1.22
Conservative	Gerald McGregor	553		
Conservative	John Sabin	515		
Isleworth Comm Group	Caroline Andrews	420	15.30	New
Isleworth Comm Group	Don Golding	392		
Isleworth Comm Group	Patricia Doran	326		
Liberal Democrats	Joanne Rothwell	290	11.50	▼1.46
Liberal Democrats	David Coppin	286		
Liberal Democrats	Janet Coppin	279		
Registered electors		8,281		▼436
Turnout		2,648	31.98	▼16.89
Rejected ballots		11	0.42	▲0.21
Labour hold				
Labour hold				
Labour hold				

=== Isleworth South ===
Isleworth South (3)
Party	Candidate	Votes	%	±%
Labour	Patricia Nicholas*	896	41.83	▲0.56
Labour	Vanessa Smith*	870		
Isleworth Comm Group	Philip Andrews	763	34.01	New
Labour	Peter Jepson	761		
Isleworth Comm Group	Thomas Reader	674		
Isleworth Comm Group	Patricia Miqdadi	618		
Conservative	Sheila Dodd	288	13.90	▼1.18
Conservative	Linda Morley	284		
Conservative	Alexandra Batanero	268		
Liberal Democrats	Joan Brown	231	10.26	▼16.27
Liberal Democrats	Michael Wilson	211		
Liberal Democrats	Gareth Hartwell	178		
Registered electors		6,920		▲1,087
Turnout		2,202	31.82	▼13.35
Rejected ballots		11	0.50	▲0.23
Labour hold				
Labour hold				
Isleworth Comm Group gain from Labour				

=== Spring Grove ===
Spring Grove (3)
Party	Candidate	Votes	%	±%
Conservative	Barbara Reid*	1,290	42.76	▼0.18
Conservative	Premila Bhanderi	1,277		
Conservative	Peter Carey*	1,262		
Labour	Judith Atkinson^{†} (Note: Atkinson was a sitting councillor representing the Isleworth North ward)	1,261	39.43	▲2.38
Labour	Rooman Butt	1,193		
Labour	Alan Sheerins	1,077		
Liberal Democrats	Ivan Berti	375	11.86	▼8.25
Liberal Democrats	Philip de Boissiere	345		
Liberal Democrats	Joan Belcher	342		
Isleworth Comm Group	Lee Knight	219	5.95	New
Isleworth Comm Group	Stephen Palmer	191		
Isleworth Comm Group	Lancelot Newbigging	123		
Registered electors		8,709		▲64
Turnout		3,168	36.38	▼6.08
Rejected ballots		2	0.06	▼0.10
Conservative hold				
Conservative hold				
Conservative gain from Labour				

=== Turnham Green ===
Turnham Green (3)
Party	Candidate	Votes	%	±%
Conservative	Peter Thompson	1,236	49.07	▲8.89
Conservative	Samantha Davies	1,203		
Conservative	Adrian Lee	1,193		
Labour	Tristan Bunnell	982	39.31	▼4.50
Labour	Michael Sterne^{†} (Note: Sterne was a sitting councillor representing the Hounslow South ward)	966		
Labour	Denys Muench	962		
Liberal Democrats	Margaret Ahmed	318	11.62	▼4.39
Liberal Democrats	Kathleen McGrath	283		
Liberal Democrats	Patricia McGrath	259		
Registered electors		6,743		▲324
Turnout		2,558	37.94	▼8.48
Rejected ballots		21	0.82	▲0.59
Conservative gain from Labour				
Conservative gain from Labour				
Conservative gain from Labour				
