= Brentford (ward) =

- Former electoral ward for the Hounslow London Borough Council
- Brentford ward boundaries
- Borough: Hounslow
- County: Greater London

Former electoral ward
- Created: 2002
- Abolished: 2022
- Number of members: 3
- Replaced by: Brentford East; Brentford West; Chiswick Gunnersbury; Chiswick Riverside
- GSS code: E05000347

Brentford was an electoral ward in the London Borough of Hounslow from 2002 to 2022. The ward was first used in the 2002 elections and last used for the 2018 elections. It returned three councillors to Hounslow London Borough Council.

== Hounslow council elections ==
=== 2018 election ===
The election took place on 3 May 2018.

2018 Hounslow London Borough Council election: Brentford
Party	Candidate	Votes	%	±%
Labour	Melvin Collins	2,319	57.7	+5.2
Labour	Edwin Lambert	2,241	55.7	−3.4
Labour	Corinna Smart	2,118	52.7	+5.1
Conservative	Christian Giovannini	921	22.9	+4.3
Conservative	Alexander Gewanter	857	21.3	+3.1
Green	Victoria George	811	20.2	+2.8
Conservative	Kinsuk Mitra-Thakur	789	19.6	+2.0
Green	Thomas Beaton	573	14.2	N/A
Green	John Firkins	570	14.2	N/A
Independent	Torron-Lee Dewar	250	6.2	N/A
Turnout				
Labour hold		Swing		
Labour hold		Swing		
Labour hold		Swing		

=== 2014 election ===
The election took place on 22 May 2014.

2014 Hounslow London Borough Council election: Brentford
Party	Candidate	Votes	%	±%
Labour	Ruth Cadbury	2,326	59.1	
Labour	Melvin Collins	2,066	52.5	
Labour	Myra Savin	1,875	47.6	
Conservative	Helen Roskott	733	18.6	
Conservative	Gabriella Giles	715	18.2	
Conservative	Julian Tanner	693	17.6	
Green	John Bradley	683	17.4	
UKIP	Ryan Thomas	610	15.5	
Liberal Democrats	Joseph Bourke	311	7.9	
The Community (London Borough of Hounslow)	David Cox	229	5.8	
Liberal Democrats	Sean Bourke	223	5.7	
Liberal Democrats	Mona Naqvi	223	5.7	
All People's Party	Godson Azu	152	3.9	
Turnout		3,936	34.6	
Labour hold		Swing		
Labour hold		Swing		
Labour hold		Swing		
