= Chiswick Homefields =

Electoral ward in London, England

- Electoral ward for the Hounslow London Borough Council
- Borough: Hounslow
- County: Greater London
- Population: 13,740 (2021)
- Electorate: 10,276 (2026)
- Major settlements: Homefields
- Area: 2.723 km²

Current electoral ward
- Created: 1978
- Councillors: Jack Emsley; Michael Denniss; Linden Grigg

Chiswick Homefields is an electoral ward in the London Borough of Hounslow. The ward was first used in the 1978 elections and elects three councillors to Hounslow London Borough Council.

== Geography ==
The ward is named after the Homefields area of Chiswick.

== Councillors ==
The councillor list is sourced from Hounslow Council election results, the Local Elections Archive Project and the Elections Centre.

Election	Councillors		
2026	Jack Emsley (Conservative)	Michael Denniss (Conservative)	Linden Grigg (Conservative)
2022	Jack Emsley (Conservative)	Gerald McGregor (Conservative)	John Todd (Conservative)
2018	John Todd (Conservative)	Gerald McGregor (Conservative)	Patrick Barr (Conservative)
2014	John Todd (Conservative)	Gerald McGregor (Conservative)	Robert Oulds (Conservative)
2010	Gerald McGregor (Conservative)	John Todd (Conservative)	Robert Oulds (Conservative)
2006	Gerald McGregor (Conservative)	John Todd (Conservative)	Robert Oulds (Conservative)
2002	Sally Gilson (Conservative)	Robert Oulds (Conservative)	John Day (Conservative)
1998	N. Atkins (Conservative)	P. Sterne (Labour)	
1994	P. Sterne (Labour)	N. Atkins (Conservative)	
1990	N. Atkins (Conservative)	J. Potter (Conservative)	
1986	N. Atkins (Conservative)	E. Jardan (Conservative)	
1982	T. Crispin (Conservative)	J. Howarth (Conservative)	
1978	T. Crispin (Conservative)	A. Russell (Conservative)	

== Elections ==
=== 2026 Hounslow London Borough Council election ===
Chiswick Homefields (3)
Party	Candidate	Votes	%	±%
Conservative	Jack Emsley	1,911	38.0	−2.6
Conservative	Michael Denniss	1,866	37.1	−6.7
Conservative	Linden Grigg	1,763	35.1	−7.9
Labour	Aisha Farah	1,245	24.8	−4.9
Labour	Mohammed Umair	1,077	21.4	−7.7
Green	Maya Hamlyn	1,064	21.2	+7.2
Labour	Fatima Tayyab	1,029	20.5	−7.7
Liberal Democrats	Helen Cross	930	18.5	+3.9
Green	Claire Li	890	17.7	+6.4
Liberal Democrats	Leigh Edwards	682	13.6	0.0
Liberal Democrats	Arthur Haynes	542	10.8	−4.2
Reform	Mary Brown	541	10.8	New
Reform	David Manson	498	9.9	New
Reform	Nick Roach	469	9.3	New
Turnout		5,027	48.9	+6.2
Conservative hold		Swing		
Conservative hold		Swing		
Conservative hold		Swing		

=== 2022 Hounslow London Borough Council election ===
Chiswick Homefields (3)
Party	Candidate	Votes	%	±%
Conservative	John Richard Todd	1,884	43.8	
Conservative	Gerald Alexander Richard Mcgregor	1,849	43.0	
Conservative	Jack Joseph Emsley	1,746	40.6	
Labour	Olivia Katherine Adesuwa Uwechue	1,277	29.7	
Labour	Saroosh Khan	1,251	29.1	
Labour	Mukesh Malhotra	1,213	28.2	
Liberal Democrats	James Nicholas Charrington	646	15.0	
Liberal Democrats	Mark Cripps	627	14.6	
Green	Martin James Bleach	600	14.0	
Liberal Democrats	Leigh Gareth Edwards	585	13.6	
Green	Astrid Hilne	488	11.3	
Green	Jonathan Stevan Elkon	455	10.6	
Turnout		4,301		
Conservative hold		Swing		
Conservative hold		Swing		
Conservative hold		Swing		
