= Hounslow East (ward) =

Electoral ward in London, England

- Electoral ward for the Hounslow London Borough Council
- Hounslow East ward boundaries
- Borough: Hounslow
- County: Greater London
- Population: 8,672 (2021) (Note: 2021 Census data reported for 2022 ward boundaries)
- Electorate: 6,437 (2026)
- Major settlements: Hounslow
- Area: 0.8772 square kilometres (0.3387 sq mi)

Current electoral ward
- Created: 2022
- Number of members: 2
- Councillors: Paul Baker; Daanish Saeed
- Created from: Hounslow Central
- GSS code: E05013621 (since 2022)

Hounslow East is an electoral ward in the London Borough of Hounslow. The ward was first used in the 2022 elections. It returns two councillors to Hounslow London Borough Council.

== Councillors ==
Election	Councillors	
2026	Paul Baker (Labour)	Daanish Saeed (Labour)
2022	Junue Meah (Labour)	Daanish Saeed (Labour)

== Elections ==
=== 2026 Hounslow London Borough Council election ===
Hounslow East (2)
Party	Candidate	Votes	%	±%
Labour	Paul David Baker	864	34.5	−19.4
Labour	Daanish Saeed	737	29.4	−23.0
Conservative	Nickson Benjamin	673	26.9	−5.6
Green	Katharine Amelia Christabel Kandelaki	583	23.3	+4.4
Conservative	Ragveer Mattu	583	23.3	−8.7
Reform	Sevin Singh Ahuja	555	22.2	New
Reform	Hari Borpatla	539	21.5	New
Liberal Democrats	Suresh Koram	274	10.9	New
Turnout		2,504	38.9	+5.5
Labour hold		Swing		
Labour hold		Swing		

=== 2022 Hounslow London Borough Council election ===
Hounslow East (2)
Party	Candidate	Votes	%	±%
Labour	Junue Meah	1,065	53.9	
Labour	Daanish Saeed	1,035	52.4	
Conservative	Jesal Jignesh Patel	642	32.5	
Conservative	Jignesh Patel	632	32.0	
Green	Mary-Ellen Archer	373	18.9	
Turnout		1,975	33.4	
Labour hold		Swing		
Labour hold		Swing		
