= Hanworth Village =

Electoral ward in the Borough of Hounslow

- Electoral ward for the Hounslow London Borough Council
- Hanworth Village ward boundaries since 2022
- Borough: Hounslow
- County: Greater London
- Population: 16,268 (2021) (Note: 2021 Census data reported for 2022 ward boundaries)
- Electorate: 11,130 (2026)
- Area: 3.961 square kilometres (1.529 sq mi)

Current electoral ward
- Created: 2022
- Number of members: 3
- Councillors: Conrad Brown; Aysha Tariq; Tariq Mehmood
- GSS code: E05013616

Hanworth Village is an electoral ward in the London Borough of Hounslow. The ward was first used in the 2022 elections. It returns three councillors to Hounslow London Borough Council.

== Councillors ==
Election	Councillors		
2026	Conrad Brown (Reform)	Aysha Tariq (Labour)	Tariq Mehmood (Labour)
2022	Richard Foote (Labour)	Allan Joseph (Conservative)	Noreen Kaleem (Labour)

== Hounslow council elections ==
=== 2026 election ===
Richard Foote died in November 2025, with the by-election deferred until May 2026. (Note: Casual vacancies occurring within six months of scheduled elections are not filled.)

2026 Hounslow London Borough Council election: Hanworth Village (3)
Party	Candidate	Votes	%	±%
Reform	Conrad Brown	1,266	30.1	New
Labour	Aysha Tariq	1,229	29.3	−14.6
Labour	Tariq Mehmood	1,204	28.7	−21.2
Reform	Hunter Valentine	1,184	28.2	New
Reform	Sukhjeet Kaur	1,094	26.0	New
Conservative	Allan Joseph	1,050	25.0	−17.7
Labour	Pushpakala Vinoth Kumar	1,014	24.1	−18.2
Conservative	Tony Newman	1,003	23.9	−17.0
Conservative	Katarzyna Zimna	794	18.9	−20.0
Green	Harold Joel Garner	791	18.8	+1.1
Liberal Democrats	Lyndsay St Val	468	11.1	New
Liberal Democrats	Edward Wilson	453	10.8	New
Turnout		4,200	37.8	+7.0
Reform gain from Labour		Swing	21.4	
Labour hold		Swing		
Labour hold		Swing		

=== 2024 by-election ===
The by-election on 4 July 2024 took place on the same day as the United Kingdom general election. It followed the resignation of Noor Kaleem.

2024 Hanworth Village by-election
Party	Candidate	Votes	%	±%
Labour	Aysha Tariq	2,027	39.5	
Conservative	Vanita Kanda	1161	22.6	
Liberal Democrats	William Francis	812	15.8	
Independent	Zubair Awan	549	10.7	
Green	Rashid Wahab	515	10.0	
Turnout		5,135	45.5	
Labour hold		Swing		

=== 2022 election ===
The election took place on 5 May 2022.

2022 Hounslow London Borough Council election: Hanworth Village
Party	Candidate	Votes	%	±%
Labour	Richard Foote	1,675	49.9	
Labour	Noor Kaleem	1,475	43.9	
Conservative	Allan Joseph	1,434	42.7	
Labour	Naeem Ulfat	1,419	42.3	
Conservative	Darius Nasimi	1,373	40.9	
Conservative	Srinivasa Aripirala	1,306	38.9	
Green	Damian Read	595	17.7	
Turnout		3,358	30.8	
Labour win (new seat)				
Labour win (new seat)				
Conservative win (new seat)				
