= Heston Central =

Electoral ward in London, England

- Electoral ward for the Hounslow London Borough Council
- Heston Central ward boundaries since 2022
- Borough: Hounslow
- County: Greater London
- Population: 14,534 (2021) (Note: 2021 Census data reported for 2022 ward boundaries)
- Electorate: 9,693 (2026)
- Major settlements: Heston
- Area: 1.685 square kilometres (0.651 sq mi)

Current electoral ward
- Created: 1978
- Number of members: 1978–2002: 2; 2002–present: 3
- Councillors: Parinoor Kaur; Sampath Mudaliar; Salvador Pereira
- ONS code: 00ATGH (2002–2022)
- GSS code: E05000355 (2002–2022); E05013617 (2022–present)

Heston Central is an electoral ward in the London Borough of Hounslow. The ward was first used in the 1978 elections and elects councillors to Hounslow London Borough Council.

== Councillors ==
Election	Councillors		
2026	Parinoor Kaur (Conservative)	Sampath Mudaliar (Conservative)	Salvador Pereira (Conservative)
2022	Harleen Hear (Labour)	Shivraj Grewal (Labour)	Riaz Gull (Labour)
2018	Harleen Hear (Labour)	Shivraj Grewal (Labour)	Surinder Purewal (Labour)
2014	Harleen Hear (Labour)	Manjit Buttar (Labour)	Surinder Purewal (Labour)
2010	Mohinder Gill (Labour)	Gopal Dhillon (Labour)	Peta Vaught (Labour)
2006	Mohinder Gill (Labour)	Gopal Dhillon (Labour)	Peta Vaught (Labour)
2002	Mohinder Gill (Labour)	Gopal Dhillon (Labour)	Peta Vaught (Labour)
1998	Mohinder Gill (Labour)	Gopal Dhillon (Labour)	
1994	Mohinder Gill (Labour)	Gopal Dhillon (Labour)	
1990	James Kenna (Labour)	Govind Agarwal (Labour)	
1986	Robert Flynn (Labour)	Richard Foster (Conservative)	
1982	Maurice Venn (Conservative)	Richard Foster (Conservative)	
1978	Maurice Venn (Conservative)	Richard Foster (Conservative)	

== Hounslow council elections since 2022 ==
There was a revision of ward boundaries in Hounslow in 2022.

=== 2026 election ===
Riaz Gull resigned in November 2025, with the by-election deferred until May 2026. (Note: Casual vacancies occurring within six months of scheduled elections are not filled.) The election took place on 7 May 2026.

2026 Hounslow London Borough Council election: Heston Central (3)
Party	Candidate	Votes	%	±%
Conservative	Parinoor Kaur	1,470	40.1	+15.8
Conservative	Salvador Antonio Jose Pereira	1,246	34.0	+17.6
Conservative	Sampath Mudaliar	1,167	31.8	+18.3
Labour	Janet Elaine Grewal	1,146	31.2	−34.6
Labour	Shivraj Singh Grewal	1,111	30.3	−29.4
Labour	Mohammad Rasheed Bhatti	999	27.2	−28.2
Green	Daniel Gask	821	22.4	+6.6
Reform	Aaron Panesar	571	15.6	New
Reform	Yash Sharma	514	14.0	New
Reform	Zak Lazarov Tsolov	425	11.6	New
Liberal Democrats	Nooralhaq Nasimi	353	9.6	−5.5
Turnout		3,670	37.9	+6.6
Conservative gain from Labour		Swing	24.6	
Conservative gain from Labour		Swing	18.9	
Conservative gain from Labour		Swing	13.4	

=== 2022 election ===
The election took place on 5 May 2022.

2022 Hounslow London Borough Council election: Heston Central (3)
Party	Candidate	Votes	%	±%
Labour	Shivraj Grewal	1,957	65.8	
Labour	Harleen Hear	1,775	59.7	
Labour	Riaz Gull	1,648	55.4	
Conservative	Sandra Cullinane	724	24.3	
Conservative	Nooralhaq Nasimi	489	16.4	
Green	Tony Browne	471	15.8	
Liberal Democrats	Chaitan Shah	450	15.1	
Conservative	Mohammed Shaikh	403	13.5	
Turnout		2,975	31.3	
Labour win (new boundaries)				
Labour win (new boundaries)				
Labour win (new boundaries)				

== 2002–2022 Hounslow council elections ==
Heston Central ward boundaries from 2002 to 2022

There was a revision of ward boundaries in Hounslow in 2002. The number of councillors returned from Heston Central was increased from two to three.

=== 2018 election ===
The election took place on 3 May 2018.

2018 Hounslow London Borough Council election: Heston Central (3)
Party	Candidate	Votes	%	±%
Labour	Harleen Hear	2,044	66.5	
Labour	Surinder Purewal	1,889	61.5	
Labour	Shivraj Grewal	1,873	61.0	
Conservative	Ian May	681	22.2	
Conservative	Harpreet Boparai	671	21.8	
Conservative	Muraad Chaudhry	647	21.1	
Green	Heather Broadbridge	209	6.8	
Liberal Democrats	Duncan Buchanan	187	6.1	
Green	Sergejs Adamovs	182	5.9	
Liberal Democrats	Parmail Kaur	147	4.8	
Green	Benjamin Ginsborg	146	4.8	
Turnout				
Labour hold		Swing		
Labour hold		Swing		
Labour hold		Swing		

=== 2014 election ===
The election took place on 22 May 2014.

2014 Hounslow London Borough Council election: Heston Central (3)
Party	Candidate	Votes	%	±%
Labour	Harleen Hear	2,095		
Labour	Manjit Buttar	2,041		
Labour	Surinder Purewal	1,951		
Conservative	Amarjit Dhillon	1,018		
Conservative	Karamat Malik	968		
Conservative	Radhesham Karwal	836		
UKIP	Clive Barnes	420		
Turnout				
Labour hold		Swing		
Labour hold		Swing		
Labour hold		Swing		

=== 2010 election ===
The election on 6 May 2010 took place on the same day as the United Kingdom general election.

2010 Hounslow London Borough Council election: Heston Central (3)
Party	Candidate	Votes	%	±%
Labour	Mohinder Gill	2,739		
Labour	Gopal Dhillon	2,692		
Labour	Peta Vaught	2,383		
Conservative	Amarjit Dhillon	1,998		
Conservative	Karamat Malik	1,798		
Conservative	Bhupindar Lakhanpaul	1,793		
Independent	Vedvardhan Tripathi	529		
Turnout				
Labour hold		Swing		
Labour hold		Swing		
Labour hold		Swing		

=== 2006 election ===
The election took place on 4 May 2006.

2006 Hounslow London Borough Council election: Heston Central (3)
Party	Candidate	Votes	%	±%
Labour	Gopal Dhillon	1,133		
Labour	Mohinder Gill	1,129		
Labour	Peta Vaught	972		
Conservative	Arti Jangra	832		
Conservative	Naman Purewal	801		
Conservative	Nathalal Taank	781		
Hounslow Independent Alliance	Sheila Brown	739		
Hounslow Independent Alliance	Karamat Malik	717		
Hounslow Independent Alliance	Jagjit Sidhu	573		
Liberal Democrats	Narinderjit Patel	337		
Turnout				
Labour hold		Swing		
Labour hold		Swing		
Labour hold		Swing		

=== 2002 election ===
The election took place on 2 May 2002.

2002 Hounslow London Borough Council election: Heston Central (3)
Party	Candidate	Votes	%	±%
Labour	Gopal Dhillon	1,291		
Labour	Mohinder Gill	1,267		
Labour	Peta Vaught	1,261		
Conservative	Bhupindar Lakhanpaul	814		
Conservative	Naman Purewal	813		
Conservative	Nathalal Taank	740		
Green	Alison Edwards	354		
Turnout				
Labour win (new boundaries)				
Labour win (new boundaries)				
Labour win (new boundaries)				

== 1978–2002 Hounslow council elections ==
Heston Central ward boundaries from 1978 to 2002

=== 1998 election ===
The election on 7 May 1998 took place on the same day as the 1998 Greater London Authority referendum.

1998 Hounslow London Borough Council election: Heston Central (2)
Party	Candidate	Votes	%	±%
Labour	Mohinder Gill	916		
Labour	Gopal Dhillon	891		
Conservative	Maxwell Brown	515		
Conservative	Jack Austin	480		
Ind. Residents	Alan Hindle	76		
Turnout				
Labour hold		Swing		
Labour hold		Swing		

=== 1994 election ===
The election took place on 5 May 1994.

1994 Hounslow London Borough Council election: Heston Central (2)
Party	Candidate	Votes	%	±%
Labour	Mohinder Gill	1,513		
Labour	Gopal Dhillon	1,489		
Conservative	Suzanne Lynch	821		
Conservative	Matthew Willsher	743		
Turnout				
Labour hold		Swing		
Labour hold		Swing		

=== 1990 election ===
The election took place on 3 May 1990.

1990 Hounslow London Borough Council election: Heston Central (2)
Party	Candidate	Votes	%	±%
Labour	James Kenna	1,116		
Labour	Govind Agarwal	1,087		
Conservative	Richard Foster	982		
Conservative	Allan Wilson	937		
Liberal Democrats	Ian Venn	211		
Turnout				
Labour gain from Conservative		Swing		
Labour hold		Swing		

=== 1986 election ===
The election took place on 8 May 1986.

1986 Hounslow London Borough Council election: Heston Central (2)
Party	Candidate	Votes	%	±%
Conservative	Richard Foster	947		
Labour	Robert Flynn	904		
Labour	James Kenna	899		
Conservative	Allan Wilson	852		
Alliance (SDP)	Benjamin Levy	203		
Alliance (Liberal)	Anna Juriansz	201		
Turnout				
Conservative hold		Swing		
Labour gain from Conservative		Swing		

=== 1982 election ===
The election took place on 6 May 1982.

1982 Hounslow London Borough Council election: Heston Central (2)
Party	Candidate	Votes	%	±%
Conservative	Maurice Venn	1,030		
Conservative	Richard Foster	1,019		
Labour	Bernard Murphy	645		
Labour	John Chatt	617		
Alliance (Liberal)	Roger Thompson	408		
Alliance (SDP)	Richard Dorman	392		
Turnout				
Conservative hold		Swing		
Conservative hold		Swing		

=== 1978 election ===
The election took place on 4 May 1978.

1978 Hounslow London Borough Council election: Heston Central (2)
Party	Candidate	Votes	%	±%
Conservative	Maurice Venn	1,285		
Conservative	Richard Foster	1,264		
Labour	Alan Gillespie	738		
Labour	Aaron Haney	699		
Turnout				
Conservative win (new seat)				
Conservative win (new seat)				
