= 2026 Hounslow London Borough Council election =

2026 local election in Hounslow

- 7 May 2026

All 62 seats to Hounslow London Borough Council 32 seats needed for a majority
	First party	Second party	Third party
Leader	Shantanu Rajawat	Jack Emsley	Tony Brown
Party	Labour	Conservative	Reform
Last election	52 seats, 53.8%	10 seats, 30.8%	N/A
Seats before	43 (Note: Includes the vacant seat in Hanworth Village last held by Labour.)	10	1
Seats won	32	17	8
Seat change	▼20	▲7	▲8
Popular vote	71,613	58,752	40,085
Percentage	32.6%	26.8%	18.3%
Swing	▼21.2pp	▼4.0pp	▲18.3pp
	Fourth party	Fifth party	Sixth party
Leader	Guy Lambert	Roger Crouch	Theo Dennison
Party	Green	Liberal Democrats	Independent
Last election	0 seats, 7.2%	0 seats, 6.4%	0 seats, 0.9%
Seats before	1	0	7 (Note: Includes the vacant seat of Heston Central last held by an independent.)
Seats won	3	1	1
Seat change	▲3	▲1	▲1
Popular vote	22,023	20,230	6,638
Percentage	9.8%	9.4%	3.2%
Swing	▲2.5pp	▲3.0 pp	▲2.3pp
- Map of the results of the 2026 Hounslow council election.
Leader before election
Shantanu Rajawat
Labour Co-op
Leader after election
Shantanu Rajawat
Labour Co-op

The 2026 Hounslow London Borough Council election took place on 7 May 2026 for all 62 members of Hounslow London Borough Council. The elections took place alongside local elections in the other London boroughs and elections to local authorities across the United Kingdom.

Prior to the election, the council was under Labour majority control. Labour retained their majority, but lost seats to both the Conservatives and Reform UK, reducing Labour's majority to just one seat.

== Background ==
In March 2025, former Labour councillor Theo Dennison won a by-election as an independent.

== Previous council composition ==
After 2022 election		Before 2026 election		After 2026 election	
Party	Seats	Party	Seats	Party	Seats
Labour	52	Labour	40	Labour	32
Conservative	10	Conservative	10	Conservative	17
Green	0	Independent	6	Reform	8
Reform	0	Green	1	Green	3
Liberal Democrats	0	Reform	1	Liberal Democrats	1
Independent	0	Vacant	3	Independent	1
Vacant	N/A				

Changes 2022–2026:

- January 2023: Adriana Gheorghe (Labour) resigns – by-election held March 2023
- March 2023: Emma Siddhu (Labour) wins by-election
- October 2023: Lara Parizotto (Labour) leaves party to sit as an independent
- March 2024:
  - Lara Parizotto (Independent) resigns – by-election held May 2024
  - Amritpal Mann (Labour) joins Workers Party
- May 2024:
  - Emma Yates (Labour) wins by-election
  - Noor Kaleem (Labour) resigns – by-election held July 2024
  - Kuldeep Tak (Conservative) joins Labour
- July 2024: Aysha Tariq (Labour) wins by-election
- November 2024: Guy Lambert (Labour) suspended from party
- January 2025: Balraj Sarai (Labour) and Rhys Williams (Labour) resign – by-elections held March 2025
- March 2025: Max Mosley (Labour) holds by-election and Theo Dennison (Independent) gains by-election from Labour
- June 2025: Sukhbir Singh Dhaliwal (Labour) dies – by-elections held August 2025
- August 2025: Hira Singh Dhillon (Labour) wins by-election
- November 2025:
  - Richard Foote (Labour) dies – seat left vacant until 2026 election
  - Riaz Gull, Harleen Atwal Hear, Afzaal Kiani, and Raghwinder Siddhu (Labour) leave party to sit as independents
  - Amritpal Mann (Workers Party) leaves party to sit as an independent
  - Vickram Singh Grewal (Labour) joins Conservatives
  - Guy Lambert (Independent) joins Greens
- December 2025:
  - Hina Mir (Labour) suspended from party
  - Karamat Malik (Labour) joins Conservatives
- January 2026: Riaz Gull (Independent) resigns – seat left vacant until 2026 election
- March 2026:
  - Junue Meah (Labour) dies – seat left vacant until 2026 election
  - Jagdish Shama (Labour) dies – seat left vacant until 2026 election
- April 2026: Bandna Chopra (Labour) joins Reform

== Results summary ==
Council composition after the 2022 election

Council composition after the 2026 election

2026 Hounslow London Borough Council election
Party	Candidates	Seats	Gains	Losses	Net gain/loss	Seats %	Votes %	Votes	+/−
Labour	62	32	0	20	▼20	51.6	32.6	71,613	-21.2
Conservative	61	17	10	3	▲7	27.4	26.8	58,752	-4.0
Reform	61	8	8	0	▲8	12.9	18.3	40,085	New
Green	26	3	3	0	▲3	4.8	9.8	22,023	+2.5
Liberal Democrats	38	1	1	0	▲1	1.6	9.4	20,230	+3.0
Brentford, Isleworth, Heston & Hounslow Independents	10	1	1	0	▲1	1.6	2.5	5,385	New
Independent	5	0	0	0	Steady	0.0	0.6	1,253	-0.3
TUSC	2	0	0	0	0	0.0	0.1	221	New

== Ward results ==
Candidates marked with * were sitting councillors for the ward they contested.

=== Bedfont ===
Bedfont (3)
Party	Candidate	Votes	%	±%
Reform	Russell Haynes	1,393	33.2	New
Reform	Gerry Lieberman	1,307	31.2	New
Labour	Adesh Farmahan*	1,253	29.9	−21.9
Reform	Jagdeep Jassal	1,240	29.6	New
Labour	Komalpreet Sachdeva	1,152	27.5	−24.3
Labour	Harjinder Sohi	1,101	26.3	−17.6
Conservative	Haresh Bhalsod	985	23.5	−15.3
Conservative	Buddhiman Darnal	974	23.2	−13.5
Conservative	Karna Gurung	944	22.5	−8.6
Green	Kalid Mohamud	739	17.6	+4.3
Liberal Democrats	Donal Quinn	444	10.6	New
Turnout		4,190	40.2	+8.4
Reform gain from Labour		Swing	19.1	
Reform gain from Labour		Swing	17.4	
Labour hold		Swing		

=== Brentford East ===
Brentford East (2)
Party	Candidate	Votes	%	±%
Labour	Marcela Benedetti	812	42.9	−23.8
Labour	Max Mosley*	740	39.1	−23.6
Green	Tony Firkins	514	27.1	+7.4
Reform	Martin Pennell	398	21.0	New
Reform	Irena Tumilowicz	342	18.1	New
Liberal Democrats	Bernice Roust	272	14.4	New
Conservative	Paul Baksh	233	12.3	−4.8
Conservative	Zoe Ward	192	10.1	−9.8
Turnout		1,894		
Labour hold		Swing		
Labour hold		Swing		

=== Brentford West ===
Brentford West (2)
Party	Candidate	Votes	%	±%
Green	Guy Lambert*	1,078	40.0	+10.7
Labour	Craig Owen	836	31.0	−20.8
Green	Rashid Wahab	670	24.8	+8.7
Labour	Husna Hashmi	640	23.7	−25.3
Reform	Bob Ayres	374	13.9	New
Liberal Democrats	Joe Bourke	315	11.7	New
Reform	Gordon Turner	311	11.5	New
Conservative	Jeremy Larsson	265	9.8	−8.1
Brentford Independent	Scott Illman	252	9.3	New
Liberal Democrats	Gary Padbury	249	9.2	New
Conservative	Radhesham Chauhan	226	8.4	−8.8
Turnout		2,698	45.5	+9.4
Green gain from Labour		Swing	15.8	
Labour hold		Swing		

=== Chiswick Gunnersbury ===
Chiswick Gunnersbury (3)
Party	Candidate	Votes	%	±%
Conservative	Joanna Biddolph*	1,709	40.7	−1.9
Conservative	Ron Mushiso*	1,493	35.5	−3.0
Conservative	Vickram Grewal	1,382	32.9	−5.0
Labour	Maria Saroya	1,088	25.9	−11.4
Labour	Hanif Khan	1,017	24.2	−9.0
Green	Aubrey Crawley	999	23.8	New
Green	Jon Elkon	949	22.6	New
Labour	Naeem Ulfat	776	18.5	−14.8
Liberal Democrats	Guy De Boursac	559	13.3	−9.7
Liberal Democrats	Paul Halliwell	524	12.5	−9.5
Liberal Democrats	Nik Hole	471	11.2	−6.8
Reform	Joshua Stanton	337	8.0	New
Reform	Leanne Yu	324	7.7	New
Reform	Sau Parkins	322	7.7	New
Turnout		4,200	46.0	+5.2
Conservative hold		Swing		
Conservative hold		Swing		
Conservative hold		Swing		

=== Chiswick Homefields ===
Chiswick Homefields (3)
Party	Candidate	Votes	%	±%
Conservative	Jack Emsley*	1,911	38.0	−2.6
Conservative	Michael Denniss	1,866	37.1	−6.7
Conservative	Linden Grigg	1,763	35.1	−7.9
Labour	Aisha Farah	1,245	24.8	−4.9
Labour	Mohammed Umair	1,077	21.4	−7.7
Green	Maya Hamlyn	1,064	21.2	+7.2
Labour	Fatima Tayyab	1,029	20.5	−7.7
Liberal Democrats	Helen Cross	930	18.5	+3.9
Green	Claire Li	890	17.7	+6.4
Liberal Democrats	Leigh Edwards	682	13.6	0.0
Liberal Democrats	Arthur Haynes	542	10.8	−4.2
Reform	Mary Brown	541	10.8	New
Reform	David Manson	498	9.9	New
Reform	Nick Roach	469	9.3	New
Turnout		5,027	48.9	+6.2
Conservative hold		Swing		
Conservative hold		Swing		
Conservative hold		Swing		

=== Chiswick Riverside ===
Chiswick Riverside (3)
Party	Candidate	Votes	%	±%
Labour	Amy Croft*	1,387	36.4	−0.1
Conservative	Gabriella Giles*	1,202	31.5	−6.4
Green	Rick Rowe	1,184	31.1	+13.5
Conservative	Peter Thompson*	1,146	30.1	−7.2
Conservative	Jessika Toto-Moukouo	949	24.9	−11.3
Green	Muddassir Syed	896	23.5	+7.9
Labour	Trevor MacFarlane	865	22.7	−9.1
Labour	Gurminder Randhawa	820	21.5	−10.3
Liberal Democrats	Frank Beddington	627	16.4	−0.2
Liberal Democrats	Nicholas Bellerophon	472	12.4	−3.3
Liberal Democrats	James Charrington	362	9.5	−6.2
Reform	James Kerr	327	8.6	New
Reform	Royen Fernandes	295	7.7	New
Reform	George Radulski	283	7.4	New
Turnout		3,812	49.2	+8.6
Labour hold		Swing		
Conservative hold		Swing		
Green gain from Conservative		Swing	6.8	

=== Cranford ===
Cranford (3)
Party	Candidate	Votes	%	±%
Conservative	Vilber Decosta	1,541	38.4	+16.8
Conservative	Gurpreet Sidhu	1,439	35.8	+14.2
Labour	Hira Dhillon*	1,387	34.6	−25.6
Conservative	Prachi Vadsola	1,200	29.9	+8.3
Labour	Marina Sharma	1,170	29.1	−30.9
Labour	Sayyar Raza	1,128	28.1	−31.9
Green	Gill Chapman	818	20.4	+12.8
Reform	Rebecca Howard	667	16.6	New
Reform	Raj Kumari	496	12.4	New
Reform	Yash Sunda	451	11.2	New
Liberal Democrats	Renu Raj	422	10.5	New
Turnout		4,014	36.7	+6.2
Conservative gain from Labour		Swing	8.4	
Conservative gain from Labour		Swing	7.1	
Labour hold		Swing		

=== Feltham North ===
Feltham North (3)
Party	Candidate	Votes	%	±%
Labour	Muhammad Akram*	1,171	30.6	−14.0
Reform	David Kerr	1,122	29.4	New
Reform	Adam Parkins	1,094	28.6	New
Labour	Emma Yates	1,090	28.5	−17.7
Labour	Kuldeep Tak*	1,016	26.6	−15.9
Reform	Khushwant Singh	993	26.0	New
Conservative	Indra Lingden	901	23.6	−22.2
Conservative	Chaitanya Sinha	800	20.9	−23.0
Conservative	Wafa Khider	783	20.5	−21.5
Green	Sergejs Adamovs	646	16.9	+1.4
Hounslow Independent	Dan Barnett	437	11.4	New
Liberal Democrats	Arlene Juriansz	331	8.7	New
Independent	Krissh Thangavelu	172	4.5	New
Turnout		3,822	42.7	+9.1
Labour hold		Swing		
Reform gain from Labour		Swing	23.1	
Reform gain from Labour		Swing	21.3	

=== Feltham West ===
Feltham West (3)
Party	Candidate	Votes	%	±%
Labour	Madeeha Asim*	1,345	30.5	−21.5
Reform	Tony Brown	1,339	30.3	New
Labour	Alan Mitchell*	1,335	30.3	−27.8
Labour	Malwina Kukaj	1,211	27.4	−24.3
Reform	Christopher Wrightson	1,204	27.3	New
Reform	Chinmay Parulekar	1,106	25.1	New
Conservative	Steve Redknap	863	19.6	−13.6
Conservative	Rashi Chabra	812	18.4	−14.7
Conservative	Manoj Srirangam	803	18.2	−14.0
Green	Ross Baillie	739	16.7	+0.1
Hounslow Independent	Nii Anum	466	10.6	New
Hounslow Independent	Alex Campbell	437	9.9	New
Liberal Democrats	Riza Polat	341	7.7	New
Independent	Muhammad Lebbe	168	3.8	New
Turnout		4,412	40.5	+12.2
Labour hold		Swing		
Reform gain from Labour		Swing	15.2	
Labour hold		Swing		

=== Hanworth Park ===
Hanworth Park (2)
Party	Candidate	Votes	%	±%
Reform	Johan Lindsten	988	32.1	New
Reform	Adrian Page	968	31.5	New
Labour	Samantha Christie	881	28.7	−19.5
Labour	Farah Kamran*	852	27.7	−18.0
Conservative	Joseph Lobo	672	21.9	−13.9
Conservative	Carl Vaz	588	19.1	−11.1
Green	David Bates	541	17.6	+2.8
Liberal Democrats	Simon Martin	349	11.3	−1.8
Turnout		3,075	41.4	+10.6
Reform gain from Labour		Swing	24.8	
Reform gain from Labour		Swing	23.6	

=== Hanworth Village ===
Hanworth Village (3)
Party	Candidate	Votes	%	±%
Reform	Conrad Brown	1,266	30.1	New
Labour	Aysha Tariq*	1,229	29.3	−13.0
Labour	Tariq Mehmood	1,204	28.7	−13.6
Reform	Hunter Valentine	1,184	28.2	New
Reform	Sukhjeet Kaur	1,094	26.0	New
Conservative	Allan Joseph*	1,050	25.0	−17.7
Labour	Pushpakala Vinoth Kumar	1,014	24.1	−18.2
Conservative	Tony Newman	1,003	23.9	−17.0
Conservative	Katarzyna Zimna	794	18.9	−20.0
Green	Harold Garner	791	18.8	+1.1
Liberal Democrats	Lyndsay St Val	468	11.1	New
Liberal Democrats	Edward Wilson	453	10.8	New
Turnout		4,200	37.8	+7.0
Reform gain from Conservative		Swing	21.4	
Labour hold		Swing		
Labour hold		Swing		

=== Heston Central ===
Heston Central (3)
Party	Candidate	Votes	%	±%
Conservative	Parinoor Kaur	1,470	40.1	+15.8
Conservative	Salvador Pereira	1,246	34.0	+18.9
Conservative	Sampath Mudaliar	1,167	31.8	+18.3
Labour	Janet Grewal	1,146	31.2	−24.2
Labour	Shivraj Grewal*	1,111	30.3	−35.5
Labour	Mohammad Bhatti	999	27.2	−32.5
Green	Daniel Gask	821	22.4	+6.6
Reform	Aaron Panesar	571	15.6	New
Reform	Yash Sharma	514	14.0	New
Reform	Zak Tsolov	425	11.6	New
Liberal Democrats	Nooralhaq Nasimi	353	9.6	−6.8
Turnout		3,670	37.9	+4.4
Conservative gain from Labour		Swing	24.6	
Conservative gain from Labour		Swing	18.9	
Conservative gain from Labour		Swing	13.4	

=== Heston East ===
Heston East (3)
Party	Candidate	Votes	%	±%
Green	Jasmine Deol	1,065	35.0	+21.0
Labour	Fiza Ahmed	977	32.1	−20.9
Labour	Gurbachan Athwal	977	32.1	−26.2
Labour	Gurmail Lal*	952	31.3	−30.1
Conservative	Nataliya Smith	719	23.6	−6.1
Conservative	Rugved Kirtikar	648	21.3	−5.4
Conservative	Ghassan Ahmadieh	627	20.6	−6.1
Reform	Pritpal Mann	619	20.3	New
Reform	Bandna Chopra	613	20.1	New
Reform	Atamdeep Khosa	540	17.7	New
Liberal Democrats	Josefina Nvono-Ecoro	350	11.5	New
Turnout		3,046	37.5	+4.3
Green gain from Labour		Swing	29.7	
Labour hold		Swing		
Labour hold		Swing		

=== Heston West ===
Heston West (3)
Party	Candidate	Votes	%	±%
Labour	Lily Bath	1,307	36.1	−33.1
Conservative	Satwant Kaur	1,269	35.1	+13.0
Labour	Shantanu Rajawat*	1,105	30.5	−35.5
Labour	Edward Wall	1,018	28.1	−33.2
Conservative	Anthony Mascarenhas	925	25.6	+6.4
Conservative	Viralkumar Shah	835	23.1	+4.0
Green	Luke Lee	712	19.7	+3.2
Heston Independent	Indrabir Gill	653	18.1	New
Reform	Chris Beauchamp	457	12.6	New
Heston Independent	Tamoor Khan	407	11.3	New
Heston Independent	Chaitan Shah	400	11.1	New
Reform	Rajesh Tewari	393	10.9	New
Liberal Democrats	Darius Nasimi	275	7.6	New
Turnout		3,617	36.0	+7.6
Labour hold		Swing		
Conservative gain from Labour		Swing	24.2	
Labour hold		Swing		

=== Hounslow Central ===
Hounslow Central (3)
Party	Candidate	Votes	%	±%
Labour	Pamila Rodrigues	1,192	39.6	−16.5
Labour	Ajmer Grewal*	1,104	36.7	−20.5
Labour	Pritam Grewal*	1,093	36.3	−23.4
Conservative	Malcolm Silveira	1,066	35.4	+5.1
Conservative	Theo Abraham	1,043	34.7	+6.6
Conservative	Rakesh Raut	960	31.9	+5.3
Green	Yousaf Chand	584	19.4	+0.6
Reform	Theodore Charles	384	12.8	New
Liberal Democrats	Mohan Bains	356	11.8	New
Reform	Kathy Soulsbury	330	11.0	New
Reform	Neil Parkhouse	323	10.7	New
Turnout		3,008	39.7	+8.7
Labour hold		Swing		
Labour hold		Swing		
Labour hold		Swing		

=== Hounslow East ===
Hounslow East (2)
Party	Candidate	Votes	%	±%
Labour	Paul Baker	864	34.5	−19.4
Labour	Daanish Saeed*	737	29.4	−23.0
Conservative	Nickson Benjamin	673	26.9	−5.6
Conservative	Ragveer Mattu	583	23.3	−8.7
Green	Katharine Kandelaki	583	23.3	+4.4
Reform	Sevin Ahuja	555	22.2	New
Reform	Hari Borpatla	539	21.5	New
Liberal Democrats	Suresh Koram	274	10.9	New
Turnout		2,504	38.9	+5.5
Labour hold		Swing		
Labour hold		Swing		

=== Hounslow Heath ===
Hounslow Heath (3)
Party	Candidate	Votes	%	±%
Labour	Samia Chaudhary*	1,830	42.3	−16.3
Labour	Sahibaa Hussain	1,446	33.5	−18.6
Conservative	Darshan Nagi	1,358	31.4	+3.7
Labour	Farhaan Rehman*	1,304	30.2	−19.4
Conservative	Umar Farooq	1,177	27.2	+7.2
Green	Stefan Wells	1,147	26.5	+11.0
Reform	Monica Clare	883	20.4	New
Liberal Democrats	Warwick Francis	722	16.7	+2.1
Liberal Democrats	Theresa O'Toole	573	13.3	−1.3
Reform	Mihai Coltea-Radu	533	12.3	New
Reform	Obinna Umere	462	10.7	New
Independent	Lilly Morris	412	9.5	New
Turnout		4,322	39.5	+4.2
Labour hold		Swing		
Labour hold		Swing		
Conservative gain from Labour		Swing	15.4	

=== Hounslow South ===
Hounslow South (3)
Party	Candidate	Votes	%	±%
Labour	Tom Bruce*	1,618	36.8	−25.8
Labour	Karen Smith*	1,429	32.5	−23.1
Labour	Scott Hill	1,339	30.5	−18.1
Green	Lili Bakó	927	21.1	+2.6
Liberal Democrats	Krishna Valluru	876	19.9	+5.6
Reform	Chris Hack	835	19.0	New
Liberal Democrats	Syed Ali	810	18.4	+4.1
Liberal Democrats	Miruna Leitoiu	769	17.5	+3.2
Reform	Gary Murphy	728	16.6	New
Conservative	Rod st Croix	723	16.4	−7.4
Reform	Oliwia Moszczynska	704	16.0	New
Conservative	Neil Peters	704	16.0	−7.8
Conservative	Charles McManus-Burke	673	15.3	−8.5
TUSC	Neal Jeffery	119	2.7	New
Turnout		4,397	43.6	+6.8
Labour hold		Swing		
Labour hold		Swing		
Labour hold		Swing		

=== Hounslow West ===
Hounslow West (3)
Party	Candidate	Votes	%	±%
Conservative	Allister De Sa	1,851	41.7	+16.7
Conservative	Vivek Ganachari	1,655	37.3	+14.5
Conservative	Charmi Parmar	1,590	35.8	+17.3
Labour	Darshan Khosa	1,227	27.7	−26.6
Labour	Emma Siddhu	1,118	25.2	−28.9
Labour	Harjot Sekhon	1,090	24.6	−29.7
Green	Nick de Voil	799	18.0	+3.4
Reform	Visalakshi Borpatla	761	17.2	New
Reform	Ravinder Singh	713	16.1	New
Reform	Gobind Verma	639	14.4	New
Liberal Democrats	Carl Pierce	462	10.4	−4.4
Independent	Gabriel Dcunha	405	9.1	New
Turnout		4,436	39.7	+7.5
Conservative gain from Labour		Swing	+18.4	
Conservative gain from Labour		Swing	+16.1	
Conservative gain from Labour		Swing	+13.0	

=== Isleworth ===
Isleworth (3)
Party	Candidate	Votes	%	±%
Labour	Sue Sampson*	1,658	38.5	−22.9
Labour	Salman Shaheen*	1,544	35.9	−17.1
Liberal Democrats	Roger Crouch	1,364	31.7	+7.0
Labour	John Stroud-Turp*	1,345	31.2	−17.2
Liberal Democrats	Robert Thorpe	1,050	24.4	−0.3
Liberal Democrats	Judith Trounson	1,048	24.3	+5.0
Green	Anthony Agius	976	22.7	+2.5
Reform	Wagdy Michael	673	15.6	New
Reform	Zinaida Boghiu	598	13.9	New
Reform	Ashwini Parulekar	582	13.5	New
Conservative	Suparna Rathi	414	9.6	−8.4
Conservative	Sapphire Wagu	403	9.4	−8.1
Conservative	Shane Wagu	379	8.8	−8.3
TUSC	John Viner	102	2.4	New
Turnout		4,305	44.6	+8.1
Labour hold		Swing		
Labour hold		Swing		
Liberal Democrats gain from Labour		Swing	8.5	

=== Osterley & Spring Grove ===
Osterley & Spring Grove (3)
Party	Candidate	Votes	%	±%
Labour	Tony Louki*	1,657	39.2	−20.9
Labour	Unsa Chaudri*	1,539	36.5	−13.2
Labour	Ranjit Gill	1,425	33.7	−10.9
Conservative	Jason Harcourt	1,095	25.9	−5.5
Conservative	Christopher Raynor	1,010	23.9	−5.9
Green	Sara Novakovic	988	23.4	+7.3
Conservative	Sheetal Tiwari	954	22.6	−5.3
Reform	Xavier Fernandes	571	13.5	New
Reform	Scott Parkins	553	13.1	New
Liberal Democrats	Thomas Fidler	548	13.0	−3.0
Liberal Democrats	Millicent Brooks	483	11.4	−4.6
Reform	Jenson Zhu	457	10.8	New
Liberal Democrats	Christopher Holman	442	10.5	−5.5
Turnout		4,222	40.4	+6.1
Labour hold		Swing		
Labour hold		Swing		
Labour hold		Swing		

=== Syon & Brentford Lock ===
Syon & Brentford Lock (3)
Party	Candidate	Votes	%	±%
Labour	Dan Bowring*	1,284	35.3	−14.1
Labour	Katherine Dunne*	1,276	35.1	−17.7
Brentford & Isleworth Independent	Theo Dennison*	1,098	30.2	+0.5
Labour	Jennifer Prain	1,031	28.4	−10.6
Green	Namaa Al-Mahdi	903	24.9	+2.3
Brentford & Isleworth Independent	Joshua Harwood	633	17.4	New
Brentford & Isleworth Independent	Dave Waller	602	16.6	New
Reform	Kevin Cronin	532	14.6	New
Reform	Nicola Thrower	456	12.6	New
Reform	Shashi Kumar	409	11.3	New
Conservative	Max Booth	398	11.0	−9.7
Liberal Democrats	Lionel Girling	364	10.0	−3.1
Conservative	Sam Hearn	352	9.7	−10.0
Liberal Democrats	Phyllis van der Esch	298	8.2	−5.9
Conservative	David Mayes	296	8.2	−12.5
Independent	Aarti Nayak	96	2.6	New
Turnout		3,632	40.5	+7.2
Labour hold		Swing		
Labour hold		Swing		
Brentford & Isleworth Independent gain from Labour		Swing	4.4	
