= Feltham West =

Electoral ward in London, England

- Electoral ward for the Hounslow London Borough Council
- Borough: Hounslow
- County: Greater London
- Population: 16,223 (2021)
- Electorate: 10,894 (2026)
- Major settlements: Feltham
- Area: 3.184 km²

Current electoral ward
- Created: 2002
- Councillors: Madeeha Asim; Tony Brown; Alan Mitchell

Feltham West is an electoral ward in the London Borough of Hounslow. The ward was first used in the 2002 elections and elects three councillors to Hounslow London Borough Council. The ward was previously used from 1964 to 1978.

== Geography ==
The ward is named after the town of Feltham.

== Councillors ==
Election	Councillors		
2026	Madeeha Asim (Labour and Co-op)	Tony Brown (Reform)	Alan Mitchell (Labour)
2022	Madeeha Asim (Labour and Co-op)	Hina Mir (Labour)	Alan Mitchell (Labour)

== Elections ==
=== 2026 Hounslow London Borough Council election ===
Feltham West (3)
Party	Candidate	Votes	%	±%
Labour	Madeeha Asim	1,345	30.5	−21.5
Reform	Tony Brown	1,339	30.3	New
Labour	Alan Mitchell	1,335	30.3	−27.8
Labour	Malwina Kukaj	1,211	27.4	−24.3
Reform	Christopher Wrightson	1,204	27.3	New
Reform	Chinmay Parulekar	1,106	25.1	New
Conservative	Steve Redknap	863	19.6	−13.6
Conservative	Rashi Chabra	812	18.4	−14.7
Conservative	Manoj Kumar Srirangam	803	18.2	−14.0
Green	Ross Cameron Baillie	739	16.7	+0.1
Independent	Nii Anum	466	10.6	New
Independent	Alex Campbell	437	9.9	New
Liberal Democrats	Riza Polat	341	7.7	New
Independent	Muhammad Lebbe	168	3.8	New
Turnout		4,412	40.5	+12.2
Labour hold		Swing		
Reform gain from Labour		Swing	15.2	
Labour hold		Swing		

=== 2022 Hounslow London Borough Council election ===
Feltham West (3)
Party	Candidate	Votes	%	±%
Labour	Alan Mitchell	1,752	58.1	
Labour	Madeeha Asim	1,567	52.0	
Labour	Hina Mir	1,557	51.7	
Conservative	Manoj Kumar Srirangam	1,000	33.2	
Conservative	Sonia Luther	997	33.1	
Conservative	Vanita Kanda	970	32.2	
Green	Christina Dawn Gorst Ellis	501	16.6	
Turnout		3,013		
Labour hold		Swing		
Labour hold		Swing		
Labour hold		Swing		
