= Uday Nagaraju, Baron Nagaraju =

British politician (born 1979)

The Right Honourable The Lord Nagaraju of Bloomsbury
- Official portrait, 2026

Member of the House of Lords
- Lord Temporal
- Life peerage 29 January 2026

Personal details
- Born: 1979 (age 46–47) Telangana, India
- Party: Labour

Udaykumar Nagaraju, Baron Nagaraju (born September 1979) is a British Labour politician.

== Career ==
Nagaraju was born in Telangana. He is a computer technology graduate from Kavikulguru Institute of Technology and Science, Ramtek (Class of 1996-2000, RTM Nagpur University). He is a technology and AI consultant by profession.

== Technology career ==
In addition to his political work, Nagaraju is the founder and director of AI Policy Labs, a policy organisation focused on artificial intelligence governance and public policy.

== Political career ==
Nagaraju was a Labour candidate for Chiswick Gunnersbury ward in the 2022 Hounslow London Borough Council election, finishing fifth. Nagaraju stood unsuccessfully to be the candidate for Milton Keynes North, losing to Chris Curtis by 83% to 17% (151 votes to 31 votes). Nagaraju was adopted as the Labour candidate for the North Bedfordshire constituency at the 2024 United Kingdom general election, having been the only candidate on the shortlist, before losing to Richard Fuller. He was nominated for a life peerage as part of the 2025 Political Peerages; he was created as Baron Nagaraju, of Bloomsbury in the London Borough of Camden on 29 January 2026.
