= Cranford (ward) =

Electoral ward in London Borough of Hounslow

- Electoral ward for the Hounslow London Borough Council
- Cranford ward boundaries since 2022
- Borough: Hounslow
- County: Greater London
- Population: 16,027 (2021) (Note: 2021 Census data reported for 2022 ward boundaries)
- Electorate: 10,584 (2022)
- Area: 3.602 square kilometres (1.391 sq mi)

Current electoral ward
- Created: 1965
- Number of members: 3
- Councillors: Vilber Mark DeCosta; Hira Dhillon; Gurpreet Singh Sidhu
- GSS code: E05013612

Cranford is an electoral ward in the London Borough of Hounslow. The ward has existed since the creation of the borough on 1 April 1965 and was first used in the 1964 elections. It returns three councillors to Hounslow London Borough Council.

== Councillors ==
The councillor list is sourced from Hounslow Council election results, the Local Elections Archive Project and the Elections Centre.

Election	Councillors		
2026	Vilber Mark DeCosta (Conservative)	Hira Singh Dhillon (Labour)	Gurpreet Singh Sidhu (Conservative)
2022	Ghazala Butt (Labour)	Sukhbir Singh Dhaliwal (Labour)	Vickram Singh Grewal (Labour) (Conservative since 2025)
2018	Sukhbir Singh Dhaliwal (Labour)	Poonam Dhillon (Labour)	Khulique Ahmed Malik (Labour)
2014	Sohan Singh Sangha (Labour)	Daanish Saeed (Labour)	Gurpal Singh Virdi (Labour)
2010	John Chatt (Labour)	Poonam Dhillon (Labour)	Sohan Singh Sangha (Labour)
2006	Poonam Dhillon (Labour)	Mohammed Chaudhary (Labour)	Sohan Singh Sangha (Labour)
2002	Sarbjit Singh Gill (Labour)	Parmod Kad (Labour)	Sohan Singh Sangha (Labour)
1998	J. Dhillon (Labour)	S. Dhaliwal (Labour)	H. Kanwal (Labour)
1994	S. Dhaliwal (Labour)	J. Khangura (Labour)	J. Virk (Labour)
1990	H. North (Labour)	H. Kanwal (Labour)	J. Khangura (Labour)
1986	R. Padley (Labour)	H. Kanwal (Labour)	J. Khangura (Labour)
1982	W. Boyce (Labour)	H. North (Labour)	H. Kanwal (Labour)
1978	W. Boyce (Labour)	K. Butler (Labour)	F. Powe (Labour)
1974	W. Boyce (Labour)	E. Phipps (Labour)	F. Powe (Labour)
1971	E. Phipps (Labour)	F. Powe (Labour)	W. Boyce (Labour)
1968	C. Hainsworth (Conservative)	J. Horley (Conservative)	N. Wilkinson (Conservative)
1964	W. Boyce (Labour)	M. Watts (Labour)	R. Padley (Labour)

== Hounslow council elections since 2022 ==
=== 2026 election ===
The election took place on 7 May 2026.

2026 Hounslow London Borough Council election: Cranford (3)
Party	Candidate	Votes	%	±%
Conservative	Vilber Mark DeCosta	1,541	38.4	+16.8
Conservative	Gurpreet Singh Sidhu	1,439	35.8	+14.5
Labour	Hira Singh Dhillon	1,387	34.6	−25.6
Conservative	Prachi Vadsola	1,200	29.9	+11.1
Labour	Marina Cheri Sharma	1,170	29.1	−30.9
Labour	Sayyar Raza	1,128	28.1	−28.9
Green	Gill Chapman	818	20.4	+4.4
Reform	Rebecca Howard	667	16.6	New
Reform	Raj Kumari	496	12.4	New
Reform	Yash Pal Sunda	451	11.2	New
Liberal Democrats	Renu Raj	422	10.5	New
Turnout		4,014	36.7	+6.2
Conservative gain from Labour		Swing	8.4	
Conservative gain from Labour		Swing	7.1	
Labour hold		Swing		

=== 2025 by-election ===
The by-election took place on 21 August 2025, following the death of Sukhbir Dhaliwal.

2025 Cranford by-election
Party	Candidate	Votes	%	±%
Labour	Hira Dhillon	951	40.7	−12.6
Conservative	Gurpreet Sidhu	679	29.1	+10.0
Reform	Khushwant Singh	405	17.3	New
Green	Gurpal Virdi	156	6.7	−7.5
Liberal Democrats	Miruna Leitoiu	145	6.2	New
Turnout				
Labour hold		Swing		

=== 2022 election ===
The election took place on 5 May 2022.

2022 Hounslow London Borough Council election: Cranford (3)
Party	Candidate	Votes	%	±%
Labour	Sukhbir Dhaliwal	1,949	60.2	
Labour	Vickram Grewal	1,942	60.0	
Labour	Ghazala Butt	1,843	57.0	
Conservative	Vaibhav Mistry	698	21.6	
Conservative	Sheekeba Nasimi	690	21.3	
Conservative	Mohamad Jarche	608	18.8	
Green	Gurpal Sindhar	519	16.0	
Independent	Gurpal Virdi	489	15.1	
Turnout		3,235		
Labour win (new boundaries)				
Labour win (new boundaries)				
Labour win (new boundaries)				

== 2002–2022 Hounslow council elections ==
Cranford ward boundaries from 2002 to 2022

There was a revision of ward boundaries in Hounslow in 2002.

=== 2021 by-election ===
The by-election took place on 6 May 2021, following the death of Poonam Dhillon. It was held on the same day as the 2021 London mayoral election and 2021 London Assembly election.

2021 Cranford by-election
Party	Candidate	Votes	%	±%
Labour	Devina Ram	2,129	52.0	−13.7
Conservative	Shabnam Nasimi	1,191	29.1	+4.7
Independent	Gurpal Virdi	355	8.7	+8.7
Green	Martin Bleach	284	6.9	+2.5
Liberal Democrats	Sangam Gul	133	3.3	−2.3
Majority		938	22.9	
Turnout		4,092		
Labour hold		Swing		

=== 2018 election ===
The election took place on 3 May 2018.

2018 Hounslow London Borough Council election: Cranford (3)
Party	Candidate	Votes	%	±%
Labour	Sukhbir Dhaliwal	2,113	64.2	
Labour	Poonam Dhillon	2,039	62.0	
Labour	Khulique Malik	1,853	56.3	
Conservative	Sukhdev Maras	784	23.8	
Conservative	Eileen Newton	651	19.8	
Conservative	Renu Raj	624	19.0	
Liberal Democrats	Iman Malik	180	5.5	
Liberal Democrats	Sangam Gul	163	5.0	
Green	Jon Elkon	141	4.3	
Green	Freya Summersgill	135	4.1	
Green	Jack Ridley	132	4.0	
Liberal Democrats	Deborah Owoade	123	3.7	
Turnout				
Labour hold		Swing		
Labour hold		Swing		
Labour hold		Swing		
