= Hanworth Park (ward) =

Electoral ward in London, England

- Electoral ward for the Hounslow London Borough Council
- Borough: Hounslow
- County: Greater London
- Population: 10,403 (2021)
- Electorate: 7,430 (2026)
- Major settlements: Hanworth Park
- Area: 2.935 km²

Current electoral ward
- Created: 2002
- Councillors: Johan Lindsten; Adrian Page

Hanworth Park is an electoral ward in the London Borough of Hounslow. The ward was first used in the 2002 elections and elects two councillors to Hounslow London Borough Council.

== Geography ==
The ward is named after the suburb of Hanworth Park.

== Councillors ==
| Election | Councillors | |
|---|---|---|
| 2026 | Johan Lindsten (Reform) | Adrian Page (Reform) |
| 2022 | Bishnu Bahadur Gurung (Labour) | Farah Kamran (Labour and Co-operative) |

== Elections ==
=== 2026 Hounslow London Borough Council election ===
Hanworth Park (2)
| Party | Candidate | Votes | % | ±% |
|---|---|---|---|---|
| Reform | Johan Lindsten | 988 | 32.1 | New |
| Reform | Adrian Page | 968 | 31.5 | New |
| Labour | Samantha Emma Christie | 881 | 28.7 | −19.5 |
| Labour | Farah Kamran | 852 | 27.7 | −18.0 |
| Conservative | Joseph Allfrey Lobo | 672 | 21.9 | −13.9 |
| Conservative | Carl Vaz | 588 | 19.1 | −11.1 |
| Green | David James Bates | 541 | 17.6 | +2.8 |
| Liberal Democrats | Simon Timothy Martin | 349 | 11.3 | −1.8 |
| Turnout | | 3,075 | 41.4 | +10.6 |
| Reform gain from Labour | | Swing | 24.8 | |
| Reform gain from Labour | | Swing | 23.6 | |

=== 2022 Hounslow London Borough Council election ===
Hanworth Park (2)
| Party | Candidate | Votes | % | ±% |
|---|---|---|---|---|
| Labour | Bishnu Bahadur Gurung | 1,037 | 48.2 | |
| Labour | Farah Kamran | 983 | 45.7 | |
| Conservative | Ran Manike Maliyadde | 769 | 35.8 | |
| Conservative | Adamya Raj | 649 | 30.2 | |
| Green | Tom Beaton | 318 | 14.8 | |
| Liberal Democrats | Liz Trayhorn | 282 | 13.1 | |
| Turnout | | 2,150 | 30.8 | |
| Labour hold | | Swing | | |
| Labour hold | | Swing | | |
