= Isleworth (ward) =

Electoral ward in London, England

- Electoral ward for the Hounslow London Borough Council
- Isleworth ward boundaries since 2022
- Borough: Hounslow
- County: Greater London
- Population: 13,799 (2021)
- Electorate: 9,653 (2026)
- Major settlements: Isleworth
- Area: 1.892 km²

Current electoral ward
- Created: 2002
- Councillors: Sue Sampson; Salman Shaheen; Roger Crouch

Isleworth is an electoral ward in the London Borough of Hounslow. The ward was first used in the 2002 elections and elects three councillors to Hounslow London Borough Council.

== Geography ==
The ward is named after the town of Isleworth.

== Councillors ==
Election	Councillors		
2026	Sue Sampson (Labour)	Salman Shaheen (Labour)	Roger Crouch (Liberal Democrats)
2022	Sue Sampson (Labour)	Salman Shaheen (Labour)	John Stroud-Turp (Labour and Co-operative)

== Elections ==
=== 2026 Hounslow London Borough Council election ===
Isleworth (3)
Party	Candidate	Votes	%	±%
Labour	Sue Sampson	1,658	38.5	−22.9
Labour	Salman Haroun Shaheen	1,544	35.9	−17.1
Liberal Democrats	Roger Michael Crouch	1,364	31.7	+7.0
Labour	John Robert Stroud-Turp	1,345	31.2	−17.2
Liberal Democrats	Robert Thorpe	1,050	24.4	+5.1
Liberal Democrats	Judith Trounson	1,048	24.3	
Green	Anthony William John Agius	976	22.7	+2.5
Reform	Wagdy Michael	673	15.6	New
Reform	Zinaida Boghiu	598	13.9	New
Reform	Ashwini Parulekar	582	13.5	New
Conservative	Suparna Rathi	414	9.6	−8.4
Conservative	Sapphire Wagu	403	9.4	−8.1
Conservative	Shane Wagu	379	8.8	−8.3
TUSC	John Nelson Viner	102	2.4	New
Turnout		4,305	44.6	
Labour hold		Swing		
Labour hold		Swing		
Liberal Democrats gain from Labour		Swing	14.9	

=== 2022 Hounslow London Borough Council election ===
Isleworth (3)
Party	Candidate	Votes	%	±%
Labour	Sue Sampson	2,124	61.4	
Labour	Salman Haroun Shaheen	1,832	53.0	
Labour	John Robert Stroud-Turp	1,672	48.4	
Liberal Democrats	Robert Campbell Thorpe	855	24.7	
Green	David Peter Faure Juritz	697	20.2	
Liberal Democrats	Joseph Gerald Bourke	669	19.3	
Conservative	Al Al-ayoby	622	18.0	
Conservative	Muhammad Umar Awais	606	17.5	
Conservative	Khalid Omar Warsame	593	17.1	
Turnout		3,458		
Labour hold		Swing		
Labour hold		Swing		
Labour hold		Swing		
