= Brentford West =

Electoral ward in the London Borough of Hounslow, England

- Electoral ward for the Hounslow London Borough Council
- Brentford West ward boundaries since 2022
- Borough: Hounslow
- County: Greater London
- Population: 7,879 (2021) (Note: 2021 Census data reported for 2022 ward boundaries)
- Electorate: 5,928 (2026)
- Area: 1.309 square kilometres (0.505 sq mi)

Current electoral ward
- Created: 2022
- Number of members: 2
- Councillors: Guy Lambert; Craig Owen
- Created from: Brentford
- Replaced by: Brentford West
- GSS code: E05013608

Brentford West is an electoral ward in the London Borough of Hounslow. The ward was first used in the 2022 elections. It returns two councillors to Hounslow London Borough Council.

== Councillors ==
| Election | Councillors | |
|---|---|---|
| 2026 | Guy Lambert (Green) | Craig Owen (Labour) |
| 2022 | Guy Lambert (Labour) | Lara Parizotto (Labour) |

== Hounslow council elections ==
=== 2026 election ===
The election was held on 7 May 2026, as part of the 2026 United Kingdom local elections.

2026 Hounslow London Borough Council election: Brentford West
| Party | Candidate | Votes | % | ±% |
|---|---|---|---|---|
| Green | Guy Lambert | 1,078 | 40.0 | +10.7 |
| Labour | Craig Owen | 836 | 31.0 | −20.8 |
| Green | Rashid Wahab | 670 | 24.8 | +8.7 |
| Labour | Husna Hashmi | 640 | 23.7 | −25.3 |
| Reform | Bob Ayres | 374 | 13.9 | New |
| Liberal Democrats | Joe Bourke | 315 | 11.7 | New |
| Reform | Gordon Turner | 311 | 11.5 | New |
| Conservative | Jeremy Christian Larrson | 265 | 9.8 | −8.1 |
| Independent | Scott Anthony Warren Illman | 252 | 9.3 | New |
| Liberal Democrats | Gary Sydney Padbury | 249 | 9.2 | New |
| Conservative | Radhesham Chauhan | 226 | 8.4 | −8.8 |
| Registered electors | | 5,928 | | |
| Turnout | | 2,968 | 45.5 | +9.4 |
| Green gain from Labour | | Swing | 15.8 | |
| Labour hold | | Swing | | |

=== 2024 by-election ===
The by-election was held on 2 May 2024, following the resignation of Lara Parizotto. It took place on the same day as the 2024 London mayoral election, the 2024 London Assembly election and 14 other borough council by-elections across London.

2024 Brentford West by-election
| Party | Candidate | Votes | % | ±% |
|---|---|---|---|---|
| Labour | Emma Yates | 988 | 36.4 | |
| Independent | Theo Dennison | 798 | 29.4 | |
| Conservative | Michael Denniss | 414 | 15.2 | |
| Green | Freya Summersgill | 338 | 12.4 | |
| Liberal Democrats | Will Francis | 126 | 4.6 | |
| TUSC | John Viner | 33 | 1.2 | |
| Registered electors | | 6,021 | | |
| Turnout | | 2,716 | 45.1 | |
| Labour hold | | | | |

=== 2022 election ===
The election took place on 5 May 2022.

2022 Hounslow London Borough Council election: Brentford West
| Party | Candidate | Votes | % | ±% |
|---|---|---|---|---|
| Labour | Guy Lambert | 1,183 | 51.8 | |
| Labour | Lara Parizotto | 1,119 | 49.0 | |
| Green | Stephen Paul Clark | 669 | 29.3 | |
| Conservative | Michael James Annear Denniss | 410 | 17.9 | |
| Conservative | Zoe Louise Nixon | 392 | 17.2 | |
| Green | Tony Firkins | 367 | 16.1 | |
| Independent | Bob Ayres | 226 | 9.9 | |
| Turnout | | 2,285 | 36.1 | |
| Labour win (new seat) | | | | |
| Labour win (new seat) | | | | |
