= Thamesbank Credit Union =

British not-for-profit member-owned financial co-operative

- Founded: 2005
- Type: Industrial and Provident Society
- Location: The Bungalow, Harlington Community School, Pinkwell Lane, Hayes, Middx. UB3 1PB
- Website: thamesbank.org

Thamesbank Credit Union Limited is a not-for-profit member-owned financial co-operative, based in Hayes and operating in the south west London Boroughs of Hounslow, Richmond upon Thames, Wandsworth, Kingston upon Thames and the Spelthorne district in Surrey.

The credit union was formed in 2005, as the London Borough of Hounslow Employees Credit Union, before extending the common bond to the local community and adopting the current name in 2007.

A member of the Association of British Credit Unions Limited, registered under the Industrial and Provident Societies Acts, Thamesbank Credit Union is authorised by the Prudential Regulation Authority and regulated by the Financial Conduct Authority and PRA. Ultimately, like the banks and building societies, members' savings are protected against business failure by the Financial Services Compensation Scheme.

== See also ==
- Credit unions in the United Kingdom
- British co-operative movement
