= Chiswick Riverside =

Electoral ward in London, England

- Electoral ward for the Hounslow London Borough Council
- Borough: Hounslow
- County: Greater London
- Population: 10,301 (2021)
- Electorate: 7,746 (2026)
- Major settlements: Chiswick
- Area: 1.435 km²

Current electoral ward
- Created: 1978
- Councillors: Amy Croft; Gabriella Giles; Rick Rowe

Chiswick Riverside is an electoral ward in the London Borough of Hounslow. The ward was first used in the 1978 elections and elects three councillors to Hounslow London Borough Council.

== Geography ==
The ward is named after the Riverside area of Chiswick.

== Councillors ==
The councillor list is sourced from Hounslow Council election results, the Local Elections Archive Project and the Elections Centre.

Election	Councillors		
2026	Amy Croft (Labour)	Gabriella Giles (Conservative)	Rick Rowe (Green)
2022	Amy Croft (Labour)	Gabriella Giles (Conservative)	Peter Thompson (Conservative)
2018	Sam Hearn (Conservative)	Michael Denniss (Conservative)	Gabriella Giles (Conservative)
2014	Sam Hearn (Conservative)	Felicity Barwood (Conservative)	Paul Lynch (Conservative)
2010	Sam Hearn (Conservative)	Felicity Barwood (Conservative)	Paul Lynch (Conservative)
2006	Felicity Barwood (Conservative)	Robert Kinghorn (Conservative)	Paul Lynch (Conservative)
2002	Paul Lynch (Conservative)	Felicity Barwood (Conservative)	Robert Kinghorn (Conservative)
1998	J. Langton (Conservative)	P. Lynch (Conservative)	R. Kinghorn (Conservative)
1994	J. Langton (Conservative)	P. Lynch (Conservative)	R. Kinghorn (Conservative)
1990	J. Langton (Conservative)	R. Kinghorn (Conservative)	P. Lynch (Conservative)
1986	P. Betlem (Conservative)	R. Kinghorn (Conservative)	J. Langton (Conservative)
1982	P. Betlem (Conservative)	R. Avery (Conservative)	J. Langton (Conservative)
1978	P. Betlem (Conservative)	M. Bickford-Smith (Conservative)	R. Avery (Conservative)

== Elections ==
=== 2026 Hounslow London Borough Council election ===
Chiswick Riverside (3)
Party	Candidate	Votes	%	±%
Labour	Amy Croft	1,387	36.4	−0.1
Conservative	Gabriella Giles	1,202	31.5	−6.4
Green	Rick Rowe	1,184	31.1	+13.5
Conservative	Peter Thompson	1,146	30.1	−7.2
Conservative	Jessika Toto-Moukouo	949	24.9	−11.3
Green	Muddassir Syed	896	23.5	+7.9
Labour	Trevor Macfarlane	865	22.7	−9.8
Labour	Gurminder Randhawa	820	21.5	−10.3
Liberal Democrats	Frank Beddington	627	16.4	−0.2
Liberal Democrats	Nicholas Bellerophon	472	12.4	−3.3
Liberal Democrats	James Nicholas Charrington	362	9.5	New
Reform	James Kerr	327	8.6	New
Reform	Royen Prince Fernandes	295	7.7	New
Reform	George Radulski	283	7.4	New
Turnout		3,812	49.2	+8.6
Labour hold		Swing		
Conservative hold		Swing		
Green gain from Conservative		Swing	6.8	

=== 2022 Hounslow London Borough Council election ===
Chiswick Riverside (3)
Party	Candidate	Votes	%	±%
Conservative	Gabriella Sabrina Gonzalez Giles	1,105	37.9	
Conservative	Peter Thompson	1,087	37.3	
Labour	Amy Michelle Croft	1,064	36.5	
Conservative	Sebastian Paul Wallace	1,055	36.2	
Labour	Gurbachan Singh Athwal	948	32.5	
Labour	Melvin Barrie Collins	926	31.8	
Green	Andrea Marsha Louise Black	513	17.6	
Liberal Democrats	Charles Rees	485	16.6	
Liberal Democrats	Guy De Boursac	458	15.7	
Green	Elly Lewis-holmes	455	15.6	
Green	Bill Hagerty	362	12.4	
Turnout		2,913		
Conservative hold		Swing		
Conservative hold		Swing		
Labour gain from Conservative		Swing		
