= Chiswick Gunnersbury =

Electoral ward in London, England

- Electoral ward for the Hounslow London Borough Council
- Borough: Hounslow
- County: Greater London
- Population: 12,697 (2021)
- Electorate: 9,133 (2026)
- Major settlements: Gunnersbury
- Area: 2.594 km²

Current electoral ward
- Created: 2022
- Councillors: Joanna Biddolph; Ron Mushiso; Vickram Grewal

Chiswick Gunnersbury is an electoral ward in the London Borough of Hounslow. The ward was first used in the 2022 elections and elects three councillors to Hounslow London Borough Council.

== Geography ==
The ward is named after the Gunnersbury area of Chiswick.

== Councillors ==
Election	Councillors		
2026	Joanna Biddolph (Conservative)	Ron Mushiso (Conservative)	Vickram Grewal (Conservative)
2022	Joanna Biddolph (Conservative)	Ranjit Gill (Conservative) (Labour since 2025)	Ron Mushiso (Conservative)

== Elections ==
=== 2026 Hounslow London Borough Council election ===
Chiswick Gunnersbury (3)
Party	Candidate	Votes	%	±%
Conservative	Joanna Biddolph	1,709	40.7	−1.9
Conservative	Ron Mushiso	1,493	35.5	−3.0
Conservative	Vickram Grewal	1,382	32.9	−5.0
Labour	Maria Saroya	1,088	25.9	−11.4
Labour	Hanif Ahmad Khan	1,017	24.2	−9.1
Green	Aubrey Mark Charles Crawley	999	23.8	New
Green	Jon Elkon	949	22.6	New
Labour	Naeem Ulfat	776	18.5	−14.7
Liberal Democrats	Guy de Boursac	559	13.3	−9.7
Liberal Democrats	Paul Jonathan Halliwell	524	12.5	−9.5
Liberal Democrats	Nik Hole	471	11.2	−6.8
Reform	Joshua Stanton	337	8.0	New
Reform	Leanne Yu	324	7.7	New
Reform	Sau Khuan Parkins	322	7.7	New
Turnout		4,200	46.0	+5.2
Conservative hold		Swing		
Conservative hold		Swing		
Conservative hold		Swing		

=== 2022 Hounslow London Borough Council election ===
Chiswick Gunnersbury (3)
Party	Candidate	Votes	%	±%
Conservative	Joanna Biddolph	1,552	42.6	
Conservative	Ron Mushiso	1,402	38.5	
Conservative	Ranjit Gill	1,382	37.9	
Labour	Emma Jane Yates	1,359	37.3	
Labour	Uday Nagaraju	1,215	33.3	
Labour	Hanif Ahmad Khan	1,210	33.2	
Liberal Democrats	William Francis	840	23.0	
Liberal Democrats	Helen Diana Cross	803	22.0	
Liberal Democrats	Johanna Katherine Guppy	657	18.0	
Turnout		3,645	40.8	
Conservative win (new seat)				
Conservative win (new seat)				
Conservative win (new seat)				
