= Hounslow West (ward) =

Electoral ward in London, England

- Electoral ward for the Hounslow London Borough Council
- Hounslow West ward boundaries since 2022
- Borough: Hounslow
- County: Greater London
- Population: 15,915 (2021)
- Electorate: 11,168 (2026)
- Major settlements: Hounslow
- Area: 1.539 square kilometres (0.594 sq mi)

Current electoral ward
- Created: 1965
- Number of members: 3
- Councillors: Allister De Sa; Vivek Ganachari; Charmi Parmar
- GSS codes: E05013624 (since 2022)

Hounslow West is an electoral ward in the London Borough of Hounslow. The ward was first used in the 1964 elections and elects three councillors to Hounslow London Borough Council.

== List of councillors ==
Election	Councillors		
2026	Allister De Sa (Conservative)	Vivek Ganachari (Conservative)	Charmi Parmar (Conservative)
2022	Bandna Chopra (Labour)	Jagdish Sharma (Labour)	Mohammed Umair (Labour)

== Hounslow council elections since 2022 ==
There was a revision of ward boundaries in Hounslow in 2022.

=== 2026 election ===
The election took place on 7 May 2026. Jagdish Sharma died in March 2026, with the by-election deferred until the May 2026 election. (Note: Casual vacancies occurring within six months of scheduled elections are not filled.)

2026 Hounslow London Borough Council election: Hounslow West (3)
Party	Candidate	Votes	%	±%
Conservative	Allister Cajetan De Sa	1,851	41.7	+16.7
Conservative	Vivek Krishna Ganachari	1,655	37.3	+14.5
Conservative	Charmi Nileshkumar Parmar	1,590	35.8	+17.3
Labour	Darshan Singh Khosa	1,227	27.7	−35.4
Labour	Emma Louise Siddhu	1,118	25.2	−34.6
Labour	Harjot Sekhon	1,090	24.6	−29.7
Green	Nick De Voil	799	18.0	+3.4
Reform	Visalakshi Borpatla	761	17.2	New
Reform	Ravinder Singh	713	16.1	New
Reform	Gobind Verma	639	14.4	New
Liberal Democrats	Carl Michael Pierce	462	10.4	−4.4
Independent	Gabriel Dcunha	405	9.1	New
Turnout		4,436	39.7	+7.5
Conservative gain from Labour		Swing	26.1	
Conservative gain from Labour		Swing		
Conservative gain from Labour		Swing		

=== 2022 election ===
The election took place on 5 May 2022.

2022 Hounslow London Borough Council election: Hounslow West (3)
Party	Candidate	Votes	%	±%
Labour	Bandna Chopra	2,112	63.1	
Labour	Jagdish Sharma	2,002	59.8	
Labour	Mohammed Umair	1,819	54.3	
Conservative	Ranveer Summan	837	25.0	
Conservative	Sudhakar Bhumana	765	22.8	
Conservative	Wafa Khider	618	18.5	
Liberal Democrats	Carl Pierce	494	14.8	
Green	Sergejs Adamovs	490	14.6	
Turnout		3,348	32.2	
Labour win (new boundaries)				
Labour win (new boundaries)				
Labour win (new boundaries)				

== 2002–2022 Hounslow council elections ==
Hounslow West ward boundaries from 2002 to 2022

There was a revision of ward boundaries in Hounslow in 2002.

=== 2018 election ===
The election took place on 3 May 2018.

2018 Hounslow London Borough Council election: Hounslow West (3)
Party	Candidate	Votes	%	±%
Labour	Bandna Chopra	2,206	63.7	+7.0
Labour	Jagdish Sharma	2,188	63.2	+1.5
Labour	Sohan Samra	2,025	58.5	−0.4
Conservative	Hareshkumar Bhalsod	788	22.8	+0.9
Conservative	Sandra Cullinane	717	20.7	+1.6
Conservative	Adamya Raj	679	19.6	+1.7
Green	Caroline Bridgman	282	8.1	−1.7
Green	Mariette Labelle	209	6.0	N/A
Liberal Democrats	Carl Pierce	205	5.9	−1.8
Liberal Democrats	Nital Doshi	186	5.4	N/A
Liberal Democrats	Simon Rowland	184	5.3	N/A
Green	David Juritz	176	5.1	N/A
Turnout				
Labour hold		Swing		
Labour hold		Swing		
Labour hold		Swing		
