= Hounslow South =

Electoral ward in London, England

- Electoral ward for the Hounslow London Borough Council
- Borough: Hounslow
- County: Greater London
- Population: 13,748 (2021)
- Electorate: 10,089 (2026)
- Major settlements: Hounslow
- Area: 2.103 km²

Current electoral ward
- Created: 1965
- Councillors: Tom Bruce; Karen Smith; Scott Hill

Hounslow South is an electoral ward in the London Borough of Hounslow. The ward was first used in the 1964 elections and elects three councillors to Hounslow London Borough Council.

== Geography ==
The ward is named after the suburb of Hounslow.

== Councillors ==
Election	Councillors		
2026	Tom Bruce (Labour)	Karen Smith (Labour and Co-operative)	Scott Hill (Labour)
2022	Tom Bruce (Labour)	Sayyar Raza (Labour)	Karen Smith (Labour and Co-operative)

== Elections ==
=== 2026 Hounslow London Borough Council election ===
Hounslow South (3)
Party	Candidate	Votes	%	±%
Labour	Tom Bruce	1,618	36.8	−25.8
Labour	Karen Smith	1,429	32.5	−23.1
Labour	Scott Hill	1,339	30.5	−18.1
Green	Lili Anna Bakó	927	21.1	+2.6
Liberal Democrats	Krishna Valluru	876	19.9	+5.6
Reform	Chris Hack	835	19.0	New
Liberal Democrats	Syed Muzammil Ali	810	18.4	
Liberal Democrats	Miruna Leitoiu	769	17.5	
Reform	Gary Raymond Murphy	728	16.6	New
Conservative	Rod De St Croix	723	16.4	−14.4
Reform	Oliwia Moszczynska	704	16.0	New
Conservative	Neil Peters	704	16.0	−9.5
Conservative	Charles McManus-Burke	673	15.3	−8.5
TUSC	Neal Stephen Jeffery	119	2.7	New
Turnout		4,397	43.6	
Labour hold		Swing		
Labour hold		Swing		
Labour hold		Swing		

=== 2022 Hounslow London Borough Council election ===
Hounslow South (3)
Party	Candidate	Votes	%	±%
Labour	Tom Bruce	2,279	62.6	
Labour	Karen Ruby Smith	2,024	55.6	
Labour	Sayyar Raza	1,770	48.6	
Conservative	Laura Elliott	1,122	30.8	
Conservative	Ekansh Sharma	930	25.5	
Conservative	Muraad Ali Chaudhry	866	23.8	
Green	Michael Trevenen Bull	674	18.5	
Liberal Democrats	Krishna Valluru	520	14.3	
Turnout		3,643		
Labour hold		Swing		
Labour hold		Swing		
Labour hold		Swing		
