= Hounslow London Borough Council =

Local authority in England

Type
- Type: London borough council of the London Borough of Hounslow
- Houses: Unicameral

Leadership
- Mayor: Ranjit Gill, Labour since 26 May 2026
- Leader: Shantanu Rajawat, Labour since 5 May 2022
- Chief Executive: Mandy Skinner since 25 February 2025

Structure
- Seats: 62 councillors
- Political groups: Administration (31) Labour (31) Other councillors (31) Conservative (17) Reform (8) Independent (3) Green (2) Liberal Democrat (1)
- Length of term: Whole council elected every four years

Elections
- Voting system: Plurality at-large (FPTP)
- Last election: 7 May 2026
- Next election: 2 May 2030

Meeting place
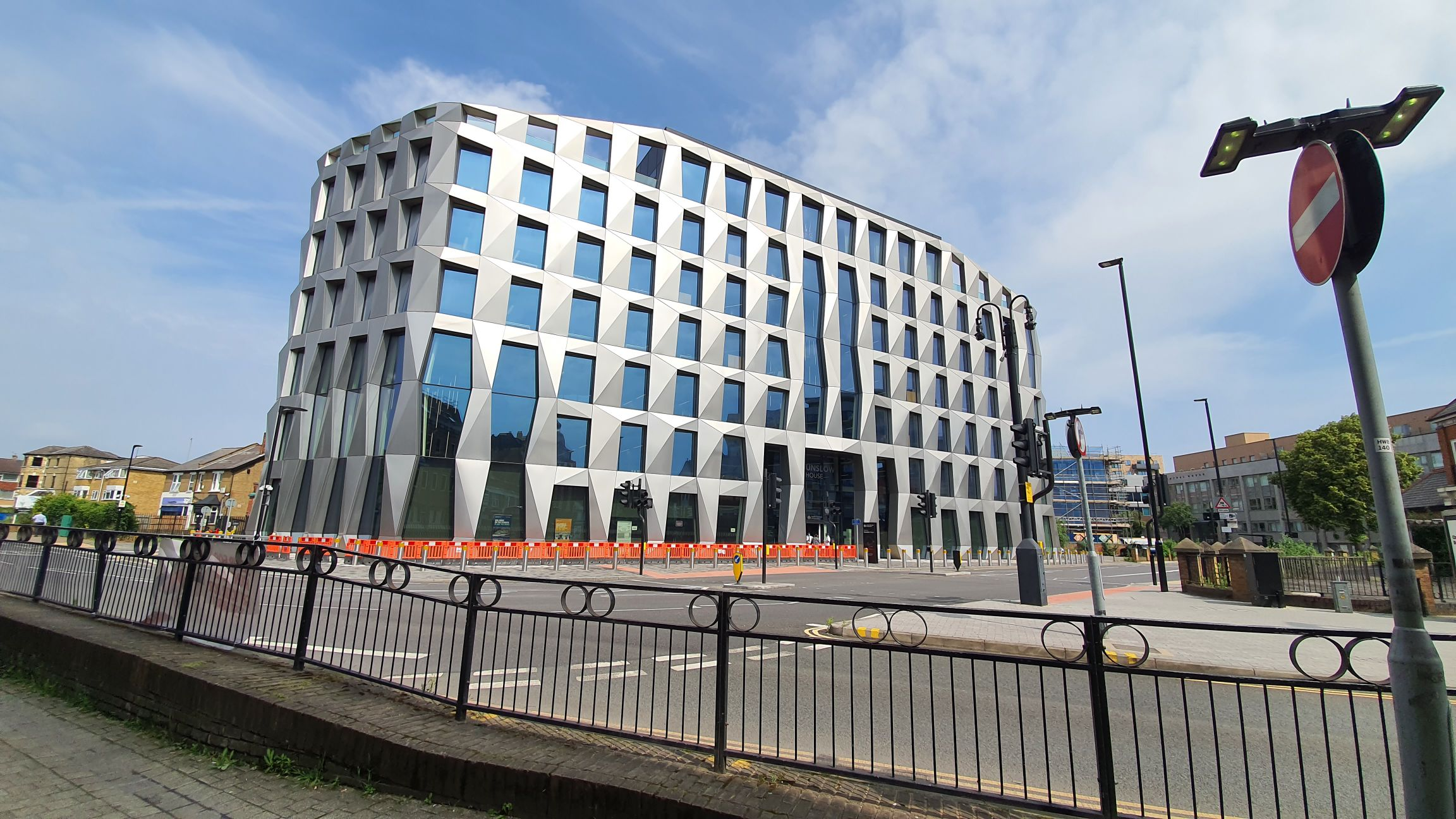
- Hounslow House, 7 Bath Road, Hounslow, TW3 3EB

Website
- www.hounslow.gov.uk

Hounslow London Borough Council, also known as Hounslow Council, is the local authority for the London Borough of Hounslow in Greater London, England. The council is based at Hounslow House on Bath Road in Hounslow. Following changes in councillors' political affiliations in October 2026, the council has no overall control, with the Labour Party continuing to lead a minority administration.

== History ==
The London Borough of Hounslow and its council were created under the London Government Act 1963, with the first election held in 1964. For its first year the council acted as a shadow authority alongside the area's three outgoing authorities, being the borough councils of Brentford and Chiswick and Heston and Isleworth and the urban district council of Feltham. The new council formally came into its powers on 1 April 1965, at which point the old districts and their councils were abolished. The council's full legal name is the "Mayor and Burgesses of the London Borough of Hounslow", although it styles itself Hounslow Council.

From 1965 until 1986 the council was a lower-tier authority, with upper-tier functions provided by the Greater London Council. The split of powers and functions meant that the Greater London Council was responsible for "wide area" services such as fire, ambulance, flood prevention, and refuse disposal; with the boroughs (including Hounslow) responsible for "personal" services such as social care, libraries, cemeteries and refuse collection. As an outer London borough council Hounslow has been a local education authority since 1965. The Greater London Council was abolished in 1986 and its functions passed to the London Boroughs, with some services provided through joint committees.

Since 2000 the Greater London Authority has taken some responsibility for highways and planning control from the council, but within the English local government system the council remains a "most purpose" authority in terms of the available range of powers and functions.

== Powers and functions ==
The local authority derives its powers and functions from the London Government Act 1963 and subsequent legislation, and has the powers and functions of a London borough council. It sets council tax and as a billing authority also collects precepts for Greater London Authority functions and business rates. It sets planning policies which complement Greater London Authority and national policies, and decides on almost all planning applications accordingly. It is also the local education authority.

== Political control ==
The council was under Labour majority control from 2010 until 2026. Following the 2026 local elections, Labour held 32 of the 62 seats, one more than the 31 needed for a majority. In October 2026, Councillor Gurbachan Athwal began sitting as an independent, leaving Labour with 31 seats. Later that month, Green councillor Guy Lambert also began sitting as an independent, reducing the Green group to two members. Labour remains the largest group and continues to lead a minority administration.

The first election was held in 1964, initially operating as a shadow authority alongside the outgoing authorities until it came into its powers on 1 April 1965. Political control of the council since 1965 has been as follows:

Party in control	Years
Labour	1965–1968
Conservative	1968–1971
Labour	1971–2006
No overall control	2006–2010
Labour	2010–2026
No overall control	2026–present

=== Leadership ===
The role of Mayor of Hounslow is largely ceremonial. Political leadership is instead provided by the leader of the council. The leaders since 1965 have been:

Councillor	Party	From	To
Alf King	Labour	1965	1968
Dyas Usher	Conservative	1968	1969
George Henniker	Conservative	1969	1971
Alf King	Labour	1971	1986
John Grigg	Labour	1986	1987
David Wetzel	Labour	1987	1991
John Chatt	Labour	1991	1999
John Connelly	Labour	1999	2002
John Chatt	Labour	2002	2004
Colin Ellar	Labour	18 May 2004	May 2006
Peter Thompson	Conservative	23 May 2006	May 2010
Jagdish Sharma	Labour	25 May 2010	Jun 2014
Steve Curran	Labour	10 Jun 2014	May 2022
Shantanu Rajawat	Labour	31 May 2022	

=== Composition ===
The composition of the council following changes in political affiliation in October 2026 is as follows:

Party	Councillors	Net change
Labour	31	↓ 1
Conservative	17	—
Reform	8	—
Independent	3	↑ 2
Green	2	↓ 1
Liberal Democrats	1	—
Total	62	—

The arrows indicate the net change in each group's number of councillors since the May 2026 election. A dash indicates no change.

The next election is due in May 2030.

== Wards ==
The wards of Hounslow and the number of seats:

1. Bedfont (3)
2. Brentford East (2)
3. Brentford West (2)
4. Chiswick Gunnersbury (3)
5. Chiswick Homefields (3)
6. Chiswick Riverside (3)
7. Cranford (3)
8. Feltham North (3)
9. Feltham West (3)
10. Hanworth Park (2)
11. Hanworth Village (3)
12. Heston Central (3)
13. Heston East (3)
14. Heston West (3)
15. Hounslow Central (3)
16. Hounslow East (2)
17. Hounslow Heath (3)
18. Hounslow South (3)
19. Hounslow West (3)
20. Isleworth (3)
21. Osterley & Spring Grove (3)
22. Syon & Brentford Lock (3)

== Elections ==
Since the last boundary changes in 2022 the council has comprised 62 councillors representing 22 wards, with each ward electing two or three councillors. Elections are held every four years.

== Premises ==
The council is based at Hounslow House at 7 Bath Road in Hounslow, which was purpose-built for the council and completed in 2019.

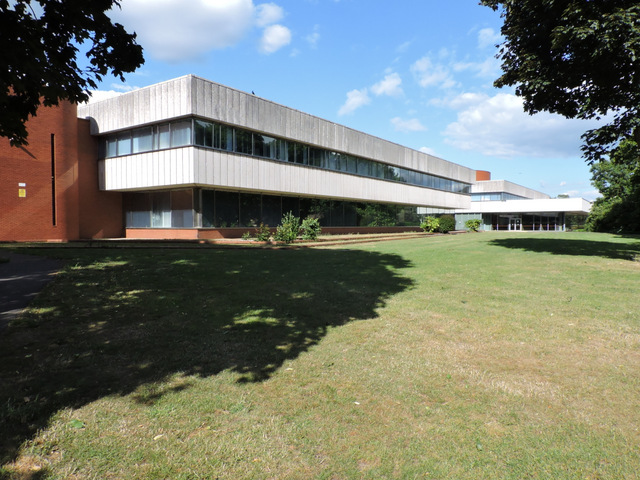
Hounslow Civic Centre: Council's headquarters 1975–2019

Prior to 2019 the council was based at Hounslow Civic Centre on Lampton Road, which had been completed in 1975.

== See also ==
- Thamesbank Credit Union
