= Heston East =

Electoral ward in London, England

- Electoral ward for the Hounslow London Borough Council
- Borough: Hounslow
- County: Greater London
- Population: 11,158 (2021)
- Electorate: 8,133 (2026)
- Major settlements: Heston
- Area: 1.700 km²

Current electoral ward
- Created: 1965
- Councillors: Jasmine Deol; Fiza Ahmed; Gurbachan Athwal

Heston East is an electoral ward in the London Borough of Hounslow. The ward was first used in the 1964 elections and elects three councillors to Hounslow London Borough Council.

== Geography ==
The ward is named after the eastern areas of the suburb of Heston.

== Councillors ==
Election	Councillors		
2026	Jasmine Deol (Green)	Fiza Ahmed (Labour)	Gurbachan Athwal (Labour)
2022	Aqsa Ahmed (Labour)	Gurmail Lal (Labour)	Amritpal Mann (Labour) (Workers Party of Britain since 2024)

== Elections ==
=== 2026 Hounslow London Borough Council election ===
Heston East (3)
Party	Candidate	Votes	%	±%
Green	Jasmine Deol	1,065	35.0	+21.0
Labour	Fiza Ahmed	977	32.1	−29.3
Labour	Gurbachan Athwal	977	32.1	−26.2
Labour	Gurmail Singh Lal	952	31.3	−21.7
Conservative	Nataliya Smith	719	23.6	−6.1
Conservative	Rugved Kirtikar	648	21.3	−6.1
Conservative	Ghassan Ahmadieh	627	20.6	−6.1
Reform	Pritpal Singh Mann	619	20.3	New
Reform	Bandna Chopra	613	20.1	New
Reform	Atamdeep Khosa	540	17.7	New
Liberal Democrats	Josefina Nvono-Ecoro	350	11.5	New
Turnout		3,046	37.5	+5.8
Green gain from Labour		Swing	29.7	
Labour hold		Swing		
Labour hold		Swing		

=== 2022 Hounslow London Borough Council election ===
Heston East (3)
Party	Candidate	Votes	%	±%
Labour	Gurmail Singh Lal	1,491	61.4	
Labour	Amritpal Singh Mann	1,415	58.3	
Labour	Aqsa Ahmed	1,288	53.0	
Conservative	Sonia Maya Dhiman	721	29.7	
Conservative	Hari Hrushikesh Borpatla	666	27.4	
Conservative	Krish Pisavadia	648	26.7	
Green	Zbynek Simcik	340	14.0	
Turnout		2,429	31.7	
Labour hold		Swing		
Labour hold		Swing		
Labour hold		Swing		
