= Heston West =

- Electoral ward for the Hounslow London Borough Council
- Heston West ward boundaries since 2022
- Borough: Hounslow
- County: Greater London
- Population: 15,730 (2021) (Note: 2021 Census data reported for 2022 ward boundaries)
- Electorate: 10,054 (2026)
- Area: 3.342 square kilometres (1.290 sq mi)

Current electoral ward
- Created: 1965
- Councillors: Lily Bath; Satwant Kaur; Shantanu Rajawat
- GSS code: E05013619

Heston West is an electoral ward in the London Borough of Hounslow. It returns three councillors to Hounslow London Borough Council.

== Hounslow council elections since 2022 ==
=== 2026 election ===
The election took place on 7 May 2026.

2026 Hounslow London Borough Council election: Heston West (3)
Party	Candidate	Votes	%	±%
Labour	Lily Bath	1,307	36.1	−33.1
Conservative	Satwant Kaur	1,269	35.1	+13.0
Labour	Shantanu Rajawat	1,105	30.6	−35.4
Labour	Edward Wall	1,018	28.1	−33.2
Conservative	Anthony Vincent Mascarenhas	925	25.6	+6.4
Conservative	Viralkumar Shah	835	23.1	+4.0
Green	Luke Myung Jay Lee	712	19.7	+3.2
Independent	Indrabir Singh Gill	653	18.1	New
Reform	Chris Beauchamp	457	12.6	New
Independent	Tamoor Khan	407	11.3	New
Independent	Chaitan Shah	400	11.1	New
Reform	Rajesh Tewari	393	10.9	New
Liberal Democrats	Darius Nasimi	275	7.6	New
Turnout		3,617	36.0	+7.6
Labour hold		Swing		
Conservative gain from Labour		Swing	24.2	
Labour hold		Swing		

=== 2023 by-election ===
The by-election took place on 9 March 2023, following the resignation of Adriana Gheorghe.

2023 Heston West by-election
Party	Candidate	Votes	%	±%
Labour	Emma Siddhu	1,104	52.4	
Liberal Democrats	Chaitan Shah	470	22.3	
Conservative	Muraad Chaudhry	419	19.9	
Green	Rashid Wahab	65	3.1	
Independent	Bart Kuleba	48	2.3	
Majority		634	30.1	
Turnout		2,106		
Labour hold		Swing		

=== 2022 election ===
The election took place on 5 May 2022.

2022 Hounslow London Borough Council election: Heston West (3)
Party	Candidate	Votes	%	±%
Labour	Adriana Gheorghe	1,998	69.2	
Labour	Shantanu Rajawat	1,906	66.0	
Labour	Karamat Ali Malik	1,768	61.3	
Conservative	Swarnjit Kamboh	637	22.1	
Conservative	Maha Jarche	553	19.2	
Conservative	Muhammad Azeem Anwar	550	19.1	
Green	Ann Thomas	475	16.5	
Turnout		2,886	28.4	
Labour win (new boundaries)				
Labour win (new boundaries)				
Labour win (new boundaries)				
