= Hounslow Heath (ward) =

Electoral ward in London, England

- Electoral ward for the Hounslow London Borough Council
- Borough: Hounslow
- County: Greater London
- Population: 16,075 (2021)
- Electorate: 10,944 (2026)
- Major settlements: Hounslow Heath
- Area: 2.788 km²

Current electoral ward
- Created: 1965
- Councillors: Samia Chaudhary; Sahibaa Hussain; Darshan Nagi

Hounslow Heath is an electoral ward in the London Borough of Hounslow. The ward was first used in the 1964 elections and elects three councillors to Hounslow London Borough Council.

== Geography ==
The ward is named after the area of Hounslow Heath.

== Councillors ==
Election	Councillors		
2026	Samia Chaudhary (Labour and Co-operative)	Sahibaa Hussain (Labour)	Darshan Nagi (Conservative)
2022	Samia Chaudhary (Labour and Co-operative)	Afzaal Kiani (Labour)	Farhaan Rehman (Labour)

== Elections ==
=== 2026 Hounslow London Borough Council election ===
Hounslow Heath (3)
Party	Candidate	Votes	%	±%
Labour	Samia Chaudhary	1,830	42.3	−16.3
Labour	Sahibaa Hussain	1,446	33.5	−18.6
Conservative	Darshan Nagi	1,358	31.4	+3.7
Labour	Farhaan Abdul Rehman	1,304	30.2	−19.4
Conservative	Umar Farooq	1,177	27.2	+7.2
Green	Stefan Edward Wells	1,147	26.5	+11.0
Reform	Monica Clare	883	20.4	New
Liberal Democrats	Warwick Bruce Francis	722	16.7	−2.4
Liberal Democrats	Theresa O'Toole	573	13.3	−1.3
Reform	Mihai Coltea-Radu	533	12.3	New
Reform	Obinna Umere	462	10.7	New
Independent	Lilly Morris	412	9.5	New
Turnout		4,322	39.5	+4.2
Labour hold		Swing		
Labour hold		Swing		
Conservative gain from Labour		Swing	15.4	

=== 2022 Hounslow London Borough Council election ===
Hounslow Heath (3)
Party	Candidate	Votes	%	±%
Labour	Samia Zafar Chaudhary	2,175	58.6	
Labour	Afzaal Ahmad Kiani	1,934	52.1	
Labour	Farhaan Abdul Rehman	1,841	49.6	
Conservative	Satvinder Pal Singh Buttar	1,028	27.7	
Conservative	Nada Mohamad Jarche	742	20.0	
Conservative	Sana Khalil Jarche	740	20.0	
Liberal Democrats	Sally Anne Billenness	708	19.1	
Green	Stefan Edward Wells	576	15.5	
Liberal Democrats	Warwick Bruce Francis	540	14.6	
Turnout		3,709	35.3	
Labour hold		Swing		
Labour hold		Swing		
Labour hold		Swing		
