= Hounslow Central (ward) =

Electoral ward in London, England

- Electoral ward for the Hounslow London Borough Council
- Borough: Hounslow
- County: Greater London
- Population: 10,660 (2021)
- Electorate: 7,591 (2026)
- Major settlements: Hounslow
- Area: 0.8252 km²

Current electoral ward
- Created: 1965
- Councillors: Pamila Rodrigues; Ajmer Grewal; Pritam Singh Grewal

Hounslow Central is an electoral ward in the London Borough of Hounslow. The ward was first used in the 1964 elections and elects three councillors to Hounslow London Borough Council.

== Geography ==
The ward is named after the suburb of Hounslow.

== Councillors ==
Election	Councillors		
2026	Pamila Rodrigues (Labour)	Ajmer Grewal (Labour)	Pritam Grewal (Labour)
2022	Rasheed Bhatti (Labour)	Ajmer Grewal (Labour)	Pritam Grewal (Labour)

== Elections ==
=== 2026 Hounslow London Borough Council election ===
Hounslow Central (3)
Party	Candidate	Votes	%	±%
Labour	Pamila Rodrigues	1,192	39.6	−20.1
Labour	Ajmer Grewal	1,104	36.7	−20.5
Labour	Pritam Singh Grewal	1,093	36.3	−19.8
Conservative	Malcolm Silveira	1,066	35.4	+5.1
Conservative	Theo Abraham	1,043	34.7	+6.6
Conservative	Rakesh Raut	960	31.9	+5.3
Green	Yousaf Munir Chand	584	19.4	+0.6
Reform	Theodore Charles	384	12.8	New
Liberal Democrats	Mohan Bains	356	11.8	New
Reform	Kathy Soulsbury	330	11.0	New
Reform	Neil Parkhouse	323	10.7	New
Turnout		3,008	39.7	+8.7
Labour hold		Swing		
Labour hold		Swing		
Labour hold		Swing		

=== 2022 Hounslow London Borough Council election ===
Hounslow Central (3)
Party	Candidate	Votes	%	±%
Labour	Pritam Singh Grewal	1,217	59.7	
Labour	Ajmer Grewal	1,166	57.2	
Labour	Rasheed Bhatti	1,144	56.1	
Conservative	Hetal Kataria	618	30.3	
Conservative	Nimit Shishodia	573	28.1	
Conservative	Shumaila Ali	542	26.6	
Green	Katharine Hollingworth-kandelaki	384	18.8	
Turnout		2,039	31.0	
Labour hold		Swing		
Labour hold		Swing		
Labour hold		Swing		
