= Grade I and II* listed buildings in the London Borough of Hounslow =

There are over 9,000 Grade I listed buildings and 20,000 Grade II* listed buildings in England. This page is a list of these buildings in the London Borough of Hounslow.

== Grade I ==
Name	Location	Type	Completed (Note: The date given is the date used by Historic England as significant for the initial building or that of an important part in the structure's description.)	Date designated	Grid ref. (Note: The grid reference is based on the British national grid reference system, sometimes known as OSGB36, used by the Ordnance Survey.) Geo-coordinates	Entry number (Note: The "List Entry Number" is a unique number assigned to each listed building and scheduled monument by Historic England.)	Image
Osterley Park	Isleworth, Hounslow	Country House	c. 1577	21 May 1973	TQ1451177997; 51°29′22″N 0°21′07″W	1080308	Osterley Park More images
Osterley Park Stables	Isleworth, Hounslow	Courtyard	c. 1575	21 May 1973	TQ1449978104; 51°29′25″N 0°21′08″W	1358341	Osterley Park Stables More images
Osterley Park Aviary	Isleworth, Hounslow	Orangery	c. 1780	21 May 1973	TQ1443278153; 51°29′27″N 0°21′11″W	1080309	Osterley Park Aviary More images
Osterley Park Temple	Isleworth, Hounslow	Summerhouse	Early Georgian	21 May 1973	TQ1426678110; 51°29′25″N 0°21′20″W	1189780	Osterley Park Temple More images
Boston Manor House, Boston Manor Park	Hounslow	Manor House	Restored prior to opening	11 July 1951	TQ1683978339; 51°29′31″N 0°19′06″W	1079603	Boston Manor House, Boston Manor Park More images
Chiswick House	Burlington Lane, Chiswick	Villa	1730	21 May 1973	TQ2100877524; 51°29′01″N 0°15′31″W	1079607	Chiswick House More images
Cascade in Chiswick Park	Chiswick House Gardens	Cascade		21 May 1973	TQ2100177417; 51°28′58″N 0°15′32″W	1188850	Cascade in Chiswick Park More images
Classic Bridge in Chiswick Park	Chiswick House Gardens	Bridge	1788	21 May 1973	TQ2072777627; 51°29′05″N 0°15′46″W	1358665	Classic Bridge in Chiswick Park More images
Conservatory to Chiswick House	Chiswick House Gardens	Conservatory	1813	21 May 1973	TQ2107277710; 51°29′07″N 0°15′28″W	1079611	Conservatory to Chiswick House More images
Deer House in Chiswick Park	Chiswick House Gardens	Deer House	Recently Restored	21 May 1973	TQ2097677678; 51°29′06″N 0°15′33″W	1079610	Deer House in Chiswick Park More images
Doric Column in Chiswick Park north-east of conservatory	Chiswick House Gardens	Column	18th century	21 May 1973	TQ2095177698; 51°29′07″N 0°15′34″W	1188858	Doric Column in Chiswick Park north-east of conservatory More images
Entrance Gateway of Chiswick Park west of the obelisk	Chiswick House Gardens	Gate	18th century	21 May 1973	TQ2082677344; 51°28′56″N 0°15′41″W	1358666	Entrance Gateway of Chiswick Park west of the obelisk More images
Inigo Jones's Gateway in Chiswick Park	Chiswick House Gardens	Gate	1621	21 May 1973	TQ2104877599; 51°29′04″N 0°15′29″W	1294560	Inigo Jones's Gateway in Chiswick Park More images
Ionic Temple and Obelisk in Chiswick Park	Chiswick House Gardens	Obelisk	18th century	21 May 1973	TQ2086277563; 51°29′03″N 0°15′39″W	1188839	Ionic Temple and Obelisk in Chiswick Park More images
Obelisk in Chiswick Park at end of avenue running west from temple	Chiswick House Gardens	Obelisk	18th century	21 May 1973	TQ2083077367; 51°28′56″N 0°15′41″W	1079608	Obelisk in Chiswick Park at end of avenue running west from temple More images
Ornaments lining avenue to rear of Chiswick House	Chiswick House Gardens	Bust		21 May 1973	TQ2098477565; 51°29′03″N 0°15′32″W	1188978	Ornaments lining avenue to rear of Chiswick House More images
Stone Entrance Piers in front of Chiswick House	Chiswick House Gardens	Gate Pier		21 May 1973	TQ2105277491; 51°29′00″N 0°15′29″W	1079569	Stone Entrance Piers in front of Chiswick House More images
Temple (rustic House) at end of yew walk north-east of Chiswick House	Chiswick House Gardens	Temple	18th century	21 May 1973	TQ2090377861; 51°29′12″N 0°15′36″W	1188898	Temple (rustic House) at end of yew walk north-east of Chiswick House More images
Ten Terms with female heads in semicircle in front of Chiswick House	Chiswick House Gardens	Bust		21 May 1973	TQ2103877488; 51°29′00″N 0°15′30″W	1358668	Ten Terms with female heads in semicircle in front of Chiswick House More images
Three Male Statues from Hadrian's Villa in Chiswick Park	Chiswick House Gardens	Statue		21 May 1973	TQ2090877613; 51°29′04″N 0°15′36″W	1079568	Three Male Statues from Hadrian's Villa in Chiswick Park More images
Two Statues flanking Chiswick House	Chiswick House Gardens	Statue	c. 1730	21 May 1973	TQ2101077500; 51°29′01″N 0°15′31″W	1079612	Two Statues flanking Chiswick House More images
Syon House	Isleworth, Hounslow	Country house	1430–70	15 June 1951	TQ1728276685; 51°28′37″N 0°18′45″W	1080318	Syon House More images
Syon House Conservatory	Isleworth, Hounslow	Conservatory	c. 1830	15 June 1951	TQ1727376861; 51°28′43″N 0°18′46″W	1358328	Syon House Conservatory More images
Syon Park Boathouse	Isleworth, Hounslow	Pavilion	Late 18th century	15 June 1951	TQ1691176107; 51°28′19″N 0°19′05″W	1080282	Syon Park Boathouse More images
Syon Park London Road Lodges and gates	Isleworth, Hounslow	Gate		15 June 1951	TQ1684176999; 51°28′48″N 0°19′08″W	1190136	Syon Park London Road Lodges and gates More images
Syon Park Flora's Column	Isleworth, Hounslow	Column	Late 18th century	21 May 1973	TQ1756077086; 51°28′50″N 0°18′30″W	1080321	Syon Park Flora's Column More images
Syon House Lodge	Isleworth, Hounslow	Lodge	Early 17th century	15 June 1951		1358308	Syon House Lodge More images
Hogarth's House, wall and gate	Hogarth Lane (A4) Chiswick	Studio House	18th century	11 July 1951	TQ2125077891; 51°29′13″N 0°15′18″W	1358340	Hogarth's House, wall and gate More images
Great Engine House, Kew Bridge Pumping House	Brentford, Hounslow	Engine House	1845-6	21 May 1973	TQ1877978029; 51°29′19″N 0°17′26″W	1080311	Great Engine House, Kew Bridge Pumping House More images
Main Building, Kew Bridge Pumping Station	Brentford, Hounslow	Engine House	1836-8	21 May 1973	TQ1877478059; 51°29′20″N 0°17′26″W	1358343	Main Building, Kew Bridge Pumping Station More images
Kew Bridge Pumping Station Tower	Brentford, Hounslow	Water Tower	1867	21 May 1973	TQ1881478028; 51°29′19″N 0°17′24″W	1080310	Kew Bridge Pumping Station Tower More images
Walpole House	Chiswick Mall	House	Late 17th century	11 July 1951	TQ2186478061; 51°29′18″N 0°14′46″W	1358321	Walpole House More images

== Grade II* ==
Name	Location	Type	Completed	Date designated	Grid ref. Geo-coordinates	Entry number	Image
Bedford House and Eynham House	Chiswick Mall, Chiswick	House	Early 18th century	11 July 1951	TQ2164477846; 51°29′11″N 0°14′58″W	1358322	Bedford House and Eynham House More images
Church of All Saints	Church Street, Isleworth	Church	15th century	15 June 1951	TQ1680176083; 51°28′18″N 0°19′11″W	1358287	Church of All Saints More images
Church of St Dunstan	St Dunstan's Rd, Feltham, Middlesex TW13 4JY	Church	1802	14 August 1953	TQ0986972260; 51°26′19″N 0°25′14″W	1261097	Church of St Dunstan More images
Church of St George	Castle Way, Hanworth Park, Middlesex, TW13 7NL	Church	Remodelled 1865	14 August 1953	TQ1125071880; 51°26′06″N 0°24′03″W	1189077	Church of St George More images
Church of St Lawrence	High Street, Brentford	Tower	15th century	11 July 1951	TQ1743577289; 51°28′57″N 0°18′37″W	1080302	Church of St Lawrence More images
St Leonard's Church	Heston Rd, Heston, Hounslow, Middlesex, TW5 0RD	Tower	15th century	15 June 1951	TQ1313277498; 51°29′06″N 0°22′19″W	1080340	St Leonard's Church More images
Church of St Michael and All Angels	Bath Road, Bedford Park, Chiswick W4	Church	1887	11 July 1951	TQ2124578906; 51°29′46″N 0°15′17″W	1079622	Church of St Michael and All Angels More images
Church of St Nicholas and Attached Walls	Church Street, Chiswick W4	Wall	1623	11 July 1951	TQ2156977784; 51°29′09″N 0°15′02″W	1189405	Church of St Nicholas and Attached Walls More images
Garvin House	Twickenham Road, Isleworth, Hounslow	House	c. 1700	15 June 1951	TQ1614775588; 51°28′02″N 0°19′45″W	1261018	Garvin House More images
Gates and Screen to Walpole House	Chiswick Mall, W4	Gate		21 May 1973	TQ2187278053; 51°29′18″N 0°14′46″W	1080341	Gates and Screen to Walpole House
Gumley House (convent)	Isleworth, Hounslow	Detached House	c. 1700	15 June 1951	TQ1616075829; 51°28′10″N 0°19′45″W	1261056	Gumley House (convent) More images
Gunnersbury Park	Hounslow	Country House	1801–28	21 May 1973	TQ1904079238; 51°29′58″N 0°17′11″W	1358312	Gunnersbury Park More images
Temple in Gunnersbury Park	Hounslow	Statue	Before 1760	11 July 1951	TQ1890279322; 51°30′01″N 0°17′18″W	1080331	Temple in Gunnersbury Park More images
Conservatory in Gunnersbury Park	Hounslow	Conservatory	Early 19th century	21 May 1973	TQ1907879120; 51°29′55″N 0°17′09″W	1294227	Conservatory in Gunnersbury Park More images
East Stables in Gunnersbury Park	Hounslow	Stable	Mid 19th century	21 May 1973	TQ1928479110; 51°29′54″N 0°16′59″W	1358316	East Stables in Gunnersbury Park
Kempton Park Pumping Station (including Triple Expansion House and Two Attached Chimneys)	Hounslow	Boiler House	1929	21 March 1995	TQ1101270854; 51°25′33″N 0°24′17″W	1260598	Kempton Park Pumping Station (including Triple Expansion House and Two Attached Chimneys) More images
Lilleshall Engine House, Kempton Park Pumping Station	Hounslow	Engine House	1902–1905	9 July 1998	TQ1107770829; 51°25′32″N 0°24′14″W	1375631	Lilleshall Engine House, Kempton Park Pumping Station More images
Gates to Syon Lodge, Syon Lodge	Isleworth, Hounslow	Gate and House	Late 18th century	15 June 1951	TQ1666976888; 51°28′44″N 0°19′17″W	1190017	Upload Photo
60 High Street	Old Brentford, Hounslow	House	Early 18th century	15 September 1987	TQ1796277531; 51°29′04″N 0°18′09″W	1260833	60 High Street
24 The Butts	Brentford, Hounslow	House	Early 18th century	11 July 1951	TQ1752477528; 51°29′04″N 0°18′32″W	1358685	24 The Butts
Quaker Meeting House	Quakers Lane, Isleworth, Hounslow	Friends Meeting House	1785	21 May 1973	TQ1634976881; 51°28′44″N 0°19′33″W	1240256	Quaker Meeting House More images
Roman Bridge at Osterley Park	Osterley, Hounslow	Bridge	Late 18th century	21 May 1973	TQ1481478957; 51°29′52″N 0°20′51″W	1079401	Roman Bridge at Osterley Park More images
Strawberry House	Chiswick Mall, Chiswick	House	Early 18th century	11 July 1951	TQ2188078069; 51°29′18″N 0°14′45″W	1294347	Strawberry House More images
The London Apprentice Public House	Isleworth, Hounslow	Public House	Early 18th century	15 June 1951	TQ1672376021; 51°28′16″N 0°19′15″W	1189443	The London Apprentice Public House More images
The Tabard Hotel	2 Bath Road, Bedford Park, Chiswick	Row	1880	11 July 1951	TQ2126078862; 51°29′45″N 0°15′17″W	1079594	The Tabard Hotel More images
Tombstone to Sir Percy Harris, 1st Baronet, St Nicholas Churchyard	Church Street, Chiswick	Sculpture	Carved late 1920s	28 February 2003	TQ2140577697; 51°29′07″N 0°15′11″W	1096142	Tombstone to Sir Percy Harris, 1st Baronet, St Nicholas Churchyard More images
Voysey House	Barley Mow Passage, Chiswick W4	Apartment	1987	21 May 1973	TQ2075378440; 51°29′31″N 0°15′43″W	1294655	Voysey House More images
Ye Fox and Hounds and Mawson Arms	112–118 Mawson Row, 110 Chiswick Lane South, Chiswick	House	c. 1760	11 July 1951	TQ2162178017; 51°29′17″N 0°14′59″W	1358692	Ye Fox and Hounds and Mawson Arms More images
Zoffany House	65 Strand on the Green, W4	Studio House	1970-1810	11 July 1951	TQ1936277808; 51°29′12″N 0°16′56″W	1067523	Zoffany House More images
