= Brentford & Isleworth Meeting House =

Meeting house in London, England

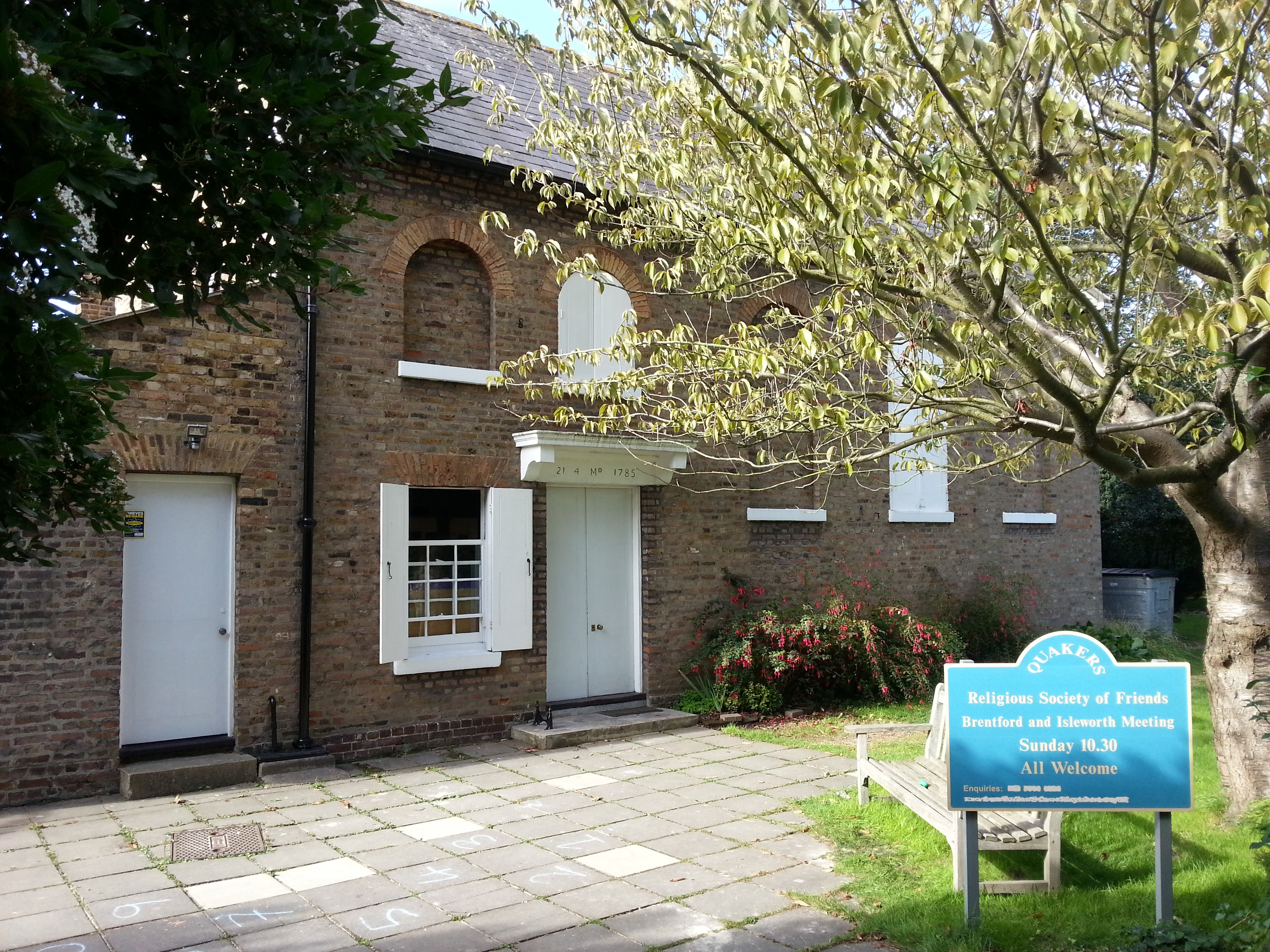
- The building in 2014

- Location within Greater London

General information
- Type: Friends meeting house
- Location: Quakers Lane, Isleworth, London, England
- Coordinates: 51°28′44″N 0°19′34″W
- Year built: 1785
- Renovated: Early 19th century (altered); 1958 and 1982 (added)

Renovating team
- Architect: Hubert Lidbetter (1958)

Website
- bandiquakers.org.uk

Listed Building – Grade II*
- Official name: Brentford and Isleworth Quaker Meeting House
- Designated: 21 May 1973
- Reference no.: 1240256

The Brentford & Isleworth Meeting House is a Friends meeting house (a Quaker place of worship) on Quakers Lane (Note: The building's official listing gives its address as London Road, but its address is on Quakers Lane.) in Isleworth, a suburban town in the London Borough of Hounslow, west London, England. Built in the 18th century, it is listed at Grade II* on the National Heritage List for England and is one of the oldest purpose-built meeting houses in London. Meeting for worship is held on Sundays at 10:30 am.

The building was constructed for the Quakers in 1785 and has been extended on several occasions, including the addition of a library in 1829 and a classroom in 1958. The land was purchased for £35 from Benjamin Angell, a retired printer and dyer and local Quaker. The West London Quaker burial ground and a garden surround the meeting house. The front wall was badly damaged during the London Blitz on 13 October 1940, and the building did not fully re-open until 1950; in the interim, meetings were held in a temporary space nearby. Local Quakers and conscientious objectors also used the site to operate an organisation providing relief to those affected by the bombing, known as the Relief Service Unit.
