= Isleworth =

Suburb of West London

Coordinates: 51.466°N 0.336°W

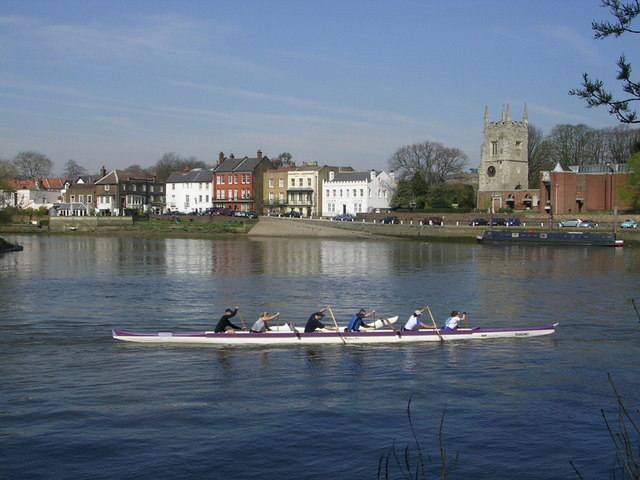
- Church Street in Isleworth, seen from across the River Thames

- Location within Greater London
- Area: 8.31 km^{2} (3.21 sq mi)
- Population: 25,008 (Isleworth, Osterley and Spring Grove wards 2011)
  - Density: 3,009/km^{2} (7,790/sq mi)
- OS grid reference: TQ1575
- Civil parish: n/a
- London borough: Hounslow
- Ceremonial county: Greater London
- Region: London
- Country: England
- Sovereign state: United Kingdom
- Post town: ISLEWORTH
- Postcode district: TW7
- Dialling code: 020
- Police: Metropolitan
- Fire: London
- Ambulance: London
- UK Parliament: Brentford and Isleworth; Twickenham; Ealing Southall
- London Assembly: South West

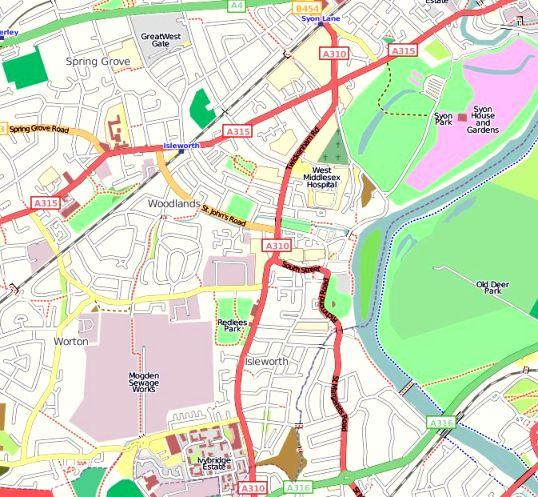
Map of the town of Isleworth (click to enlarge)

Isleworth (/ˈaɪzəlwəθ/ EYE-zəl-wəth) is a suburban town in the London Borough of Hounslow, west London, England. Its main retail street London Road becomes Hounslow High Street and adjoining Treaty Centre for shopping centre only a few hundred metres away from its westernmost point. No physical signs mark this boundary, which reflects how Isleworth contained the east of Hounslow, originally.

Isleworth sits west of the River Thames and its tributary the River Crane and the original area of settlement, alongside the Thames, is known as Old Isleworth. The northwest corner of the town, bordering on Osterley to the north and Lampton to the west, is known as Spring Grove. Both postally and historically Osterley is part of Isleworth, however it has its own tube station.

Isleworth's former Thames frontage of approximately one mile, excluding that of the upmarket attractions of Syon Park, was reduced to little over half a mile in 1994 when a borough boundary realignment was effected in order to unite the district of St Margaret's wholly within London Borough of Richmond upon Thames. As a result, the riverside is those parts overlooking the 8.6-acre (3.5 ha) islet of Isleworth Ait: the short-length River Crane flows into the Thames south of the Isleworth Ait, and its artificial distributary the Duke of Northumberland's River west of the Isleworth Ait, one of two Colne distributaries constructed for aesthetic reasons between 1600 and 1750.

The town is the birthplace of broadcaster David Attenborough.

== Etymology ==
Date	Form	Source
695	Gislheresuuyrth	An Anglo-Saxon charter.
1086	Gistelesworde	The Domesday Survey
1301	Istelworth	Roll.
1415	Ystelworth	Roll.
1418	Thistelworth	Plea Roll of the Court of Common Pleas
	Yhistelforth	George James Aungier, in "History of Syon Monastery, the Parish of Isleworth and the Chapelry of Hounslow", 1840
	Islleworth	George James Aungier, in "History of Syon Monastery, the Parish of Isleworth and the Chapelry of Hounslow", 1840
1540	Istyllworth	Local document
	Istelworthe	An assize (court sitting) document in the reign of Elizabeth I
1554	Thyslyworth	Plea Roll, Court of Common Pleas.
1593	Thistleworth or Gistelesworth	Norden and Lysons, historians
1702	Istleworth	Shown on a memorial in the parish church.
1742	Isleworth	Title of an engraving by Thomas Priest.

== History ==
=== Roman and Anglo Saxon ===
Excavations around the eastern end of the Syon Park estate have unearthed evidence of a Romano-British settlement. 'Gislheresuuyrth', meaning in Old English Enclosure belonging to [a man called] Gīslhere, is first referred to as a permanent settlement in an Anglo-Saxon charter in the year 695. The Domesday Book says that during the reign (1042–1066) of Edward the Confessor the manor belonged to "Earl Algar" (probably Ælfgar of Mercia), and a modern road off South Street today carries his name.

=== Granted to Saint Valeri Barons ===
Isleworth was a well-cultivated farming and trading settlement, more valuable than many of its neighbours at the time of the Norman Conquest in 1066. For centuries it continued to stretch from the Middlesex bank of the Thames in the east, west to include the centre of what was its hamlet then chapelry Hounslow (including the medieval founded Hounslow Priory) and to bound Whitton, as far north so as to bound Southall (in Hayes parish at the time), and as south as to bound Twickenham. The Domesday Book (1086) as Gistelesworde records its 55 ploughlands, 118 households and amount rendered, £72 per year, to its feudal system overlords. After the Conquest, successive Norman barons of the Saint Valeri family held the manor of Isleworth but there is no evidence that they lived there – it being held as a source of rentals and subinfeudation/lettings/charitable giving power. One of the later barons gave several manorial rents and privileges to London's Hospital of Saint Giles. He also gave the church and advowson to the Abbey of Saint Valeri, at the mouth of the Somme in Picardy.

=== Transfer to Earldom of Cornwall ===
Coat of arms of Richard, First Earl of Cornwall

In 1227, when he took control of England from his childhood regents, Henry III seized Isleworth manor and other property of the Saint Valeri family and gave the manor to his brother, Richard, 1st Earl of Cornwall. He built a new moated manor house, which is described in the Black Book of the Exchequer – having a tiled roof, chimney, two bedchambers and an inner courtyard. Outwith the moat was an outer courtyard with a number of buildings for servants and supplies, and a short distance away was a watermill. The exact location is unknown, but a report long ago of 'Moated Place' puts the likely place between the Northumberland Arms and Twickenham Road, with the watermill being near Railshead, on the only suitable water then existing, the Crane. The seemingly classic medieval manor house was burned down during the Second Barons' War in 1264.

=== Rectory, glebe and advowson (right to appoint the vicar) ===
The Abbey of Saint Valeri in Picardy held the livings (benefices) and revenues of several English parish church lands and, responding to growing disquiet over these foreign holdings, in 1391 it transferred those of Isleworth (for a fee) to William of Wykeham, who endowed them to Winchester College, which he founded. The Wardens and Scholars of Winchester College therefore became proprietors of productive rectory (which had glebelands). This lasted for 150 years, then in 1543 King Henry VIII exchanged with Winchester certain manors elsewhere for five churches in Middlesex, including All Saints.

Four years later he gave the Isleworth rectory and advowson to the Edward Seymour, 1st Duke of Somerset, but they returned to the crown when the Duke was executed in 1552. Soon after, they were given to the Dean and Canons of St George's Chapel, Windsor, with whom they remain today. The castle-like stone church tower by the river remains from this period, see below.

=== Transfer of Manor to Syon Monastery ===
In 1415 Henry V granted nuns from the Swedish Bridgettine order land on the bank of the Thames, firstly in Twickenham opposite his new Sheen Palace, where they built their first house Syon Monastery. In 1422 Henry V transferred ownership of Isleworth Manor from the Duchy of Cornwall to Syon Monastery, which in 1431 was selected for the new site within their manor to rebuild their monastery. This is the site of the present Syon House.

=== Granted to Duke of Somerset ===
Henry VIII demolished most of Syon Monastery after 1539 and the site and manor was granted to Edward Seymour, 1st Duke of Somerset. It was Seymour who built Syon House in 1548. Lady Jane Grey was taken from here to the Tower by Royal barge in anticipation of her being crowned Queen of England.

=== Acquired by Earl of Northumberland ===
Forty-six years later, in 1594 Queen Elizabeth I granted a lease of the manor of Syon to Henry Percy, 9th Earl of Northumberland on his marriage to Dorothy Devereux the younger daughter of Walter Devereux, 1st Earl of Essex, who later received a grant of the freehold from King James I in 1604. It has remained in the possession of the Percy family, now the Dukedom of Northumberland, for over four hundred years. The Royalist army occupied the house during the Battle of Brentford in November 1642. Syon Park was rebuilt and landscaped by the Adam brothers and "Capability" Brown between 1766 and 1773. It became the new home of the Dukes of Northumberland when Northumberland House in the Strand was demolished in 1874.

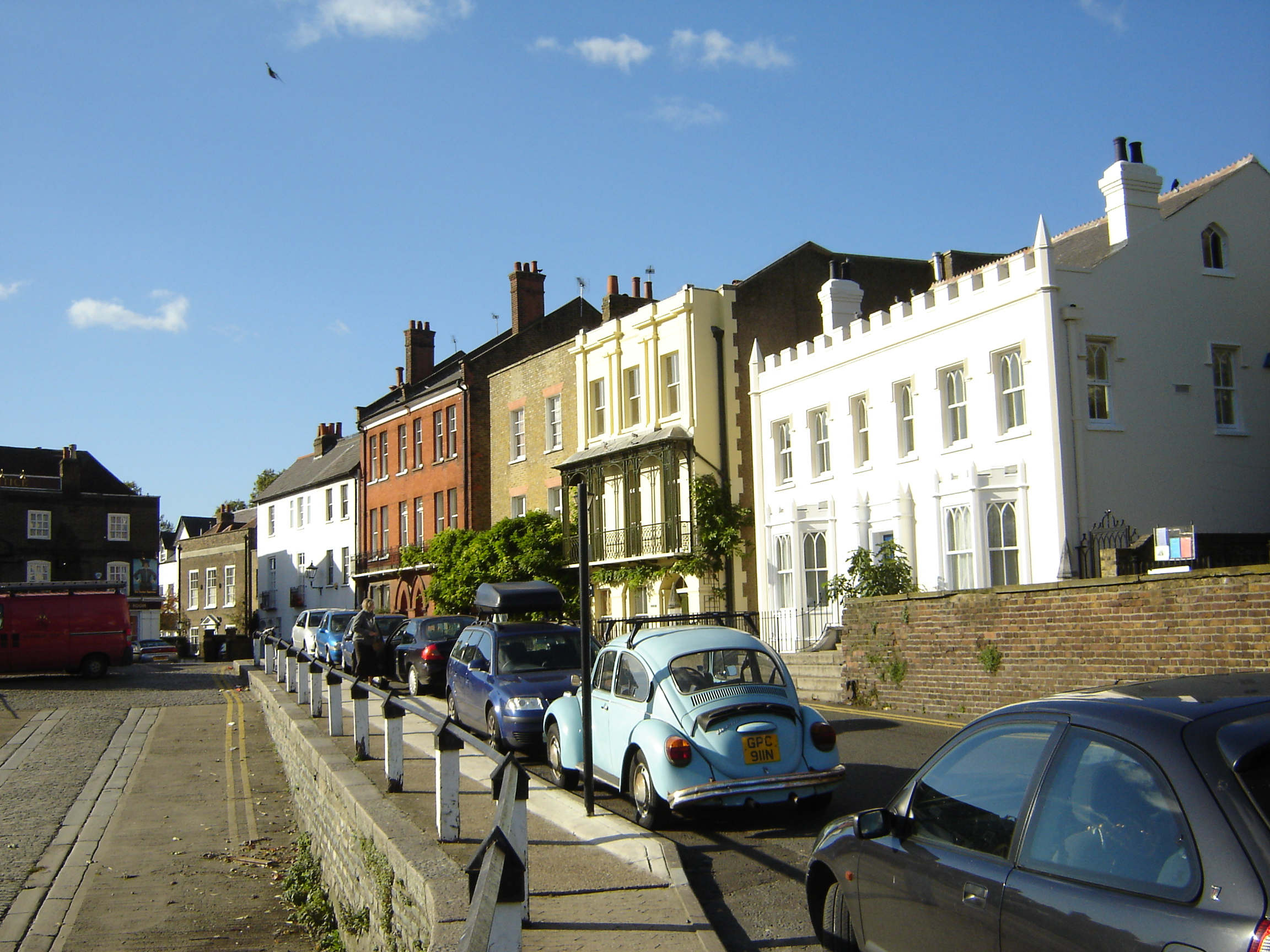
Georgian houses in Church Street, next to the parish church and facing the Thames

=== Georgian and Victorian times ===
Much of Isleworth became orchards in the 18th century (including part of Hugh Ronalds' renowned nursery), and then market gardens in the 19th century, supplying the London markets. Lower Square and Church Street still have buildings dating from the 18th and early 19th centuries. A striking element of this period was the establishment in Isleworth of many mansions and large houses, principally for aristocrats and high achievers. This phenomenon arose owing mainly to the collection of royal and noble residences and ecclesiastical establishments that already existed nearby. The subject is examined in depth in the "Notable houses" section.

There is evidence of a Black community in Isleworth in the 18th century. This community was primarily made up of enslaved people of colour, from Africa, Asia or the Caribbean. Some of these people had fled from bondage and chose to seek their freedom in the streets of London. With very few exceptions, little is known about people of colour in 18th century London. However, as a result of contemporary sources like advertisements seeking the capture and return of runaway slaves, an insight can be gained into the lives of two people, Marina Dellap and Prince, who resided in the area in 1765.

=== Workhouse and former Hospitals ===
Brentford Workhouse Infirmary and West Middlesex Hospital before 1980

The Brentford Poor Law Union had a workhouse built in 1838 covering much land to the east of Twickenham Road in Isleworth. At the turn of the 20th century, this was totally rebuilt as an infirmary, with a much larger workhouse newly erected in the grounds. This infirmary functioned until 1920, when it became 'West Middlesex Hospital'. In 1931 it was upgraded to a county hospital, but in 1948 (under the NHS) 'County' was dropped from its title. It later became a teaching hospital, and added 'University' to its title in 1980. The Victorian buildings were closed in 2003, and largely redeveloped as housing, called Union Lane, after the original workhouse. The hospital was rebuilt on the adjacent site.

Percy House Auxiliary Military Hospital

Within the old union workhouse complex stood a school, facing Twickenham Road, called Percy House – Percy being the surname of the dukes of Northumberland. Owing to its gradual disuse as a school it was adapted to function as a military hospital during World War I of 1914–18. From 1915 onwards it treated some 5,000 war-wounded soldiers, and ceased operation at the end of 1918. Among the VAD nurses was Sophia Duleep Singh. The building was demolished in 1978.

Mogden Isolation / South Middlesex Fever Hospital

An isolation hospital existed on the south side of Mogden Lane, which runs west from Twickenham Road. Opened in 1897, Mogden Isolation Hospital was renamed 'South Middlesex Fever Hospital' in 1938 but continued under local authority control. When the National Health Service was formed it became, in 1948, simply South Middlesex Hospital. It closed in 1991.

=== 20th century ===
The first half of the 20th century for Isleworth generally was characterised by a very substantial amount of artisan and white-collar residential development throughout the town, on many market gardens. The former western area was ceded to the town and parish of Hounslow. On 1 April 1927 the parish of Isleworth was abolished and merged with Heston to form Heston and Isleworth. At the 1921 census (the last before the abolition of the parish), Isleworth had a population of 29,908. This period also included the building of several new factories and offices, mostly in the far north-east by the eastern limit (with Brentford). This rapid spread of building transformed the nature of Isleworth's layout in the space of just fifty years, from an agrarian pattern to an urban one.

Isleworth's former Thames frontage of about one mile (excluding within the Syon estate), has fallen to about 0.5 miles (0.80 km) since 1994 when two boroughs' boundaries were tweaked by the UK's Local Government Minister to shift land to the London Borough of Richmond upon Thames. This unified the district of St Margarets, Twickenham, named after a former house there. The house stood in its Ailsa estate a Victorian garden suburb and which has a railway station next to its other parts and has several seamless bridges over the south channel of the Crane, but which accordingly had been cross-borough.

== Geography ==
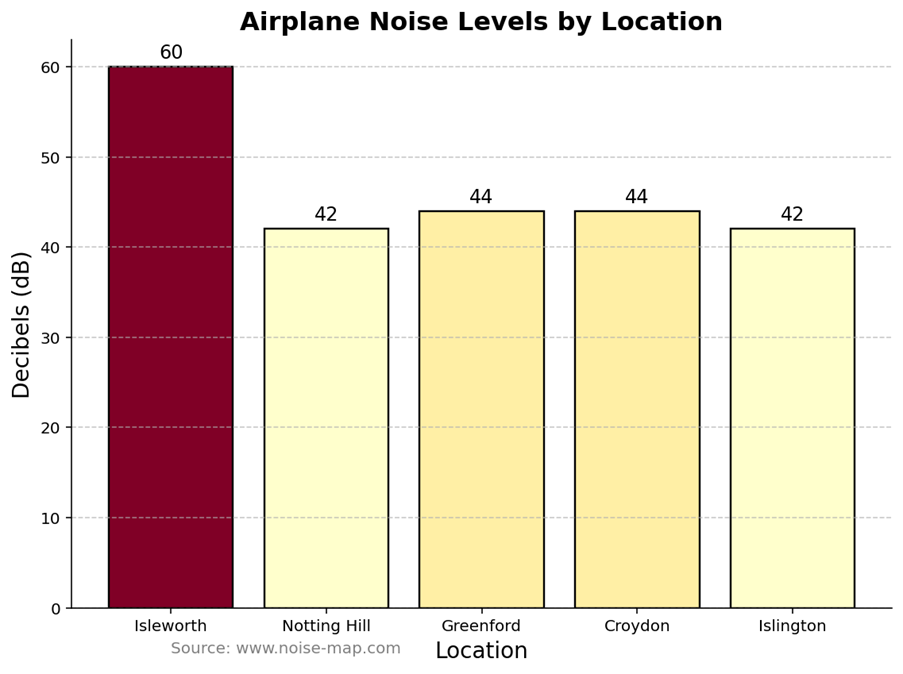
Noise

If deemed to still include Osterley, elevations range from 27 m (89 ft) in the northwest to 4.9 m (16 ft) by the Thames OD. The boundaries are longstanding, subject to twentieth-century western and southern circonscriptions: Isleworth is east of the town of Hounslow which has more retail and offices, in the borough of that name; west of the River Thames; north of its tributary and the northernmost confluence of the Crane; and south of the crest by the M4 motorway separating the Brent and Crane catchments. Half of the River Crane flows into the Thames south of the Ait, and its newest distributary the Duke of Northumberland's River flows toward the Ait's midpoint.

Isleworth is on the Heathrow flight path. It experiences a high level of airplane noise daily. Hundreds of flights per day go over Isleworth. Both flight paths 27R and 27L go through Isleworth. The average daily noise level at Isleworth station is 61 decibels.

== Politics ==
Isleworth is part of the Brentford and Isleworth constituency for elections to the House of Commons.

Isleworth resembles Isleworth ward for elections to its council, Hounslow London Borough Council.

== Amenities ==
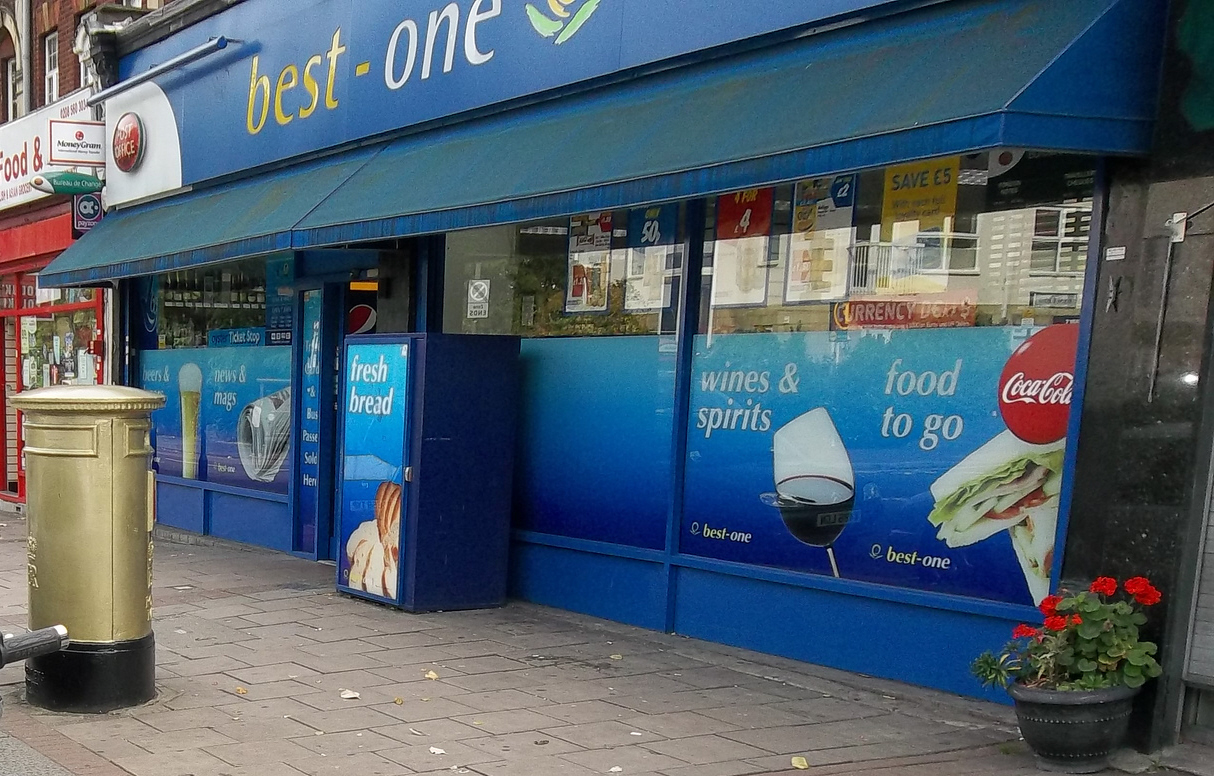
Olympic gold medal-winning distance runner Mo Farah's gold post box is outside a large convenience shop; his senior school was Isleworth and Syon School

Isleworth is home to Isleworth Crown Court whose original remit has been expanded to include judicial work formerly conducted at the Middlesex Crown Court; an extension to create six new courtrooms was completed in 2009.

The town's municipal facilities include a library, a leisure centre with swimming pool, a gymnasium, four recreation grounds, and a town (community) hall.

There used to be a film studio in Worton Road, Isleworth. Known variously as Worton Hall Studios and Isleworth Studios, its most notable film was The African Queen (1951) starring Humphrey Bogart and Katharine Hepburn. After it closed, the premises became a Mining Research Establishment for the National Coal Board. It is now a subdivided but in a larger set of light industry units.

Osterley/Isleworth has been home to satellite television broadcaster Sky since its launch in 1989 by Rupert Murdoch. Originally centred on Grant Way, the sprawling campus around Gillette Corner once took in New Horizons Court and is now the sole occupier of the Centaurs Business Park, with offices, studios, production space, research and development facilities, plus a dedicated energy centre including a wind turbine by Arup Associates.

The boat Cathja is moored in Old Isleworth. This is a 38-metre barge houses a charity since 1996. It offers people with mental disabilities an opportunity to hone their artistic skills, and hosts sculpture The Heron by Martin Cotts.

Isleworth was home to opera group Isleworth Baroque (now Richmond Opera) from 2002 to 2015.

== Hospitals ==
=== West Middlesex University Hospital ===
This is a major acute hospital on the Twickenham Road, Isleworth, with 394 beds, providing the full range of services expected of a general hospital. It serves residents of the London boroughs of Hounslow and Richmond. As a university hospital it is affiliated with Imperial College London. A programme of building, renovation and modernisation in recent years has resulted in the hospital offering modern facilities.

== Education ==
West Thames College, a further education college, is located in Isleworth.

=== Secondary schools ===
- The Green School for Girls
- Gumley House Convent School (girls)
- Isleworth and Syon School (boys)
- The Green School for Boys
- Oaklands School (Special Educational Needs)

=== Primary schools ===
- Ashton House School
- The Blue School (Church of England)
- Isleworth Town, a school that has been open for more than 100 years
- Ivybridge
- Marlborough
- Smallberry Green
- Spring Grove Primary
- St Mary's (Roman Catholic)
- Worple

== Churches ==
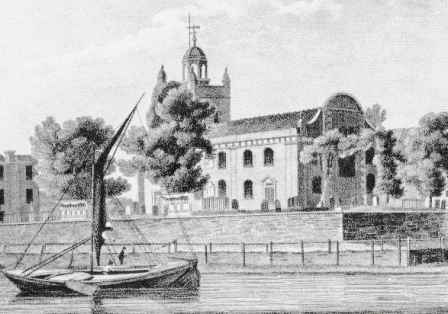
All Saints Church, early 19th century

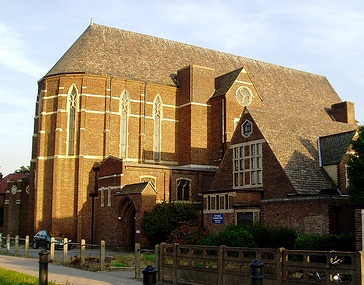
St Francis of Assisi parish church, Great West Road

Church of England

- All Saints' Church, Isleworth is the ancient parish church
- St Francis of Assisi Church, Syon Lane (sometimes viewed as part of Osterley)
- St John's Church (near Woodlands)
- St Mary the Virgin Church (near Woodlands)
- St Mary's Church, Osterley

Full Protestant

- Isleworth Congregational Church

Roman Catholic

- St Bridget's RC Church

== Transport ==
=== Roads ===
The principal road in Isleworth is the London Road (A 315), which closely tracks the later dubbed Devil's Highway (Roman Britain) rising here to gravelly heathland en route to Silchester, from where other roads led to Bath, Winchester and Salisbury; one historian Bate combines Latin with Anglo-Saxon to call this "Tamesis Street"; stressing how for instance it took until the year 1280 for a Maidenhead Bridge, whereas on this route, the first Staines Bridge was Roman – to cross the Thames.

In Westminster the road is 'Knightsbridge' and 'Piccadilly'. In Hammersmith it is 'King Street', in Chiswick: the 'High Road', in Brentford and Kensington: 'High Street', and as Isleworth's 'London Road' passes into Hounslow it again becomes 'High Street'. After this the road united with the road to Maidenhead bridge (now mirrored by a nearby motorway bridge since the 1960s) this was part of the 'King's Highway' to Windsor. That union of roads held axiomatic in the form of Hounslow High Street until the A30 as a bypass was built in 1925. The west London continued permittance (both by the former Borough and Middlesex County Council) of national road infrastructure is shown by the fact the M4 motorway exists here, since 1965, as a further bypass.

As mentioned, a bigger road was completed in 1925, named the Great West Road (A 4), moving in much the same direction, de facto the new northern boundary of Osterley which had lay partly in Heston, otherwise in Isleworth as it remains historically and postally. A six-lane dual carriageway for most of its length, with attendant cycle paths, it fulfilled the purpose of bypassing the bottlenecks of Brentford and Hounslow high streets to relieve the old road from London of traffic heading to and from Windsor and beyond. A later branch extension off this new road, named the Great South West Road, carried traffic south-westwards and this had the additional effect of relieving the London Road of traffic heading to and from Staines Bridge and beyond.

The other key through road is the Twickenham Road (A 310), which branches off London Road west of Syon Park and takes traffic to Twickenham, Teddington and beyond. This was the King's Highway to Hampton Court, so in years past those houses fronting on Twickenham Road, such as Somerset House and the two Silver Halls.

=== Bus and tram ===
Horse-drawn omnibus operation came to Isleworth in the mid-1800s. The predominant London bus operator from 1856 to 1933 was the London General Omnibus Company, after which the London Passenger Transport Board was formed. On 19 October 1856 the LGOC took over an existing omnibus operation between Isleworth and St Paul's Cathedral with the buses painted red.

Electric trams started running in Isleworth in 1901, from a depot situated on the north side of London Road, near the border with Hounslow. The original operating company was London United Tramways, which was subsumed into the new London Passenger Transport Board in 1933. In 1935 the depot was converted to trolleybus operation. It was designed in a horseshoe shape with a travelator at the far end, which had a turntable added for the trolleybuses. Originally known as Hounslow Depot, it was renamed Isleworth and given the code "IH" in 1950. It had a capacity for 37 vehicles and only ever operated one service: the 57 tram route which, on conversion, became the 657 trolleybus route. Both the 57 and 657 operated between Hounslow and Shepherd's Bush Green via Isleworth, Brentford, Chiswick, and Goldhawk Road. From 1902 the Hounslow terminus of the 57 tram was the "Hussar" in Staines Road, Hounslow Heath. In July 1922 the service was cut back to terminate at the "Bell" at the western end of Hounslow High Street. A special turning place half a mile along Staines Road, at its junction with Wellington Road, was built for the 657 trolleybus. At different times there were ambitious plans to extend the tram lines westward to Staines-upon-Thames and even to Maidenhead, but these never came about and the modern replacement motor bus route 237 traverses exactly the same roads between Hounslow Heath and Shepherd's Bush as the trams did over 110 years ago (with a short extension to White City).

When the 657 figured in the final London trolleybus conversion of all, on 8 May 1962, Isleworth Depot was closed and its staff were transferred to nearby Hounslow Bus Garage (coded "AV"). The replacement motor bus service was provided by an extension of route 117, which up to then had run between Egham and Hounslow. In 1978 the 117 between Hounslow and Shepherd's Bush was superseded by an eastward extension to route 237. Until this time the 237 had operated between Chertsey and Hounslow with single deck buses – a truly suburban route. As part of the privatisation of London bus services, Hounslow Garage passed to London United that later was purchased by Transdev and later over by the RATP Group.

Another trolleybus service serving Isleworth was the 667, formerly the 67 tram, which passed through en route from Hampton Court to Hammersmith via Hampton Hill, Fulwell, Twickenham, Busch Corner, Brentford and Chiswick. Upon its transfer to motor bus operation, as part of the final London trolleybus conversions, the route had its number changed from 667 to 267. Tram 67, trolleybus 667 and motor bus 267 were all operated from Fulwell bus garage. The history of the ownership of Fulwell (coded "FW") is exactly as for Hounslow Garage above.

On Summer Bank Holidays a special service was operated between Shepherd's Bush and Hampton Court. In tram days this was route 65, but trolleybuses showed number 667 towards Hampton Court and 657 on the return journey. This service did not survive the trolleybuses' withdrawal.

A long-established motor bus route serving Isleworth (and Hounslow) was the number 37. This was one of the earliest motor bus routes introduced by the London General Omnibus Company and it originally ran from Isleworth to Peckham via St Margarets, Richmond, Barnes, Putney, Wandsworth, Clapham Junction, Clapham Common, Brixton, Herne Hill and East Dulwich. It was later extended westward to Hounslow (going round the back streets to avoid the low railway bridge in St John's Road and to serve Isleworth railway station) and for a brief time in the 1920s offered a summer Sunday service extension as far as Maidenhead. Even without that short-lived extension the 37 was one of London's longest routes. Between 1922 and 1938 its western terminus was the "Hussar" at Hounslow Heath but was then cut back to turn at Hounslow Bus Garage (later Bus Station). At the beginning the terminus in Isleworth was the forecourt of the Northumberland Arms public house and the destination boards displayed "ISLEWORTH Market Place". Later, for "short" journeys, this was changed to stands in Magdala Road and then in South Street, outside the Public Hall. In 1991 this historic route was curtailed to run between Peckham and Putney, and the section between Richmond and Hounslow via Isleworth became a new, more localised service numbered H37.

=== Rail ===
Isleworth has two railway stations, one often considered on a north-east boundary. These are on a loop branch running off a main line operated by South Western Railway between central London and Reading. Heading "down", the loop begins at the Barnes junction, then travels through Chiswick and Brentford before entering Isleworth by crossing the River Brent just south of the A4 trunk road. Thereafter it serves the two stations of Syon Lane and Isleworth before leaving the town just north of the Woodlands estate and passing under Bridge Road. The service usually runs at fifteen-minute intervals. Following its next stop at Hounslow the loop, as to half of services re-enters the main line before Whitton station, as to the other half proceeds beyond Virginia Water via towns en route, to serve the Chertsey Branch/Loop culminating at Platform 1, Weybridge railway station where other platforms serve the South West Main Line.

Nearest National Rail stations

- Isleworth
- Syon Lane

Nearest London Underground stations

- Osterley Piccadilly Line
- Hounslow East Piccadilly Line
- Richmond District Line

=== River passenger services (history) ===
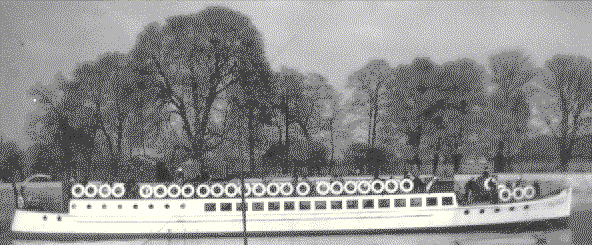
Typical pleasure boat of the mid-20th century seen from Isleworth Promenade in 1952

1840 George J Aungier: "There is a ferry, called Church Ferry, for foot passengers, from the church over the river to West Sheen, Kew, &c. and another at the southern extremity of the village, called Rails-head Ferry."

1947 Rails-head Ferry still existed, more than fifty years after the nearby footbridge had been built.

1952 Typical pleasure boat of the mid-20th century seen here from Isleworth Promenade.

== Notable residents ==
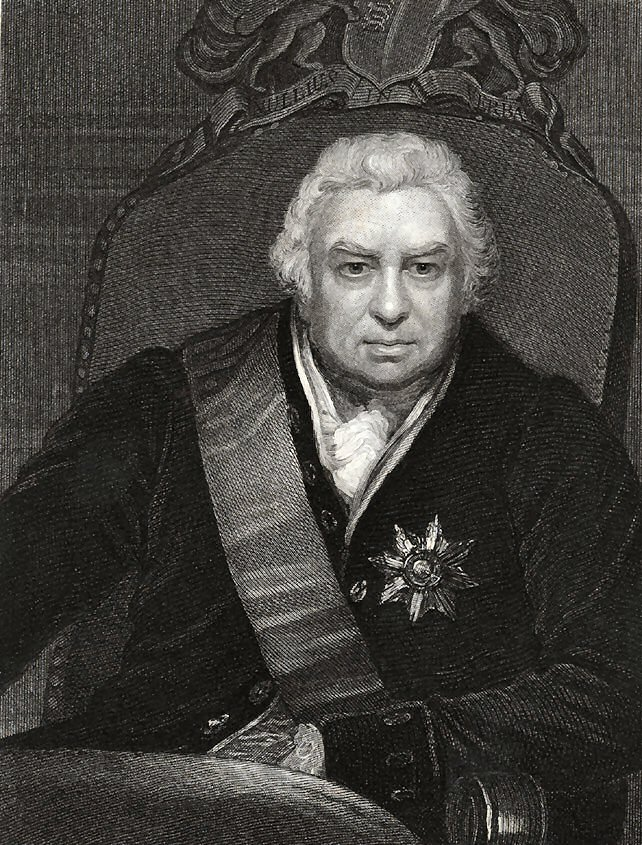
Sir Joseph Banks

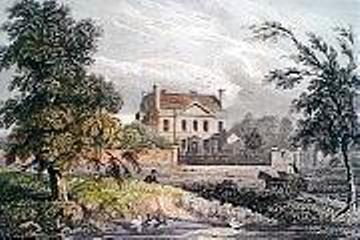
Banks' house, known as Spring Grove House

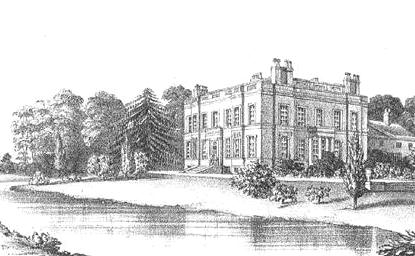
Spring Grove House in the 18th century

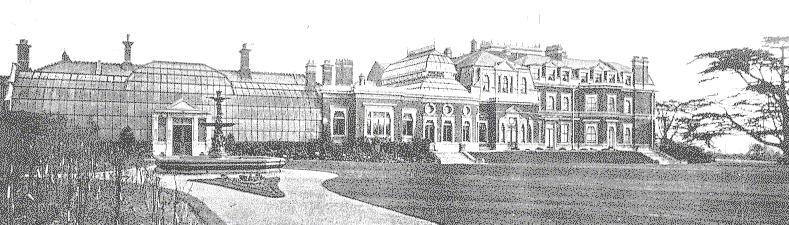
Spring Grove House in 1902

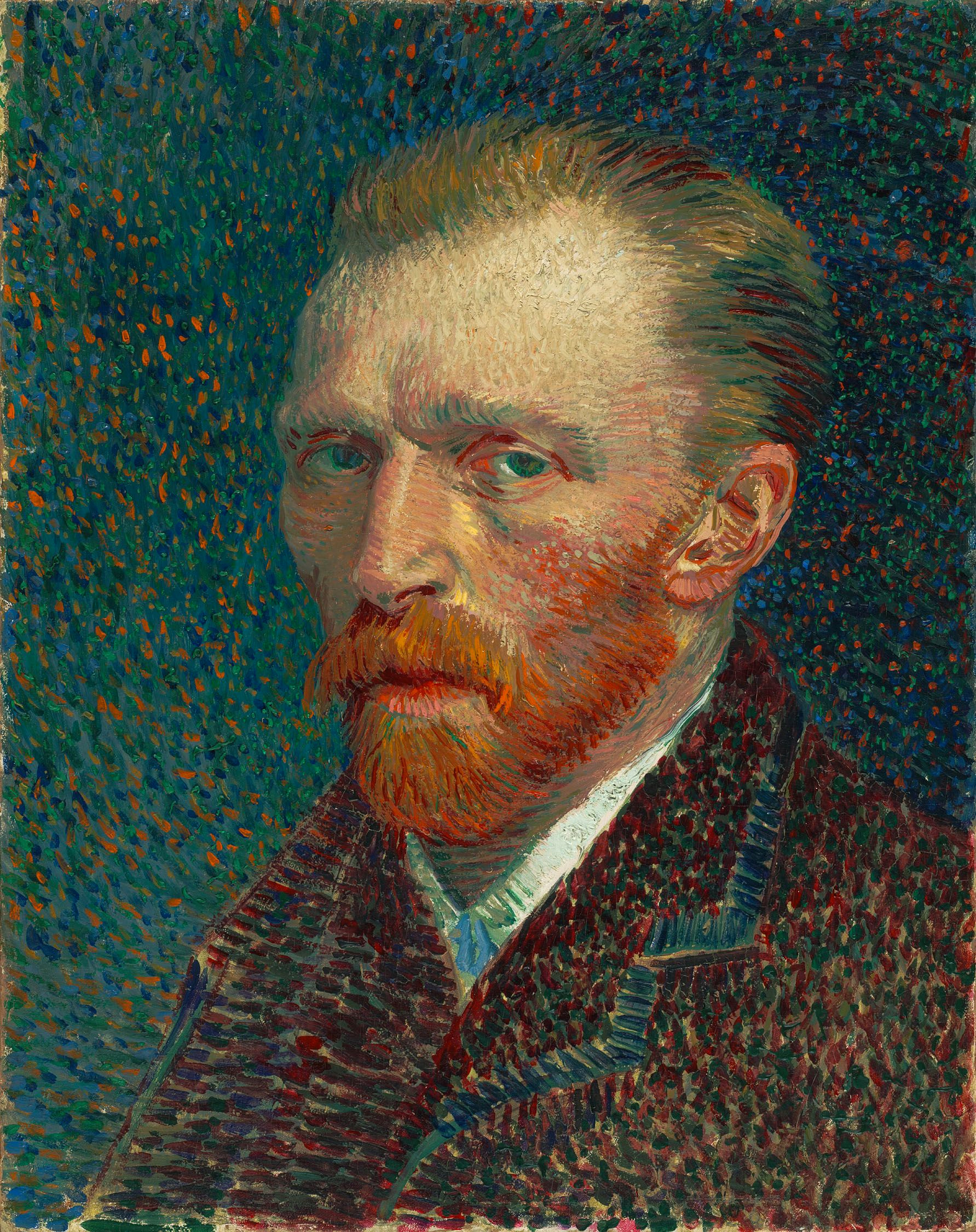
Vincent van Gogh Self-portrait (1887), painted ten years after his stay in Isleworth

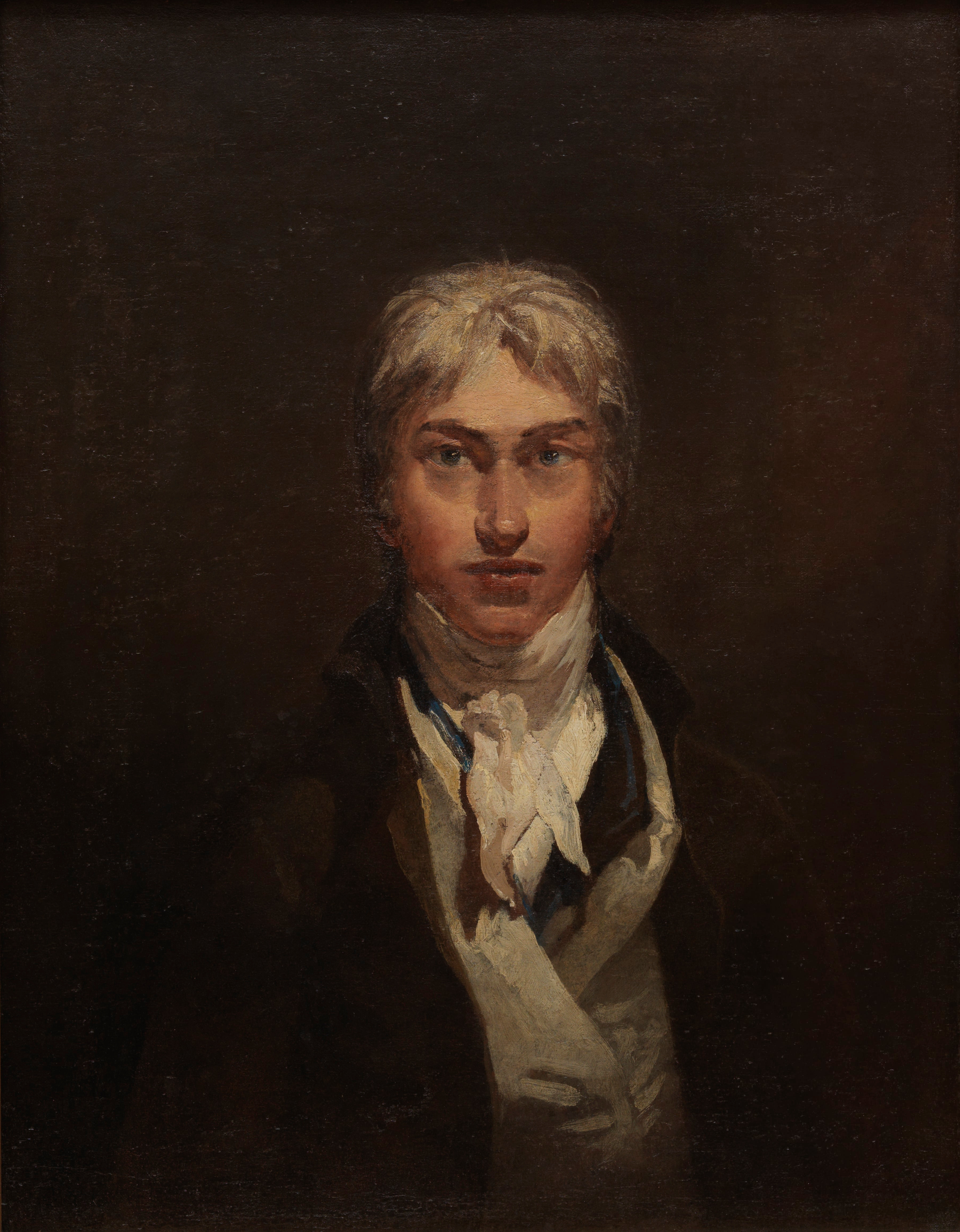
J. M. W. Turner
- Peter Oliver (1594–1648), watercolour copyist and miniature portrait artist, lived in his native Isleworth. He painted many figures at the courts of Kings James I and Charles I.
- Marina Dellap was a resident of Isleworth in 1765. She was enslaved and lived in the home of Mrs Dellap near All Saints’ Church in Isleworth. She ran away on 26 May 1765. Marina was in her 20s, had arrived from Jamaica about a year before, spoke English and had a child. She was a skilled seamstress. It is likely that Marina arrived in England with Elizabeth Bouffan after the death of her husband Alexander Dellap, with whom they lived in St Catherine, Jamaica.
- Prince was a resident of Isleworth in 1765. He was enslaved by a merchant called Mr Shea. Prince was aged 24, from Guinea and a musician who played the French horn. Prince ran away from Mr Shea on 13 August 1765 and is likely to have known Marina Dellap. She was seen with someone matching Prince’s description (wearing an old brown livery coat turned up with red).
- In 1779, Sir Joseph Banks, botanist, took a lease on, and eventually bought, a house with thirty-four acres (14 hectares) along the northern side of what is now London Road. It became known as "Spring Grove House". Although he also had a home in central London, he spent much time and effort on his Isleworth property. He steadily created a renowned botanical masterpiece on the estate, achieved primarily with many of the great variety of foreign plants he had collected on his great travels around the world, particularly with Captain Cook to Australia and the South Seas. Banks died in 1820, and over the next thirty years the house was considerably modified and enlarged by a new owner, Henry Pownall, who then sold the estate in 1850 for partial redevelopment.
- In 1804, J. M. W. Turner lived for a short time in Sion Ferry House in Isleworth, where he drew inspiration from the picturesque banks of the River Thames. His paintings thereafter include the Houses of Parliament and Hampton Court from the Thames.
- Ian Gilmour, who became 3rd Baronet of Craigmillar, was Secretary of State for Defence and Lord Privy Seal during the 1970s. He lived at the current Ferry House, on the same site as above, for fifty-three years until his death in 2007.
- Post-impressionist artist Vincent van Gogh moved to Isleworth in 1876 to become a teacher and assistant preacher at a local school. A blue plaque exists on the house he lived in alongside Twickenham Road.
- Andrew Pears was the third generation head of the Pears soap business located in Isleworth, and in 1886 he bought Spring Grove House. He rebuilt it in 1892/94 on a grander scale, retaining the structure, facing the building with new red brickwork, and adding large rear extensions. This created a sizeable mansion, most of which still stands. The house is now part of West Thames College. There is a memorial to the Pears family in Isleworth cemetery, including Thomas Pears (1882–1912) who died on the RMS Titanic.
- George Manville Fenn (1831-1909) was a prolific English novelist, journalist, editor and educationalist who lived in Isleworth and is buried there. Many of his novels were written for young adults.
- Walter R. Booth (1869–1938), creator of the first British animated cartoon film, The Hand of the Artist, constructed his own outdoor studio in the back garden of Neville Lodge, Woodlands Road, Isleworth in 1906 with Harold Bastick as his cameraman. At least fifteen films a year were made up to 1915, after which he entered the publicity film market, making advertising shorts for Cadbury.
- Arthur Penty (1875–1937), an architect and writer on guild socialism and distributism lived in Church Street, Old Isleworth (1926–1937). He is commemorated by a blue plaque.
- Eileen Sheridan (1923–2023), a champion English cyclist of the 1940s and 1950s, lived in Church Street, Old Isleworth for many years.
- Jack Simmons (1915–2000), historian, was born in Isleworth. In 1947 he became the first professor of history at University College, Leicester, which became the University of Leicester in 1957. He was the university's acting vice-chancellor from 1962 until 1975.
- Ronald Chetwynd-Hayes (1919–2001) was born in Isleworth. For over 30 years, Chetwynd-Hayes published more than 200 short stories, 8 novels, and over 20 collections, as well as editing 24 anthologies including many of the Fontana Ghost Stories series of anthologies.
- Sir David Attenborough (1926–) was born in Isleworth. His career as the face and voice of natural history television programmes has endured for more than 60 years. He is best known for writing and presenting the nine Life series, in conjunction with the BBC Natural History Unit.
- William Hartnell, actor, best known as the First Doctor in Doctor Who from 1963 to 1966, lived opposite the London Apprentice pub from the 1920s, next door to his guardian, the art collector Hugh Blaker.
- Vince Taylor (1939–1991), British rock and roll singer and main inspiration for David Bowie's Ziggy Stardust persona, spent his early life in Isleworth.
- Ellen Edith Hannah Redknap (1906–1991), author, lived at Worton Way and wrote under the name of Erroll Collins. She was active during the 1940s, specialising in adventure and science fiction for boys.
- Presenter Fiona Phillips lives in Isleworth.
- Patsy Morris, victim of unsolved murder in 1980 and reportedly the childhood girlfriend of serial killer Levi Bellfield, also from Isleworth.
- Joan Bicknell, professor of psychiatry and human rights advocate for people with intellectual disabilities, was born here..
- Edd Gould (1988–2012) creator of Eddsworld, a popular YouTube channel.
- Earl Rhodes, former actor, lives in Isleworth.
- Dave Brock, founder of space rock group Hawkwind, was born in Isleworth.
- Ruel, Australian singer-songwriter, was born in Isleworth.
- Ben Turnbull, artist, was born in Isleworth.
- Ellie Beaven, actress, was born and grew up in Isleworth
- Thomas Allistone (1823–1896), a soldier in the 11th Hussars who took part in the Charge of the Light Brigade.
- José-Marie Griffiths, current chancellor of Dakota State University, was born in Isleworth.

=== Fictional residents ===
- In the 2001 feature film Gosford Park, Sir William McCordle had one of his factories in Isleworth and Robert Parks was raised in orphanage in Isleworth.
- In the ITV television series, Agatha Christie's Poirot, Isleworth is often mentioned as the home town of Chief Inspector Japp.

== Landmarks ==
=== Notable houses ===
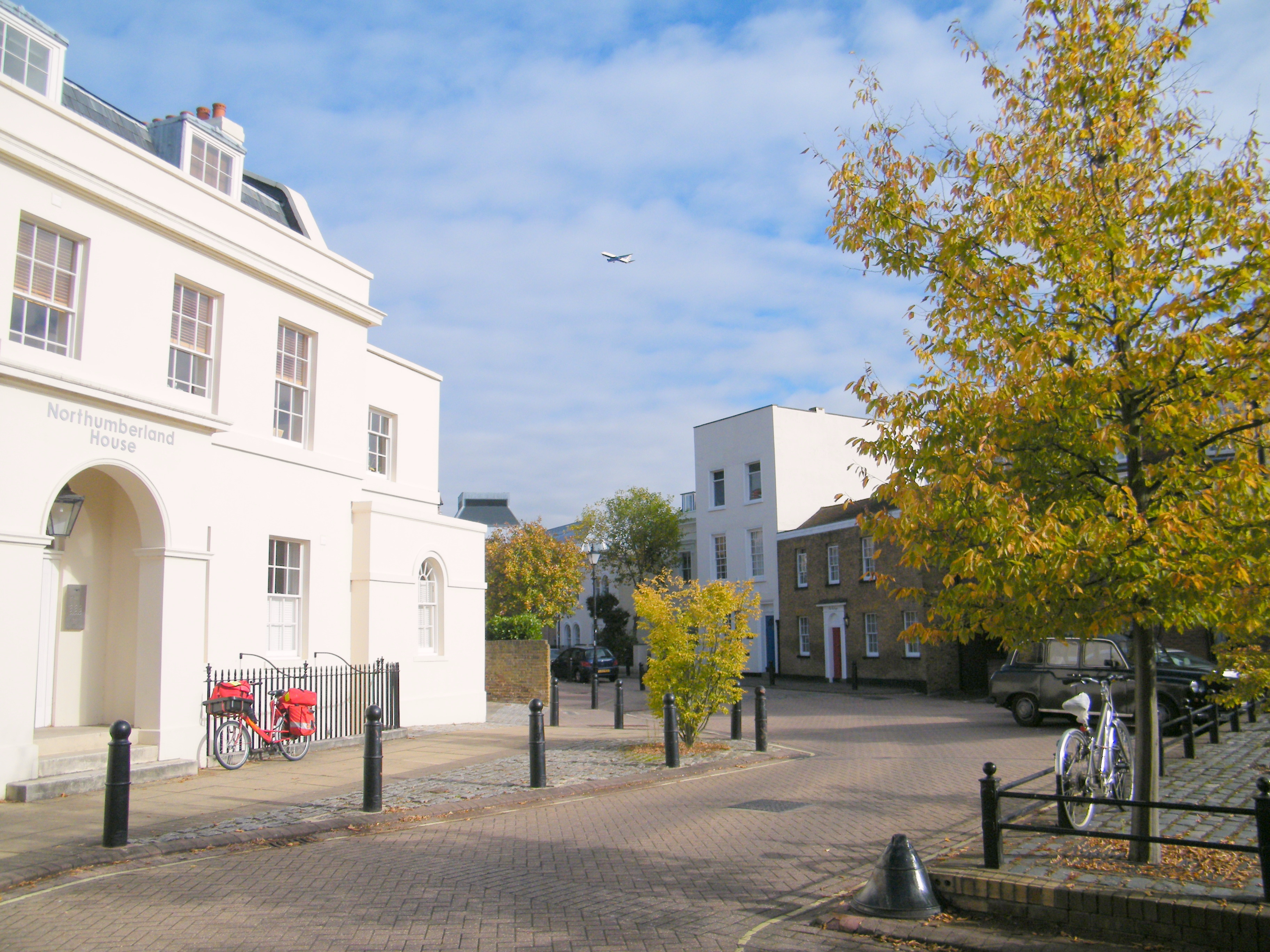
Northumberland House and others in Lower Square in one of Isleworth's conservation areas

Much building of grand houses occurred in the 18th and 19th centuries.

Three allures to the eastern half of Isleworth and Twickenham by 1740s were felt, plus Richmond Bridge opened in 1776 (and to wheeled traffic a year later):

1. The stretch of Thames with meadows, trees and broad water beauty figured in fine art, romantic verse by Alexander Pope.
2. Grand houses already existed, attracting those in their very high social circles (several in Chiswick, plus Osterley Park House, Syon Park House, Boston Manor House and one of Prime Minister Walpole's houses in Twickenham).
3. In the latter half of the Georgian era the royal court began to re-appear at Kew, so Kew and all adjacent parishes became, as under Elizabeth I, very fashionable for the rich and famous to build their grand homes.

Thanks to the 1840s mainstay of railway building, direct central London connections came, for the now royally deserted Richmond and Kew – prompting in most cases rebuilding or reinvestment in existing examples. Many high-quality houses also survived well The Blitz and need for wealthy or high income owners to afford their upkeep. Many thus have grade II* listing (the mid category) of architectural listed building.

- Syon House Duke of Somerset Duke of Northumberland. (standing, listed Grade I) With parts 450 years old, it has very grand architecture as the only non-royal ducal main home ('seat') in Middlesex. It is chronicled in an exhaustive history.

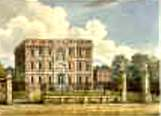
Silver Hall in 1800, on the King's Highway to Teddington

- Silver Hall No. 1 (South of North Street, with four acres) [1.6 hectares] for Sir John Smith Bt, of Isleworth, Privy to William & Mary for Lady Harcourt, widow of Sir William Harcourt, Chancellor (Demolished 1801)
- Silver Hall No. 2 (North of North Street) Joseph Dixon. (Demolished 1950)
- Kendal House. (Twickenham Road, near Mill Plat) Duchess of Kendal (mistress to George I).
- Somerset House/Cottage.
- Gunnersbury House. SE of where Bridge Road meets London Road (Demolished c. 1972).
- Isleworth House Sir William Cooper, chaplain to George III. Renamed Nazareth House in 1892 as a residential nursing home and convent, the remaining main half becoming The White House, Egerton Drive.
- Wyke House
- Little Syon (formerly Cromwell House) Sir Richard Wynn Bt. (Demolished 1818).

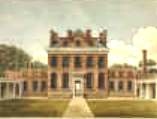
Gumley House in 1800

- Gumley House John Gumley (Commissary-General to the Army) The Earl of Bath (Gumley's son-in-law) General Lord Lake.
- Shrewsbury House George Talbot, 14th Earl of Shrewsbury

Shrewsbury House lay to the east of Upper Square, in the area known as Lion Wharf, once Beck's Wharf, also Shrewsbury Wharf. The 14th Earl inherited the lease in 1719 and later by Act of Parliament gained full rights to the property (in exchange for certain fee-farm rents) from an almshouse charity established by a former landlord, Sir Thomas Ingram, from whom the 1st Duke of Shrewsbury had originally leased the site. Around 1778 the 14th Earl started the process by which the house converted to a school for boys of Roman Catholic parents.

- Spring Grove House Sir Joseph Banks Andrew Pears. (standing, Grade II)

In 1862 Francis Pears decided to expand his soap making business and bought land alongside the London Road for a factory. Another, larger, factory was opened along the opposite side of the road in the 1880s and soap was made on the site until 1962. His son Andrew bought the Spring Grove House estate in 1886 and greatly extended the house in 1894. Pictures are shown under 'Notable residents'.

- Keppel House First Lord of the Admiralty Augustus Keppel.
- Lacy House A 17th-century house rebuilt in 1750 for James Lacy, of Drury Lane Theatre.
  Lacy's son inherited the property but his extravagance compelled him to sell the house, to the Hon. Sir Edward Walpole K.B. He bequeathed it to his daughter, widow of Bishop of Exeter, and after that it was acquired by the Earl of Warwick. After him came the famous playwright Richard Sheridan, who by then had already produced his two masterpieces School for Scandal and The Rivals. Lacy House was demolished in the 1830s.
- Warkworth House (demolished), north of Manor Mill (demolished)
- Busch House (demolished) see The Green School for Boys under its neighbouring sister school until opened.

==== Since 1993 in St Margarets, London ====
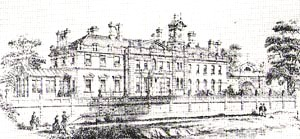
Gordon House at Railshead 1869

- Countess of Charleville's Villa Harriet Charlotte Beaujolais (Campbell) (about where Charleville Mews is by the Thames)
- Gordon House, by the Thames with a drive known as Railshead Road (standing, listed Grade II*). General Humphrey Bland Lord James Hay Lord John Kennedy-Erskine. Lord and Lady Frederick Gordon Earl of Kilmorey Judge T C Haliburton MP. In Lord Hay's time this was named 'Seaton House', after his ancestral home in Aberdeenshire. It was next bought by King William IV at 8,000 guineas for his (illegitimate) daughter Lady Augusta, who married Lord John Kennedy-Erskine of Dun, the son of the First Marquis of Ailsa who lived next door in St Margaret's House. Gordon House is being renovated.
- St Margaret's House (Lacy House rebuilt and renamed) 1st Marquis of Ailsa, Earl of Cassilis. Kilmorey House since 1853). Built for 2nd Earl of Kilmorey but he never lived there. Became the Royal Naval School for Girls (1856–1940). (Demolished 1950).
- Cassilis House
- St Margaret's Lodge

== Demography and housing ==
In the 2011 Census, the Isleworth ward of Hounslow was recorded as being 51% White British. Other significant ethnic groups were Other Whites (11.7%), Black Africans (7%), Indians (6.4%), and Other Asians (5.6%). The proportion who ethnically identify as BAME (Black, Asian and minority Ethnic) was 34.8% of the population.

63.3% of people living in Isleworth were born in England. The other most common countries of birth were India (7.6%), Somalia (5.2%), Ireland (1.7%) and Pakistan (1.4%).

The largest religious affiliations in Isleworth are Christians (49.5%), those with no religion (20.7%), Muslims (13.9%), Hindus (3.7%) and Sikhs (2.4%).

2011 Census Homes
Ward	Detached	Semi-detached	Terraced	Flats and apartments	Caravans/temporary/mobile homes/houseboats	Shared between households
Isleworth	124	880	1,416	2,451	4	18
Osterley and Spring Grove	420	1,900	467	1,981	4	24

2011 Census Households
Ward	Population	Households	% Owned outright	% Owned with a loan	hectares
Isleworth	11,977	4,893	15	30	197
Osterley and Spring Grove	13,031	4,796	29	33	634

== Gallery ==
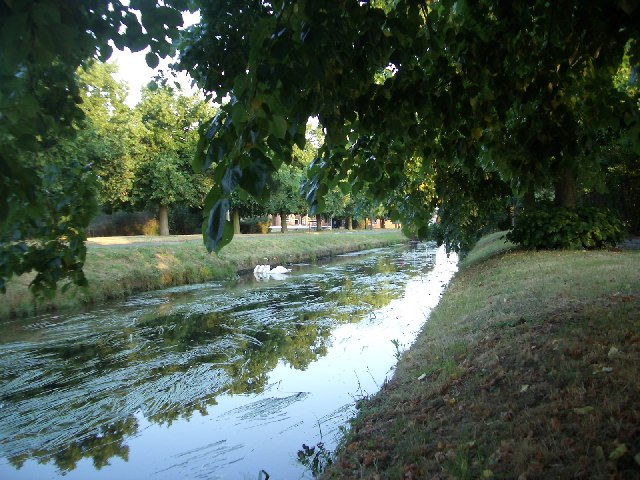
Parkland section of the Duke of Northumberland's River

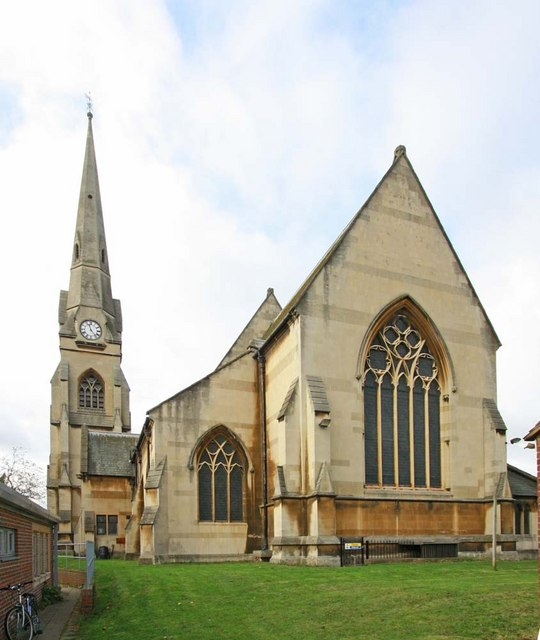
St Mary's Church, Osterley Road

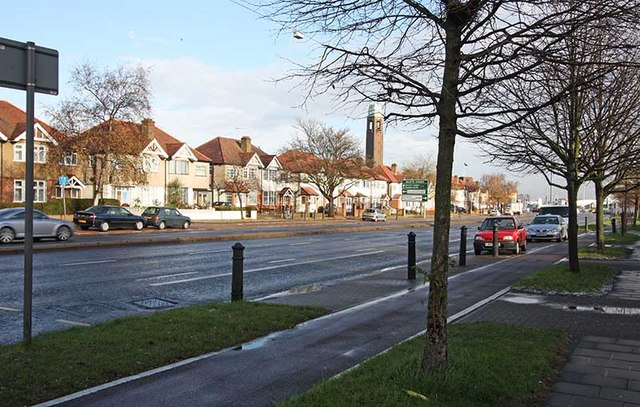
Great West Road near the Gillette Tower, Gillette Corner

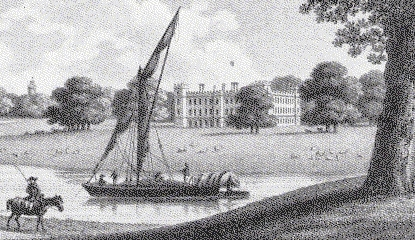
Syon House, Isleworth and partly in Brentford, in 1783

Little Syon in 1802 (Built 1592)

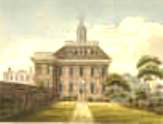
Somerset House in 1800

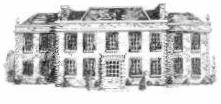
Shrewsbury House

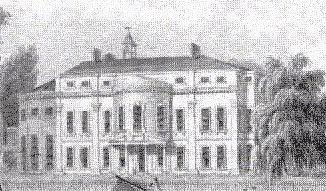
Lacy House, late 18th century
