= London Apprentice, Isleworth =

Pub in Isleworth, London

Coordinates: 51.471124°N 0.32086961°W

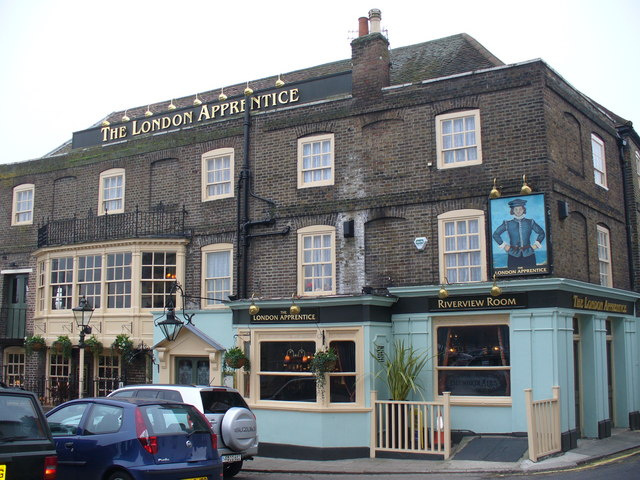
The London Apprentice

The London Apprentice is a Grade II* listed public house at 62 Church Street, Isleworth, London.

The present building dates to the early 18th century, recorded as a licensed inn by 1731. The pub overlooks Isleworth Stairs, established in the reign of Henry VIII for the ferry connecting Richmond Palace with the north bank of the Thames. It was from Isleworth Stairs that the Nine Day Queen, Lady Jane Grey, boarded the Royal Barge on 9 July 1553 to accept the throne as Queen of England, only to be imprisoned in the Tower 9 days later.
