= Chiswick House Gardens =

Major historic garden in London

Coordinates: 51°29′04″N 0°15′37″W

The Chiswick House Gardens form the grounds of Chiswick House, now in West London, England. Lord Burlington first arranged the gardens in the 1720s to match his ideas of the gardens of classical times and the Palladianism of the house. In the 1730s, William Kent created England's first landscape garden in part of the area. The gardens have influenced garden design across Britain. With changes in ownership, the gardens fell into decay; a restoration effort was made in the 1950s, and another began in 1988, continuing since then.

== A garden of ancient Rome ==
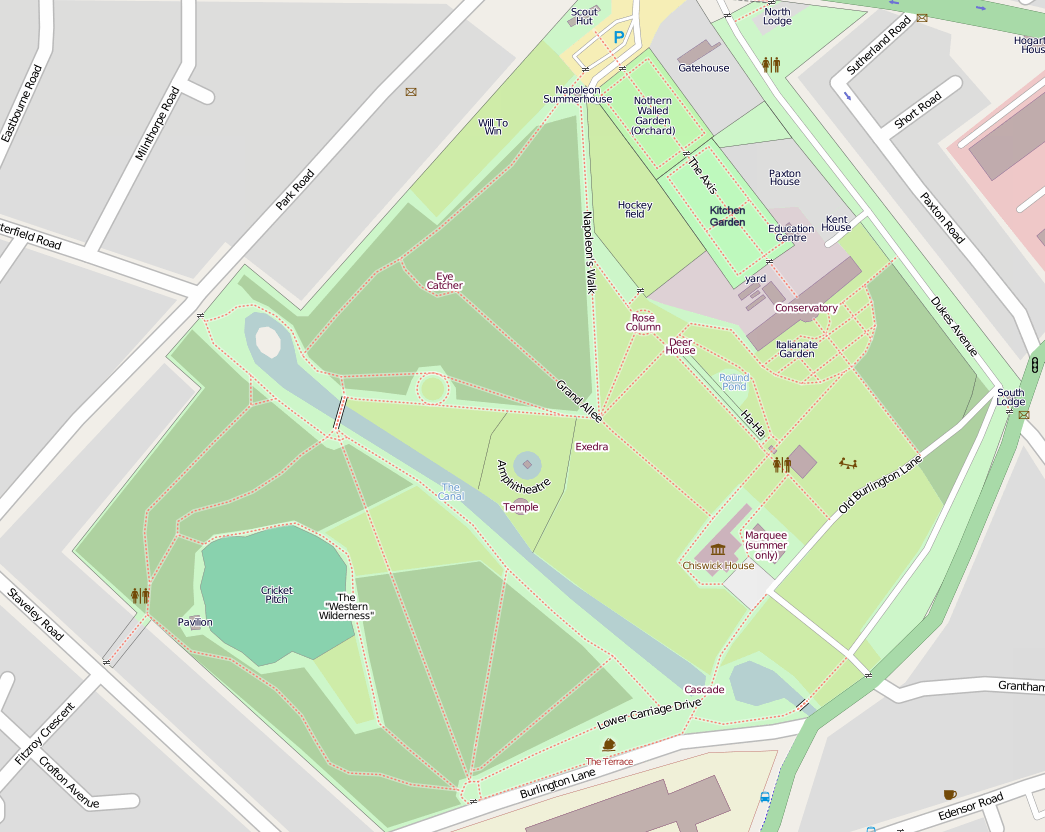
Map of the gardens, 2011

The gardens at Chiswick were an attempt to symbolically recreate a garden of ancient Rome; these were believed to have followed the form of the gardens of Greece. The gardens, like the villa, were inspired by the architecture and gardens of ancient Rome, such as the Emperor Hadrian's Villa Adriana at Tivoli, from which the three statues at the end of the exedra (according to Daniel Defoe) were alleged to have come.

The gardens at Chiswick were originally of a standard Jacobean design, but from the 1720s they were in a constant state of transition. Burlington and Kent experimented with new designs, incorporating such diverse elements as mock fortifications, a Ha-ha, classical fabriques, statues, groves, faux Egyptian objects, bowling greens, winding walks, cascades and water features.

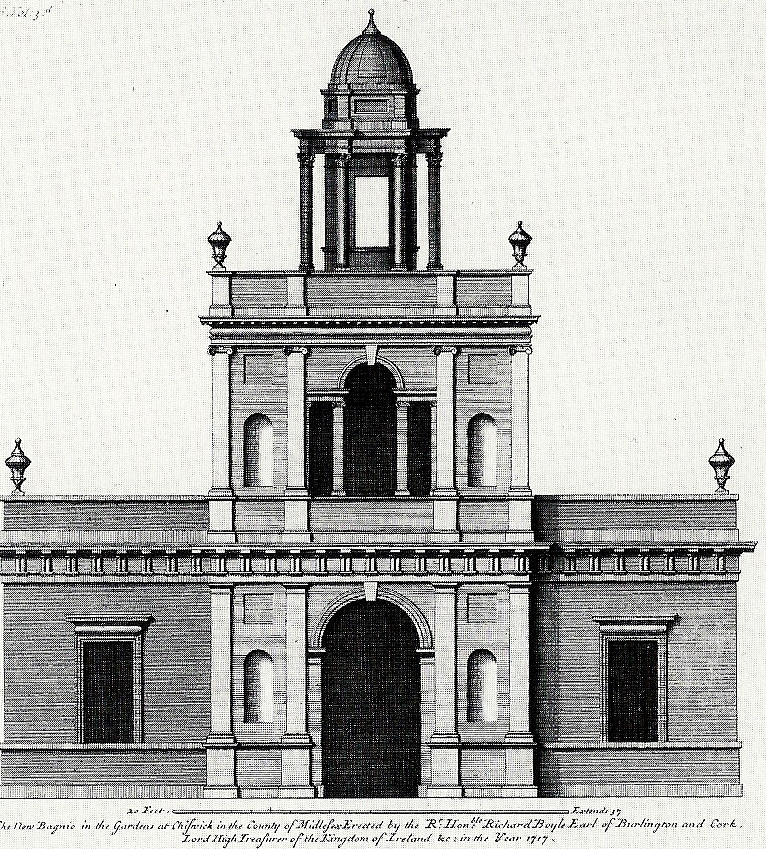
The Bagnio, designed by Lord Burlington and Colen Campbell in 1717

Authors of antiquity, such as Horace and Pliny, were major influences on 18th century thinkers through their descriptions of their own gardens, with alleys shaded by trees, parterres, topiary, and fountains. A major architect of the gardens at Chiswick was William Kent, whom Lord Burlington had brought back with him on his return from his second Grand Tour in 1719. Kent was inspired by the landscape paintings of the French artists Nicolas Poussin and Claude Lorrain. The poet Alexander Pope (who had his own villa with gardens in nearby Twickenham), was involved, and was responsible for confirming Lord Burlington's belief that Roman and Greek gardens were largely "informal" affairs, with nature ruled by God.

Evidence for this belief was provided through his translation into English of Homer's cornerstones of European literature The Iliad and The Odyssey which provided brief glimpses of Greek gardens which gave validation to Burlington's belief in the naturalistic appearance of Roman gardens. Theatrical aspects were added to the gardens by Kent, who studied the theatre and masque designs of Inigo Jones for the Stuart Court, which were owned by Lord Burlington and housed within his villa. Burlington, Kent and Pope were informed by the writings of Anthony Ashley Cooper who advocated "variety" in a garden, but not complete deformalisation.

== Garden buildings ==
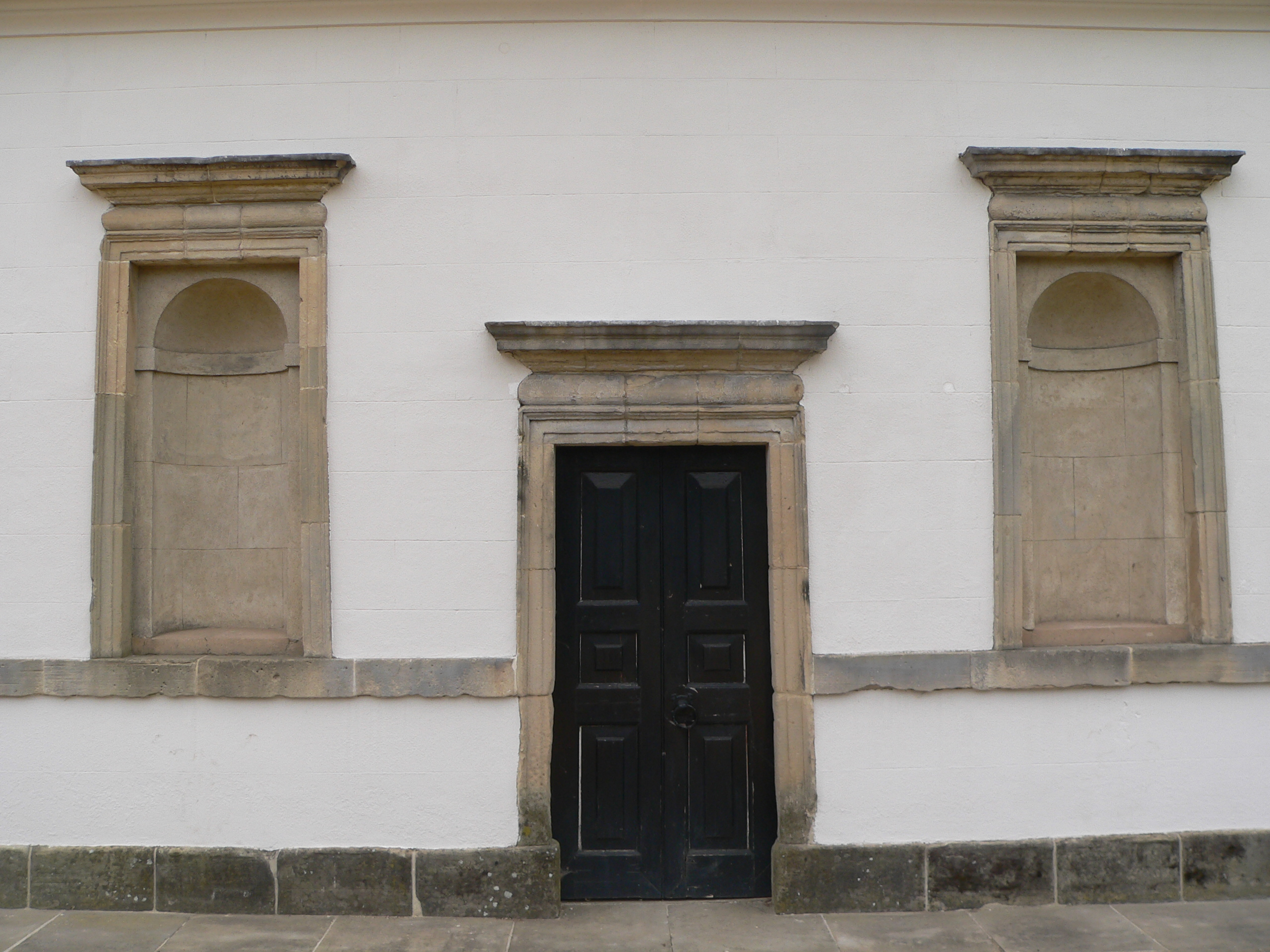
The Deer House with its Egyptianesque Vitruvian door surrounds

The gardens at Chiswick were filled with fabriques (decorative garden buildings) which illustrated Lord Burlington's knowledge of Roman, Greek, Egyptian and Renaissance architecture, and statues and architecture which expressed his Whig (and very possibly Jacobite) ideals.

Lord Burlington's garden at Chiswick was one of the first to include garden buildings and ancient statues to evoke the mood and appearance of ancient Rome. Soon, other English gardens such as Stourhead, Stowe, West Wycombe, Holkham, and Rousham followed suit, creating a type of garden which became known internationally as the English Landscape Garden. Lord Burlington's gardens at Chiswick had a number of these fabriques including the Ionic Temple, Bagnio, Pagan Temple, Rustic House, and two Deer Houses.

Beyond the exedra in the gardens lies an area known as the 'Orange Tree Garden' in which was situated a small garden building known as the Ionic Temple. The Ionic Temple is circular in form and is derived from either the Pantheon in Rome or possibly the Temple of Romulus. The portico is derived from the Temple of Portunus which Kent illustrates in the ceiling of the Red Velvet Room within the Villa. Immediately in front of the Temple lies a circular pool of water with a small obelisk positioned in its centre. Around the base of the pool are three concentric rings of raised grass, conforming originally to a 3:4:5 ratio, echoing the dimensions of the Red and Green Velvet Rooms within the Villa. A second obelisk was erected at the centre of another patte d'oie ('Goose Foot', a set of paths converging at a point) beyond the cascade to the west of the Villa.

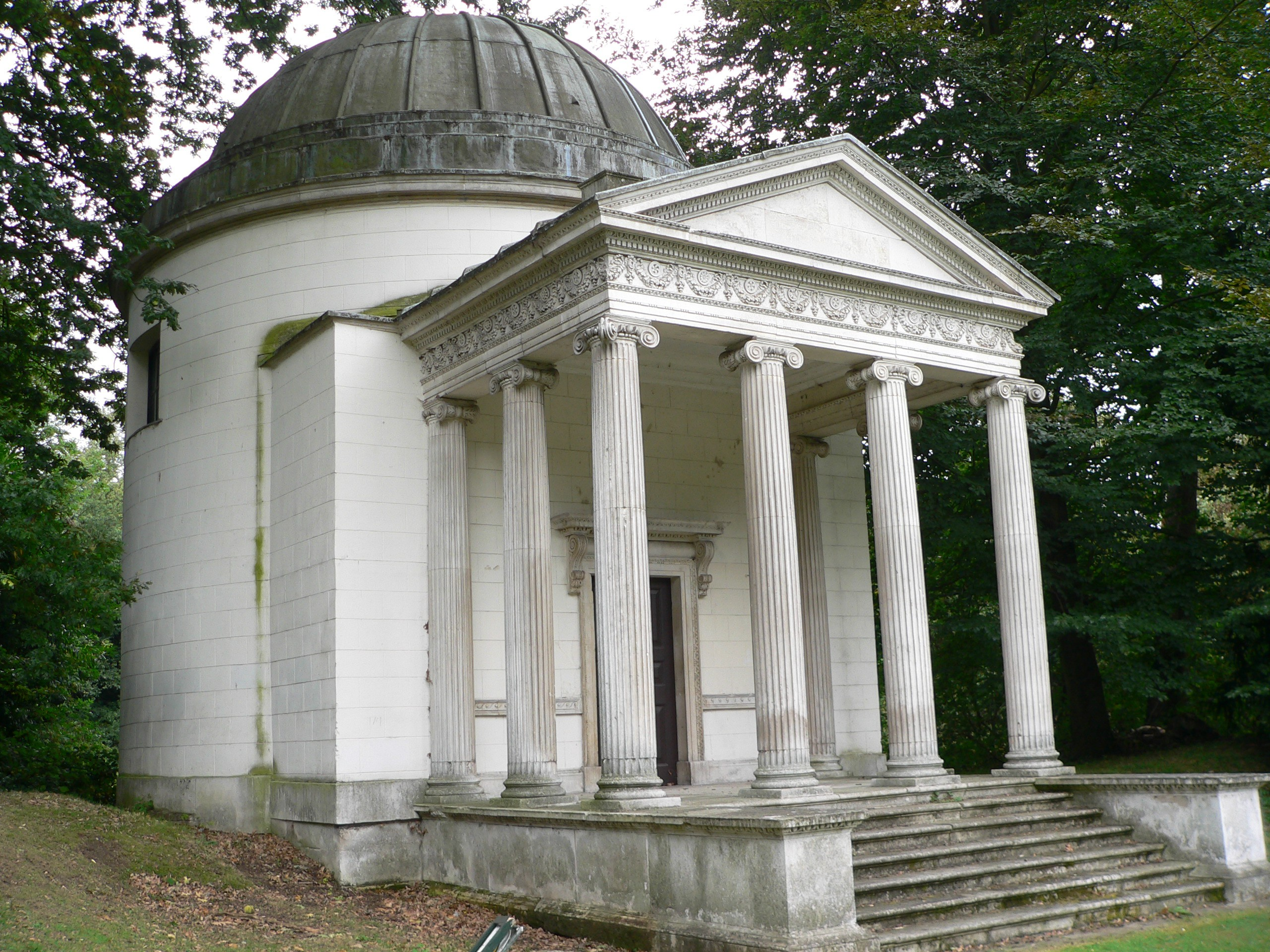
Portico of the Ionic Temple in the Orange Tree Garden

A theatre of hedges known as an exedra was designed by Kent and originally displayed ancient statues of three unknown Roman gentlemen. These three statues were later speculatively 'identified' by the writer Daniel Defoe (1659–1731) as Caesar (100–44 BC) and Pompey (106–48 BC) responsible for the decline of the Roman republic, facing a statue of Cicero (106–43 BC), the defender of the Republic. In 1733, Burlington resigned his positions within the government and went into active opposition against Robert Walpole, Britain's first Prime Minister who Burlington regarded as corrupting British politics and Whig values. However, it was the figures of the poets Horace, Homer and Virgil, the philosopher Socrates, and the leaders Lucius Verus and Lycurgus which once graced the exedra whose political message was one of democracy and anti-tyranny. (William Kent made a similar statement against Walpole for Lord Cobham. The original design by Kent for the end of the exedra was a stone 'Temple of Worthies' which was rejected by Burlington, but subsequently used by Cobham at Stowe).

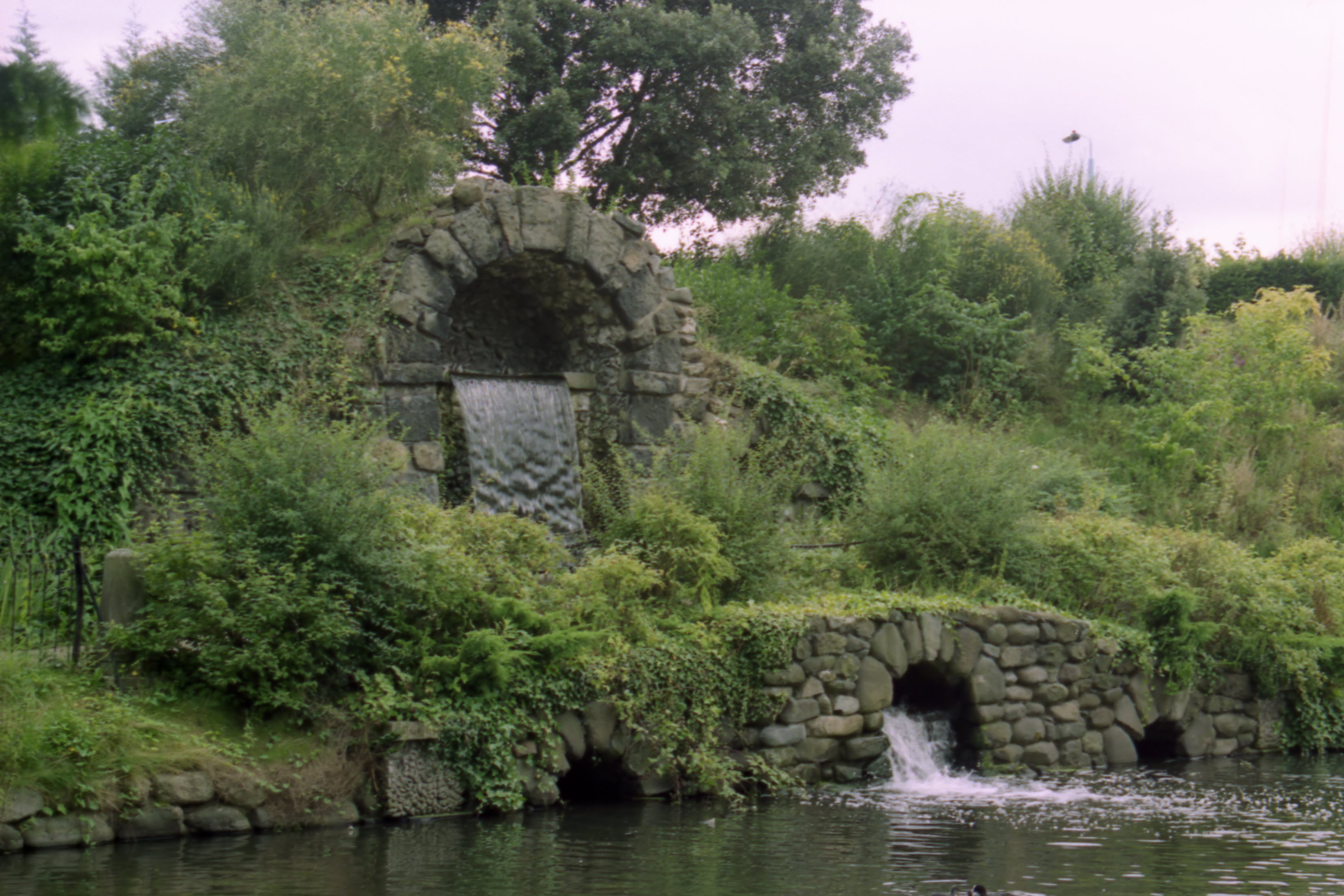
William Kent's cascade was inspired by Italian sources. It was both a waterfall and a symbolic grotto.

Kent added a cascade (a symbolic grotto), inspired by the upper cascade of the gardens of the Villa Aldobrandini. Kent added a flower garden, an orchard, an aviary (which included an owl) and a symmetrical planned arrangement of trees known as the "Grove". To the side of the Grove was a patte d'oie, or 'Goosefoot', three avenues which terminated by buildings including the 'Bagnio' (or Casino, designed by Lord Burlington and Colen Campbell) in 1716, the 'Pagan Temple' (designed by the Catholic Baroque architect James Gibbs) and the Rustic House (designed by Lord Burlington).

Terminating one end of the ha-ha stands a Deer House designed by Burlington. A second Deer House once stood at the opposite end of the ha-ha until replaced by Inigo Jones' gateway in 1738. Both Deer Houses had pyramidal roofs and characteristic 'Vitruvian' doors; a feature that comes directly from Palladio's woodcuts from his I quattro libri dell'architettura of 1570. Immediately behind the ha-ha and between the two Deer Houses was the Orangery, which, as its name suggests, originally housed Burlington's orange trees over the cold winter period (some of these trees were once positioned around the perimeter of the Ionic Temple). Part of the floor of this building was laid out in imitation of a Roman mosaic which English Heritage archaeologists in 2009 dated to the mid 18th century. Next to the remaining Deer Houses stands the Doric column on which was placed a statue of the Venus di' Medici.

== Layout ==
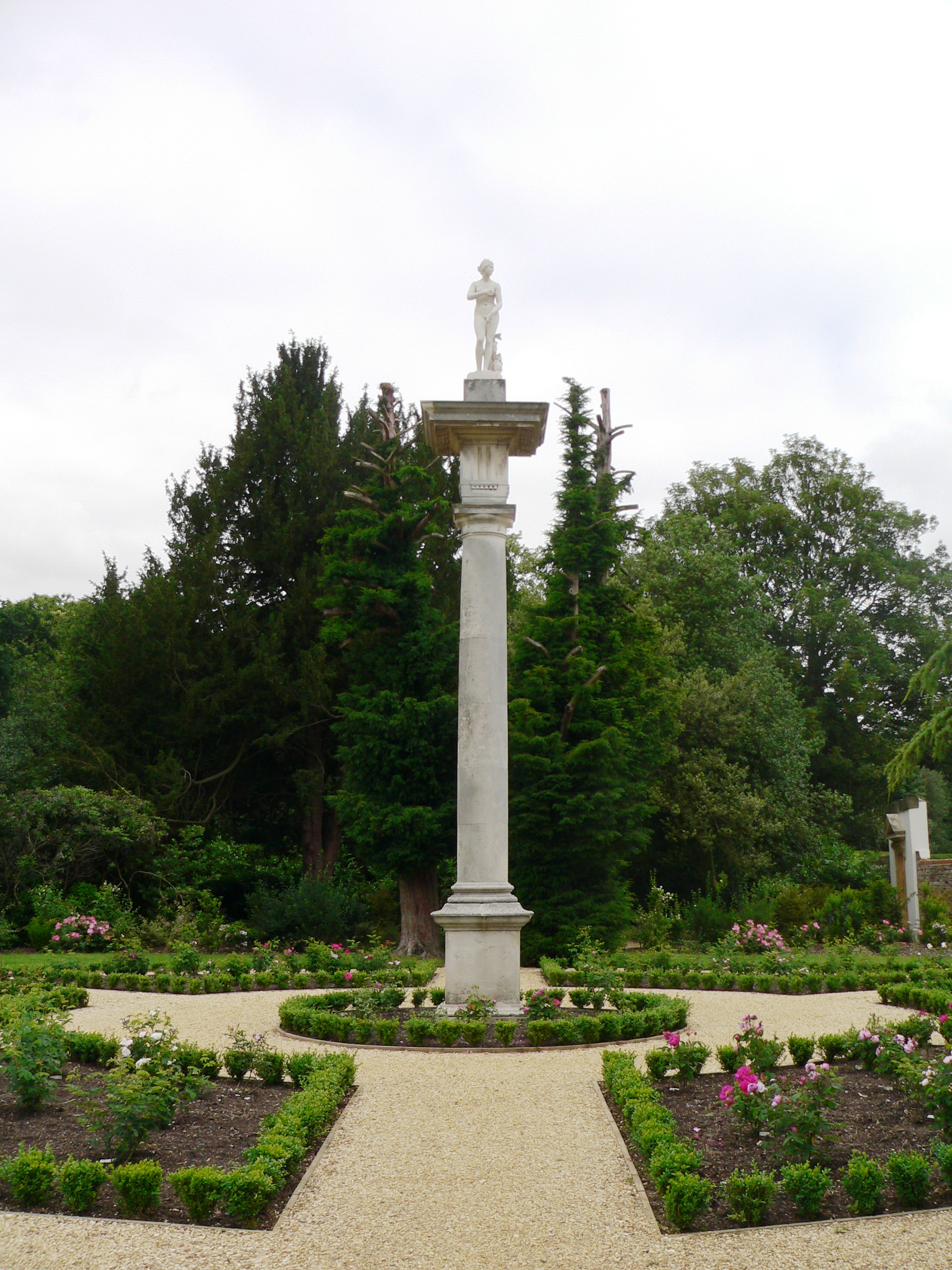
Venus was the most common garden statue in the 18th-century English garden.

In the eighteenth century statues of Venus were the most common statue in a garden as it was known that the goddess Venus was the protector of gardens and gardeners. The statue that can be seen on the Doric column today is a copy in Portland stone and was commissioned by the Chiswick House Friends in 2009. Other statues that Lord Burlington had made for the gardens included a wolf, a boar, a goat, a lion and lioness, a statue of the Roman god Mercury, a gladiator, Hercules, and Cain and Abel.

The lawn at the rear of the house was created by 1745 and planted with young Cedar of Lebanon trees which alternate with stone funerary urns designed by William Kent. Placed between the urns and the Cedar of Lebanon are three more sphinxes orientated to face the rising sun.

A lake was created around 1727 by widening the Bollo Brook. The excess soil was then heaped up behind William Kent's cascade to produce an elevated walkway for people to admire the gardens and a view of the nearby River Thames. A gateway designed by Inigo Jones in 1621 at Beaufort House in Chelsea (home of Sir Hans Sloane) was bought and removed by Lord Burlington and rebuilt in the gardens at Chiswick in 1738.

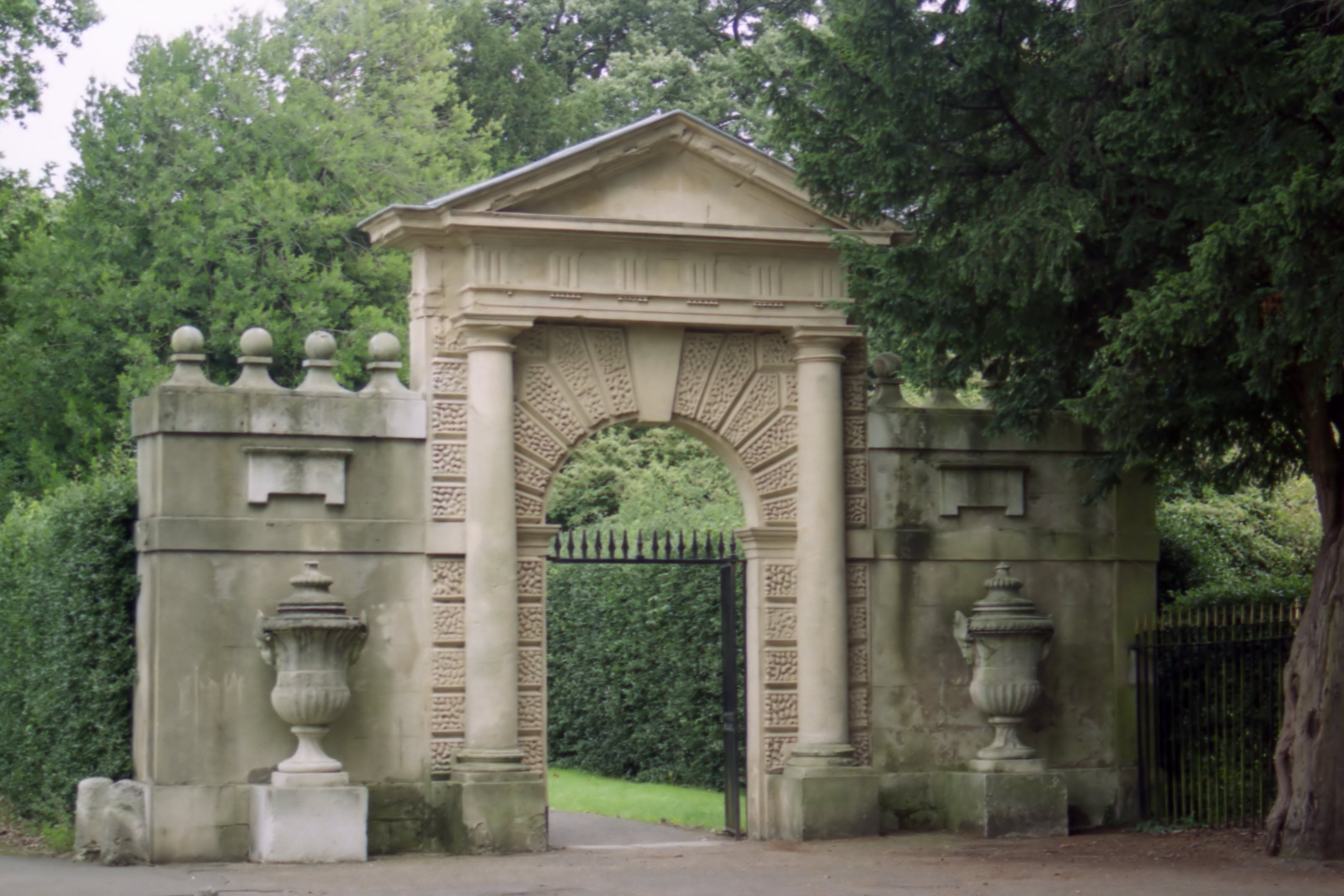
The Inigo Jones gateway, bought by Lord Burlington from Sir Hans Sloane

Lord Burlington is sometimes said to have been influenced by largely informal Chinese gardens, but the flavour of the Orient was not evoked in Burlington's classically inspired gardens, which were universally Roman in outlook. Unlike Stowe, with its Temple of Worthies and busts such as the Black Prince, Queen Elizabeth I and Shakespeare, Burlington's gardens at Chiswick did not romance or mythologise England's illustrious past. This was possibly due to Burlington's intense dislike of the Gothic style which he regarded as barbaric and backward.

Lord Burlington's gardens at Chiswick were one of the most painted of English gardens in the 18th century. The Flemish painter Pieter Andreas Rijsbrack (brother of John Michael Rysbrack) was commissioned to paint a series of eight paintings to record the transformation of the garden from formal Jacobean to informal picturesque at the end of the 1750s. Together with copies of a second set these paintings today hang in the Green Velvet Room. Other artists who were commissioned to record the appearance of the gardens were England's first landscape painter George Lambert (1700–1765), the French painter Jacques Rigaud (1681–1754) and the cartographer John Rocque (1709–1762) who produced an engraved survey of Chiswick in 1736 showing the Villa and many of its garden buildings.

The walled gardens were originally part of a house owned by Sir Stephen Fox in the 17th century. In the early 19th century the house and gardens became part of the Chiswick House estate. Fox's house was demolished, though the gardens were kept.

== Kitchen garden ==
The kitchen garden was founded in 1682. Its ownership changed several times, and the garden fell into disrepair. In 2005 it was restored by local volunteers of the Chiswick House Kitchen Garden Community project. In 2009 the kitchen garden was taken over by Chiswick House and Gardens Trust; the National Lottery Heritage Fund provided a grant for restoration work and the conversion of the surrounding buildings.

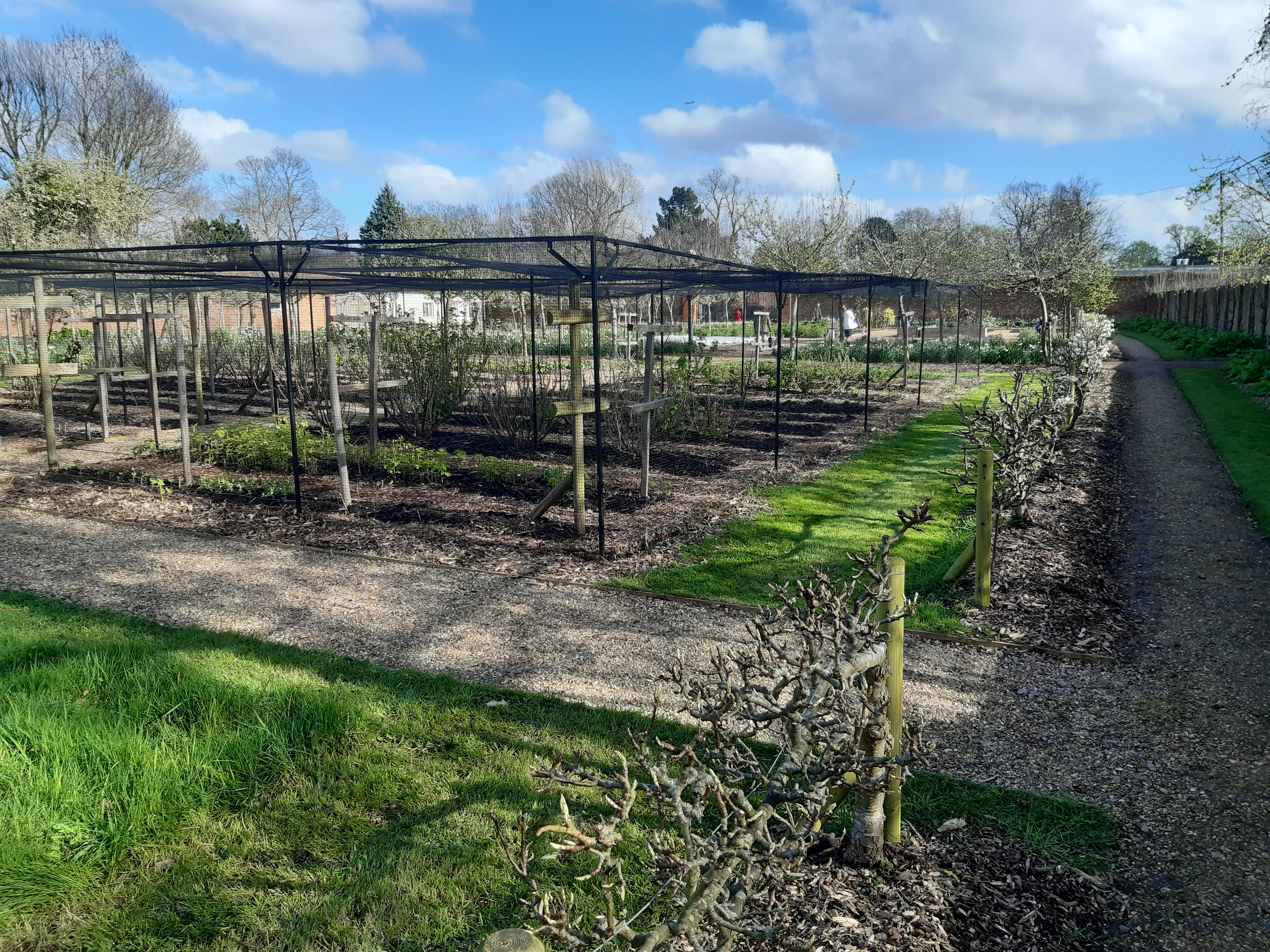
Kitchen garden: currant bushes under netting

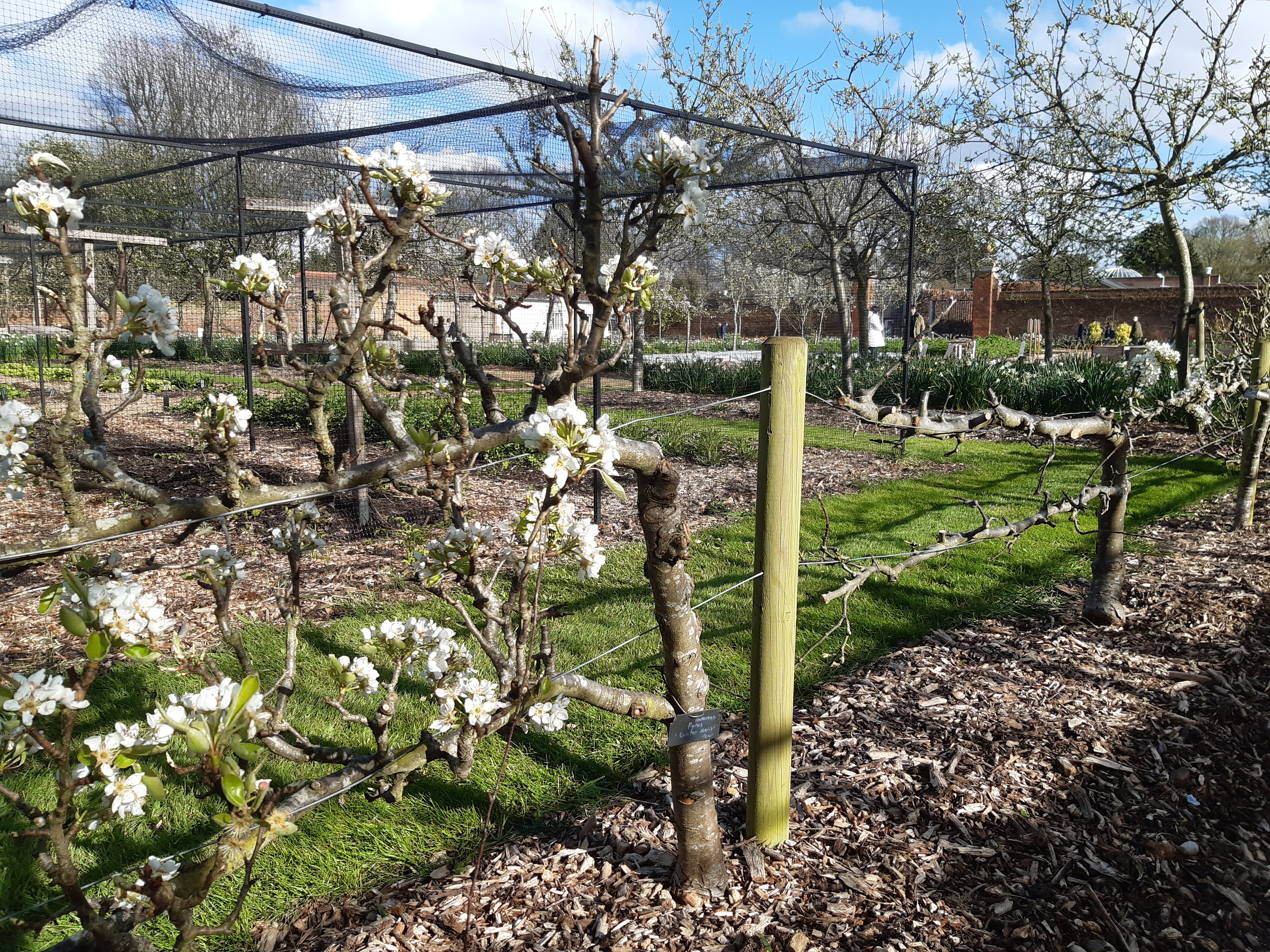
Pleached apple trees in bloom

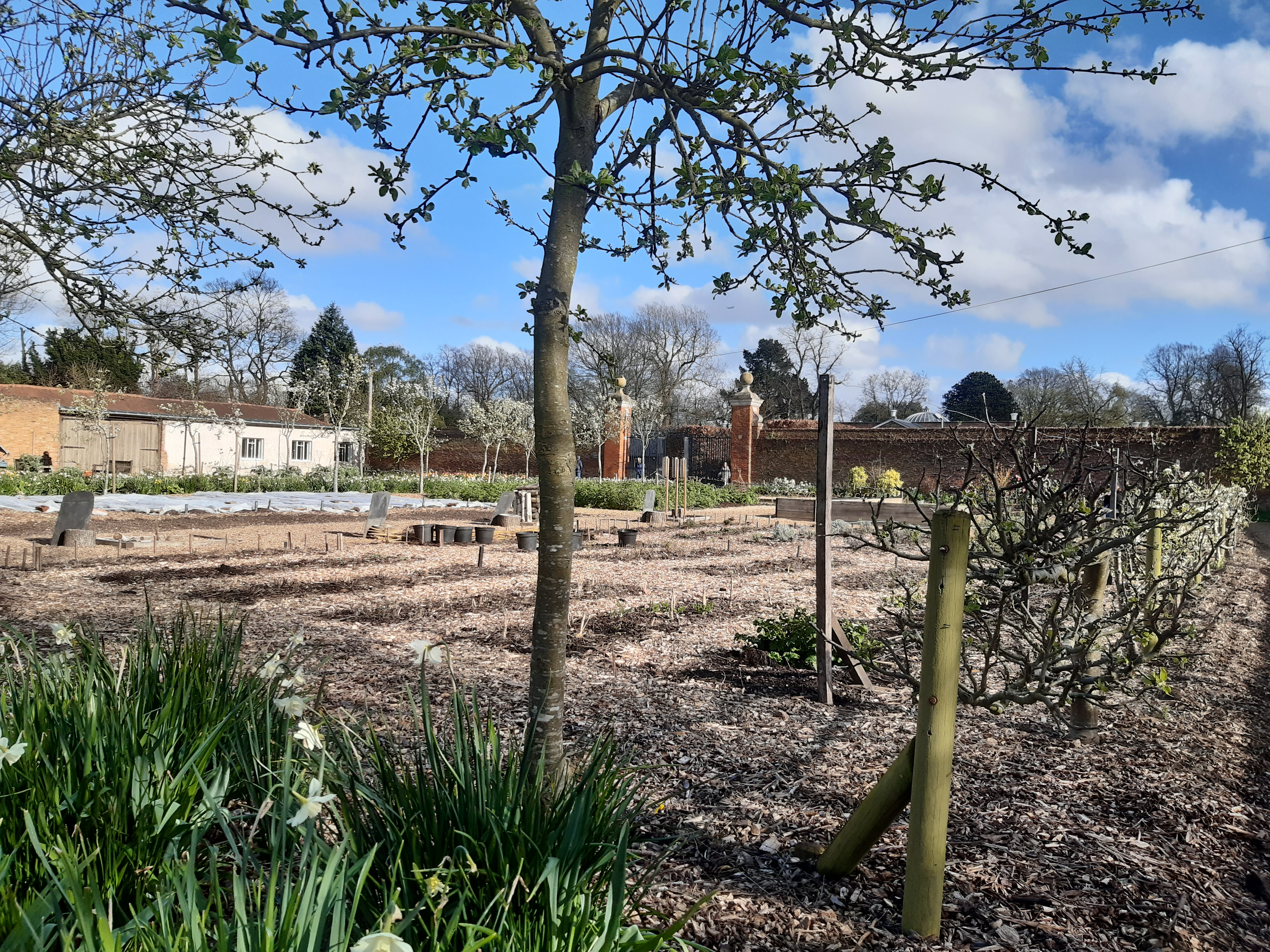
Vegetable beds

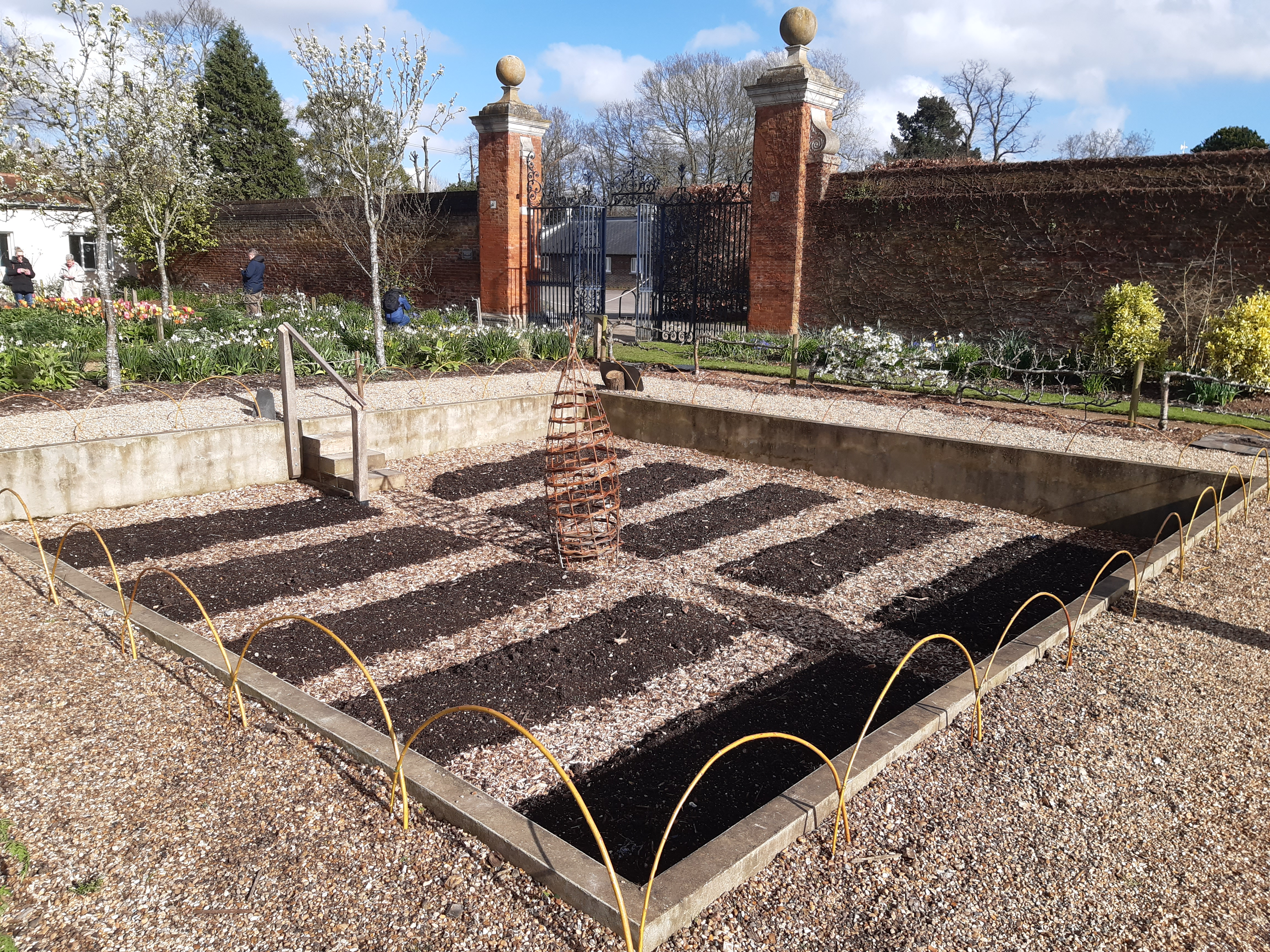
Sunken beds

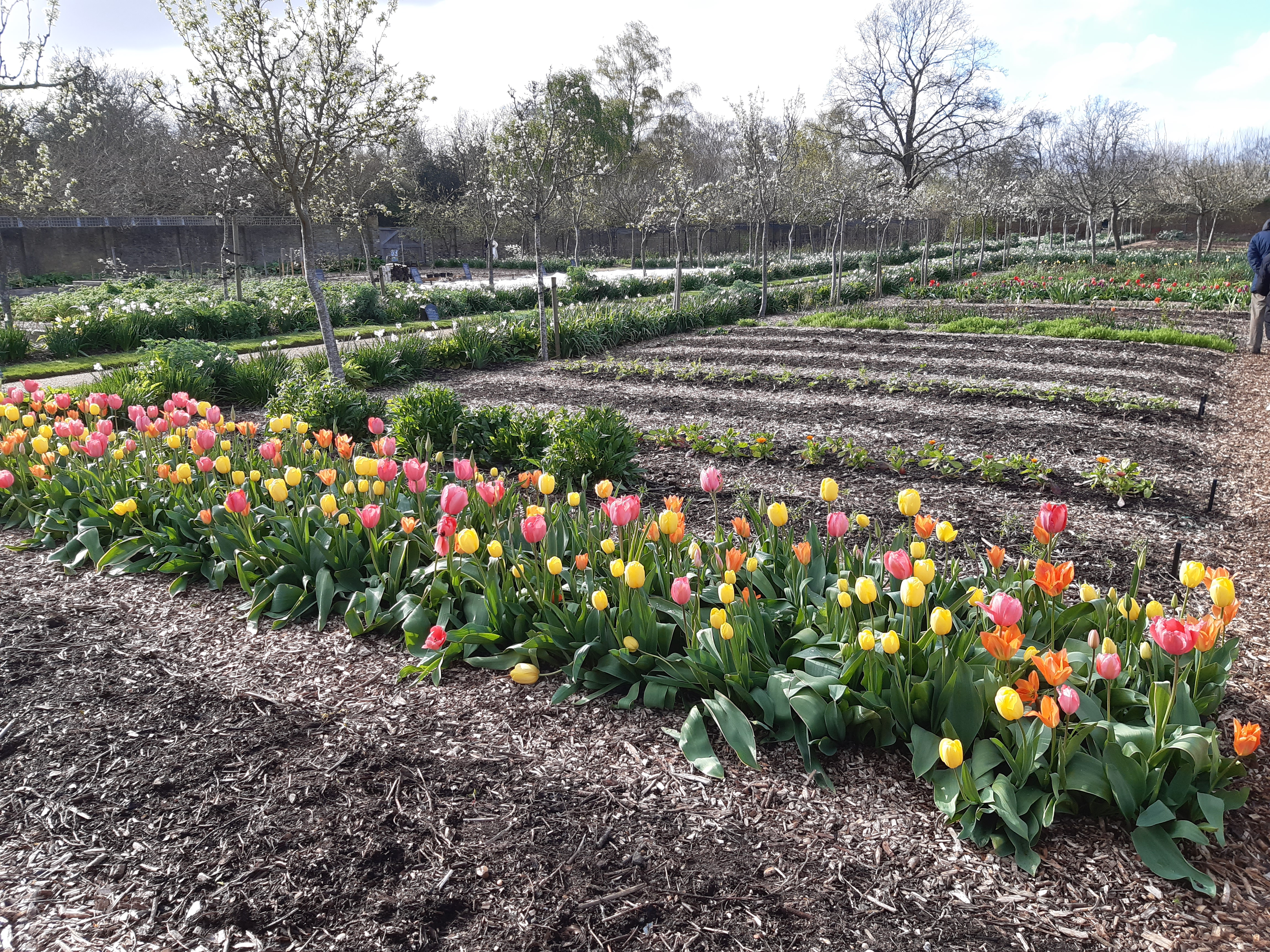
Row of tulips

== Later developments ==
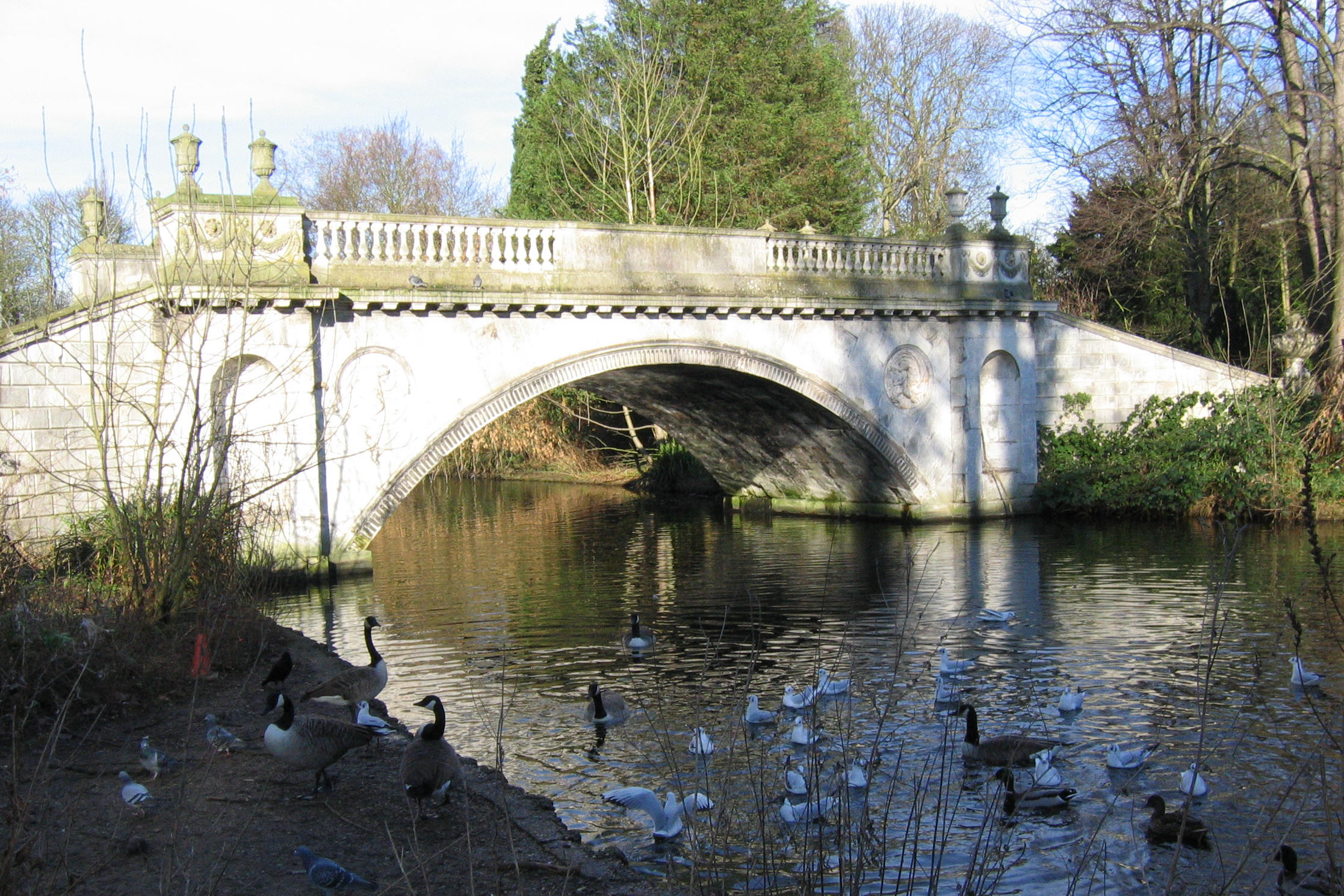
Classical stone bridge in Chiswick House grounds, designed by James Wyatt, 1774

The Classic Bridge located beyond the Orange Tree Garden was built for Georgiana Spencer. It was constructed in 1774 to the designs of James Wyatt. Alterations were made to the gardens in 1778 by the fifth Duke of Devonshire and included the demolition of the Casina in 1778 and the pulling down of the Gibbs Pagan Temple by 1784. Richard Hewlings states that the reason for such actions was not neglect but rather: "it was a change of taste, away from artificial temples located within a geometrically ordered plan". In 1784 the Duke engaged Samuel Lapidge, a landscape designer who had previously worked under Lancelot 'Capability' Brown, to make further changes to the garden, including the filling in of the northern rectangular pond. The Sixth Duke of Devonshire (the 'Bachelor' Duke) obtained permission in 1813 to relocate Burlington Road beyond the two piers at the front of the forecourt to its present position.

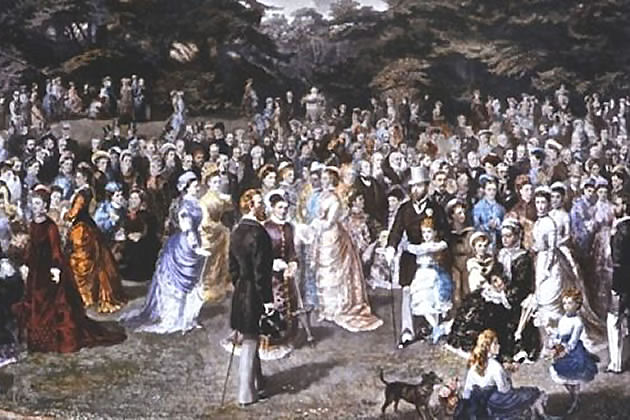
The Royal Garden Party at Chiswick, after Louis William Desanges c.1876-9. Queen Victoria hosted the party with 300 guests in the summer of 1875.

The gardens of Little Moreton Hall, an adjoining property to the east, were added in 1812, the hall itself being demolished. In that same year the Italian Garden was laid out on the newly acquired grounds to a design by Lewis Kennedy. The conservatory adjoining the Italian Garden was completed in 1813, and at 96m was the longest at that time. A collection of camellias is housed in the conservatory, some of which have survived from 1828 to this day.

The garden designer Joseph Paxton, creator of the Crystal Palace, started his career in the gardens at Chiswick for the Royal Horticultural Society before his talents were recognised by William Cavendish, the sixth Duke of Devonshire and he relocated as head gardener to Chatsworth House, Derbyshire.

== Sources ==
- Hewlings, Richard (1989). Chiswick House and Gardens (guidebook). English Heritage.
- Jacques, David (2022). Chiswick House Gardens. Swindon: Liverpool University Press on behalf of Historic England. ISBN 978-1-80085-621-9.
