= Syon Park =

Park in the London Borough of Hounslow, England

Coordinates: 51°28′34″N 0°18′29″W

- Site of Special Scientific Interest
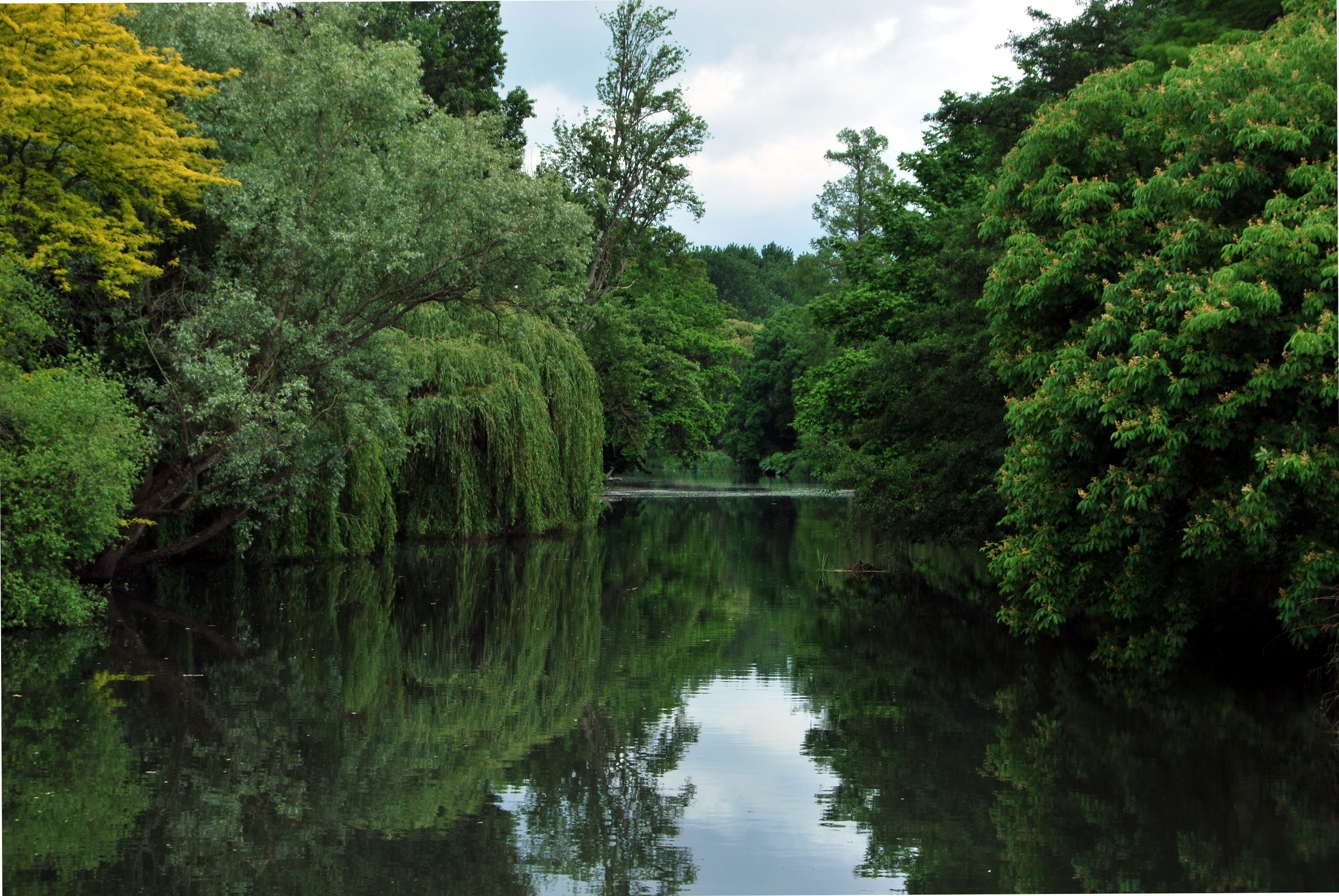
- Lake at Syon Park
- Location of Syon Park.
- Area of search: Greater London
- Grid reference: TQ176766
- Interest: Biological
- Area: 21.5 ha (53 acres)
- Notification date: 1984
- Location map: Magic Map

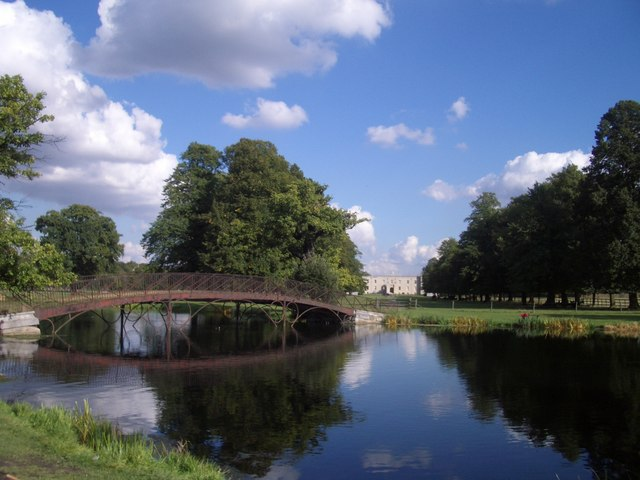
The bridge over the lake

Syon Park /ˈsaɪən/ is the garden of Syon House, the London home of the Duke of Northumberland in Brentford in the London Borough of Hounslow. It was landscaped by Capability Brown in the 18th century, and it is Grade I listed by English Heritage under the Historic Buildings and Ancient Monuments Act 1953 for its special historic interest.

The 56.6-hectare (140-acre) main gardens are a Site of Borough Importance for Nature Conservation, Grade I, and the flood meadows next to the River Thames are a biological Site of Special Scientific Interest (SSSI) and a Site of Metropolitan Importance for Nature Conservation.

== History ==
Syon was the site of Sion Abbey, which was founded in 1415 and named after Mount Zion in Jerusalem. It was dissolved in 1539. Foundations of the abbey were discovered in 2003. Landscaping of the gardens in the middle of the eighteenth century has left them with a collection of rare trees and plants and a lake which has a population of terrapins. The Great Conservatory, built in 1826 to a design by Charles Fowler, was the first to be built out of cast iron.

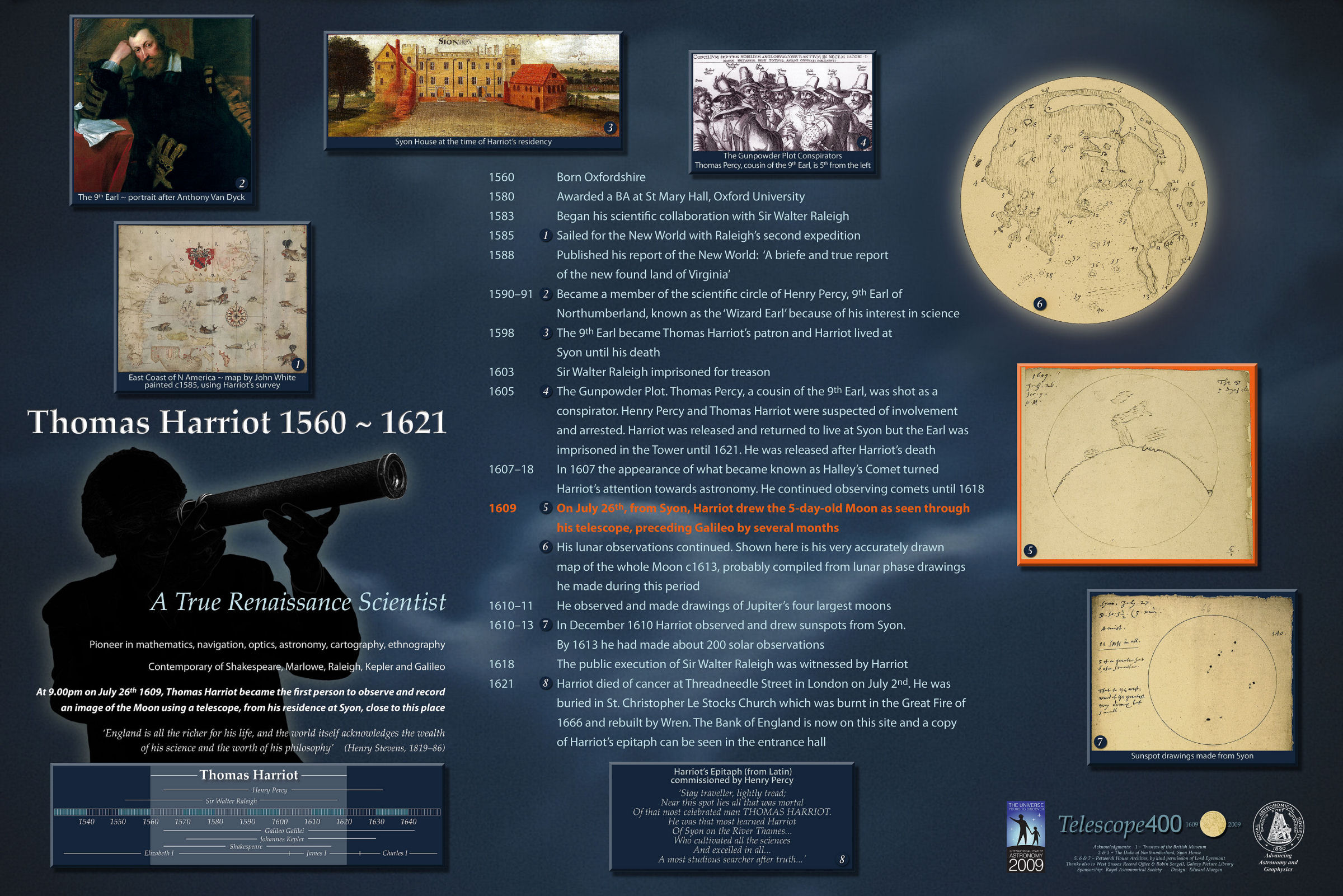
The Thomas Harriot Plaque in the grounds of Syon House (W. London).

In 1609, Thomas Harriot was working at Syon when he made the first ever use of the newly invented telescope to make astronomical drawings of the moon on 26 June, several months ahead of Galileo's observations. A plaque commemorating Harriot can be found in the grounds, not far from where the observations took place.

== Flood meadows ==
The Tide Meadow next to the Thames is a 21.5-hectare (53-acre) SSSI. It is a tall wet meadow of reed-grasses, with rye-grass and meadow-grass on higher ground. There are many small ditches, and it is used by many over-wintering birds and has a number of rare invertebrate species, including uncommon flies.

== Access ==
Access is from Park Road. The park is open for an admission charge in the summer and closed in the winter.

== See also ==
- List of Sites of Special Scientific Interest in Greater London
