= 2011 Feltham and Heston by-election =

2011 UK Parliamentary by-election

- 15 December 2011

Feltham and Heston constituency
- Turnout: 28.8%
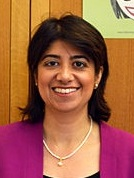

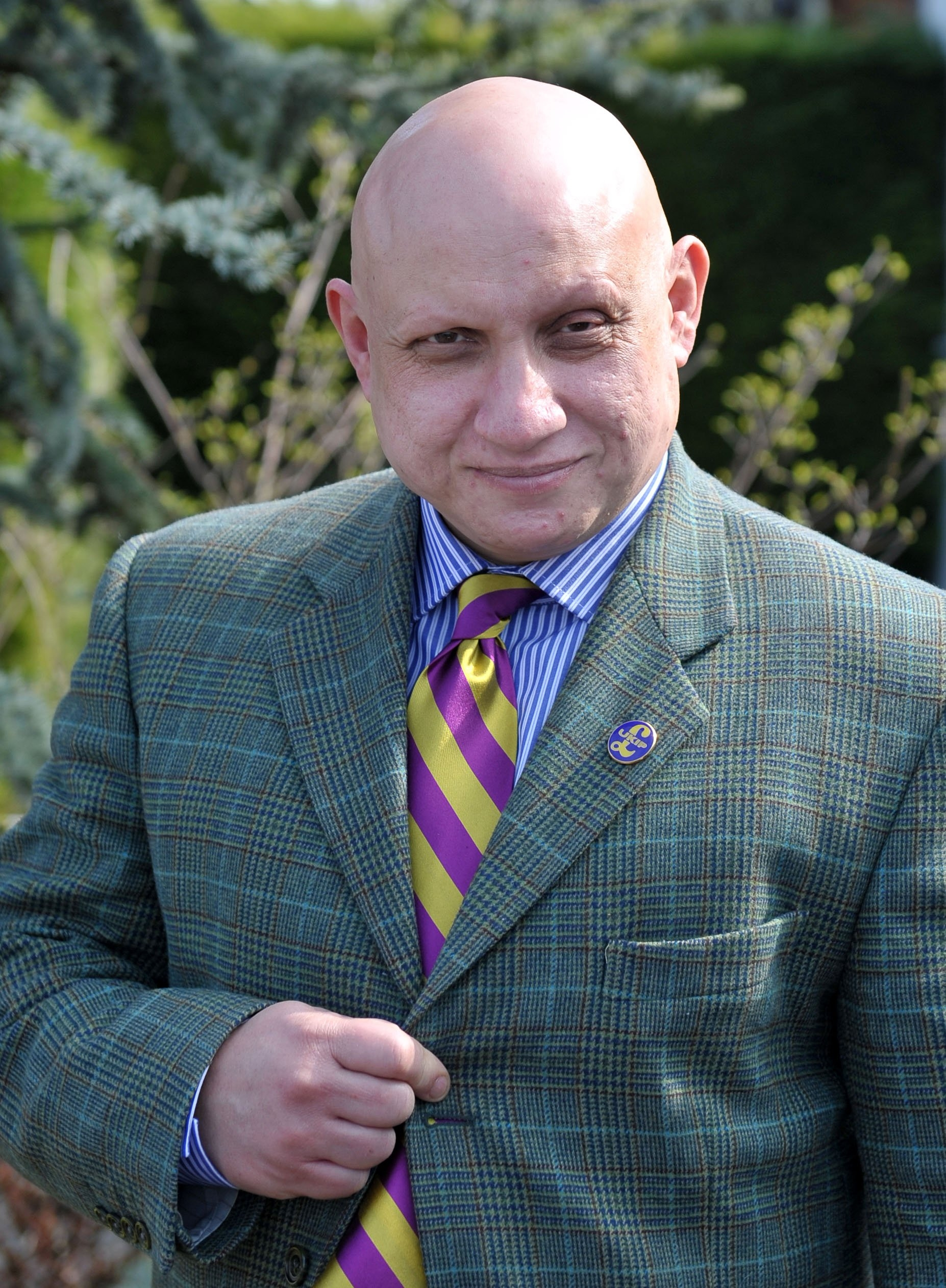
	First party	Second party
		Con
Candidate	Seema Malhotra	Mark Bowen
Party	Labour	Conservative
Popular vote	12,639	6,436
Percentage	54.4%	27.7%
Swing	▲10.8 pp	▼6.3 pp
	Third party	Fourth party
	Lib
Candidate	Roger Crouch	Andrew Charalambous
Party	Liberal Democrats	UKIP
Popular vote	1,364	1,276
Percentage	5.9%	5.5%
Swing	▼7.8 pp	▲3.5 pp
MP before election
Alan Keen
Labour
Subsequent MP
Seema Malhotra
Labour

A by-election for the United Kingdom parliamentary constituency of Feltham and Heston was held on 15 December 2011, caused by the death of incumbent Labour Party MP Alan Keen. It was won by Seema Malhotra, the Labour candidate, who held the seat with an increased vote share.

== Boundaries ==
Feltham and Heston covers the western end of the London Borough of Hounslow. Feltham lies in the western half of the constituency, Heston in the north. At the south of the constituency lies Hanworth, with Bedfont in the west. Across the parliamentary and borough boundary to the south-east lies Twickenham. Feltham & Heston shares the London Borough of Hounslow with the Brentford and Isleworth parliamentary constituency.

The constituency comprises ten electoral wards of the Borough of Hounslow: Bedfont, Cranford, Feltham North, Feltham West, Hanworth, Hanworth Park, Heston Central, Heston East, Heston West, and Hounslow West.

== Constituency profile ==
Most parts of the Feltham and Heston constituency are lower on the socio-economic scale than those in neighbouring Brentford and Isleworth. There is a higher proportion of social housing, though unemployment is low by London standards. The seat also includes parts of Hounslow itself.

To the North and West, just over the border in the London Borough of Hillingdon, is London Heathrow Airport where many local constituents are employed, while there is considerable small industry in the Heston area. The constituency includes a Young Offenders Institution and a motorway service station.

== Background and candidates ==
Alan Keen, the sitting Labour MP, died on 10 November 2011. The writ to trigger a by-election to fill the seat was moved on 24 November. The candidature deadline was 30 November.

On 24 November 2011, the UK Independence Party chose Andrew Charalambous, a former nightclub owner and Conservative Party electoral candidate. The Conservative candidate was named as Hounslow Councillor Mark Bowen on the same day.

Labour chose Seema Malhotra as their candidate on 27 November 2011 after a quickfire selection from four other candidates. Malhotra is the Director of Fabian's Women Network and was a Chair of the Fabian Society. Dave Furness was selected by the British National Party on 29 November 2011, the same day as Roger Crouch was confirmed as the Liberal Democrats nominee. Crouch is a supporter of the Liberal Democrats' Chinese branch.

Roger Cooper is the English Democrat Party chairman for their London region. David Bishop stood in the 2011 Oldham East and Saddleworth by-election in addition to being one of the 26 candidates at the 2008 Haltemprice and Howden by-election. His website explains that his party was created in protest at the capitalist system which turned Elvis Presley "into a fat media joke." George Hallam stood on a socialist platform against austerity cuts and in favour of high rates of income tax for the highest earners. He was a candidate at the 2010 general election in the Lewisham East seat under the ballot paper description "Community Need Before Private Greed". The Green Party candidate, Daniel Goldsmith, is an IT consultant from Chiswick.

== Result ==
The result was marked by a particularly low turnout of 28.8%, the lowest since Tottenham, April 2000 (25.4%) and West Bromwich West, November 2000 (27.3%). Whilst a low turnout is generally expected at by-elections, such a low turnout surprised many experts who attributed it to a couple of main factors: the relatively short space of time between the death of the sitting MP (Alan Keen) and the by-election, only 35 days in this case when the average since 1979 is 73; and the time of year, as it was held close to Christmas and during the long and cold winter nights. The electorate was 80,813.

2011 Feltham and Heston by-election
Party	Candidate	Votes	%	±%
Labour	Seema Malhotra	12,639	54.4	+10.8
Conservative	Mark Bowen	6,436	27.7	–6.3
Liberal Democrats	Roger Crouch	1,364	5.9	−7.8
UKIP	Andrew Charalambous	1,276	5.5	+3.5
BNP	Dave Furness	540	2.3	−1.2
Green	Daniel Goldsmith	426	1.8	+0.7
English Democrat	Roger Cooper	322	1.4	N/A
London People Before Profit	George Hallam	128	0.6	N/A
Bus-Pass Elvis	David Bishop	93	0.4	N/A
Majority		6,203	26.7	+17.1
Rejected ballots		75		
Turnout		23,299	28.8	−31.1
Registered electors		80,813		
Labour hold		Swing	+8.6	

=== Previous result ===
General election 2010: Feltham and Heston
Party	Candidate	Votes	%	±%
Labour Co-op	Alan Keen	21,174	43.6	−4.7
Conservative	Mark Bowen	16,516	34.0	+5.2
Liberal Democrats	Munira Wilson	6,669	13.7	−2.9
BNP	John Donnelly	1,714	3.5	N/A
UKIP	Jerry Shadbolt	992	2.0	+0.5
Green	Elizabeth Anstis	530	1.1	−1.2
Independent	Dharmendra Tripathi	505	1.0	N/A
Independent	Asa Khaira	180	0.4	N/A
Independent	Roger Williams	168	0.3	N/A
Workers Revolutionary	Matthew Linley	78	0.2	N/A
Majority		4,658	9.6	–8.7
Turnout		48,526	59.9	+12.0
Registered electors		81,058		
Labour Co-op hold		Swing	−4.8	

== See also ==
- List of United Kingdom by-elections
- Opinion polling for the 2015 United Kingdom general election
