= Alan Keen =

British politician (1937–2011)

Member of Parliament for Feltham and Heston
- In office 9 April 1992 – 10 November 2011
- Preceded by: Patrick Ground
- Succeeded by: Seema Malhotra

Personal details
- Born: David Alan Keen; 25 November 1937 Lewisham, London, England
- Died: 10 November 2011 (aged 73) Lambeth, London, England
- Party: Labour and Co-operative
- Spouse: Ann Lloyd-Fox (m. 1980)
- Children: 3
- Relatives: Sylvia Heal (sister-in-law)
- Profession: Fire protection

Military service
- Allegiance: United Kingdom
- Branch/service: British Army
- Years of service: 1960–1963

David Alan Keen (25 November 1937 – 10 November 2011) was a British Labour Co-operative politician who served as Member of Parliament (MP) for Feltham and Heston from 1992 until his death in 2011.

== Early life ==
Although born in London, Alan Keen was brought up in the Grangetown and Redcar area in the present day unitary authority of Redcar and Cleveland in the north-east of England. He went to the Sir William Turner's Grammar School in Redcar. He joined the British Army in 1960 and after nearly three years of service, in 1963, he started his career with the Fire Protection Industry where he remained until his election to the House of Commons. He also worked as a tactical scout for Middlesbrough F.C. for eighteen years.

== Parliamentary career ==
He served as a member of Hounslow Borough Council from 1986 to 1990 and was elected to Parliament at the 1992 general election when he unseated the sitting Conservative MP Patrick Ground. In Parliament he served on both the Education (1995–1996) and the Culture, Media and Sport Select Committees (1997–1999 and from 2001).

=== Policies ===
==== Heathrow Airport expansion ====
On 28 January 2009, Keen voted against a motion in Parliament calling on the government to review a decision to add a third runway to Heathrow Airport. Keen had claimed to be opposed to expansion at Heathrow for many years; stating in his consultation publication on the issue he is "opposed to an additional runway" and although he was in favour of expansion up to the present boundaries "there has to be a limit" and he believed "that limit has been reached". However at a House of Commons debate in January 2009, Keen voted in favour of the third runway.

=== Expenses ===
Together with his MP wife Ann Keen, the couple used their combined second homes allowances to buy an apartment on the South Bank of the River Thames.

In defending their part in the expenses scandal the Keen's stated "we have advocated, strongly supported, and voted for the introduction of Freedom of Information legislation. We are pleased that the point has been reached when full details of MPs' expenses are being published on a regular basis for everyone to see".

A formal investigation into the Keen’s expenses by the Parliamentary Commissioner for Standards ruled in March that the Keens had breached the expenses rules and that he regarded the breach of the rules as "serious", and involving "significant public funds". He suggested that the Keens should pay back four months worth of their claims - some £5,678. However, The Commons Standards and Privileges Committee of MPs disagreed with his findings and reduced the repayment to £1,500.

== Personal life ==
Keen's wife Ann Keen, whom he married in 1980, joined him in the Commons at the 1997 general election when she was elected for the neighbouring seat of Brentford and Isleworth. Ann held the seat until she was defeated in the 2010 general election. His sister-in-law, Sylvia Heal was an MP from 1997 to 2010 and Deputy Speakers of the House of Commons before retiring at the 2010 election.

Keen employed son David for at least 8 years as his constituency manager and senior caseworker. David and his daughter were from a previous marriage. He also had a stepson. He died in Lambeth, London, on 10 November 2011 from cancer, aged 73.

Parliament of the United Kingdom
Preceded by Patrick Ground	Member of Parliament for Feltham and Heston; 1992–2011	Succeeded by Seema Malhotra
