= Sofia Stanley =

British woman police officer

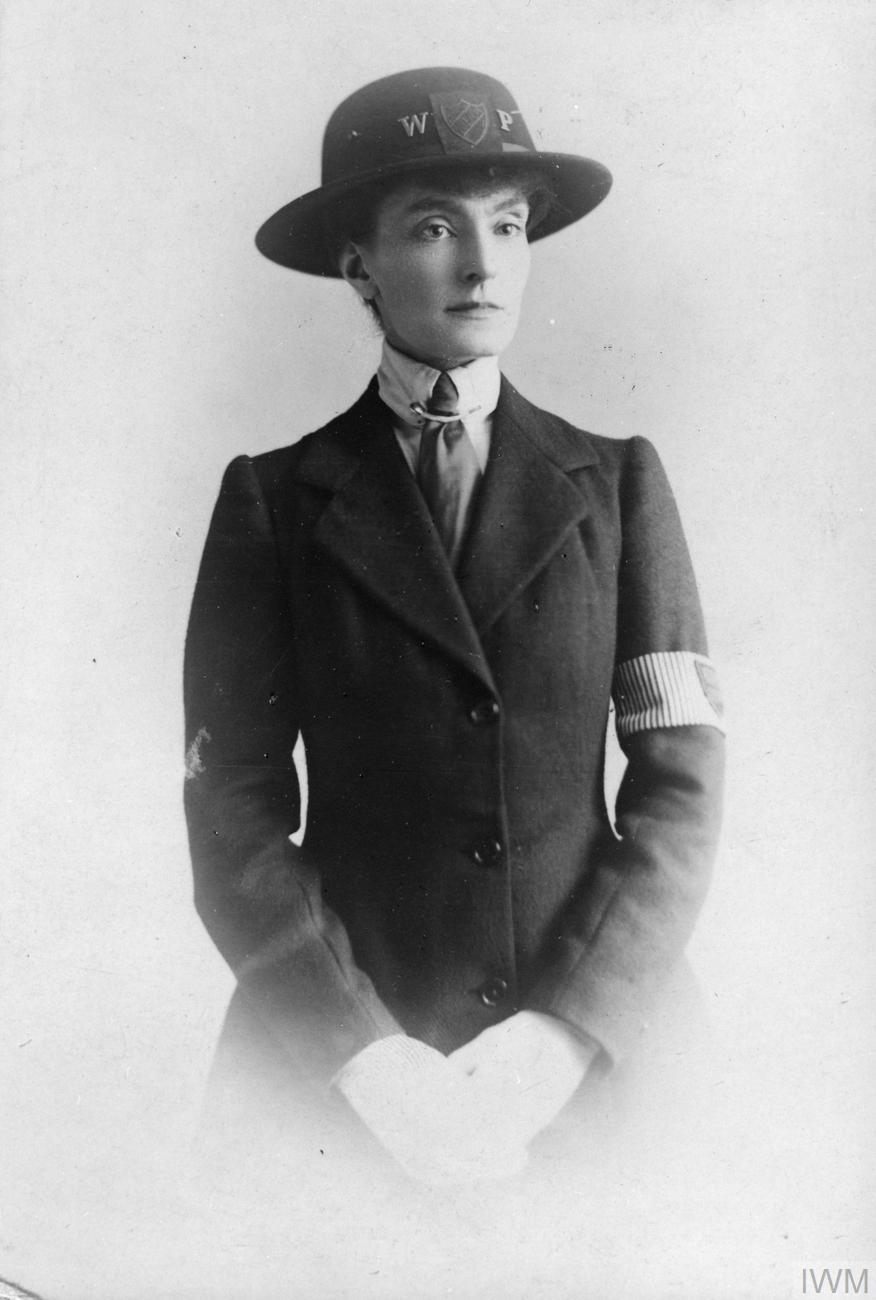
Stanley wearing the armband and hat-badge of the Women's Patrols (Imperial War Museums, Q 108496).

Sofia Anne Stanley (28 January 1873 – 24 September 1953) was the first female police officer and the first commander of the Metropolitan Police's Women Patrols from 1919 to 1922.

== Biography ==
=== Early life ===
Stanley was born Sofia Dalgairns in Palermo to the Scottish civil and mechanical engineer, David Croll Dalgairns (1839–1885) and his wife Annie Marie Christine Waygood (1852–1891). Stanley was raised a Presbyterian, although converted to High Church Anglicanism as an adolescent. Whilst very young she worked as the headmistress of St Mary's School in Poona and married Henry Johnson Stanley, an engineer for the Madras Railway, at St Mary's Church in Osterley in November 1899. They had one daughter, Theodora Christine (1902–1986), who became an architect, and later moved to Switzerland by the time of her mother's death.

=== Policing ===
Stanley became interested in police work in 1914 when she was visited by a former police officer in the Indian Civil Service. Then living in Southsea, she became a Women's Patrol Leader in Portsmouth for the National Union of Women Workers (since 1918 known as the National Council of Women of Great Britain). In March 1917 the Union appointed her as a Supervisor of its Women's Patrols in London where she raised the number of women patrolling full-time from 37 to 80. She regularly reported the Patrols' activities to Sir Edward Henry, Commissioner of Police of the Metropolis, comparing it favourably with the work of the Women's Police Service (WPS).

The Metropolitan Women Police Patrols were officially launched on 17 February 1919. Its officers were not given the power to arrest and operated based on the style of Stanley's patrols rather than the WPS, which the Commissioner believed had links to the Suffragette Nina Boyle. Stanley was put in control of the patrols with the specially-created rank of Supervisor. By February 1919 fifty women had been recruited, rising to 112 by 1922. The Geddes Axe recommended their complete abolition but Stanley worked with the first woman MP to take her seat, Nancy Astor, to force the Home Secretary Edward Shortt to leave a cadre of 20 women. However, one of the Patrols' early officers Lilian Wyles complained against Stanley's tactics, leading to a disciplinary enquiry which found Stanley guilty of intriguing against Shortt and then attempting to cover this up. As a result she was dismissed and her role as the head of women in the Met given instead to Bertha Clayden.

=== Later life ===
In later years, Stanley moved to Calcutta where she took up a role with the Royal Society for the Prevention of Cruelty to Animals. She also assisted the local police in opposing child prostitution and brothels. In 1939 she returned to the England, where she died in 1953 aged 80 at 27 Queen Anne's Grove in Bedford Park from injuries sustained in a traffic accident. She was cremated at Mortlake Crematorium
