= Heston and Isleworth (constituency) =

Parliamentary constituency in the United Kingdom, 1945–1974

- Former borough constituency for the House of Commons

1945–February 1974
- Seats: one
- Created from: Twickenham (former northern part of)
- Replaced by: Brentford & Isleworth (newly created seat); Feltham & Heston (newly created seat) (with other contributory seats)

Heston and Isleworth (/ˈaɪzəlwərθ/ EYE-zəl-wərth) was a constituency between 1945 and 1974 for the House of Commons of the UK Parliament. It contained Heston, Hounslow, Isleworth and Osterley in Middlesex which became parts of outer west London in 1965.

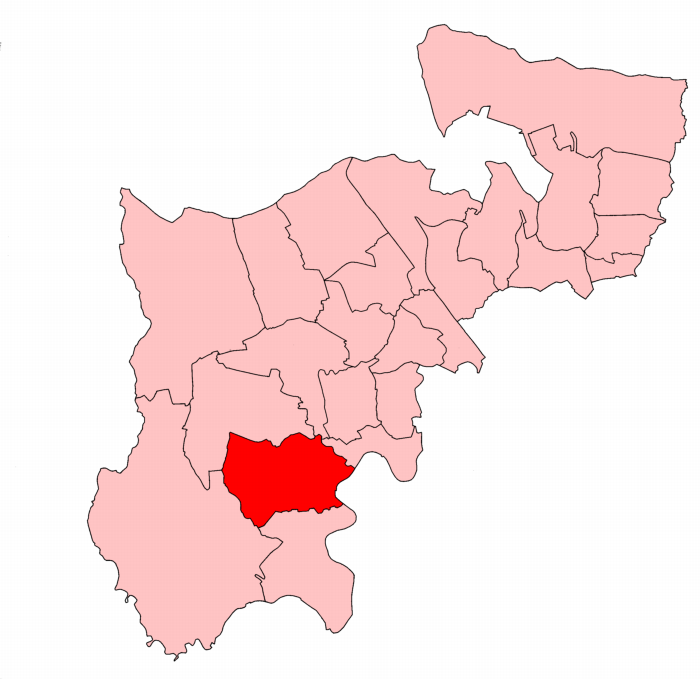
Heston and Isleworth depicted in Middlesex which was abolished during the seat's lifetime, in 1965, as a local government entity. The boundaries of nearby seats shown are those between 1945 and 1950.

Its candidates returned were Conservative except for siding with the Labour Party's landslide victory which returned the Attlee Ministry (in 1945). Conservative Richard Reader Harris saw a slim 2.25% majority at the 1966 election which saw the start of the Second Wilson Ministry.

== Boundaries ==
1950–1955: The Borough of Heston and Isleworth.

1955–1974: The Borough of Heston and Isleworth wards of Heston, Hounslow Central, Hounslow South, Hounslow West, Isleworth North, Isleworth South, and Spring Grove.

== Profile ==
The core of the two towns Hounslow and Isleworth became urban before the 19th century along with the intended senior Army officer's retirement estate of Spring Grove which adjoins Isleworth and the village centre of Heston in the north-west. Two major green tracts, part-farmland and part-ornamental skirted the seat, Osterley Park (its House being the former home of the Earl of Jersey) and Syon Park (its House being the metropolitan home of the Duke of Northumberland). They were adjoined by small rows of grand urban homes and high-attainment schools.

The area has a brief Thames riverside by largely Georgian Old Isleworth facing the international botanical centre of excellence Kew Gardens and one medieval Middlesex village hubs at Heston. The bulk of the centre and west of the seat developed into housing in the 20th century, with small parks and allotments and ending in barren, stony Hounslow Heath to the west, with many transport depots and light industrial uses. Late additions include groups of tower blocks in the northern extreme of Heston, centre of Hounslow and east of Mogden Sewage Treatment Works all erected during the short life of the seat. By contrast the inter-war houses and green low-rise-biased flats at Osterley, Heston, Woodlands, New Brentford and Hounslow are connected to within 40 minutes of Central London variously by the Hounslow Loop Line or the Piccadilly Line and were built for a London commuter belt middle class market in a range of styles. The age of the automobile and aeroplane began while Heston and Isleworth was a seat. The Great West Road was a by-pass to Brentford that became a western artery and was the catalyst for mass ribbon-development of wider-fronted housing as well as of large manufacturing buildings. The popular private offer for the "commuter" generation was pairs of semi-detached houses in 'Tudorbethan' or vernacular style, with wider windows and usually simple hipped roofs. Council housing with layouts based on Garden City ideals, and linear but edge-defining developments of flats continued until the mid-1970s.

== Members of Parliament ==
Election	Member	Party
1945	W. R. Williams	Labour
1950	Richard Reader Harris	Conservative
1970	Barney Hayhoe	Conservative
Feb 1974	constituency abolished	

== Elections ==
Heston and Isleworth seat

=== Elections in the 1940s ===
General election 1945: Heston and Isleworth
Party	Candidate	Votes	%	±%
Labour	William Williams	29,192	54.33	
Conservative	Reginald Maudling	22,623	42.10	
Independent Nationalist	Wallace Henry Glydd Drake-Brockman	1,919	3.57	
Majority		6,569	12.23	
Turnout		53,734	74.40	
Registered electors		72,219		
Labour win (new seat)				

=== Elections in the 1950s ===
General election 1950: Heston and Isleworth
Party	Candidate	Votes	%	±%
Conservative	Richard Reader Harris	33,292	50.07	+7.97
Labour	William Williams	29,013	43.64	−9.69
Liberal	Duncan Keith Overell	4,183	6.29	New
Majority		4,279	6.44	N/A
Turnout		66,488	86.06	+11.66
Registered electors		77,262		
Conservative gain from Labour		Swing	+8.83	

General election 1951: Heston and Isleworth
Party	Candidate	Votes	%	±%
Conservative	Richard Reader Harris	35,468	54.22	+4.15
Labour	Peter A W Merriton	29,944	45.78	+2.14
Majority		5,524	8.44	−3.79
Turnout		65,412	83.81	−2.25
Registered electors		78,048		
Conservative hold		Swing	+1.01	

General election 1955: Heston and Isleworth
Party	Candidate	Votes	%	±%
Conservative	Richard Reader Harris	25,705	57.25	+3.03
Labour	Olive Mary Renier	19,193	42.75	−3.03
Majority		6,512	14.50	+6.06
Turnout		44,898	78.93	−4.88
Registered electors		56,881		
Conservative hold		Swing	+3.03	

General election 1959: Heston and Isleworth
Party	Candidate	Votes	%	±%
Conservative	Richard Reader Harris	24,486	54.43	−2.82
Labour	Thomas Ponsonby	15,636	34.76	−7.99
Liberal	Wilfred Percival Letch	4,867	10.82	New
Majority		8,850	19.67	+5.17
Turnout		44,989	81.62	+2.69
Registered electors		55,121		
Conservative hold		Swing	+2.59	

=== Elections in the 1960s ===
General election 1964: Heston and Isleworth
Party	Candidate	Votes	%	±%
Conservative	Richard Reader Harris	19,181	46.51	−7.92
Labour	John Dore	15,651	37.95	+3.19
Liberal	Harry Charles Seigal	6,409	15.54	+4.72
Majority		3,530	8.56	−11.11
Turnout		41,241	78.25	−3.37
Registered electors		52,703		
Conservative hold		Swing	-5.56	

General election 1966: Heston and Isleworth
Party	Candidate	Votes	%	±%
Conservative	Richard Reader Harris	18,222	44.36	−2.15
Labour	Neville Sandelson	17,296	42.11	+4.16
Liberal	Richard L. Afton	5,559	13.53	−2.01
Majority		926	2.25	−6.31
Turnout		41,077	79.92	+1.67
Registered electors		51,400		
Conservative hold		Swing	-3.16	

=== Elections in the 1970s ===
General election 1970: Heston and Isleworth
Party	Candidate	Votes	%	±%
Conservative	Barney Hayhoe	21,580	55.96	+11.63
Labour	Geoffrey J Samuel	16,981	44.04	+1.93
Majority		4,599	11.92	+9.67
Turnout		38,561	71.54	−8.38
Registered electors		53,902		
Conservative hold		Swing	+4.85	
