= Feltham and Heston =

UK Parliament constituency (since 1974)

Coordinates: 51.460°N 0.412°W

- Borough constituency for the House of Commons
- Interactive map of boundaries from 2024
- Boundary within Greater London
- County: Greater London
- Electorate: 75,226 (March 2020)
- Major settlements: Feltham, Heston and Hounslow (part)

Current constituency
- Created: 1974
- Member of Parliament: Seema Malhotra (Labour Co-op)
- Seats: One
- Created from: Feltham; Heston & Isleworth

Feltham and Heston is a constituency (Note: A borough constituency (for the purposes of election expenses and type of returning officer).) in Greater London created in 1974 and represented in the House of Commons of the UK Parliament. Since 2011, its Member of Parliament (MP) has been Seema Malhotra of Labour Co-op. (Note: As with all constituencies, the constituency elects one Member of Parliament (MP) by the first past the post system of election at least every five years.)

== History ==
The seat has been confined throughout to the western electoral half of the London Borough of Hounslow. Its main predecessor seat was Feltham, comprising Feltham, Bedfont, Hanworth, Hounslow Heath and Cranford; the other direct forerunner Heston and Isleworth contributed its former westernmost settlements: Heston and Hounslow West. Before 1945 about a third of the present area and half of its then-population were in the Twickenham seat (formed in 1885), the remainder, Feltham, Hanworth and Bedfont were in the Spelthorne seat (formed in 1918 from the southern part of Uxbridge (UK Parliament constituency)).

== Constituency profile ==
Proximity of gravel to the surface of the near-flat land — see Hounslow Heath — restricted productivity and diversity of plant life across the constituency and caused initially cheap land values, a factor which led the area to significant industrial use since the mid-19th century and construction of London Heathrow Airport, the area's largest employer including its many import/export businesses. The area at central Feltham and on the busy and the somewhat slower (to Central London) Piccadilly line at two tube stations in the north connects into London and the latter also connects to Heathrow Airport.

This part of the Borough of Hounslow since 1955 has the great majority of its 12.3 square kilometres (4.7 sq mi) of Metropolitan Green Belt, forming an immediate buffer zone for all of Greater London. The M4 motorway and dualled parts of the A4, A30 and A316 roads run close to a significant minority of homes. Many local initiatives seek to abate pollution in the Borough and other have successfully attracted major retail and leisure into Feltham and Hounslow, both of which were large villages rather than market towns in the 18th and 19th centuries.

The constituency is lower on the socio-economic scales than those in neighbouring Brentford and Isleworth. There is higher proportion of social housing, though unemployment is proportionally low by London standards. The seat also includes the western part of the slightly larger urban centre, Hounslow.

The constituency is to the southeast of London Heathrow Airport where many local constituents work, and small storage, distribution businesses are a feature of this half of the borough, as well as light industry and office accommodation. Next to Cranford on the A4 Bath Road are most of the luxury airport hotels, (Note: see Heathrow) and an imposing 1998 conversion of an office tower into a hotel in Feltham's linear town centre. The seat includes a Young Offenders Institution, small business and industrial park and a motorway service station. Across all wards, car ownership is much higher than the London average; for the small proportion of people (who work in the City), Feltham railway station, Hounslow West Underground station, Hounslow Central Underground station and Hatton Cross Underground station provide good links from several areas to the capital.

== Political history ==
The seat has been held by the Labour Party from 1992 onwards, with their highest margin of victory being 35% in 2001, and lowest margin of victory being 3.3%, in 1992. The Conservatives have finished in second place at each general election since.

The current MP Seema Malhotra (Labour Co-operative) was first elected at the 2011 by-election after the death of the previous Labour MP Alan Keen, who had won the seat from Patrick Ground of the Conservatives in 1992.

The seat is a reasonably safe seat for the Labour Party. Although Labour's majority was halved in the 2019 election, the seat was still retained by nearly 8,000 votes.

== Boundaries ==
=== Historic ===
1974–1997: The London Borough of Hounslow wards of Cranford, East Bedfont, Feltham Central, Feltham North, Feltham South, Hanworth, Heston Central, Heston East, Heston West, Hounslow Heath, and Hounslow West.

1997–2024: The London Borough of Hounslow wards of Bedfont, Cranford, Feltham North, Feltham West, Hanworth Village, Hanworth Park, Heston Central, Heston East, Heston West and Hounslow West.

=== Current ===
Further to the 2023 review of Westminster constituencies, which came into effect for the 2024 general election, the constituency is composed of:

- The London Borough of Hounslow wards of Bedfont, Cranford, Feltham North, Feltham West, Hanworth Village, Hanworth Park, Heston Central, Heston West and Hounslow West.

Heston East ward transferred to Brentford and Isleworth to bring the electorate within the permitted range.

Feltham and Heston covers the western half of the London Borough of Hounslow. Feltham occupies the southern part of the L-shape formed by the borough. Heston occupies the far north bounded by the M4 motorway. In the south of the constituency is Hanworth, with Bedfont in the far west — both are postally parts of Feltham.

The London Borough of Hounslow's central areas are within the Brentford and Isleworth seat, with Chiswick in the east now included in Hammersmith and Chiswick.

== Members of Parliament ==
Election	Member	Party
Feb 1974	Russell Kerr	Labour
1983	Patrick Ground	Conservative
1992	Alan Keen	Labour Co-op
2011 by-election	Seema Malhotra	Labour Co-op

== Election results ==
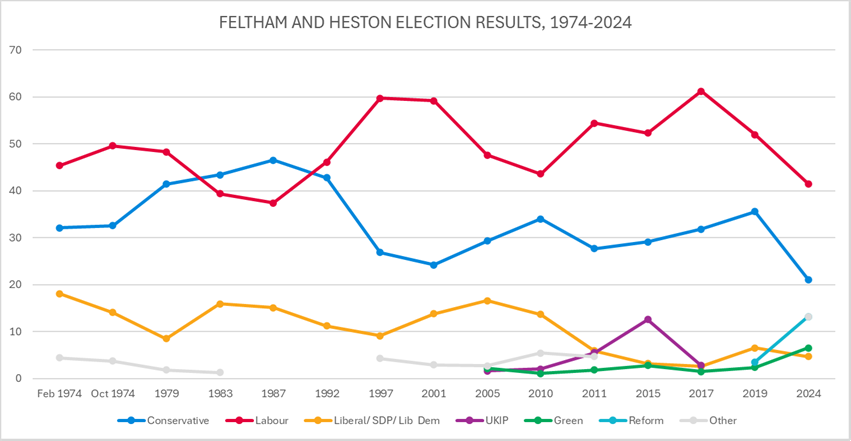
Election results 1974-2024

=== Elections in the 2020s ===
General election 2024: Feltham and Heston
Party	Candidate	Votes	%	±%
Labour Co-op	Seema Malhotra	16,139	41.5	−10.2
Conservative	Reva Gudi	8,195	21.1	−14.7
Reform	Prabhdeep Singh	5,130	13.2	+9.7
Green	Katharine Kandelaki	2,543	6.5	+4.1
Workers Party	Amritpal Mann	2,201	5.7	N/A
Liberal Democrats	Dhruv Sengupta	1,821	4.7	−1.9
Independent	Abdul Majid Tramboo	1,658	4.3	N/A
Independent	Ian Brown	454	1.2	N/A
Independent	Aysha Choudhury	373	1.0	N/A
Independent	Damian Read	373	1.0	N/A
Majority		7,944	20.4	+4.5
Turnout		38,887	50.5	–7.8
Registered electors		76,983		
Labour hold		Swing	▲2.3	

=== Elections in the 2010s ===
2019 notional result
Party	Vote	%
Labour	22,698	51.7
Conservative	15,705	35.8
Liberal Democrats	2,907	6.6
Brexit Party	1,524	3.5
Green	1,049	2.4
Turnout	43,883	58.3
Electorate	75,226	

General election 2019: Feltham and Heston
Party	Candidate	Votes	%	±%
Labour Co-op	Seema Malhotra	24,876	52.0	−9.2
Conservative	Jane Keep	17,017	35.6	+3.8
Liberal Democrats	Hina Malik	3,127	6.5	+3.9
Brexit Party	Martyn Nelson	1,658	3.5	New
Green	Tony Firkins	1,133	2.4	+0.9
Majority		7,859	16.4	−13.0
Turnout		47,811	59.1	−5.8
Registered electors		80,932		
Labour Co-op hold		Swing	-6.5	

General election 2017: Feltham and Heston
Party	Candidate	Votes	%	±%
Labour Co-op	Seema Malhotra	32,462	61.2	+8.9
Conservative	Samir Jassal	16,859	31.8	+2.7
UKIP	Stuart Agnew	1,510	2.8	−9.8
Liberal Democrats	Hina Malik	1,387	2.6	−0.6
Green	Tony Firkins	809	1.5	−1.3
Majority		15,603	29.4	+6.2
Turnout		53,027	64.9	+4.9
Registered electors		81,714		
Labour Co-op hold		Swing	+3.1	

General election 2015: Feltham and Heston
Party	Candidate	Votes	%	±%
Labour Co-op	Seema Malhotra	25,845	52.3	+8.7
Conservative	Simon Nayyar	14,382	29.1	−4.9
UKIP	Peter Dul	6,209	12.6	+10.6
Liberal Democrats	Roger Crouch	1,579	3.2	−10.5
Green	Tony Firkins	1,390	2.8	+1.7
Majority		11,463	23.2	+13.6
Turnout		49,405	60.0	+0.1
Registered electors		82,340		
Labour Co-op hold		Swing	+6.8	

2011 Feltham and Heston by-election
Party	Candidate	Votes	%	±%
Labour Co-op	Seema Malhotra	12,639	54.4	+10.8
Conservative	Mark Bowen	6,436	27.7	–6.3
Liberal Democrats	Roger Crouch	1,364	5.9	−7.9
UKIP	Andrew Charalambous	1,276	5.5	+3.5
BNP	Dave Furness	540	2.3	−1.2
Green	Daniel Goldsmith	426	1.8	+0.7
English Democrat	Roger Cooper	322	1.4	New
London People Before Profit	George Hallam	128	0.6	New
Bus-Pass Elvis	David Bishop	93	0.4	New
Majority		6,203	26.7	+17.1
Rejected ballots		75		
Turnout		23,224	28.7	−31.2
Registered electors		80,813		
Labour Co-op hold		Swing	+8.6	

General election 2010: Feltham and Heston
Party	Candidate	Votes	%	±%
Labour Co-op	Alan Keen	21,174	43.6	−4.7
Conservative	Mark Bowen	16,516	34.0	+5.3
Liberal Democrats	Munira Wilson	6,669	13.7	−2.9
BNP	John Donnelly	1,714	3.5	New
UKIP	Jerry Shadbolt	992	2.0	+0.5
Green	Elizabeth Anstis	530	1.1	−1.2
Independent	Dharmendra Tripathi	505	1.0	New
Independent	Asa Khaira	180	0.4	New
Independent	Roger Williams	168	0.3	New
Workers Revolutionary	Matthew Linley	78	0.2	New
Majority		4,658	9.6	−10.1
Turnout		48,536	59.9	+10.1
Registered electors		81,058		
Labour Co-op hold		Swing	−5.0	

=== Elections in the 2000s ===
2005 notional result
Party	Vote	%
Labour	19,308	48.4
Conservative	11,457	28.7
Liberal Democrats	6,660	16.7
Others	2,483	6.2
Turnout	39,908	49.8
Electorate	80,206	

General election 2005: Feltham and Heston
Party	Candidate	Votes	%	±%
Labour Co-op	Alan Keen	17,741	47.6	−11.6
Conservative	Mark Bowen	10,921	29.3	+5.1
Liberal Democrats	Satnam Kaur Khalsa	6,177	16.6	+2.8
National Front	Graham Kemp	975	2.6	New
Green	Elizabeth Anstis	815	2.2	New
UKIP	Leon S. Mullett	612	1.6	New
Independent	Warwick Prachar	41	0.1	−0.4
Majority		6,820	18.3	−16.7
Turnout		37,282	48.7	+0.1
Registered electors		76,531		
Labour Co-op hold		Swing	−8.3	

General election 2001: Feltham and Heston
Party	Candidate	Votes	%	±%
Labour Co-op	Alan Keen	21,406	59.2	−0.5
Conservative	Hazel Mammatt	8,749	24.2	−2.8
Liberal Democrats	Andrew S. Darley	4,998	13.8	+4.7
Socialist Labour	Surinder Cheema	651	1.8	New
Independent	Warwick Prachar	204	0.6	New
Independent	Asa Singh Khaira	169	0.5	New
Majority		12,657	35.0	+2.2
Turnout		36,177	48.6	−16.3
Registered electors		74,458		
Labour Co-op hold		Swing	+1.1	

=== Elections in the 1990s ===
General election 1997: Feltham and Heston
Party	Candidate	Votes	%	±%
Labour Co-op	Alan Keen	27,836	59.7	+14.2
Conservative	Patrick Ground	12,563	26.9	−15.9
Liberal Democrats	Colin D. Penning	4,264	9.1	−2.4
Referendum	Rupert A. Stubbs	1,099	2.4	New
BNP	Robert Church	682	1.5	New
Natural Law	David J. Fawcett	177	0.4	New
Majority		15,273	32.8	+30.1
Turnout		46,621	64.9	–7.9
Registered electors		71,868		
Labour Co-op hold		Swing	+15.1	

1992 notional result
Party	Vote	%
Labour	24,294	45.5
Conservative	22,894	42.9
Liberal Democrats	6,189	11.6
Turnout	53,377	72.8
Electorate	73,296	

General election 1992: Feltham and Heston
Party	Candidate	Votes	%	±%
Labour Co-op	Alan Keen	27,660	46.1	+8.7
Conservative	Patrick Ground	25,665	42.8	−3.7
Liberal Democrats	Michael F. Hoban	6,700	11.2	−4.9
Majority		1,995	3.3	N/A
Turnout		60,025	73.9	+0.3
Registered electors		81,221		
Labour Co-op gain from Conservative		Swing	+6.2	

=== Elections in the 1980s ===
General election 1987: Feltham and Heston
Party	Candidate	Votes	%	±%
Conservative	Patrick Ground	27,755	46.5	+3.1
Labour	Charles Hinds	22,325	37.4	−2.0
SDP	James Daly	9,623	16.1	+0.2
Majority		5,430	9.1	+5.2
Turnout		59,703	73.7	+3.8
Registered electors		81,062		
Conservative hold		Swing	+2.6	

General election 1983: Feltham and Heston
Party	Candidate	Votes	%	±%
Conservative	Patrick Ground	23,724	43.4	+2.0
Labour	Russell Kerr	21,576	39.4	−8.9
Liberal	Alex V. Alagappa	8,706	15.9	+7.4
National Front	Stuart A. Glass	696	1.3	−0.2
Majority		2,148	3.9	N/A
Turnout		54,702	69.8	−4.5
Registered electors		78,366		
Conservative gain from Labour		Swing	+5.4	

=== Elections in the 1970s ===
General election 1979: Feltham and Heston
Party	Candidate	Votes	%	±%
Labour	Russell Kerr	28,675	48.3	−1.3
Conservative	Patrick Ground	24,570	41.4	+8.8
Liberal	Barry Norcott	5,051	8.5	−5.6
National Front	Josephine Reid	898	1.5	−2.2
Workers Revolutionary	Richard Lugg	168	0.3	New
Majority		4,105	6.9	–10.1
Turnout		59,362	74.3	+6.4
Registered electors		79,873		
Labour hold		Swing	–5.1	

General election October 1974: Feltham and Heston
Party	Candidate	Votes	%	±%
Labour	Russell Kerr	26,611	49.6	+4.2
Conservative	Patrick Ground	17,464	32.6	+0.4
Liberal	J.A. Quinn	7,554	14.1	−4.0
National Front	Josephine Reid	1,984	3.7	−0.7
Majority		9,147	17.1	+3.8
Turnout		53,613	67.9	−9.5
Registered electors		78,983		
Labour hold		Swing	+1.9	

General election February 1974: Feltham and Heston
Party	Candidate	Votes	%	±%
Labour	Russell Kerr	27,519	45.4	–3.9
Conservative	Patrick Ground	19,464	32.1	–9.9
Liberal	J.A. Quinn	10,952	18.1	+9.5
National Front	Josephine Reid	2,653	4.4	New
Majority		8,055	13.3	+6.0
Turnout		60,588	77.4	+9.3
Registered electors		78,260		
Labour hold		Swing	+3.0	

1970 notional result
Party	Vote	%
Labour	25,800	49.3
Conservative	22,000	42.1
Liberal	4,500	8.6
Turnout	52,300	68.1
Electorate	76,832	

== See also ==
- Parliamentary constituencies in London
