= Seema Malhotra =

British politician (born 1972)

Seema Malhotra MP
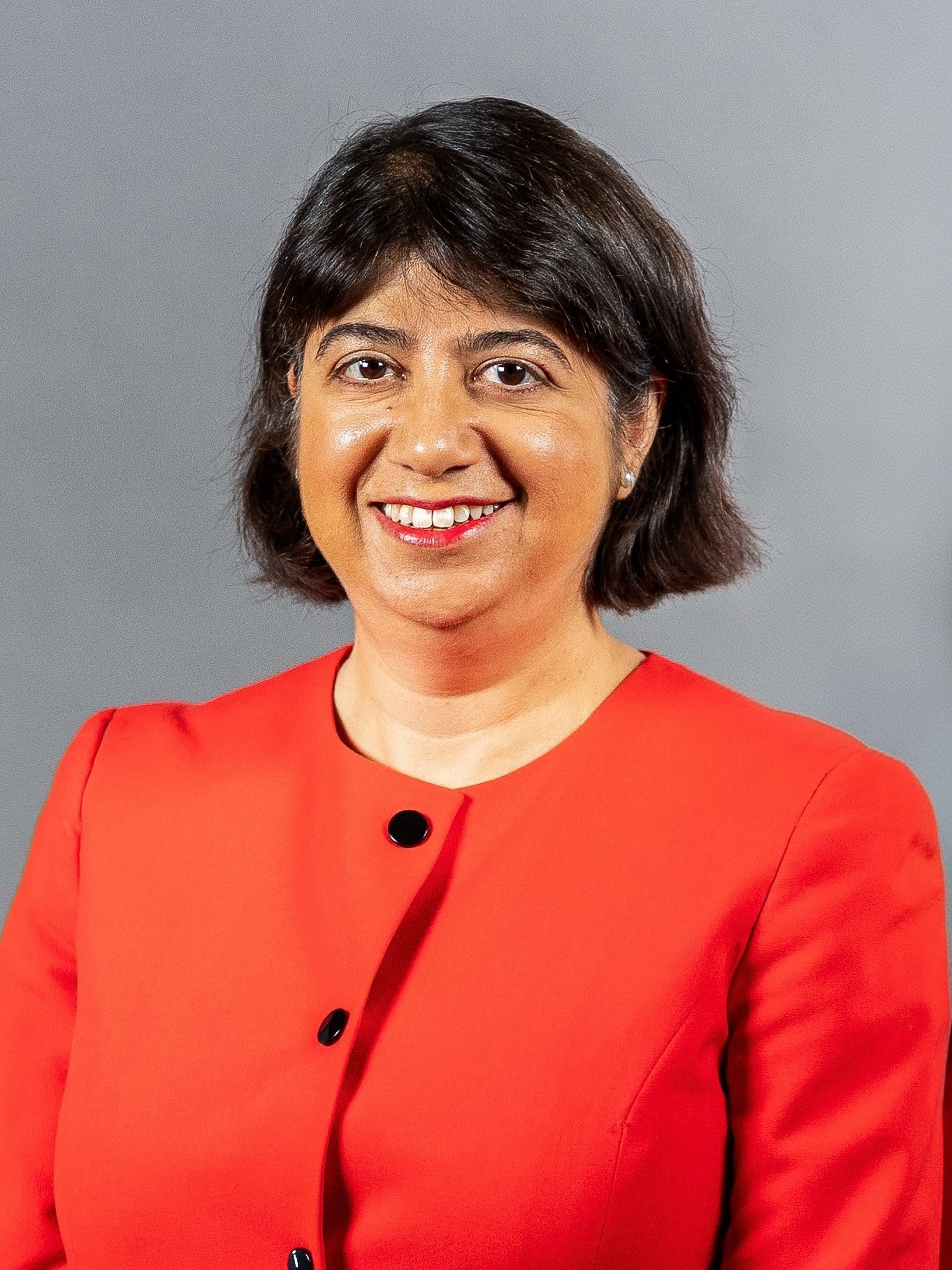
- Official portrait, 2024

Parliamentary Under-Secretary of State for Indo-Pacific
- In office 6 September 2025 – 22 July 2026
- Prime Minister: Keir Starmer
- Preceded by: Catherine West
- Succeeded by: The Baroness Winterton of Doncaster

Parliamentary Under-Secretary of State for Equalities
- In office 8 October 2024 – 22 July 2026
- Prime Minister: Keir Starmer
- Preceded by: Stuart Andrew
- Succeeded by: Satvir Kaur

Parliamentary Under-Secretary of State for Migration and Citizenship
- In office 9 July 2024 – 6 September 2025
- Prime Minister: Keir Starmer
- Preceded by: Tom Pursglove (Legal Migration and Border)
- Succeeded by: Mike Tapp
Shadow portfolios
Shadow Cabinet portfolios
2015-2016	Shadow Chief Secretary to the Treasury
Junior Shadow portfolios
2023-2024	Shadow Minister for Skills
2021–2023	Shadow Minister for Business and Consumers
2020-2021	Shadow Minister for Employment
2014-2015	Shadow Minister for Preventing Violence Against Women and Girls

Member of Parliament for Feltham and Heston
- Incumbent
- Assumed office 15 December 2011
- Preceded by: Alan Keen
- Majority: 7,944 (20.4%)

Personal details
- Born: 7 August 1972 (age 54) Hammersmith, London, England
- Party: Labour Co-op
- Spouse: Sushil Saluja (m. 2005)
- Education: University of Warwick (BA); Aston University (MSc)
- Website: Official website

Seema Malhotra (born 7 August 1972) is a British politician who served as Parliamentary Under-Secretary of State for Equalities from 2024 to 2026, and as Parliamentary Under-Secretary of State for Indo-Pacific since 2025. A member of Labour Co-op, she has been the Member of Parliament (MP) for Feltham and Heston since 2011. Malhotra previously sat on the opposition front bench as the Shadow Chief Secretary to the Treasury from 2015 to 2016.

== Early career ==
One of five children of Sushil Kumar Malhotra (1941–2014), of Osterley, a shop owner, formerly a financial adviser and an engineer, and his wife Usha, Malhotra was educated at schools in the London Borough of Hounslow, studied politics and philosophy at the University of Warwick and took a postgraduate degree in business and information studies at Aston University.

Of Indian Punjabi Hindu descent, Malhotra is a former management consultant who worked for Accenture and PriceWaterhouseCoopers. She founded the Fabian Women's Network, and was a previous national chair of the Young Fabians.

Malhotra was the Labour candidate for the South West constituency in the 2004 London Assembly elections, coming third with 17% of the vote.

While Labour was in government before 2010, she worked as an adviser to Liam Byrne and Ian Austin when they were regional ministers for the West Midlands. Following Gordon Brown's resignation as Labour leader in the wake of the 2010 general election, she was the special adviser to Harriet Harman during her tenure as Leader of the Labour Party.

== Parliamentary career ==
Malhotra entered Parliament in December 2011, on a majority of 6,203 in the Feltham and Heston by-election, which increased in 2015 and in 2017, to reach 15,603 votes.

In August 2014, Ed Miliband appointed Malhotra to the newly created role of Shadow Minister for Preventing Violence Against Women and Girls. The role earmarked Malhotra to be among Labour's Home Office ministers if the party became elected to power. In this she took up identifying problems, finding solutions and reviewing funding decisions as to crime prevention, prosecution and victim support in cases of rape, sexual assault, domestic violence, female genital mutilation, forced marriage, prostitution and trafficking.

On 13 September 2015, Malhotra was appointed Shadow Chief Secretary to the Treasury in Jeremy Corbyn's shadow cabinet. On 26 June 2016, Malhotra resigned from the shadow cabinet over the leadership, along with dozens of other shadow ministers. She supported Owen Smith in his failed bid to replace Corbyn in the 2016 Labour Party (UK) leadership election.

Following her resignation, Malhotra formally complained to the Speaker of the House of Commons about aides to Corbyn and McDonnell gaining unauthorised access to her office after her resignation and "harassment" of her staff. John McDonnell's explanation was that the office was a shadow Treasury team office which Malhotra was moving out of, and his office manager who was a key holder, after seeing boxes outside, went in to check if it was now empty. After an investigation, the Speaker concluded there was no information which justified regarding the events as a possible breach of Parliamentary privilege.

In 2017, Malhotra set up a local charity, Hounslow's Promise, to give local children the best possible start in life, which she continues to run.

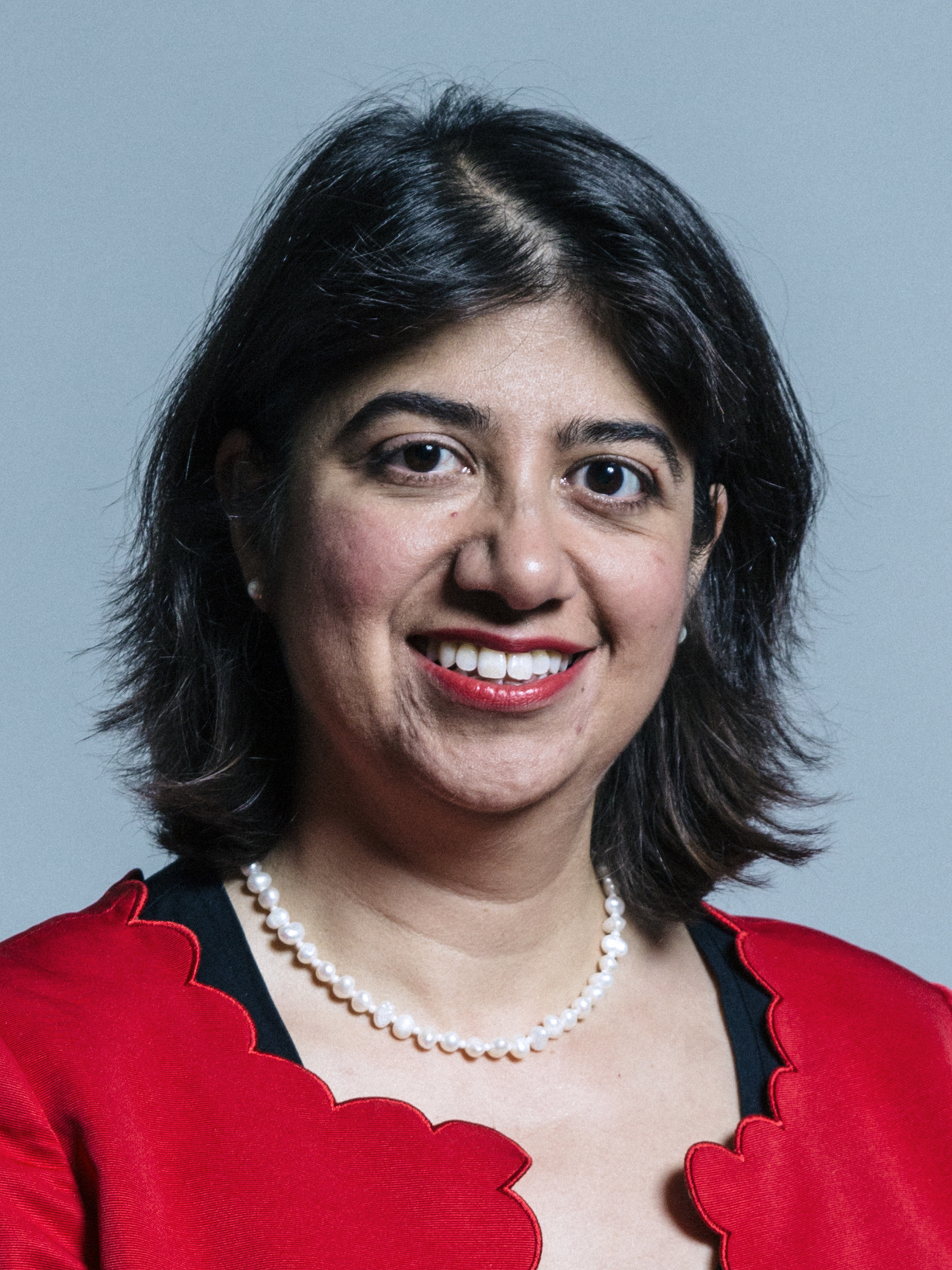
2017 MP portrait of Seema Malhotra

In June 2018, Malhotra voted in favour of the National Policy Statement: Airports which laid out government support for a third runway, and was not among the 28 of 46 London Labour MPs opposing the runway.

Following Keir Starmer's election as Labour leader in April 2020, Malhotra returned to the front bench as the shadow minister for employment in the shadow work and pensions team. In this role, she highlighted the impact of Covid-19 lockdown on aviation communities. In addition, she convened a "Blue Skies" conference to secure the future of West London's aviation sector and "to draw up an ambitious and far-sighted blueprint for the future of aviation." She continues to co-chair the London West Innovation District, which aims to produce innovation clusters in West London for aviation, creative industries, and tech.

She was appointed as the Shadow Minister for Business and Consumers in the minor May 2021 reshuffle, succeeding Lucy Powell in the role. In the 2023 British shadow cabinet reshuffle, she was appointed Shadow Minister for Skills and Further Education.

She was appointed Minister for Migration and Citizenship following Labour's victory in the July 2024 election. On 10 September 2024 she announced the imposition of a visa requirement for Jordanian citizens to enter the UK, in order to prevent refugees from that country from claiming asylum.

She is a vice president of the Fabian Society.

== Personal life ==
Malhotra is married to management consultant and financier Sushil Kumar Saluja, who was Accenture’s Senior Managing Director for Financial Services in Europe, Africa, Middle East, and Latin America, and serves on the board of TheCityUK which is an industry body that promotes financial services in the UK. They live on The Vale, Chelsea in a property valued at £9,775,000.

Prior to serving as an MP, it was reported that Malhotra used the name 'Malhotra-Suma'; the 2017 Election poll results state her name to be 'Seema Malhotra-Saluja (known as Seema Malhotra)'.

Party political offices
Preceded by Eric Joyce	Chair of the Fabian Society; 2005–2006	Succeeded by Ed Balls
Preceded by Jessica Asato	Chair of the Fabian Society; 2014–2016	Succeeded by Kate Green
Preceded by Howard Dawber	Chair of the Young Fabians; 1999–2000	Succeeded by Mari Williams
Parliament of the United Kingdom
Preceded by Alan Keen	Member of Parliament for Feltham and Heston; 2011–present	Incumbent
Political offices
Preceded by Shabana Mahmood	Shadow Chief Secretary to the Treasury; 2015–2016	Succeeded by Rebecca Long-Bailey
