= St Mary's Church, Osterley =

Church in Osterley, London, England

Coordinates: 51.48113°N 0.34345°W

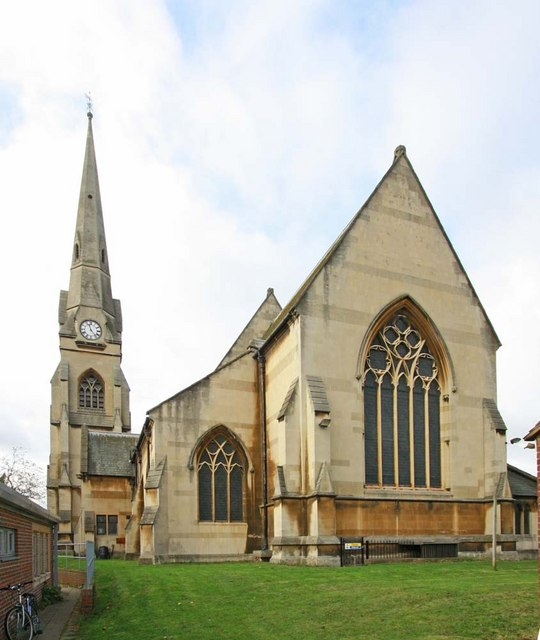

St Mary's Church, Osterley is a Church of England church on Osterley Road in Osterley, London Borough of Hounslow.

Designed by John Taylor the Younger in a Neo-Gothic imitation of the Decorated style it was funded by Henry Daniel Davies, who built its Spring Grove estate of generally large houses, now a more mixed housing neighbourhood, in which the early low-density large houses have mostly been subdivided and significant infill housing has been built including blocks of flats.

In 1855 it was said that when the church was opened it would be "placed at the disposal of an able and evangelical minister" and has remained in that churchmanship ever since. The church was consecrated and was assigned a parish taken from the ancient parish of Isleworth later the same year. Young designed it as it stands with light stone facings concealing bricks and with two tiers of stone-mullioned (split), wide, pointed arch windows in the central nave particularly for galleries – never needed nor added. The pillared, vaulted nave has stained-glass windows by Heaton, Butler and Bayne and an offset, spired belfry clocktower. The church has a tall pipe organ, bright suspended lighting, and a high altar beneath a tall stone-mullioned window.

In 1875 the parish's living was valued at £459. Davies remained patron of the parish for several years. Its advowson passed to the Church Patronage Society around 1897 Notable events include the 1899 marriage of Sofia Dalgairns (Sofia Stanley), future head of the Metropolitan Police's first Women Patrols. The living was valued at £859 net in 1955–1956. In 1959 a new vicar began a Sunday parish communion service at 9:30 whilst continuing matins at 11, at which time the parish's electoral roll totalled 506. It now forms part of the parish of St Mary's with St Luke's, the latter having opened on Kingsley Road as a Sunday school before 1895 before becoming its mission church (a church of lesser status than its parish church). St Luke's is next to Hounslow East tube station and runs a weekly gardening drop-in project and clothes bank.
