= Feltham (constituency) =

Parliamentary constituency in the United Kingdom, 1955–1974

- Former borough constituency for the House of Commons
- The Feltham seat in Middlesex: its boundaries during the seat's existence.

1955–February 1974
- Created from: Heston and Isleworth (part of) and Spelthorne (part of)
- Replaced by: Feltham and Heston

Map that gives each named seat and any constant electoral success for national (Westminster) elections for Middlesex, 1955 to 1974.

Feltham was a constituency, between 1955 and 1974, of the House of Commons of the UK Parliament. It was used for five general elections and at each election returned the candidate of the Labour Party.

== Boundaries ==
Components
1955—1974: The Urban District of Feltham (Feltham, Bedfont and Hanworth), and the Borough of Heston and Isleworth wards of Cranford and Hounslow Heath (as to "Cranford" being the more populous eastern half of former parish).

In local government terms the area became the western parts of the London Borough of Hounslow due to the creation of Greater London on 1 April 1965 and formally recited as such ward-by-ward in legislation of 1970.

Geographic context

The constituency was named after Feltham, a late-19th century small town in the west of the administrative county of Middlesex — a county abolished on the further growth of London in 1965. Its areas spread up to 2.5 miles (4.0 km) south and south-east of Heathrow Airport, on a terrain which is near-flat and immediately before the seat's creation rich in market gardening however stony, gravel-rich soil of low agricultural value covered the north and east towards Hounslow Heath. During the seat's existence major industries included gravel works, railway works, aircraft maintenance, repairs and airport ancillary industries, motor sales and repairs, haulage, distribution and small-to-medium scale parts assembly and manufacture.

Predecessor seats

Before 1955 the Urban District of Feltham, in its latter years taking in Feltham, Hanworth and Bedfont, were in the Spelthorne constituency created in 1918; Cranford and Hounslow West (Hounslow Heath) were parts of the Heston and Isleworth constituency, created in 1945.

Successor seat

In the 1974 redistribution the seat was abolished to become the core of the new Feltham and Heston constituency, which added Heston to the north-east and most of the centre of the larger town of Hounslow to the east.

== Members of Parliament ==
Election	Member	Party
1955	Albert Hunter	Labour
1966	Russell Kerr	Labour
Feb 1974	constituency abolished	

The area elected one MP as it post-dated the abolition of the last multi-member constituencies in 1950.

== Elections ==
Results of former UK House of Commons seat Feltham (created 1955, abolished 1974).

=== Elections in the 1950s ===
General election 1955: Feltham
Party	Candidate	Votes	%	±%
Labour	Albert Hunter	21,521	54.2	
Conservative	James A Erskine-Shaw	18,171	45.8	
Majority		3,350	8.4	
Turnout		39,692	78.4	
Registered electors		50,650		
Labour win (new seat)				

General election 1959: Feltham
Party	Candidate	Votes	%	±%
Labour	Albert Hunter	20,320	47.3	−6.9
Conservative	James Brian W Turner	18,070	42.1	−3.7
Liberal	Louis Alfred De Pinna	4,533	10.6	New
Majority		2,250	5.2	−3.2
Turnout		42,923	80.4	+2.0
Registered electors		53,417		
Labour hold		Swing		

=== Elections in the 1960s ===
General election 1964: Feltham
Party	Candidate	Votes	%	±%
Labour	Albert Hunter	20,733	49.6	+2.3
Conservative	James Brian W Turner	14,927	35.7	−6.4
Liberal	Robert Roberts	6,141	14.7	+4.1
Majority		5,806	13.9	+8.7
Turnout		41,801	77.2	−3.2
Registered electors		54,147		
Labour hold		Swing		

General election 1966: Feltham
Party	Candidate	Votes	%	±%
Labour	Russell Kerr	22,389	54.0	+4.4
Conservative	Barbara L Wallis	13,932	33.5	−2.2
Liberal	William G Crauford	5,206	12.5	−2.2
Majority		8,457	20.5	+6.6
Turnout		41,527	77.3	+0.1
Registered electors		53,697		
Labour hold		Swing		

=== Elections in the 1970s ===
General election 1970: Feltham
Party	Candidate	Votes	%	±%
Labour	Russell Kerr	21,561	52.5	−1.5
Conservative	Barbara L Wallis	16,006	38.9	+5.4
Liberal	Geoffrey Roy King	3,536	8.6	−3.9
Majority		5,555	13.6	−6.9
Turnout		41,103	68.2	−9.1
Registered electors		60,273		
Labour hold		Swing		

== See also ==
- List of former United Kingdom Parliament constituencies
