= Richard Reader Harris (Conservative politician) =

British politician (1913–2009)

Richard Reader Harris (4 June 1913 – 7 July 2009) was a British Conservative Party politician. He was member of parliament for Heston and Isleworth from 1950 until 1970.

== Biography ==
Reader Harris was born in Fulham, the son of Richard Reader Harris and Elsie (née Tagen). As a young man the New Democrats, the youth wing of National Labour (supporters of Stanley Baldwin's national government). During the second world war he served as a fireman, eventually rising to the position of general secretary of the National Association of Fire Officers, a post he held until 1963.

He was Chairman of Rolls Razor, which made washing machines. In July 1964 the company went bankrupt, and a subsequent investigation revealed irregularities in the company's accounts. In 1969, Harris was charged with carrying on company business with intent to defraud the company's creditors, falsifying the balance sheet, and deceiving investors as to the company's financial state.

With his trial ongoing as the 1970 general election was called, and despite the judge dismissing two charges, the Heston and Isleworth Conservative Association voted to reject Reader Harris and selected instead Barney Hayhoe. On 29 May, Reader Harris was acquitted on the remaining charge; although time remained for his readoption, the Association stuck to its previous choice.

Reader Harris was married to Pamela Stephens from 1940 until their divorce in 1963; their three daughters survive him. He is also survived by his second wife Una. His son from his second marriage died in 2007.

Harris died on 7 July 2009, aged 96 years.

== See also ==
- John Bloom

Parliament of the United Kingdom
Preceded by William Williams	Member of Parliament for Heston and Isleworth; 1950–1970	Succeeded by Barney Hayhoe
