= Spring Grove, London =

Coordinates: 51.476251°N 0.338924°W

Spring Grove
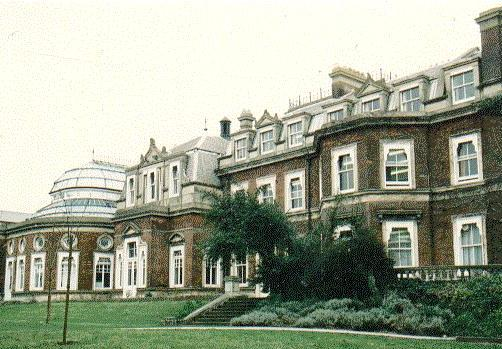
- Spring Grove House in 1988

- Location within Greater London
- London borough: Hounslow
- Ceremonial county: Greater London
- Region: London
- Country: England
- Sovereign state: United Kingdom
- Post town: ISLEWORTH
- Postcode district: TW7
- Dialling code: 020
- Police: Metropolitan
- Fire: London
- Ambulance: London
- UK Parliament: Brentford and Isleworth
- London Assembly: South West

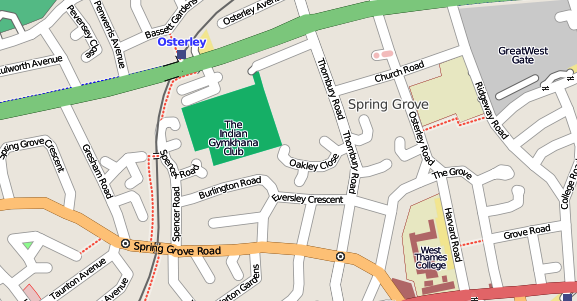
Map of Spring Grove. Click to enlarge

Spring Grove is the north-western district of the town of Isleworth within the Borough of Hounslow in London, England. In general terms it lies east of the district of Lampton; north of the district of Woodlands; west of the Barnes-to-Feltham railway loop line; and south of the district of Osterley. Spring water that rose in the area in the eighteenth century was employed for agricultural and horticultural purposes.

The area is centred around Spring Grove House, the former home of botanist and explorer Sir Joseph Banks, which is now part of West Thames College. In the 1850s-1860s the vision for the area was of a grand Victorian suburb with Italian-style villas designed by John Taylor. Other architectural features include a former college by John Norton & P. E. Massey, and a variety of Arts and Crafts semi-detached houses. Isleworth Crown Court is situated in the Spring Grove area, in a building that was previously a hostel for paraplegics, which was extended in the 1990s.

The prime purpose of Spring Grove in recent centuries appears to have been the gradual provision of residential areas for middle-class communities. Georgian residences appeared first, with large plots of land. With the railway service (Isleworth railway station was formerly called 'Spring Grove & Isleworth') came substantial Victorian property development. During the twentieth century further residential development occurred, and with the turn of the twenty-first century, some of the large villas gave way to modern development of various forms.

The district has over the course of a century or so also embraced a number of large educational establishments, including Brunel University London and West Thames College.

== Politics ==
Spring Grove is part of the Brentford and Isleworth constituency for elections to the House of Commons of the United Kingdom.

Spring Grove is part of the Osterley and Spring Grove ward for elections to Hounslow London Borough Council.

== Gallery ==
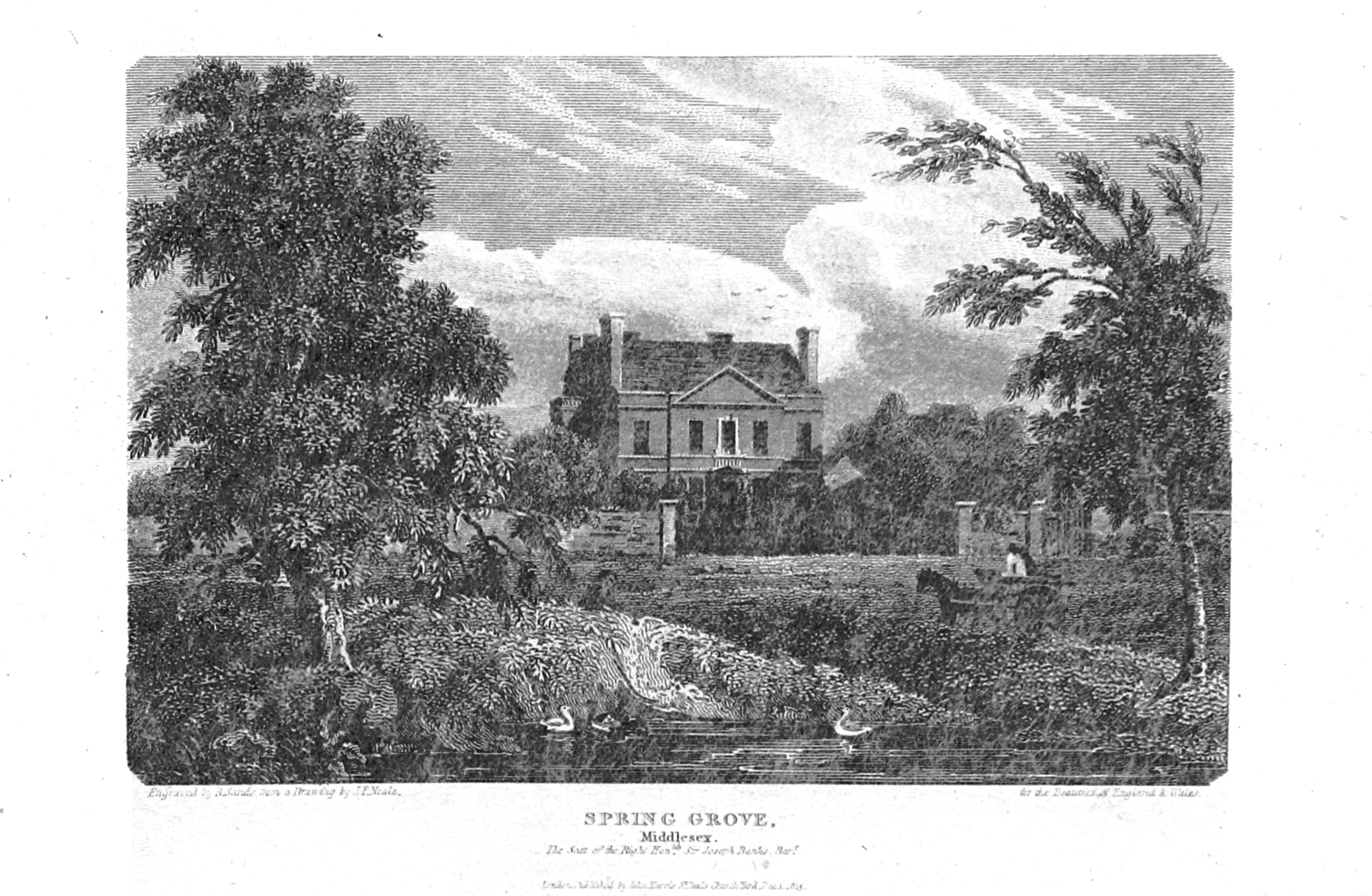
The original Spring Grove house, built in 1645, as it appeared in 1820

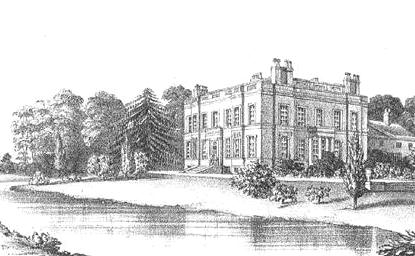
18th century etching of Spring Grove House
