= Woodlands, London =

Coordinates: 51.469568°N 0.337465°W

Woodlands
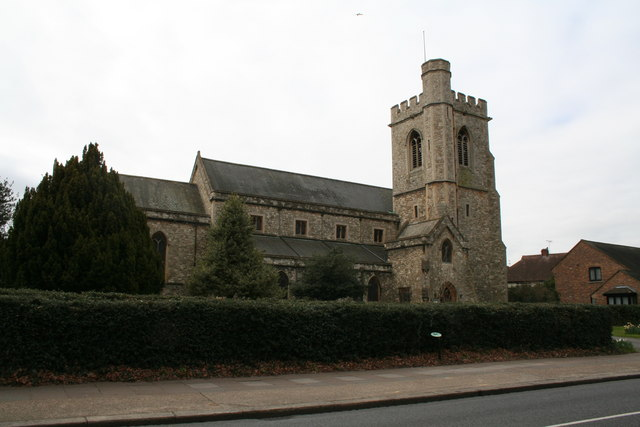
- St John the Baptist Church

- Location within Greater London
- London borough: Hounslow
- Ceremonial county: Greater London
- Region: London
- Country: England
- Sovereign state: United Kingdom
- Post town: ISLEWORTH
- Postcode district: TW7
- Dialling code: 020
- Police: Metropolitan
- Fire: London
- Ambulance: London
- UK Parliament: Brentford & Isleworth
- London Assembly: South West

Woodlands is an area of the London Borough of Hounslow. It is located between Hounslow and Isleworth, and is roughly bounded by the Hounslow Loop Line railway and the London Road to the north, the Duke of Northumberland's River and Twickenham Road to the east, and Bridge Road / Worton Road to the south and south-west. It includes roads such as Woodlands Road, Woodland Gardens, Woodlands Grove as well as The Woodlands Tavern public house and St John the Baptist's Church on St John's Road.

The estate comprises mostly semi-detached houses built in the 1930s, although there are older buildings too. Before these houses were built the area was used as orchards, hence the name 'Woodlands'.

There is an organisation known as the WERFA (Woodlands Estate Resident Freeholders Association) which has a community hall in the small private park in the centre of Woodland Gardens.

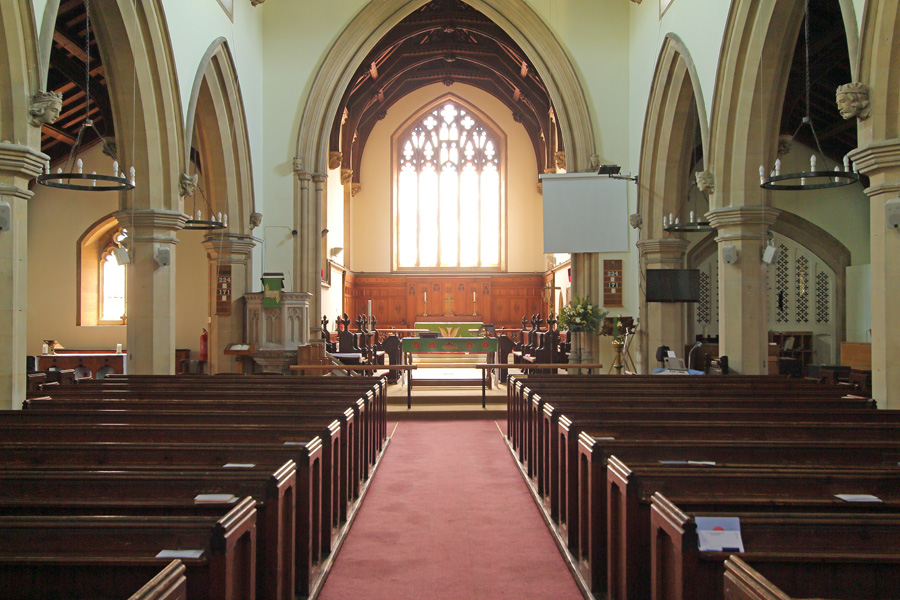
Interior of St John the Baptist Church

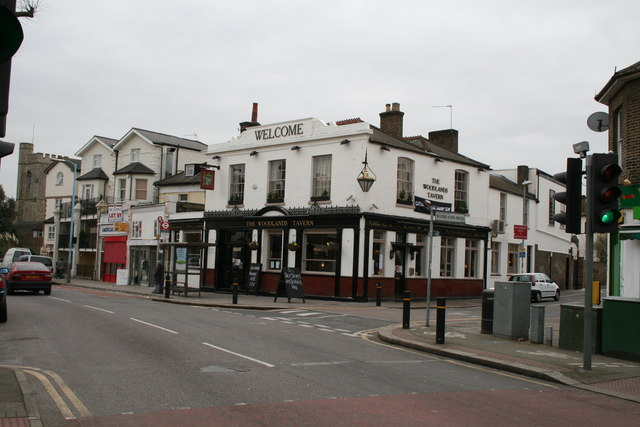
The Woodlands Tavern in 2008
