= 2022 Hounslow London Borough Council election =

2022 local election in Hounslow

2022 Hounslow Council election
- 5 May 2022

All 62 seats on Hounslow Council 32 seats needed for a majority
	First party	Second party
Party	Labour	Conservative
Last election	51 seats, 54.1%	9 seats, 28.8%
Seats won	52	10
Seat change	▲1	▲1
- Map of the results of the 2022 Hounslow council election. Labour in red and Conservatives in blue.
Leader before election
Steve Curran
Labour
Leader after election
Shantanu Rajawat
Labour

The 2022 Hounslow London Borough Council election took place on 5 May 2022. All 62 members of Hounslow London Borough Council were elected. The elections took place alongside local elections in the other London boroughs and elections to local authorities across the United Kingdom.

In the previous election in 2018, the Labour Party maintained its control of the council, winning 51 out of the 60 seats with the Conservative Party forming the council opposition with the remaining nine seats. The 2022 election took place under new election boundaries, which increased the number of councillors to 62.

== Background ==
=== History ===
The thirty-two London boroughs were established in 1965 by the London Government Act 1963. They are the principal authorities in Greater London and have responsibilities including education, housing, planning, highways, social services, libraries, recreation, waste, environmental health and revenue collection. Some of the powers are shared with the Greater London Authority, which also manages passenger transport, police and fire.

Since its formation, Hounslow has generally been under Labour control, apart from a period from 1968–1971 when the Conservative Party held a majority of the seats and a period from 2006–2010 when no party had an overall majority of seats. Labour regained control of the council in the 2010 election, when they won 35 seats with 35.2% of the vote and the Conservatives won 25 seats with 32.0% of the vote. No Liberal Democrats, independents and residents' group councillors were elected in 2010, 2014 or 2018. In the 2018 Hounslow London Borough Council election, Labour extended its majority to win 51 seats with 54.1% of the vote, while the Conservatives won the remaining 9 seats, all in Chiswick, with 28.8% of the vote across the borough. The Liberal Democrats won 8.1% of the vote and the Green Party won 7.8% of the vote, but neither party won any seats.

=== Council term ===
A Labour councillor for Heston West, Rajinder Bath, died in June 2019. He had been first elected in 1990 and had served as mayor in 1998. The former council leader and sitting Labour councillor for the Feltham North ward, John Chatt, died in August 2019. He had served as a councillor for twenty-nine years. By-elections to fill both seats were held on 12 December 2019 to coincide with the 2019 general election. Bath's seat of Heston West was won by the Labour candidate Balraj Sarai, while the Conservative Party candidate Kuldeep Tak gained Chatt's seat in Feltham North. A Labour councillor for Hounslow Heath, Hina Kiani, resigned in July 2020 for work reasons. The Labour councillor for Cranford ward, Poonam Dhillon died in January 2021. She had represented the ward since 2006–2014 and was re-elected in 2018. Due to the COVID-19 pandemic, by-elections for both seats were delayed until 6 May 2021, alongside the 2021 London mayoral election and the London Assembly election. Hounslow Heath was held for Labour by Madeeha Asim, while Cranford ward was held for Labour by Devina Ram, with the Conservatives coming in second place in both wards.

As with most London boroughs, Hounslow elected its councillors under new boundaries decided by the Local Government Boundary Commission for England, which it produced after a period of consultation. The number of councillors rose to 62, an increase from the previous 60, across eighteen three-councillor wards and four two-councillor wards.

== Campaign ==
Darius Nasimi, who came to the United Kingdom as an Afghan refugee in 1999, was selected as a Conservative candidate for Hanworth. The Labour councillor Theo Dennison resigned from his party after his motion of no confidence in council leader Steve Curran failed. Curran later announced he would not be seeking re-election due to illness.

== Electoral process ==
Hounslow, like other London borough councils, elects all of its councillors at once every four years. The previous election took place in 2018. The election took place by multi-member first-past-the-post voting, with each ward being represented by two or three councillors. Electors had as many votes as there are councillors to be elected in their ward, with the top two or three being elected.

All registered electors (British, Irish, Commonwealth and European Union citizens) living in London aged 18 or over were entitled to vote in the election. People who lived at two addresses in different councils, such as university students with different term-time and holiday addresses, were entitled to be registered for and vote in elections in both local authorities. Voting in-person at polling stations took place from 7:00 to 22:00 on election day, and voters were able to apply for postal votes or proxy votes in advance of the election.

== Previous council composition ==
After 2018 election		Before 2022 election	
Party	Seats	Party	Seats
Labour	51	Labour	48
Conservative	9	Conservative	10
Independent	0	Independent	2

== Results summary ==
2022 Hounslow London Borough Council election
Party	Seats	Gains	Losses	Net gain/loss	Seats %	Votes %	Votes	+/−
Labour	52	1	1	▲1	83.9	53.8	94,667	-0.3
Conservative	10	1	1	▲1	16.1	30.8	54,139	+2.0
Green	0	0	0	0	0.0	7.2	12,685	-0.6
Liberal Democrats	0	0	0	0	0.0	6.4	11,252	-1.7
Independent	0	0	0	0	0.0	0.9	1,537	+0.1

== Ward results ==
=== Bedfont ===
Bedfont (3)
Party	Candidate	Votes	%	±%
Labour	Lily Bath	1,768	55.1	
Labour	Adesh Farmahan	1,663	51.8	
Labour	Raghwinder Siddhu	1,627	50.7	
Conservative	Peter Edwards	1,245	38.8	
Conservative	John Osborn	1,162	36.7	
Conservative	Hareshkumar Bhalsod	999	31.1	
Green	Dave Wetzel	429	13.3	
Turnout		3,211	31.8	
Labour hold		Swing		
Labour hold		Swing		
Labour hold		Swing		

=== Brentford East ===
Brentford East (2)
Party	Candidate	Votes	%	±%
Labour	Rhys Williams	1,058	66.7	
Labour	Marina Sharma	994	62.7	
Conservative	Thomas Hearn	314	19.9	
Green	Freya Summersgill	312	19.7	
Conservative	Paul Baksh	271	17.1	
Turnout		1,586	28.5	
Labour win (new seat)				
Labour win (new seat)				

=== Brentford West ===
Brentford West (2)
Party	Candidate	Votes	%	±%
Labour	Guy Lambert	1,183	51.8	
Labour	Lara Parizotto	1,119	49.0	
Green	Stephen Clark	669	29.3	
Conservative	Michael Denniss	410	17.9	
Conservative	Zoe Nixon	392	17.2	
Green	Tony Firkins	367	16.1	
Independent	Bob Ayres	226	9.9	
Turnout		2,285	36.06	
Labour win (new seat)				
Labour win (new seat)				

=== Chiswick Gunnersbury ===
Chiswick Gunnersbury (3)
Party	Candidate	Votes	%	±%
Conservative	Joanna Biddolph	1,552	42.6	
Conservative	Ron Mushiso	1,402	38.5	
Conservative	Ranjit Gill	1,382	37.9	
Labour	Emma Yates	1,359	37.3	
Labour	Uday Nagaraju	1,215	33.3	
Labour	Hanif Khan	1,210	33.2	
Liberal Democrats	William Francis	840	23.0	
Liberal Democrats	Helen Cross	803	22.0	
Liberal Democrats	Johanna Guppy	657	18.0	
Turnout		3,645		
Conservative win (new seat)				
Conservative win (new seat)				
Conservative win (new seat)				

=== Chiswick Homefields ===
Chiswick Homefields (3)
Party	Candidate	Votes	%	±%
Conservative	John Todd	1,884	43.8	
Conservative	Gerald Mcgregor	1,849	43.0	
Conservative	Jack Emsley	1,746	40.6	
Labour	Olivia Uwechue	1,277	29.7	
Labour	Saroosh Khan	1,251	29.1	
Labour	Mukesh Malhotra	1,213	28.2	
Liberal Democrats	James Charrington	646	15.0	
Liberal Democrats	Mark Cripps	627	14.6	
Green	Martin Bleach	600	14.0	
Liberal Democrats	Leigh Edwards	585	13.6	
Green	Astrid Hilne	488	11.3	
Green	Jonathan Elkon	455	10.6	
Turnout		4,301		
Conservative hold		Swing		
Conservative hold		Swing		
Conservative hold		Swing		

=== Chiswick Riverside ===
Chiswick Riverside (3)
Party	Candidate	Votes	%	±%
Conservative	Gabriella Giles	1,105	37.9	
Conservative	Peter Thompson	1,087	37.3	
Labour	Amy Croft	1,064	36.5	
Conservative	Sebastian Wallace	1,055	36.2	
Labour	Gurbachan Athwal	948	32.5	
Labour	Melvin Collins	926	31.8	
Green	Andrea Black	513	17.6	
Liberal Democrats	Charles Rees	485	16.6	
Liberal Democrats	Guy De Boursac	458	15.7	
Green	Elly Lewis-holmes	455	15.6	
Green	Bill Hagerty	362	12.4	
Turnout		2,913		
Conservative hold		Swing		
Conservative hold		Swing		
Labour gain from Conservative		Swing		

=== Cranford ===
Cranford (3)
Party	Candidate	Votes	%	±%
Labour	Sukhbir Dhaliwal	1,949	60.2	
Labour	Vickram Grewal	1,942	60.0	
Labour	Ghazala Butt	1,843	57.0	
Conservative	Vaibhav Mistry	698	21.6	
Conservative	Sheekeba Nasimi	690	21.3	
Conservative	Mohamad Jarche	608	18.8	
Green	Gurpal Sindhar	519	16.0	
Independent	Gurpal Virdi	489	15.1	
Turnout		3,235		
Labour hold		Swing		
Labour hold		Swing		
Labour hold		Swing		

=== Feltham North ===
Feltham North (3)
Party	Candidate	Votes	%	±%
Labour	Samina Nagra	1,288	46.2	
Conservative	Kuldeep Tak	1,276	45.8	
Labour	Muhammad Akram	1,244	44.6	
Conservative	Nimmi Madadi	1,225	43.9	
Labour	Tariq Mehmood	1,186	42.5	
Conservative	Zubair Awan	1,172	42.0	
Green	Chantel Wetzel	431	15.5	
Turnout		2,789		
Labour hold		Swing		
Conservative gain from Labour		Swing		
Labour hold		Swing		

=== Feltham West ===
Feltham West (3)
Party	Candidate	Votes	%	±%
Labour	Alan Mitchell	1,752	58.1	
Labour	Madeeha Asim	1,567	52.0	
Labour	Hina Mir	1,557	51.7	
Conservative	Manoj Srirangam	1,000	33.2	
Conservative	Sonia Luther	997	33.1	
Conservative	Vanita Kanda	970	32.2	
Green	Christina Ellis	501	16.6	
Turnout		3,013		
Labour hold		Swing		
Labour hold		Swing		
Labour hold		Swing		

=== Hanworth Park ===
Hanworth Park (2)
Party	Candidate	Votes	%	±%
Labour	Bishnu Gurung	1,037	48.2	
Labour	Farah Kamran	983	45.7	
Conservative	Ran Maliyadde	769	35.8	
Conservative	Adamya Raj	649	30.2	
Green	Tom Beaton	318	14.8	
Liberal Democrats	Liz Trayhorn	282	13.1	
Turnout		2,150		
Labour hold		Swing		
Labour hold		Swing		

=== Hanworth Village ===
Hanworth Village (3)
Party	Candidate	Votes	%	±%
Labour	Richard Foote	1,675	49.9	
Labour	Noreen Kaleem	1,475	43.9	
Conservative	Allan Joseph	1,434	42.7	
Labour	Naeem Ulfat	1,419	42.3	
Conservative	Darius Nasimi	1,373	40.9	
Conservative	Srinivasa Aripirala	1,306	38.9	
Green	Damian Read	595	17.7	
Turnout		3,358		
Labour win (new seat)				
Labour win (new seat)				
Conservative win (new seat)				

=== Heston Central ===
Heston Central (3)
Party	Candidate	Votes	%	±%
Labour	Shivraj Grewal	1,957	65.8	
Labour	Harleen Hear	1,775	59.7	
Labour	Muhammad Gull	1,648	55.4	
Conservative	Sandra Cullinane	724	24.3	
Conservative	Nooralhaq Nasimi	489	16.4	
Green	Tony Browne	471	15.8	
Liberal Democrats	Chaitan Shah	450	15.1	
Conservative	Mohammed Shaikh	403	13.5	
Turnout		2,975		
Labour hold		Swing		
Labour hold		Swing		
Labour hold		Swing		

=== Heston East ===
Heston East (3)
Party	Candidate	Votes	%	±%
Labour	Gurmail Lal	1,491	61.4	
Labour	Amritpal Mann	1,415	58.3	
Labour	Aqsa Ahmed	1,288	53.0	
Conservative	Sonia Dhiman	721	29.7	
Conservative	Hari Borpatla	666	27.4	
Conservative	Krish Pisavadia	648	26.7	
Green	Zbynek Simcik	340	14.0	
Turnout		2,429		
Labour hold		Swing		
Labour hold		Swing		
Labour hold		Swing		

=== Heston West ===
Heston West (3)
Party	Candidate	Votes	%	±%
Labour	Adriana Gheorghe	1,998	69.2	
Labour	Shantanu Rajawat	1,906	66.0	
Labour	Karamat Malik	1,768	61.3	
Conservative	Swarnjit Kamboh	637	22.1	
Conservative	Maha Jarche	553	19.2	
Conservative	Muhammad Anwar	550	19.1	
Green	Ann Thomas	475	16.5	
Turnout		2,886		
Labour hold		Swing		
Labour hold		Swing		
Labour hold		Swing		

=== Hounslow Central ===
Hounslow Central (3)
Party	Candidate	Votes	%	±%
Labour	Pritam Grewal	1,217	59.7	
Labour	Ajmer Grewal	1,166	57.2	
Labour	Rasheed Bhatti	1,144	56.1	
Conservative	Hetal Kataria	618	30.3	
Conservative	Nimit Shishodia	573	28.1	
Conservative	Shumaila Ali	542	26.6	
Green	Katharine Hollingworth-Kandelaki	384	18.8	
Turnout		2,039		
Labour hold		Swing		
Labour hold		Swing		
Labour hold		Swing		

=== Hounslow East ===
Hounslow East (2)
Party	Candidate	Votes	%	±%
Labour	Junue Meah	1,065	53.9	
Labour	Daanish Saeed	1,035	52.4	
Conservative	Jesal Patel	642	32.5	
Conservative	Jignesh Patel	632	32.0	
Green	Mary-Ellen Archer	373	18.9	
Turnout		1,975		
Labour win (new seat)				
Labour win (new seat)				

=== Hounslow Heath ===
Hounslow Heath (3)
Party	Candidate	Votes	%	±%
Labour	Samia Chaudhary	2,175	58.6	
Labour	Afzaal Kiani	1,934	52.1	
Labour	Farhaan Rehman	1,841	49.6	
Conservative	Satvinder Buttar	1,028	27.7	
Conservative	Nada Jarche	742	20.0	
Conservative	Sana Jarche	740	20.0	
Liberal Democrats	Sally Billenness	708	19.1	
Green	Stefan Wells	576	15.5	
Liberal Democrats	Warwick Francis	540	14.6	
Turnout		3,709		
Labour hold		Swing		
Labour hold		Swing		
Labour hold		Swing		

=== Hounslow South ===
Hounslow South (3)
Party	Candidate	Votes	%	±%
Labour	Tom Bruce	2,279	62.6	
Labour	Karen Smith	2,024	55.6	
Labour	Sayyar Raza	1,770	48.6	
Conservative	Laura Elliott	1,122	30.8	
Conservative	Ekansh Sharma	930	25.5	
Conservative	Muraad Chaudhry	866	23.8	
Green	Michael Bull	674	18.5	
Liberal Democrats	Krishna Valluru	520	14.3	
Turnout		3,643		
Labour hold		Swing		
Labour hold		Swing		
Labour hold		Swing		

=== Hounslow West ===
Hounslow West (3)
Party	Candidate	Votes	%	±%
Labour	Bandna Chopra	2,112	63.1	
Labour	Jagdish Sharma	2,002	59.8	
Labour	Mohammed Umair	1,819	54.3	
Conservative	Ranveer Summan	837	25.0	
Conservative	Sudhakar Bhumana	765	22.8	
Conservative	Wafa Khider	618	18.5	
Liberal Democrats	Carl Pierce	494	14.8	
Green	Sergejs Adamovs	490	14.6	
Turnout		3,348		
Labour hold		Swing		
Labour hold		Swing		
Labour hold		Swing		

=== Isleworth ===
Isleworth (3)
Party	Candidate	Votes	%	±%
Labour	Sue Sampson	2,124	61.4	
Labour	Salman Shaheen	1,832	53.0	
Labour	John Stroud-Turp	1,672	48.4	
Liberal Democrats	Robert Thorpe	855	24.7	
Green	David Juritz	697	20.2	
Liberal Democrats	Joseph Bourke	669	19.3	
Conservative	Al Al-ayoby	622	18.0	
Conservative	Muhammad Awais	606	17.5	
Conservative	Khalid Warsame	593	17.1	
Turnout		3,458		
Labour hold		Swing		
Labour hold		Swing		
Labour hold		Swing		

=== Osterley & Spring Grove ===
Osterley & Spring Grove (3)
Party	Candidate	Votes	%	±%
Labour	Tony Louki	2,116	60.1	
Labour	Unsa Chaudri	1,751	49.7	
Labour	Aftab Siddiqui	1,640	46.6	
Conservative	Jason Harcourt	1,105	31.4	
Conservative	Sukhy Bahia	1,048	29.8	
Conservative	Maneesh Singh	982	27.9	
Green	Rashid Wahab	566	16.1	
Liberal Democrats	Judith Kowalczyk	565	16.0	
Turnout		3,521		
Labour hold		Swing		
Labour hold		Swing		
Labour hold		Swing		

=== Syon & Brentford Lock ===
Syon & Brentford Lock (3)
Party	Candidate	Votes	%	±%
Labour	Katherine Dunne	1,463	52.8	
Labour	Dan Bowring	1,368	49.4	
Labour	Balraj Sarai	1,080	39.0	
Independent	Theo Dennison	822	29.7	
Green	Anthony Agius	625	22.6	
Conservative	Adam Ali	573	20.7	
Conservative	Chaitan Sinha	542	19.6	
Liberal Democrats	Phyllis Van der Esch	391	14.1	
Liberal Democrats	Christopher Gillie	363	13.1	
Liberal Democrats	Jack Ballentyne	314	11.3	
Turnout		2,770		
Labour win (new seat)				
Labour win (new seat)				
Labour win (new seat)				

== Changes 2022–2026 ==
=== Affiliation Changes ===
- Feltham West Councillor Hina Mir was suspended by the Labour Party for employing an illegal worker as a nanny in her home in December 2025.
- Hounslow Heath Councillor Afzal Kiani resigned from the Labour Party to sit as an independent in November 2025.
- Cranford Councillor Vickram Grewal, elected as a Labour Councillor, joined the Conservatives in November 2025.
- Bedfont Councillor Raghwinder Siddhu, elected as a Labour Councillor, resigned from the Labour whip to sit as an independent councillor after his law firm was shut down by the Solicitors Regulation Authority.
- Brentford West Councillor Guy Lambert, elected as a Labour Councillor, joined the Green Party in November 2025.
- Heston Central Councillor Harleen Atwal resigned from the Labour Party to sit as an independent in November 2025.
- Heston Central Councillor Riaz Gull resigned from the Labour Party to sit as an independent in November 2025.
- Chiswick Gunnersbury Councillor Ranjit Gill, elected as a Conservative, joined Labour in May 2025.

=== By-elections ===
Heston West by-election: 9 March 2023
Party	Candidate	Votes	%	±%
Labour	Emma Siddhu	1,104	52.4	▼11.8
Liberal Democrats	Chaitan Shah	470	22.3	N/A
Conservative	Muraad Chaudhry	419	19.9	▼0.6
Green	Rashid Wahab	65	3.1	▼12.2
Independent	Bart Kuleba	48	2.3	N/A
Majority		634	30.4	N/A
Turnout		2,113	21.1	
Registered electors		10,035		
Labour hold				

Brentford West by-election, 2 May 2024
Party	Candidate	Votes	%	±%
Labour	Emma Yates	988	36.4	▼15.1
Independent	Theo Dennison	798	29.9	N/A
Conservative	Michael Denniss	414	15.2	▼2.7
Green	Freya Summersgill	338	12.4	▼16.9
Liberal Democrats	Will Francis	126	4.7	N/A
TUSC	John Viner	33	1.2	N/A
Registered electors		6,021		
Turnout		2,716	45.1	
Labour hold				

The Brentford West by-election was triggered by the resignation of Lara Parizotto, who had been elected as a Labour councillor but left the party in 2023 to sit as an independent.

Hanworth Village by-election: 4 July 2024
Party	Candidate	Votes	%	±%
Labour	Aysha Tariq	2,027	40.0	▼5.2
Conservative	Vanita Kanda	1,161	22.9	▼15.8
Liberal Democrats	William Francis	812	16.0	N/A
Independent	Zubair Awan	549	10.8	N/A
Green	Rashid Wahab	515	10.2	▲5.9
Majority		866	17.1	N/A
Turnout		5,135	45.9	
Registered electors		11,178		
Labour hold		Swing	▲5.3	

Brentford East by-election: 6 March 2025
Party	Candidate	Votes	%	±%
Labour	Max Mosley	430	48.1	▼14.7
Reform	David Kerr	197	22.0	N/A
Conservative	Christine Cunniffe	99	11.1	▼7.5
Green	Rashid Wahab	89	10.0	▼8.5
Liberal Democrats	Bernice Roust	79	8.8	N/A
Majority		233	26.1	N/A
Turnout		898	15.1	
Registered electors		5,951		
Labour hold				

Syon & Brentford Lock by-election: 6 March 2025
Party	Candidate	Votes	%	±%
Independent	Theo Dennison	615	33.5	▲12.3
Labour	Jennifer Prain	603	32.8	▼5.0
Green	Freya Summersgill	218	11.9	▼4.2
Conservative	Michael Denniss	150	8.2	▼6.6
Reform	Chinmay Parulekar	149	8.1	N/A
Liberal Democrats	Jack Ballentyne	102	5.6	▼4.5
Majority		12	0.7	N/A
Turnout		1,840	21.0	
Registered electors		8,775		
Independent gain from Labour		Swing	▲8.7	

Cranford by-election: 21 August 2025
Party	Candidate	Votes	%	±%
Labour	Hira Dhillon	951	40.7	▼12.6
Conservative	Gurpreet Sidhu	679	29.1	▲10.0
Reform	Khushwant Singh	405	17.3	N/A
Green	Gurpal Virdi	156	6.7	▼7.5
Liberal Democrats	Miruna Leitoiu	145	6.2	N/A
Majority		272	11.6	N/A
Turnout		2,355	21.7	
Registered electors		10,878		
Labour hold		Swing	▼11.3	
