= Russell Kerr =

British politician (1921–1983)

Member of Parliament for Feltham and Heston (1974–1983) Feltham (1966–1974)
- In office 31 March 1966 – 13 May 1983
- Preceded by: Albert Hunter
- Succeeded by: Patrick Ground

Personal details
- Born: Russell Whiston Kerr; 1 February 1921 Sydney, New South Wales, Australia
- Died: 15 November 1983 (aged 62) London, England
- Party: Labour (after 1950)
- Other political affiliations: Labor (1938–c. 1948)
- Spouses: Shirley Huie (m. 1946, divorced); Anne Clark (m. 1960; died 1973)
- Children: 2
- Education: University of Sydney

Military service
- Branch/service: Royal Air Force
- Unit: Pathfinder Force
- Battles/wars: World War II

Russell Whiston Kerr (1 February 1921 – 15 November 1983), was an Australian-born British Labour Party politician.

== Early life ==
Kerr was born in Sydney, and was educated at the Shore School, the Sydney Church of England Grammar School, and Sydney University. He served with the Pathfinder Force of the Royal Air Force during World War II, and moved to England in 1948. He became a director of the Town and Country Planning Association and an air charter executive. In 1950, he became a member of the British Labour Party, having previously been a member of the Australian Labor Party from 1938. He was a national executive member of the Association of Supervisory Staff, Executives and Technicians from 1964.

== Parliamentary career ==
Kerr contested Horsham in 1951, Merton and Morden in 1959 and Preston North in 1964.

He was member of parliament for Feltham from 1966 to 1974, and for Feltham and Heston from 1974 to 1983. He lost his seat in that year's landslide defeat for Labour, to the Conservative Patrick Ground. He was a democratic socialist and was named chairman of the Tribune Group in 1969.

== Personal life and death ==
In 1946, Kerr married Shirley Huie in Australia; they had two children and later divorced. He was married to Anne Kerr from 1960 to her death 1973. She was a Labour MP Rochester and Chatham from 1964 to 1970.

On 15 November 1983, after a period of declining health, Kerr died in Twickenham, at the wheel of his car. He was 62.

Parliament of the United Kingdom
Preceded by Albert Hunter	Member of Parliament for Feltham; 1966 – Feb 1974	Constituency abolished
New constituency	Member of Parliament for Feltham and Heston; Feb 1974 – 1983	Succeeded by Patrick Ground
