= Barney Hayhoe =

British politician (1925–2013)

The Right Honourable The Lord Hayhoe PC

Parliamentary Under-Secretary of State for the Army
- In office 4 May 1979 – 5 January 1981
- Prime Minister: Margaret Thatcher
- Preceded by: Robert Brown
- Succeeded by: Philip Goodhart

Member of Parliament for Brentford and Isleworth
- In office 28 February 1974 – 16 March 1992
- Preceded by: Constituency created
- Succeeded by: Nirj Deva

Member of Parliament for Heston and Isleworth
- In office 18 June 1970 – 8 February 1974
- Preceded by: Reader Harris
- Succeeded by: Constituency abolished

Member of the House of Lords
- Lord Temporal
- Life peerage 21 August 1992 – 7 September 2013

Personal details
- Born: Bernard John Hayhoe; 8 August 1925 Croydon, Surrey, England
- Died: 7 September 2013 (aged 88) Wimbledon, London, England
- Party: Conservative
- Spouse: Anne Thornton (m. 1962; died 2012)
- Children: 3

Bernard John Hayhoe, Baron Hayhoe, PC (8 August 1925 – 7 September 2013) was a British Conservative politician who was a Member of Parliament from 1970 to 1992.

== Early life ==
Hayhoe was born in Croydon on 8 August 1925, and attended Stanley Technical School, South Norwood. He left school at 16 to take up an apprenticeship in a toolroom and studied at Borough Polytechnic. He then joined the Ministry of Supply as a weapons engineer in the armaments department and later moved to the Inspectorate of Armaments.

== Political career ==
Hayhoe was elected the national chairman of the Young Conservatives in 1952 and left the civil service to contest Lewisham South at the 1964 election. He then worked for the Conservative Research Department. He was selected as the candidate for Heston and Isleworth for the 1970 election in place of Reader Harris, who was then facing criminal charges. Although Harris was acquitted before the election, Hayhoe remained the candidate.

Hayhoe was the Member of Parliament for Heston and Isleworth from 1970 until February 1974, then for Brentford and Isleworth from February 1974 until he retired at the 1992 general election. He had ministerial responsibility for the Army (1979–1981), the Civil Service Department (1981), the Civil Service (1981–1985) and the DHSS (1985–1986). He was on the moderate, left wing of the party and supported Michael Heseltine in his leadership challenge to Margaret Thatcher.

He was appointed as a Privy Councillor in 1985, knighted in 1987 and made a life peer on 21 August 1992 as Baron Hayhoe, of Isleworth in the London Borough of Hounslow.

== Personal life and death ==
In 1962, Hayhoe married Anne Thornton (d. 2012), and they had three children. He died from cerebrovascular disease at his Wimbledon home on 7 September 2013, at the age of 88.

Parliament of the United Kingdom
Preceded by Reader Harris	Member of Parliament for Heston and Isleworth; 1970 – Feb 1974	Constituency abolished
New constituency	Member of Parliament for Brentford and Isleworth; Feb 1974 – 1992	Succeeded by Nirj Deva
