= Patrick Ground =

British politician and barrister (1932–2026)

Patrick Ground KC
- Ground in 2015

Member of Parliament for Feltham and Heston
- In office 9 June 1983 – 16 March 1992
- Preceded by: Russell Kerr
- Succeeded by: Alan Keen

Personal details
- Born: 9 August 1932 West Ham, London, England
- Died: 7 April 2026 (aged 93)
- Party: Conservative
- Spouse: Caroline Dugdale (m. 1964)
- Occupation: Politician; senior barrister

Reginald Patrick Ground (9 August 1932 – 7 April 2026) was a British Conservative politician and barrister. He served as the Member of Parliament (MP) for Feltham and Heston from 1983 to 1992.

== Political career ==
Local level

Ground served as a councillor on the London Borough of Hammersmith from 1968 to 1971, representing the Parson's Green ward. In April 2015, he was selected locally to take the ceremonial role of president of the Feltham and Heston Conservative Association.

Parliamentary level

Ground stood as the Conservative candidate for the Feltham and Heston seat seven times, a constituency made up of the western half of the London Borough of Hounslow, between February 1974 and 1997. He won the successive elections in 1983 and 1987, but lost in 1992 to Alan Keen, the Labour Co-operative candidate. A backbencher, Ground spoke often on subjects of local government and planning. He advocated collectivist social advancement, opposing greater direct redistribution of income and wealth. As such, in the House of Commons, he argued strongly against measuring poverty primarily in relative terms, saying:

"It seems unsatisfactory to define poverty solely by reference to average incomes because if that were the true position, Labour Members could eliminate poverty completely--if they were able to do so--by expropriating all incomes of, say, 50 per cent. of average incomes or above. That would make for a tremendous reduction in poverty, according to the definition of Opposition Members, but nobody would be any happier or better off. It might please those with egalitarian passions, but it would not add anything to the good of the country."

— HC Deb, 19 December 1991 c527

== Legal career ==
His specialist area of advocacy was planning law and he was called to the Bar in 1960; he was appointed Queen's Counsel in 1981 (which became King's Counsel upon the death of Queen Elizabeth II on 8 September 2022). In 2015 he practised from his home address in Fulham.

== Personal life and the Fulham Society ==
Ground married Caroline Dugdale in 1964. In the 1980s, he chaired the cross-party Fulham Society, a residents' association and remained a vice-president into the 2010s decade with three others: a younger MP of his party, Andy Slaughter MP (Lab) and another former West London MP Lord Carrington.

Ground died on 7 April 2026, aged 93. His death was reported on 16 April, with the Conservative group leader on Hounslow Council paying tribute to him as a 'true gentleman who stayed in touch with his constituency'.

== Sources ==
- The Times Guide to the House of Commons, Times Newspapers Ltd, 1997
- Leigh Rayment's Historical List of MPs

Parliament of the United Kingdom
| Preceded by Russell Kerr | Member of Parliament for Feltham and Heston; 1983–1992 | Succeeded by Alan Keen |
