= Albert Hunter =

Albert Edward Hunter (1900 – 6 April 1969) JP MP was a British Labour politician.

== Career ==
He served at the end of World War I in an unstated capacity. He became a sales representative in London. He was a Member of Holborn Board of Guardians, 1925–1930; and of Holborn Borough Council, 1928–1934.

He was a trade union official in the National Union of Shop Assistants, rising to election as president from 1936 to 1937 and becoming treasurer from 1938 to 1944. He was elected to St Pancras Borough Council, 1945–1953, becoming alderman. He was appointed magistrate (JP) for the County of London in 1951 in which year he contested Spelthorne in outer Middlesex and lost by 1.84% of the vote against only one opponent, incumbent MP, George Beresford Craddock.

At the next general election he was elected MP for a newly created seat (Feltham) largely made up from parts of the growing-population seat Spelthorne (in 1955) and won the next polls there in 1959 and 1964. He retired for the 1966 election. The seat was won by the candidate of his party, Russell Kerr, on an increased majority. He died in 1969 while resident in London, at a hotel in South Kensington, and his comparatively modest assets at death were sworn that year at a little under £19,000 (equivalent to £276,000 in 2025).
