= Brentford and Isleworth =

UK Parliament constituency (since 1974)

Coordinates: 51.4802°N 0.3236°W

- Borough constituency for the House of Commons
- Interactive map of boundaries from 2024
- Location within Greater London
- County: Greater London
- Population: 129,500 (2022)
- Electorate: 76,345 (March 2020)
- Major settlements: Brentford, Isleworth, Osterley, Whitton

Current constituency
- Created: 1974
- Member of Parliament: Ruth Cadbury (Labour)
- Seats: One
- Created from: Brentford & Chiswick and Heston & Isleworth

Brentford and Isleworth (/ˈaɪzəlwərθ/ EYE-zəl-wərth) is a constituency (Note: A borough constituency (for the purposes of election expenses and type of returning officer)) represented in the House of Commons of the UK Parliament. It forms the eastern part of the London Borough of Hounslow. Since 2015, it has been represented by Ruth Cadbury of the Labour Party. (Note: As with all constituencies, the constituency elects one Member of Parliament (MP) by the first past the post system of election at least every five years.)

Following the completion of the 2023 review of Westminster constituencies, the seat was subjected to boundary changes which moved Whitton from Twickenham into the constituency, and moved Chiswick to the newly created constituency of Hammersmith and Chiswick.

== Constituency profile ==
The seat is a mixture of very suburban London and urban district centres with many differing heights and types of homes. It stretches along the north bank of the Thames and then to the west, encompassing the London districts (former villages) of Chiswick, most of Hounslow, Isleworth (from Old Isleworth to Osterley) and the former market town of Brentford.

The seat is affluent nearest the Thames and Osterley Park, yet it has a few tall tower blocks and other council housing set back from it in parts of Isleworth and Brentford. Brentford has a wide range and long history of social housing, which is mostly, by a narrow margin, private housing, following the 1980s Right to Buy reform. Locally, 21st century development includes a large proportion of shared ownership and housing authority homes. The seat has seen more unemployment (11.7% in 2017) than London (5.3%) or the UK (4.4%) overall.

About three wards make up Hounslow in the west, and two for Brentford in the centre, which, excluding its expensive Quay and North Quarter parts, have an above-average rank in the Index of Multiple Deprivation; many of these homes are affordable for workers on lower incomes, and are generally strong for the Labour Party. In the far east of the seat are three Chiswick wards that return Conservative councillors. Chiswick's large public sector economic component, and relatively young profile for a wealthy area sees a three-way or broader split in its general election votes. The only part of the seat with a London postcode – W4, it abounds with high-income office workers, small-to-mid-size business directors and senior governmental workers. Its parks, gardens, long Thames riverside, proximity to Hammersmith, united Piccadilly and District tube lines and housing stock mean it resembles the neighbouring Richmond Park seat socio-economically. The wards of Osterley, Spring Grove and Hounslow South have long alternated between, or generated a split result between, Conservative and Labour councillors, and there is no evidence to suggest they lean more to the left of their local results at general elections.

The Liberal Democrats (including their two predecessor parties) took their largest share of the vote here in 2010, but they have lacked local councillors, and the party received less than a quarter of the vote in what was essentially a three-candidate race.

The Green Party kept its deposits in three of the four contests before 2017. In the election that year it chose not to field a candidate, in order to help Labour defend its 400-vote majority.

Economy

The Brentford Community Stadium, home of Brentford F.C., is within the seat, as is Fuller's Brewery, and various headquarters of multinational and market-leading domestic companies, including GlaxoSmithKline and BSkyB. The districts have tube or rail services to the east and west of London (to Heathrow Airport, Ealing and/or Weybridge), which are major centres of employment.

Political history (summary)

From 1979 until 2015, the seat proved to be a national bellwether. The 2015 result gave the seat the 4th most marginal majority of Labour's 232 seats by percentage of majority. During the seat's existence, the two largest parties nationally have jostled for the winning candidate. In 2015, Labour gained the seat, despite the Conservatives winning a majority nationally, thus ending its streak as a bellwether constituency.

=== Split of votes in local council elections ===
In 2010, council seats split evenly (15—15) between the two main parties, reflecting the result of the general election held on the same day, in which the parliamentary seat was narrowly gained by the Conservatives. From 1998 to 2001, three wards at the centre of the constituency returned Independent Community Group councillors, reaching seven seats at their peak. These wards were taken by Labour in 2010.

Labour added Hounslow South in 2014, and took one of the three Osterley and Spring Grove seats, leaving them with 19 seats and the Conservatives with 11. In 2018, Labour gained the remaining Conservative seats in Osterley and Spring Grove, which gave Labour 21 seats to the Conservatives on 9.

== Boundaries ==
=== Historic ===
Map of boundaries 2010–2024

1974–1983: The London Borough of Hounslow wards of Clifden, Gunnersbury, Homefields, Hounslow Central, Hounslow South, Isleworth North, Isleworth South, Riverside, Spring Grove, and Turnham Green.

1983–1997: The above wards as renamed: Brentford Clifden, Chiswick Homefields, Chiswick Riverside, Gunnersbury, Hounslow Central, Hounslow South, Isleworth North, Isleworth South, Spring Grove, and Turnham Green.

1997–2010: As above plus Hounslow West.

2010–2024: The London Borough of Hounslow wards of Brentford, Chiswick Homefields, Chiswick Riverside, Hounslow Central, Hounslow Heath, Hounslow South, Isleworth, Osterley and Spring Grove, Syon, and Turnham Green.

=== Current ===
Further to the 2023 review of Westminster constituencies, which came into effect for the 2024 general election, the constituency is composed of:

- The London Borough of Hounslow wards of Brentford East; Brentford West; Heston East; Hounslow Central; Hounslow East; Hounslow Heath; Hounslow South; Isleworth; Osterley & Spring Grove; Syon & Brentford Lock; and
- The London Borough of Richmond upon Thames ward of Whitton.

The easternmost part of the constituency, comprising the district of Chiswick was transferred to the new constituency of Hammersmith and Chiswick. To partly compensate, the Hounslow Borough ward of Heston East and the Richmond upon Thames ward of Whitton were added from Feltham and Heston, and Twickenham respectively. The ward names reflect the local authority boundary review in Hounslow which came into effect in May 2022.

== Members of Parliament ==
The constituency was created in 1974, mostly replacing the former seat of Brentford and Chiswick.

Election	Member	Party
Feb 1974	Sir Barney Hayhoe	Conservative
1992	Nirj Deva	Conservative
1997	Ann Keen	Labour
2010	Mary Macleod	Conservative
2015	Ruth Cadbury	Labour

== Election results ==
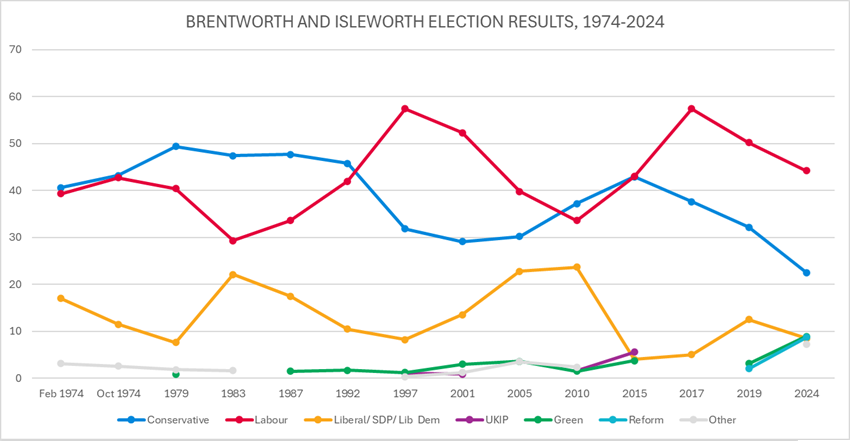
Election results 1974-2024

=== Elections in the 2020s ===
General election 2024: Brentford and Isleworth
Party	Candidate	Votes	%	±%
Labour	Ruth Cadbury	20,007	44.2	−6.1
Conservative	Laura Blumenthal	10,183	22.5	−5.8
Green	Freya Summersgill	4,029	8.9	+5.9
Reform	David Kerr	3,940	8.7	+6.6
Liberal Democrats	Kuldev Sehra	3,863	8.5	−7.8
Workers Party	Nisar Malik	2,746	6.1	N/A
Independent	Zebunisa Rao	486	1.1	N/A
Majority		9,824	21.7	–0.3
Turnout		45,254	57.1	–10.5
Registered electors		79,283		
Labour hold		Swing	▼0.2	

=== Elections in the 2010s ===
2019 notional result (Note: Estimate of the 2019 general election result as if the revised boundaries recommended under the 2023 boundary review were in place)
Party	Vote	%
Labour	25,978	50.3
Conservative	14,609	28.3
Liberal Democrats	8,425	16.3
Green	1,540	3.0
Brexit Party	1,063	2.1
Majority	11,369	22.0
Turnout	51,615	67.6
Electorate	76,354	

General election 2019: Brentford and Isleworth
Party	Candidate	Votes	%	±%
Labour	Ruth Cadbury	29,266	50.2	−7.2
Conservative	Seena Shah	18,752	32.2	−5.4
Liberal Democrats	Helen Cross	7,314	12.5	+7.5
Green	Daniel Goldsmith	1,829	3.1	N/A
Brexit Party	Lucy O'Sullivan	1,165	2.0	N/A
Majority		10,514	18.0	−1.8
Turnout		58,326	68.0	−4.4
Registered electors		85,770		
Labour hold		Swing	-0.9	

Results of UK House of Commons seat Brentford and Isleworth since 2005.

General election 2017: Brentford and Isleworth
Party	Candidate	Votes	%	±%
Labour	Ruth Cadbury	35,364	57.4	+13.6
Conservative	Mary Macleod	23,182	37.6	−5.3
Liberal Democrats	Joseph Bourke	3,083	5.0	+1.0
Majority		12,182	19.8	+19.0
Turnout		61,629	72.4	+4.6
Registered electors		85,164		
Labour hold		Swing	+9.5	

General election 2015: Brentford and Isleworth
Party	Candidate	Votes	%	±%
Labour	Ruth Cadbury	25,096	43.8	+10.2
Conservative	Mary Macleod	24,631	42.9	+5.7
UKIP	Richard Hendron	3,203	5.6	+4.0
Liberal Democrats	Joseph Bourke	2,305	4.0	−19.7
Green	Daniel Goldsmith	2,120	3.7	+2.2
Majority		465	0.9	N/A
Turnout		57,355	67.8	+3.4
Registered electors		84,602		
Labour gain from Conservative		Swing	+2.2	

General election 2010: Brentford and Isleworth
Party	Candidate	Votes	%	±%
Conservative	Mary Macleod	20,022	37.2	+6.4
Labour	Ann Keen	18,064	33.6	−5.0
Liberal Democrats	Andrew S. Dakers	12,718	23.7	+0.6
UKIP	Jason D. Hargreaves	863	1.6	N/A
Green	John G. Hunt	787	1.5	−2.1
BNP	Paul Winnett	704	1.3	N/A
English Democrat	David B. Cunningham	230	0.4	N/A
Christian	Aamir J. Bhatti	210	0.4	N/A
CPA	Evangeline Pillai	99	0.2	N/A
Independent	Teresa M. Vanneck-Surplice	68	0.1	N/A
Majority		1,958	3.6	N/A
Turnout		53,765	64.4	+9.8
Registered electors		83,546		
Conservative gain from Labour		Swing	+5.7	

=== Elections in the 2000s ===
2005 notional result
Party	Vote	%
Labour	16,764	38.6
Conservative	13,381	30.8
Liberal Democrats	9,995	23.0
Others	3,255	7.5
Turnout	43,395	54.6
Electorate	79,549	

General election 2005: Brentford and Isleworth
Party	Candidate	Votes	%	±%
Labour	Ann Keen	18,329	39.8	−12.5
Conservative	Alexander B. Northcote	13,918	30.2	+1.1
Liberal Democrats	Andrew S. Dakers	10,477	22.8	+9.3
Green	John G. Hunt	1,652	3.6	+0.6
Community Group	Philip Andrews	1,118	2.4	N/A
National Front	Michael R. Stoneman	523	1.1	N/A
Majority		4,411	9.6	−13.6
Turnout		46,017	54.5	+0.8
Registered electors		88,236		
Labour hold		Swing	−6.8	

General election 2001: Brentford and Isleworth
Party	Candidate	Votes	%	±%
Labour	Ann Keen	23,275	52.3	−5.1
Conservative	Timothy Mack	12,957	29.1	−2.7
Liberal Democrats	Gareth Hartwell	5,994	13.5	+5.3
Green	Nicholas Ferriday	1,324	3.0	+1.8
UKIP	Gerald Ingram	412	0.9	−0.2
Socialist Alliance	Daniel Faith	408	0.9	N/A
Independent	Asa Khaira	144	0.3	N/A
Majority		10,318	23.2	−2.6
Turnout		44,514	53.7	−15.8
Registered electors		82,878		
Labour hold		Swing	-1.2	

=== Elections in the 1990s ===
General election 1997: Brentford and Isleworth
Party	Candidate	Votes	%	±%
Labour	Ann Keen	32,249	57.4	+14.7
Conservative	Nirj Deva	17,825	31.8	−13.9
Liberal Democrats	Gareth Hartwell	4,613	8.2	−1.9
Green	John W. Bradley	687	1.2	−0.5
UKIP	B. Simmerson	614	1.1	N/A
Natural Law	Morris Ahmed	147	0.3	N/A
Majority		14,424	25.7	N/A
Turnout		56,135	69.5	−4.7
Registered electors		80,722		
Labour gain from Conservative		Swing	+14.3	

1992 notional result
Party	Vote	%
Conservative	26,994	45.6
Labour	25,319	42.8
Liberal Democrats	5,962	10.1
Others	904	1.5
Turnout	59,179	74.2
Electorate	79,763	

General election 1992: Brentford and Isleworth
Party	Candidate	Votes	%	±%
Conservative	Nirj Deva	24,752	45.8	−1.9
Labour	Ann Keen	22,666	42.0	+8.7
Liberal Democrats	Janet C.N. Salmon	5,683	10.5	−7.0
Green	John W. Bradley	927	1.7	+0.2
Majority		2,086	3.9	−10.6
Turnout		54,024	76.2	−0.4
Registered electors		70,880		
Conservative hold		Swing	−5.3	

=== Elections in the 1980s ===
General election 1987: Brentford and Isleworth
Party	Candidate	Votes	%	±%
Conservative	Barney Hayhoe	26,230	47.7	+0.3
Labour	Ann Keen	18,277	33.2	+4.0
SDP	David Wilks	9,626	17.5	−4.6
Green	Timothy Cooper	849	1.5	N/A
Majority		7,953	14.1	–4.0
Turnout		54,983	76.7	+1.9
Registered electors		71,715		
Conservative hold		Swing	−1.8	

General election 1983: Brentford and Isleworth
Party	Candidate	Votes	%	±%
Conservative	Barney Hayhoe	24,515	47.4	−2.0
Labour	Peter Rowlands	15,128	29.3	−11.2
SDP	David Wilks	11,438	22.1	+14.6
National Front	P. Andrews	427	0.8	−0.5
Conservatives Against the Common Market	R.E.G. Simmerson	179	0.3	–0.1
Majority		9,387	18.2	+9.2
Turnout		51,683	74.7	−3.4
Registered electors		69,170		
Conservative hold		Swing	+4.6	

=== Elections in the 1970s ===
General election 1979: Brentford and Isleworth
Party	Candidate	Votes	%	±%
Conservative	Barney Hayhoe	27,527	49.4	+6.3
Labour	Peter Walker	22,533	40.4	−2.3
Liberal	John Parry	4,208	7.6	−4.0
National Front	Peter Attridge	738	1.3	−1.3
Ecology	Irene Coates	454	0.8	N/A
Conservatives Against the Common Market	Reginald Simmerson	257	0.5	N/A
Majority		4,994	9.0	+8.6
Turnout		55,714	78.1	+4.8
Registered electors		71,337		
Conservative hold		Swing	+4.3	

General election October 1974: Brentford and Isleworth
Party	Candidate	Votes	%	±%
Conservative	Barney Hayhoe	22,527	43.2	+2.6
Labour	Peter Walker	22,295	42.7	+3.4
Liberal	R. Blundell	6,019	11.5	−5.5
National Front	T. Benford	1,362	2.6	−0.5
Majority		232	0.4	−0.9
Turnout		52,203	73.3	−5.7
Registered electors		71,199		
Conservative hold		Swing	−0.4	

General election February 1974: Brentford and Isleworth
Party	Candidate	Votes	%	±%
Conservative	Barney Hayhoe	22,690	40.6	–11.4
Labour	Michael Barnes	21,964	39.3	–8.7
Liberal	David Blackburn	9,502	17.0	N/A
National Front	T. Benford	1,741	3.1	N/A
Majority		726	1.3	–2.7
Turnout		55,894	79.0	+7.4
Registered electors		70,735		
Conservative hold		Swing	–1.4	

1970 notional result
Party	Vote	%
Conservative	28,300	52.0
Labour	26,100	48.0
Turnout	54,400	71.7
Electorate	75,918	

== See also ==
- parliamentary constituencies in London
