= Brentford East =

Electoral ward in the Borough of Hounslow

- Electoral ward for the Hounslow London Borough Council
- Brentford East ward boundaries since 2022
- Borough: Hounslow
- County: Greater London
- Population: 8,692 (2021) (Note: 2021 Census data reported for 2022 ward boundaries)
- Electorate: 5,941 (2026)
- Area: 0.9049 square kilometres (0.3494 sq mi)

Current electoral ward
- Created: 2022
- Number of members: 2
- Councillors: Marina Sharma; Max Mosley
- Created from: Brentford
- GSS code: E05013607

Brentford East is an electoral ward in the London Borough of Hounslow. The ward was first used in the 2022 elections. It returns two councillors to Hounslow London Borough Council.

== Councillors ==
Election	Councillors	
2026	Marcela Benedetti (Labour)	Max Mosley (Labour)
2022	Rhys Williams (Labour)	Marina Sharma (Labour)

== Hounslow council elections ==
=== 2026 election ===
The election took place on 7 May 2026.

2026 Hounslow London Borough Council election: Brentford East
Party	Candidate	Votes	%	±%
Labour	Marcela Benedetti	812	42.9	−23.8
Labour	Max Mosley	740	39.1	−23.6
Green	Tony Firkins	514	27.1	+7.4
Reform	Martin Pennell	398	21.0	New
Reform	Irena Tumilowicz	342	18.1	New
Liberal Democrats	Bernice Elaine Roust	272	14.4	New
Conservative	Paul Baksh	233	12.3	−7.6
Conservative	Zoe Ward	192	10.1	−7.0
Turnout		1,894	31.9	+3.4
Labour hold		Swing		
Labour hold		Swing		

=== 2025 by-election ===
The by-election took place on 6 March 2025, following the resignation of Rhys Williams. It was held on the same day as the 2025 Syon and Brentford Lock by-election.

2025 Brentford East by-election
Party	Candidate	Votes	%	±%
Labour	Max Mosley	430	47.9	
Reform	David Kerr	197	21.9	
Conservative	Christine Cunniffe	99	11.0	
Green	Rashid Wahab	89	9.9	
Liberal Democrats	Bernice Roust	79	8.8	
Turnout		898	15.1	
Labour hold		Swing		

=== 2022 election ===
The election took place on 5 May 2022.

2022 Hounslow London Borough Council election: Brentford East
Party	Candidate	Votes	%	±%
Labour	Rhys Williams	1,058	66.7	
Labour	Marina Sharma	994	62.7	
Conservative	Thomas Hearn	314	19.9	
Green	Freya Summersgill	312	19.7	
Conservative	Paul Baksh	271	17.1	
Turnout		1,586	28.5	
Labour win (new seat)				
Labour win (new seat)				
