= Osterley and Spring Grove =

Electoral ward in London, England

- Electoral ward for the Hounslow London Borough Council
- Osterley and Spring Grove ward boundaries since 2022
- Borough: Hounslow
- County: Greater London
- Population: 14,660 (2021)
- Electorate: 10,449 (2026)
- Major settlements: Osterley and Spring Grove
- Area: 6.375 km²

Current electoral ward
- Created: 2002
- Councillors: Tony Louki; Unsa Chaudri; Ranjit Gill
- Created from: Spring Grove

Osterley and Spring Grove is an electoral ward in the London Borough of Hounslow. The ward was first used in the 2002 elections and elects three councillors to Hounslow London Borough Council.

== Geography ==
The ward is named after the suburbs of Osterley and Spring Grove.

== Councillors ==
Election	Councillors		
2026	Tony Louki (Labour)	Unsa Chaudri (Labour and Co-operative)	Ranjit Gill (Labour)
2022	Unsa Chaudri (Labour and Co-operative)	Tony Louki (Labour)	Aftab Siddiqui (Labour)

== Elections ==
=== 2026 Hounslow London Borough Council election ===
Osterley & Spring Grove (3)
Party	Candidate	Votes	%	±%
Labour	Tony Louki	1,657	39.2	−20.9
Labour	Unsa Kausar Chaudri	1,539	36.5	−13.2
Labour	Ranjit Gill	1,425	33.8	−12.8
Conservative	Jason Harcourt	1,095	25.9	−5.5
Conservative	Christopher Raynor	1,010	23.9	−5.9
Green	Sara Novakovic	988	23.4	+7.3
Conservative	Sheetal Tiwari	954	22.6	−5.3
Reform	Xavier Fernandes	571	13.5	New
Reform	Scott Parkins	553	13.1	New
Liberal Democrats	Thomas Fidler	548	13.0	−3.0
Liberal Democrats	Millicent Scott Brooks	483	11.4	
Reform	Jenson Zhu	457	10.8	New
Liberal Democrats	Christopher David Holman	442	10.5	
Turnout		4,222	40.4	
Labour hold		Swing		
Labour hold		Swing		
Labour hold		Swing		

=== 2022 Hounslow London Borough Council election ===
Osterley & Spring Grove (3)
Party	Candidate	Votes	%	±%
Labour	Tony Louki	2,116	60.1	
Labour	Unsa Kausar Chaudri	1,751	49.7	
Labour	Aftab Siddiqui	1,640	46.6	
Conservative	Jason Dylan Willoughby Harcourt	1,105	31.4	
Conservative	Sukhy Bahia	1,048	29.8	
Conservative	Maneesh Singh	982	27.9	
Green	Rashid Wahab	566	16.1	
Liberal Democrats	Judith Kowalczyk	565	16.0	
Turnout		3,521		
Labour hold		Swing		
Labour hold		Swing		
Labour hold		Swing		
