= Syon and Brentford Lock =

Electoral ward in the Borough of Hounslow

- Electoral ward for the Hounslow London Borough Council
- Syon and Brentford Lock ward boundaries since 2022
- Borough: Hounslow
- County: Greater London
- Population: 12,948 (2021) (Note: 2021 Census data reported for 2022 ward boundaries)
- Electorate: 8,961 (2026)
- Area: 2.4 square kilometres (0.93 sq mi)

Current electoral ward
- Created: 2022
- Number of members: 3
- Councillors: Dan Bowring; Katherine Dunne; Theo Dennison
- Created from: Syon
- GSS code: E05013627

Syon and Brentford Lock is an electoral ward in the London Borough of Hounslow. The ward was first used in the 2022 elections. It returns three councillors to Hounslow London Borough Council.

== Councillors ==
Election	Councillors		
2026	Dan Bowring (Labour)	Theo Dennison (Independent)	Katherine Dunne (Labour)
2025 by-election			Theo Dennison (Independent)
2022	Dan Bowring (Labour)	Katherine Dunne (Labour)	Balraj Sarai (Labour)

== Hounslow council elections ==
=== 2026 election ===
The election took place on 7 May 2026.

2026 Hounslow London Borough Council election: Syon and Brentford Lock (3)
Party	Candidate	Votes	%	±%
Labour	Dan Bowring	1,284	35.4	−17.4
Labour	Katherine Sarah Dunne	1,276	35.1	−14.3
Independent	Theo Dennison	1,098	30.2	+0.5
Labour	Jennifer Jane Prain	1,031	28.4	−10.6
Green	Namaa Al-Mahdi	903	24.9	+2.3
Independent	Joshua Harwood	633	17.4	New
Independent	Dave Waller	602	16.6	New
Reform	Kevin David Cronin	532	14.6	New
Reform	Nicola Thrower	456	12.6	New
Reform	Shashi Kumar	409	11.3	New
Conservative	Max Booth	398	11.0	−9.7
Liberal Democrats	Lionel Girling	364	10.0	−4.1
Conservative	Sam Hearn	352	9.7	−9.9
Liberal Democrats	Phyllis Ann Van der Esch	298	8.2	−4.9
Conservative	David Mayes	296	8.1	
Independent	Aarti Pawan Nayak	96	2.6	New
Turnout		3,632	40.5	+7.2
Labour hold		Swing		
Labour hold		Swing		
Independent gain from Labour		Swing	8.9	

=== 2025 by-election ===
The by-election took place on 6 March 2025, following the resignation of Balraj Sarai. It was held on the same day as the 2025 Brentford East by-election.

2025 Syon and Brentford Lock by-election
Party	Candidate	Votes	%	±%
Independent	Theo Dennison	615	33.5	+12.3
Labour	Jennifer Prain	603	32.8	−4.9
Green	Freya Summersgill	218	11.9	−4.3
Conservative	Michael Denniss	150	8.2	−6.6
Reform	Chinmay Parulekar	149	8.1	New
Liberal Democrats	Jack Ballentyne	102	5.6	−4.5
Turnout		1,840	21.0	−12.3
Independent gain from Labour		Swing		

=== 2022 election ===
The election took place on 5 May 2022.

2022 Hounslow London Borough Council election: Syon and Brentford Lock
Party	Candidate	Votes	%	±%
Labour	Katherine Dunne	1,463	52.8	
Labour	Dan Bowring	1,368	49.4	
Labour	Balraj Sarai	1,080	39.0	
Independent	Theo Dennison	822	29.7	
Green	Anthony Agius	625	22.6	
Conservative	Adam Ali	573	20.7	
Conservative	Chaitan Sinha	542	19.6	
Liberal Democrats	Phyllis Van der esch	391	14.1	
Liberal Democrats	Christopher Gillie	363	13.1	
Liberal Democrats	Jack Ballentyne	314	11.3	
Turnout		2,770	33.3	
Labour win (new seat)				
Labour win (new seat)				
Labour win (new seat)				
