= Andrew Charalambous =

British businessman and UKIP politician

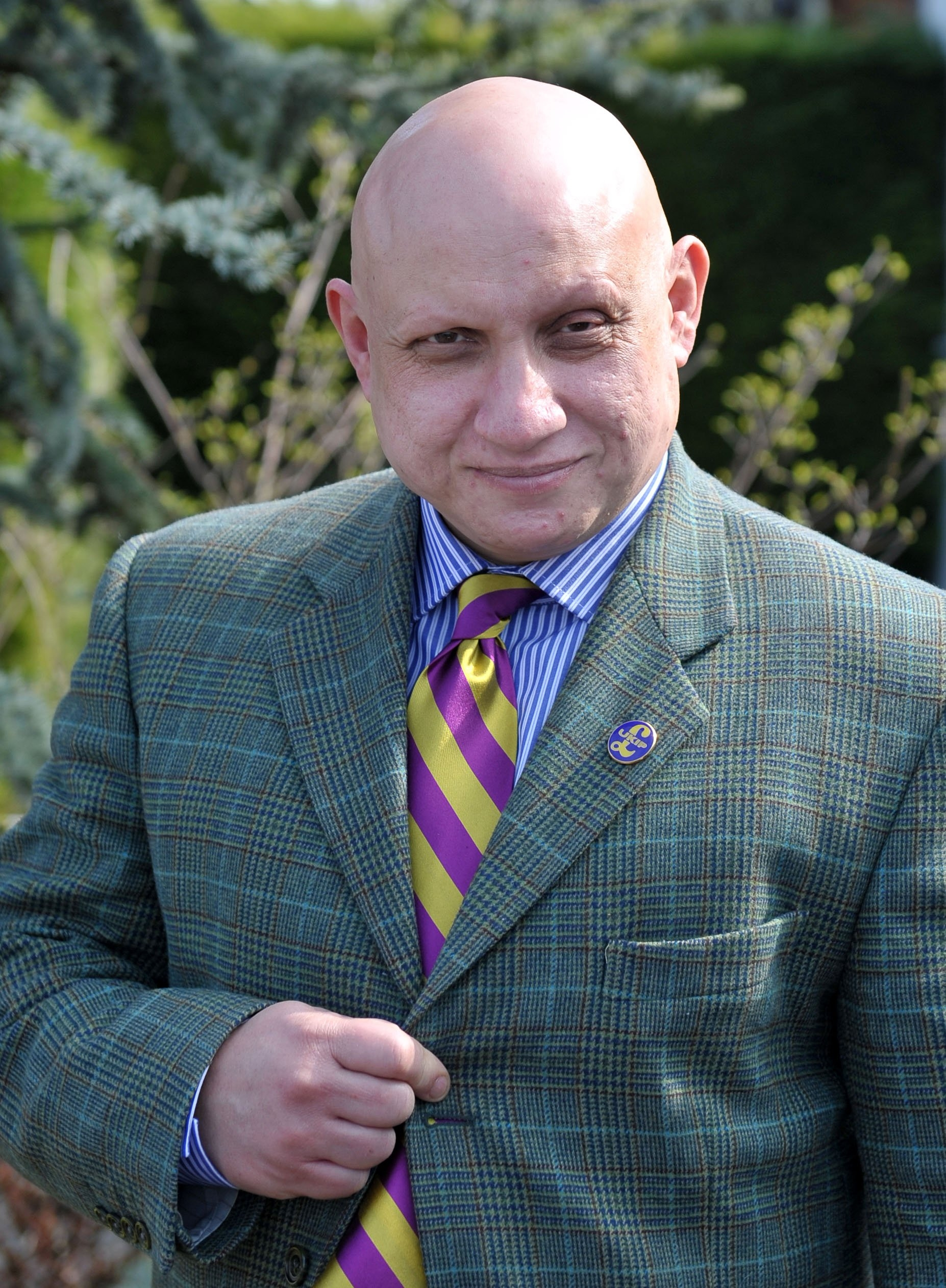
- Andrew Charalambous, in 2015

UKIP Work and Pensions Spokesperson
- In office 2 December 2016 – September 2017
- Leader: Paul Nuttall; Steve Crowther (Acting); Henry Bolton; Gerard Batten
- Preceded by: Jane Collins

UKIP Housing and Environment Spokesperson
- In office 24 July 2014 – 2 December 2016
- Leader: Nigel Farage
- Preceded by: Office established
- Succeeded by: Ray Finch

Personal details
- Born: Andrew Lambrou Charalambous; 1967 (age 58–59) Islington, London, England
- Party: UK Independence Party (2011 - 2017)
- Other political affiliations: Conservative Party (before 2011)
- Education: Swiss School Of Business Research (PhD)
- Website: www.andrewcharalambous.com

Andrew Lambrou Charalambous (born 1967) is a British businessman, former politician and award-winning social entrepreneur, philanthropist, environmentalist and environmental blogger.

== Life ==
His Greek Cypriot father served as a soldier for the British in World War II and later settled in the United Kingdom. Andrew Charalambous attended William Forster School in Tottenham. He completed his Law Degree (LLB) at Queen Mary College, University of London, and subsequently qualified as a Barrister- at-Law in 1989, at the then Inns of Court School of Law. He also completed a CertHE in Philosophy, in 2021, with the University of Oxford.In 2024, Charalambous earned a PhD from the Swiss School Of Business Research and subsequently joined the institution as a professor. Charalambous was previously Housing and Environment Spokesman, for UKIP.

He was appointed Work and Pensions Spokesman for UKIP in 2016. Leader Paul Nuttall said “By promoting Andrew Charalambous to the role of Work and Pensions I am happy to bring forward someone with keen intelligence and application that the role requires.

As UKIP Work and Pensions Spokesman, he called for action to end the north–south divide, and for government to extend its employment drive to parts of the U.K. which have never recovered the loss of their manufacturing base.

Charalambous, a Farage-loyalist, subsequently left UKIP, and is reported to have changed his mind, and voted against brexit. He was also a special constable, for 18 years from 1995, serving under the Metropolitan Police, City of London Police and Honourable Artillery Company.

He made a career in business as a property developer and private landlord. Charalambous was reported to own a thousand properties. The Daily Telegraph newspaper poked fun at him for falling out with his bank for allegedly helping homeless people, by taking them off the streets of Covent Garden in London and putting them in his properties. It was also pointed out in the Sunday Mirror that housing in his property portfolio has been rented out to immigrant tenants, despite the fact that UKIP leader Nigel Farage was calling for greater controls on immigration.

However, the City Monitor reported that Charalambous spoke up for the benefits of immigration, arguing that “London benefits vastly from being a cosmopolitan city, and that is largely due to the fact we have immigration….that enriches and makes London a stronger, more diverse, more lively city.” The same article, noted that Charalambous was warning of the damage that demonising poorer people could do to the social contract.

Charalambous, a social entrepreneur, does not, as a rule, charge his tenants deposits and administration fees, or seek references. The Estate Gazette reported that “the colourful Charalambous defies preconceptions. If it wasn't for a lapel pin advocating recognition of St George's Day as a national holiday, he wouldn't seem out of place handing out pamphlets for the Greens in Brighton.

Andrew Charalambous is honorary advisor to, and Emeritus Professor of Exim Bank Agricultural University, in Bangladesh. He is a Fellow of the Institute of Directors, Fellow of the Royal Society of Arts, Fellow of the Chartered Management Institute and Fellow of the Institute of Administrative Management. He has been described as a 'free thinker' committed to tackling homelessness.

== Political activities ==
In the 1992 General Election, Charalambous stood for the Conservatives in Tottenham, as the youngest candidate of any main party in the general election. He stood twice for the Conservative Party as a parliamentary candidate, in Tottenham and Edmonton in 2010. Andrew Charalambous was a leading financial donor to the Party, a founder of the Conservative Climate Campaign, and Conservative Friends of Cyprus.

In early 2011, Charalambous switched from the Conservatives to UKIP, citing the fact that the Conservative coalition government was cutting healthcare services, particularly the accident and emergency department at the Chase Farm Hospital In Enfield, north London. Charalambous had campaigned vigorously to keep the accident and emergency service at the hospital from being closed.

Charalambous was a leading campaigner for the British countryside and green belt, innovating the brownfield-first policy. As Housing and Environment Spokesman, he claimed at the UKIP Party Conference of 2014 that “We would issue brownfield bonds with the aim of raising £5bn to fuel our brownfield revitalisation programme - paving the way for more affordable housing and more home ownership by investing in our country’s most derelict and underused land rather than turning beautiful landscapes into concrete jungles.

He went on to declare that “UKIP will never concede an inch of the British countryside to residential development….. Politicians do not have the right to deprive future generations from living the marvels of the British countryside - to confine their experience of the beauty of Britain to images in photographs and video archives.

== Environmental efforts ==
Charalambous, dubbed Dr Earth, opened Surya, the worlds first sustainable nightclub in London’s, Kings Cross in 2008. (The Times article, July 12, 2008). One of the venues main features was a piezoelectric dance floor that aimed to harness energy through human movement. This initiative led the Economist to assert that “it is hard not to feel a flicker of admiration for Mr Charalambous.” In parallel, he also launched Club4Climate, designed to educate and engage more young people in the fight against climate change. Charalambous was described as Kate Moss and Jade Jagger's Green Guru, and Green Guru to the stars, by the Herald of Scotland. Andrew Charalambous claimed in an interview with the Financial Times that “ There is a new type of corporation destined to come forward, now that people are much closer to global needs, the market and the consumer.......With an issue like climate change, for example, this is where publicly funded organisations are stuck in a publicly funded mentality.

Andrew Charalambous is an animal rights activist, and 'deep ecologist' who has claimed that humankind "have enslaved, caged and committed genocide against the animal kingdom. We have eliminated 75% of wildlife, forced thousands of species to extinction, or to the verge of. We have concreted their habitats and savagely dominated their kingdom."

== Philanthropy ==
Charalambous is a member of Greenpeace. He is a patron of the Leukaemia Cancer Society. Charalambous is Grand Patron of the Lambros Charalambous Christian Orphanage, in Kenya, named after his late father. He is also honorary president of the Orthodox College of Africa and the Patriarchal Ecclesiastical School of Kenya. On the website of the Royal Confraternity of San Teotonio (Real Confraria de Sao Teotonio), Charalambous appears as having been awarded with the Cross of Merit. The Confraternity is known in Portugal for its charitable works, including the support of the sick and impoverished. In 2022, Charalambous was appointed as the International Delegate representing the United Kingdom for the Flame of Peace Association, a non-profit organization dedicated to recognizing and promoting peace initiatives worldwide. The Flame of Peace Association, presided over by Herta Margarete Habsburg-Lothringen, Archduchess of Austria and Princess of Tuscany, honors individuals and organizations for their contributions to peace, operating independently of political or religious affiliations. As part of his role, Charalambous supported a project in the Nyeri province of Kenya, where 1,000 trees were planted under the initiative "Trees for Peace and Friendship," aimed at fostering environmental protection and promoting peace.
