= Osterley =

District of Isleworth, London, England

Coordinates: 51.4848°N 0.3500°W

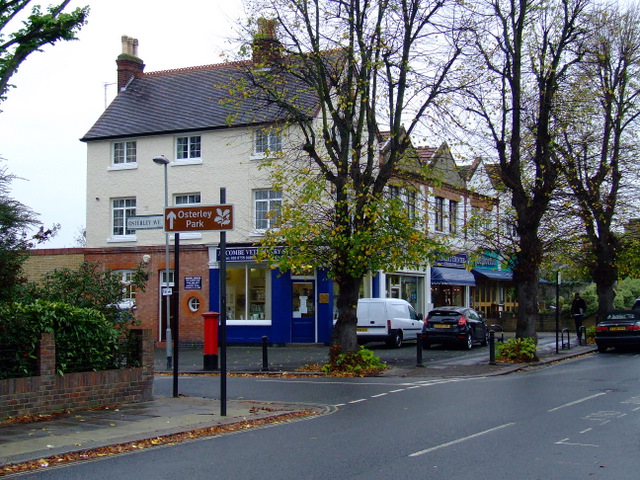
- Shops on Thornbury Road, Osterley

- Location within Greater London
- Population: 13,031 (2011 Census. Osterley and Spring Grove Ward)
- OS grid reference: TQ145775
- London borough: Hounslow
- Ceremonial county: Greater London
- Region: London
- Country: England
- Sovereign state: United Kingdom
- Post town: HOUNSLOW
- Postcode district: TW5
- Post town: ISLEWORTH
- Postcode district: TW7
- Dialling code: 020
- Police: Metropolitan
- Fire: London
- Ambulance: London
- UK Parliament: Brentford & Isleworth
- London Assembly: South West

Osterley (/ˈɒstərli/ OST-ər-lee) is a district of Isleworth in west London, England, 8.7 miles (14.0 km) from Charing Cross in the London Borough of Hounslow. Most of its land use is mixed agricultural and aesthetic parkland at Osterley House (National Trust), charity-run, much of which is open to paying visitors.

Osterley is on elevated soil, bisected by the A4 (Great West Road), and extends north of the M4 motorway. Syon Lane forms the border to the east, while the border with Heston is to the west. Osterley extends south of the A4, including St Mary's Church.

Most of the land of Osterley is the large ancestral private estate of Osterley Park and its mansion. These were formerly owned by the Jersey family and were used during World War II as the home for Tom Wintringham's Home Guard training school. They are now National Trust property. In the 1930s, when the Great West Road was completed, ribbon development housing appeared, and this gradually expanded to form the comparatively small residential sections within Osterley.

Besides Osterley House and Park, the district is also known for one of the London residences of The Sultan of Brunei (Aviary Farm in Windmill Lane).

== Politics ==
Osterley is part of the Brentford and Isleworth constituency for elections to the House of Commons of the United Kingdom.

Osterley is part of the Osterley and Spring Grove ward for elections to Hounslow London Borough Council.

== Sport and Leisure ==
Osterley has a non-League football club CB Hounslow United F.C. who play at the Osterley Sports Ground.

The training ground of Premier League club Brentford is located at 100 Jersey Road, Osterley.

== Demography and housing ==
In the 2011 census, the Osterley ward was recorded as being 30% White British. Other significant ethnic groups were Other Whites (12.8%) and Indians. The proportion who ethnically identify as BAME (Black, Asian and minority Ethnic) was 54.4% of the population.

51.9% of people living in Osterley were born in the U.K. The other most common countries of birth were India (12.7%), Pakistan (2.8%), Somalia (2.2%), Ireland (1.8%), and North Africa (1.3%).

The largest religious affiliations in Isleworth are Christians (39.2%), Muslims (13.8%), Hindus (13.7%), those with no religion (11.9%), and Sikhs (11.8%).

2011 Census Homes
Ward	Detached	Semi-detached	Terraced	Flats and apartments	Caravans/temporary/mobile homes/houseboats	Shared between households
Osterley and Spring Grove	420	1,900	467	1,981	4	24

2011 Census Households
Ward	Population	Households	% Owned outright	% Owned with a loan	hectares
Osterley and Spring Grove	13,031	4,796	29	33	634

== Transport and locale ==
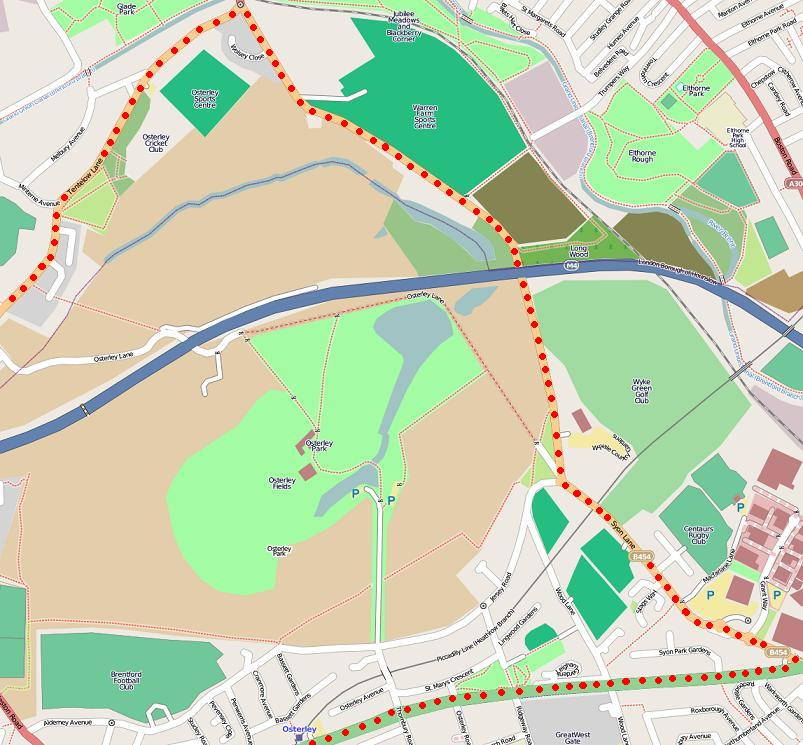
Map of Osterley – Click to enlarge

=== Nearest tube station ===
- Osterley tube station

=== Nearest railway stations ===
- Syon Lane railway station
- Isleworth railway station
