= Kamini Gadhok =

Kamini Gadhok MRCSLT MBE
- Born: March 1961 (age 65)
- Occupation: Chief Executive

Kamini Gadhok MRCSLT MBE (b. 1961) is a British speech and language therapist. From 2000 to 2023, Gadhok served as the Chief Executive of the Royal College of Speech and Language Therapists.

== Early life ==
Gadhok was born in India, the youngest of three sisters, but spent the early part of her childhood in Nairobi, Kenya. Her family emigrated to Nottingham, England in 1966. An academically gifted teenager, Gadhok came across the speech and language therapy profession through a leaflet, and felt a desire to 'give back, help others, particularly vulnerable children who did not have a voice'.

== Speech and Language Therapist ==
Gadhok studied Speech and Language Therapy at the University of Manchester and graduated in 1983. She worked as a speech and language therapist for Nottingham Community Health NHS Trust and was later promoted to locality manager and coordinator for the service's speech and language therapy department. She specialised in bilingualism and led the development of services for people for whom English was an additional language. She established the Asian bilingual co-worker service, the first of its kind in the country. In 1997, Kamini became ethnic health projects coordinator for the NHS and was seconded to the Department of Health to set up the Race Equality Unit, where she was section head until 2000.

== Chief Executive ==
In 2000, Gadhok began working for the RCSLT as the organisation's Professional Director, later becoming their Chief Executive. One of Gadhok's early challenges in this role was leading the speech and language therapy profession through the implementation of Agenda for Change, the NHS grading and pay system, in 2004.

As CEO of RCSLT, Gadhok oversaw the tenures of 12 Chairs of College, including: Flis Parsons, Caroline Sykes, Sue Roulstone, Rosalind Gray Rogers, Mary Turnbull, Maria Luscombe, Hazel Roddam, Bryony Simpson, Morag Dorward, Della Money, Mary Heritage, and Sean Pert.

In 2018, Gadhok advocated for the prioritisation of children's language services by the UK government as a result of the findings of a 10-year impact assessment of the Bercow Report.

In April 2022 Gadhok announced that she would retire from her role as CEO of the RCSLT in March 2023. In October 2022, the RCSLT announced the appointment of Steve Jamieson as Gadhok's successor, taking up the post in March 2023.

From 2007 to 2012 Gadhok served as a director of the National Literacy Trust.

== Awards ==
Gadhok was awarded a Member of the Order of the British Empire in the 2009 Birthday Honours for services to the allied health professions.

In November 2019, alongside RCSLT President Nick Hewer, Gadhok was awarded an honorary degree by Plymouth Marjon University to mark the 25th anniversary of the speech and language therapy degree programme at the university.

In July 2023, Gadhok was made an honorary Doctor of Civil Law by Newcastle University, in recognition of her contribution to the national and international development of speech and language therapy and her efforts to increase equality and diversity within the speech and language therapy profession.
