= Mona Arshi =

British poet and novelist

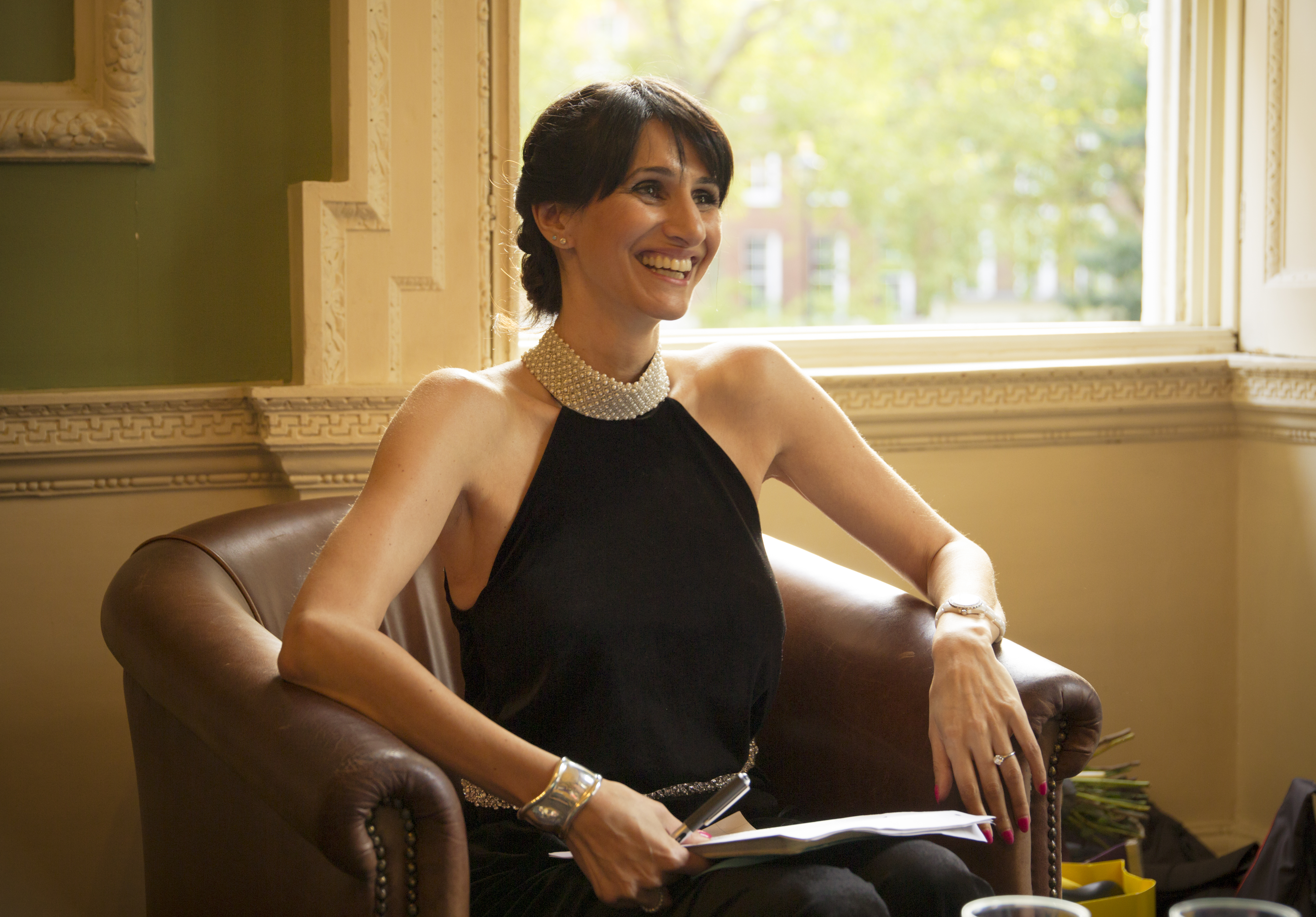
- Arshi in 2019
- Born: London, England
- Education: Lampton Comprehensive School; University College London; University of East Anglia
- Occupations: Poet, novelist, and lawyer
- Writing career
- Language: English
- Notable works: Small Hands (2015), Somebody Loves You (2021)
- Notable awards: Manchester Poetry Prize 2014; Forward Prize for Poetry, Best First Collection (2015)
- Website: monaarshi.com

Mona Arshi is a British poet and novelist. She won the Forward Prize for Poetry, Best First Collection in 2015 for her debut collection, Small Hands. She has also won the Manchester Poetry Prize. Her debut novel, Somebody Loves You, was shortlisted for the Jhalak Prize and the Goldsmiths Prize.

== Biography ==
Arshi was born in West London, England, into an Indian Sikh family from Punjab, and was raised in Hounslow, where she attended Lampton Comprehensive School.

She studied at Guildford College of Law and University College London and the London School of Economics (LSE), where she obtained a master's degree in human rights law in 2002. She trained as a solicitor in the civil liberties law firm JR Jones Solicitors. She then worked for several years as a litigator at the NGO Liberty acting on high-profile judicial review cases including Diane Pretty's "right to die" case, asylum destitution cases and death in custody cases.

Arshi began writing poetry in 2008. After taking some poetry classes at City Lit, she went on to study for an MA in Creative Writing (Poetry) at the University of East Anglia, gaining a distinction in 2010.

She lives in West London.

== Writing career ==
While studying for her MA in Creative Writing at the University of East Anglia, Arshi won the inaugural Magma poetry competition for her poem "Hummingbird" and was a winner in the Troubadour International Competition (2013) for her poem "Bad Day in the Office". Arshi was then selected for The Complete Works mentoring programme, funded by the Arts Council. In 2013, The Huffington Post named her one of "Five Poets to Watch". In 2014, she was joint winner in the Manchester Poetry Prize competition with a portfolio of five poems.

In 2015, she published her debut collection of poems Small Hands with Pavilion Poetry, a new poetry imprint from Liverpool University Press under the editorship of poet and critic Deryn Rees-Jones. The collection includes an elegy sequence for Arshi's brother, Deepak, who died suddenly in 2012, as well as poems inspired by her small children and poems about her own childhood on Hounslow. The book won the Forward Prize for Poetry, Best First Collection in 2015. Poems from the collection were published in The Guardian and The Sunday Times. Her poem "This Morning" appeared on posters across the London Underground, as part of the British Council's "Indian Poems on the Underground" project in 2017.

Arshi went on to judge the Forward Prize for Poetry in 2017 and hosted the Awards with Andrew Marr at the Royal Festival Hall. Arshi has also judged the Magma Poetry Competition and the Outspoken Poetry Prize. She also judged the Manchester Poetry Prize in 2017.

In April 2017, BBC Radio 4 broadcast Arshi's commissioned poem "Odysseus, The Patron Saint of Foreigners?" In 2018, she was asked to read at the First Stuart Hall Public Conversation.

Arshi's second collection, Dear Big Gods, was published in April 2019, also by Pavilion Poetry. This collection continues to address her brother's death and to experiment with form, with prose poems, a sestina and a tanka, and includes poetic responses to Lorca, Emily Dickinson, The Odyssey and The Mahabharata. The title poem and an essay, "On Gods, Human Rights and the Poet", were published in the US magazine POETRY in 2019. In the essay, Arshi comments: "A poem is not a human rights instrument or the pleadings in a court case, nor should it seek to be but one activity that the human rights lawyer and poet share is the restless interrogation of language....Poetry needs to continue to strive to make space for itself and think the unthinkable, the unimaginable on the page."

In 2021, Arshi's debut novel, Somebody Loves You, was published by And Other Stories. Set in suburban London, it tells of a British Indian family whose younger daughter, Ruby, develops selective mutism. In 2022, it was shortlisted for the Jhalak Prize and the Goldsmiths Prize and longlisted for the Desmond Elliott Prize and the Republic of Consciousness Prize. The novel was named book of the week in The Telegraph and This Week magazine.

Arshi was a Fellow Commoner in Creative Arts at Trinity College, Cambridge from 2022 to 2024. She was elected a Fellow of the Royal Society of Literature in 2022.

== Works ==
=== Poetry ===
- Small Hands, 2015 (Liverpool University Press)
- Dear Big Gods, 2019 (Liverpool University Press)
- Mouth, 2025 (Chatto & Windus)

=== Novel ===
- Somebody Loves You, 2021 (And Other Stories)
