= Hounslow and Richmond Community Healthcare NHS Trust =

NHS community trust

- Type: NHS trust
- Established: 1 April 2011
- Headquarters: Teddington, London, England
- Hospitals: Teddington Memorial Hospital
- Staff: 1,244 WTE (2023)

Hounslow and Richmond Community Healthcare NHS Trust was an NHS trust which provided adult and children's community health services. On 1 November 2024, the trust combined with Kingston Hospital NHS Foundation Trust to form Kingston and Richmond NHS Foundation Trust.

== History ==
The trust was established on 1 April 2011 as part of the Transforming Community Services initiative from the community services arm of the then Hounslow and Richmond primary care trusts.

Stephen Swords was chair of the board when it was established until he was succeeded by Sian Bates on 1 February 2020. Sukhvinder Kaur-Stubbs was subsequently appointed Chair in Common at Hounslow and Richmond Community Healthcare NHS Trust and Kingston Hospital NHS Foundation Trust from 1 April 2022.

== Performance ==
It was named by the Health Service Journal as one of the top hundred NHS trusts to work for in 2015. At that time it had 868 full-time equivalent staff and a sickness absence rate of 3.38%. 72% of staff recommend it as a place for treatment and 61% recommended it as a place to work.

Before its closure, the trust employed 1,140 people.

== Services and locations ==
Some of the services offered by the trust included:

Adult services

- Community nursing, therapies, in-patient unit
- Urgent care and walk-in services
- Richmond Rapid Response Team, Hounslow Integrated Community Response Service,
- Community recovery service

Specialist services

- Neurorehabilitation, continence services and continuing care

Children's services

- Paediatric (child development; continuing care, therapies) universal children's services (health visiting, community nursing, Family Nurse Partnership), audiology, Hounslow
- School nursing (from April 2018)
- Childhood immunisations
- Richmond, Kingston, Sutton, Merton, Bromley, Bexley, Lambeth and Southwark

Health and wellbeing

- One You Hounslow
- One You Merton
- Live Well Sutton

It was responsible for Teddington Memorial Hospital.

In Hounslow, it provided services from:

- Bedfont Clinic
- Brentford Health Centre
- Chiswick Health Centre
- Feltham Centre for Health
- Heart of Hounslow Centre for Health
- Heston Health Centre
- Hounslow House
- Hounslow Urgent Care Centre
- Therapies Centre (O Block – West Middlesex Hospital)

In Richmond, it provided services from:

- Centre House
- Ham Clinic
- Richmond Rehab Unit
- Teddington Health and Social Care Centre
- Teddington Memorial Hospital
- Urgent Treatment Centre at Teddington Memorial Hospital
- Whitton Corner Health and Social Care Centre
