= Pamela Enderby =

British speech and language therapist (born 1949)

Pamela Mary Enderby OBE
- Born: 25 January 1949 (age 77)
- Occupations: Speech and Language Therapist

Academic background
- Education: University of Bristol (PhD)

Academic work
- Institutions: Frenchay Hospital; University of Sheffield; South Yorkshire Health Authority

Pamela Mary Enderby OBE, FRCSLT (born 25 January 1949) is a British speech and language therapist, and Professor of Community Rehabilitation at the University of Sheffield.

== Career ==
In 1975 Enderby became Head of the Speech Therapy Department at Frenchay Hospital. In 1983 she gained her PhD from Bristol University Medical School. In 1986 she became Head of the Frenchay District Speech Therapy Services.

Enderby was chair and Vice President of the Royal College of Speech and Language Therapists, of which she is a Fellow, in 1993–1994 and President of the Society for Research and Rehabilitation from 1994 to 1996. She has led research programmes into various aspects of therapy, particularly related to models of delivery, and effectiveness and outcomes. She is currently non-executive Director of South Yorkshire Health Authority and chairperson of the Regional Older Peoples´ Task Force. She is on the editorial advisory board for the International Journal of Language & Communication Disorders. Enderby is an emeritus Professor of Community Rehabilitation at The School of Health and Related Research at The University of Sheffield. In June 2019 Enderby was the keynote speaker at the International Journal of Language & Communication Disorders Annual Lecture.

=== Awards ===
In 1986 Enderby was awarded the Jacques Parisot Foundation Fellowship Award presented by the World Health Organization. Enderby was awarded an Honorary Doctorate from the University of West England in December 2000 in recognition of her outstanding contribution to speech and language therapy and to rehabilitation research.

Enderby was appointed an Officer of the Order of the British Empire in the 2018 Queen's Birthday Honours.

Enderby was awarded the honorary degree of Doctor of Science by the University of Sheffield in 2022.

=== Equal pay activism ===
Enderby was the lead claimant in a landmark legal case for equal pay in the NHS (see Enderby v Frenchay Health Authority). In 1986 she argued that her work and that of her colleagues, mostly women, was of equal value to clinical psychologists, who were predominantly men. Her employers said the difference in pay could be justified because the two groups bargain separately. This claim launched the second longest group action for equal pay for equal work since a 1985 claim by female canteen workers against British Coal. The case involved twenty-six court appearances (including at the European Court of Justice), 2,000 applicants and sixteen test cases.

The resulting compensation cost the government approximately £30 million in back-pay. The Enderby case led the then Labour government to institute a review of pay and grading scales throughout the health service in the form of the Agenda for Change.

== Select publications ==
- Sproson, L., Pownall, S., Enderby, P., & Freeman, J. 2017. "Combined electrical stimulation and exercise for swallow rehabilitation post-stroke: a pilot randomized control trial". International Journal of Language & Communication Disorders.
- Judge, S., Enderby, P., Creer, S., & John, A. 2017. "Provision of powered communication aids in the United Kingdom". Augmentative and Alternative Communication, 1–7.
- Hargreaves, S.A., Hawley, M.S., Haywood, A. & Enderby, P.M. 2017. "Informing the Design of “Lifestyle Monitoring” Technology for the Detection of Health Deterioration in Long-Term Conditions: A Qualitative Study of People Living With Heart Failure". Journal of Medical Internet Research 19(6).
- Gladman, J., Buckell, J., Young, J., Smith, A., Hulme, C., Saggu, S., Godfrey, M., Enderby, P., Teale, E., Longo, R., Gannon, B., Holditch, C., Eardley, H. & Tucker, H. 2017. "Understanding the Models of Community Hospital rehabilitation Activity (MoCHA): a mixed-methods study" BMJ Open 7.
- Enderby, P. 2017. "Speech pathology as the MasterChef: Getting the right ingredients and stirring the pot". International Journal of Speech-Language Pathology 19(1), 232–236. doi:10.1080/17549507.2017.1287219.
