= Watermans Arts Centre =

Arts organisation based in Hounslow, London

Watermans Arts Centre, commonly known as Watermans, is a cultural organisation based in the London Borough of Hounslow, England. Formed in the 1970s, it operated a physical arts centre on the River Thames in Brentford from the mid-1980s until its closure in April 2024. The organisation continues to curate outdoor performances, digital art projects, and community programs across the borough while working toward securing a new permanent facility."About Watermans". Watermans.

Watermans receives grant funding from Arts Council England and the London Borough of Hounslow."About Watermans". Watermans.

== History ==
=== Brentford venue (1980s–2024) ===
Hounslow Arts Trust was established in 1975 to fundraise for a dedicated arts venue in Brentford. Construction was funded through a combination of community fundraising and a planning agreement with commercial developers. The venue opened in the 1980s equipped with a cinema, a theatre, an art gallery, and two studio spaces overlooking Kew Gardens.

Director John Baraldi managed the venue's initial opening, which featured a inaugural performance by sitar player Ravi Shankar. Over subsequent decades, the venue hosted varied cultural programming:

- **Music:** The venue hosted early rave and acid jazz events during the late 1980s, including a 1987 club night involving DJ Gilles Peterson. On 19 August 1988, alternative rock group Spacemen 3 recorded their live album Dreamweapon at the venue during a performance paired with a screening of Wings of Desire.
- **Literature:** Author Robert Rankin served as writer-in-residence during the 1980s, hosting regular poetry sessions while authoring elements of The Brentford Trilogy.
- **British Asian Arts:** In the 1990s, the venue prioritized South Asian and British Asian theatre and comedy, providing an early performance platform for artists such as Sanjeev Bhaskar and Meera Syal.

=== Closure and current operations ===
On 20 March 2024, the Hounslow Arts Trust announced that the Brentford building would close permanently on 11 April 2024 due to unsustainable operational costs."Frequently Asked Questions – Watermans Public Statement" (PDF). Watermans. 20 March 2024.

Following the venue's closure, the trust transitioned to an off-site operational model. It continues to manage community initiatives—including the Arts Council England-funded Creative People and Places project—and presents digital media installations and public events while working alongside local authorities to establish a replacement venue in central Brentford."About Watermans". Watermans.

== Bell Square ==
In 2014, Watermans collaborated with the London Borough of Hounslow to establish Bell Square, an open-air performance space in central Hounslow. Watermans curates the site's annual schedule of free outdoor events, ranging from circus acts and street theatre to dance and live music from international performance companies."Global Streets Partners – Bell Square". Global Streets.

== See also ==
- Bell Square
- Creative People and Places
- London Borough of Hounslow
