= Hounslow Civic Centre =

Municipal building in London, England

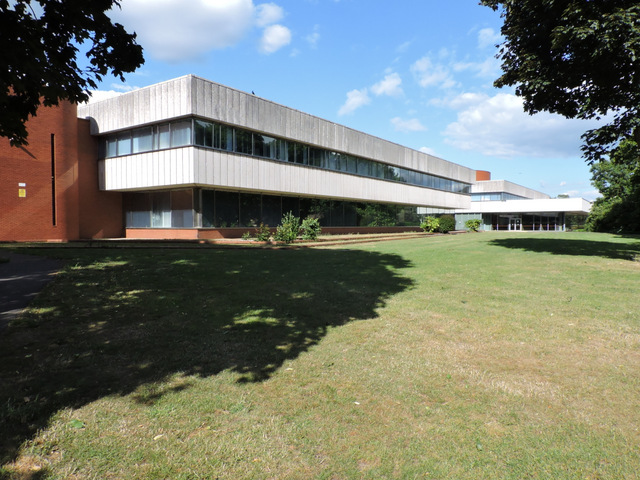
- Hounslow Civic Centre

- Shown in Hounslow
- 51.4747°N 0.3682°W
- Location: Hounslow

History
- Built: 1976
- Demolished: 2019

Site notes
- Architect: George Trevett

Hounslow Civic Centre was a municipal facility at Lampton in Hounslow, London. The building provided accommodation for many of the offices of Hounslow London Borough Council.

== History ==
In the early 20th century the Municipal Borough of Heston and Isleworth had been based at council offices in Treaty Road. In the early 1960s, civic leaders decided this arrangement would be inadequate for their needs in the context of the impending creation of the London Borough of Hounslow and decided to purchase land for a purpose-built civic centre: the site selected for the new facility, located just north of Lampton Park on Lampton Road, had previously been open land.

Once the London Borough of Hounslow had been formed in 1965, the new civic leaders proceeded to procure a new building. Construction work, which was carried out by M J Gleeson at a cost of £4.9 million, started in 1972. The new building, which was designed by the borough architect, George Trevett, was officially opened on 17 November 1975. The design involved four low-rise glass and concrete pavilions connected by a central spine containing the main staircase and was set in extensive landscaping designed by Jakobsen Landscape Architects. Three of the pavilions contained open plan space for council officers and their departments while the south-eastern pavilion, sometimes referred to as the "civic pavilion", contained at its centre a twelve-sided council chamber which appeared at roof level as a drum. The main frontage of the civic pavilion, like the other pavilions, featured a series of glass entrance doors on the ground floor; there were layers of continuous stone facing panels above and below a continuous band of glazing on the first floor.

After the civic centre became uneconomic to operate, the council entered into a development agreement with a joint venture of Notting Hill Genesis and Bouygues Development for work on the first phase of a residential development, on an adjacent site, which started in December 2016. Following the completion of the council's relocation to its new headquarters, Hounslow House, at Bath Road in April 2019, the main building was decommissioned and the site was handed over for the second phase of the residential development in summer 2019.

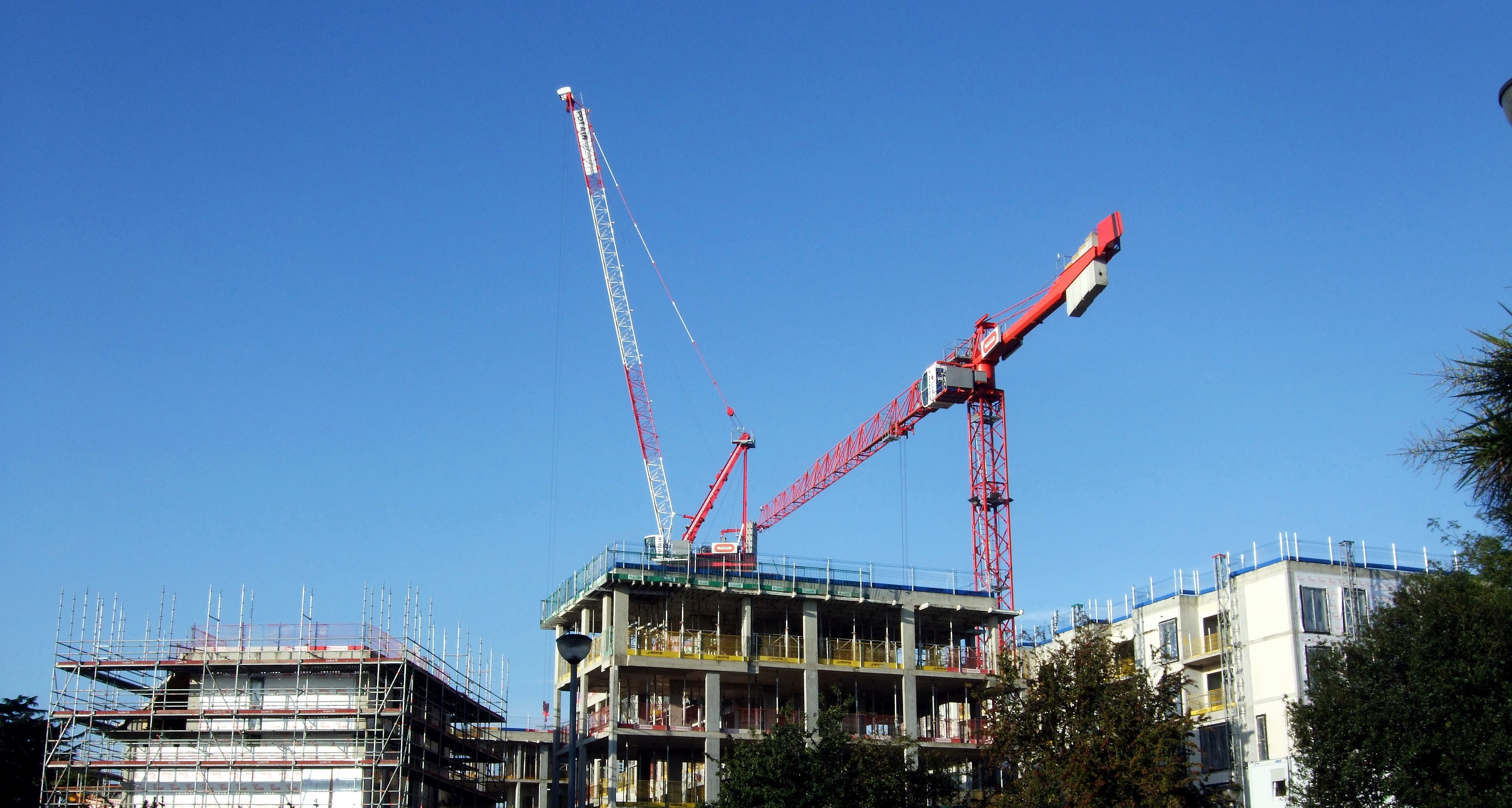
Residential development under construction at the former Hounslow Civic Centre site in 2017
