= Kingston Hospital NHS Foundation Trust =

Healthcare trust in England

Kingston Hospital NHS Foundation Trust ran Kingston Hospital, an acute NHS hospital in Kingston upon Thames, South West London. The Trust was licensed as an NHS Foundation Trust by Monitor (NHS) from 1 May 2013.The Trust was rated 'outstanding' by the CQC. On 1 November 2024, the trust combined with Hounslow and Richmond Community Healthcare NHS Trust to form Kingston and Richmond NHS Foundation Trust.

== Services ==
The Trust served approximately 320,000 people in Kingston, Richmond, Roehampton, Putney, East Elmbridge and other parts of South West London. It directly employed some 2,750 staff with another 300 staff employed by contractors but working on behalf of the Trust.

The trust broke from the national pay agreement in August 2015 by giving a 1% pay rise to its 22 senior non-clinical staff – those earning above £57,069 – in line with the award for the rest of the staff. The trust did not qualify for London weighting and was worried that it would lose senior managers.

== Performance ==
It spent 9% of its total turnover on agency staff in 2014/5.

The trust relied on a working capital facility arrangement made to qualify for Foundation Trust status with Lloyds Bank to pay staff each month from April 2016 until it negotiated a £10 million loan from the Department of Health in 2017.

== See also ==
- List of hospitals in England
- List of NHS trusts
