= Susan John =

Susan John may refer to:

- Susan V. John (1957–2021), American politician
- Sue John (born 1953), a.k.a. Dame Susan John, British headteacher
