= Kingston and Richmond NHS Foundation Trust =

Healthcare trust in England

- Type: NHS foundation trust
- Established: 1 November 2024
- Headquarters: Kingston upon Thames, London, England
- Hospitals: Kingston Hospital; Teddington Memorial Hospital
- Website: www.kingstonandrichmond.nhs.uk

Kingston and Richmond NHS Foundation Trust is an NHS foundation trust which runs Kingston Hospital and Teddington Memorial Hospital.

== History ==
The trust was established on 1 November 2024 by the merger of Kingston Hospital NHS Foundation Trust and Hounslow and Richmond Community Healthcare NHS Trust

== Facilities ==
The trust manages Dorking Community Hospital and Kingston Hospital.

The trust refurbished the pharmacy in Kingston Hospital in 2025.
