= Bryony Simpson =

Bryony Simpson FRCSLT MBE
- Occupations: Speech Therapist; Chairperson

Bryony Simpson FRCSLT MBE is a British speech and language therapist.

== Career ==
Simpson qualified as a speech and language therapist in 1979, and initially worked in adult rehabilitation services at Northwick Park Hospital, London. She moved to Grimsby in 1980 and worked across services in North Lincolnshire and Hull.

In 1998, Simpson completed a Masters in Professional Studies in Speech and Language Therapy at Leeds Beckett University. Following a recognition of limited paediatric speech and language therapy provision in the North of England, Simpson wrote a year-long BTEC Extended Diploma qualification for speech and language therapy assistants, upskilling hundreds of assistants in the North.

Simpson was Chair of the Royal College of Speech and Language Therapists between 2011 and 2014. Towards the end of her tenure in this role, Simpson requested that the 2014 RCSLT scientific conference be held in Leeds in order to showcase and celebrate the work of Leeds Beckett University and the North of England.

On 20 July 2015, Simpson was awarded an honorary doctorate from Leeds Beckett University. Simpson was awarded an MBE for services to speech and language in the 2015 New Year Honours.

Simpson retired in 2016.
