= Royal College of Speech and Language Therapists =

British professional organization

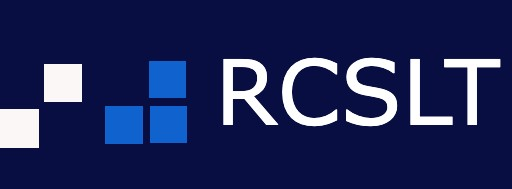
- Predecessor: College of Speech Therapists
- Founded: 1945
- Legal status: Charity
- Location: 2-3 White Hart Yard, London, SE1 1NX, United Kingdom
- Members: 20,000 (2022-2023)
- Key people: Patron: The Duchess of Edinburgh; President: Nick Hewer; CEO: Steve Jamieson; Current Chair of the Board of Trustees: Dr Sean Pert
- Website: www.rcslt.org

The Royal College of Speech and Language Therapists (abbreviated as RCSLT) is the professional body for speech and language therapists in the United Kingdom and is a registered charity. It was established on 6 January 1945 to promote the study of speech therapy in the UK, to seek improvement and maintain a high standard of knowledge and to unite all members of the profession. The RCSLT's current patron is the Duchess of Edinburgh. The RCSLT has offices in Edinburgh, Belfast, Cardiff and London.

== History ==
The RCSLT was founded in 1945 as the College of Speech Therapists (CST), after the amalgamation of the Association of Speech Therapists and the British Society of Speech Therapists in 1944. In 1945, CST fellows and licentiates were granted application to the Register of Medical Auxiliaries. By 1955, the College had withdrawn from the register and published its own member directory. Its first patron, in 1948, was King George VI, who received speech therapy for his stammer. Queen Elizabeth the Queen Mother continued this support after his death in 1952 and became the college's patron in 1959.

In 1990, speech therapists changed their name and title to "speech and language therapists". The college was awarded the right to call itself the 'Royal College' of Speech and Language Therapists in 1995. The Duchess of Edinburgh (the then Countess of Wessex) became the RCSLT patron in 2003 after the death of the Queen Mother in 2002.

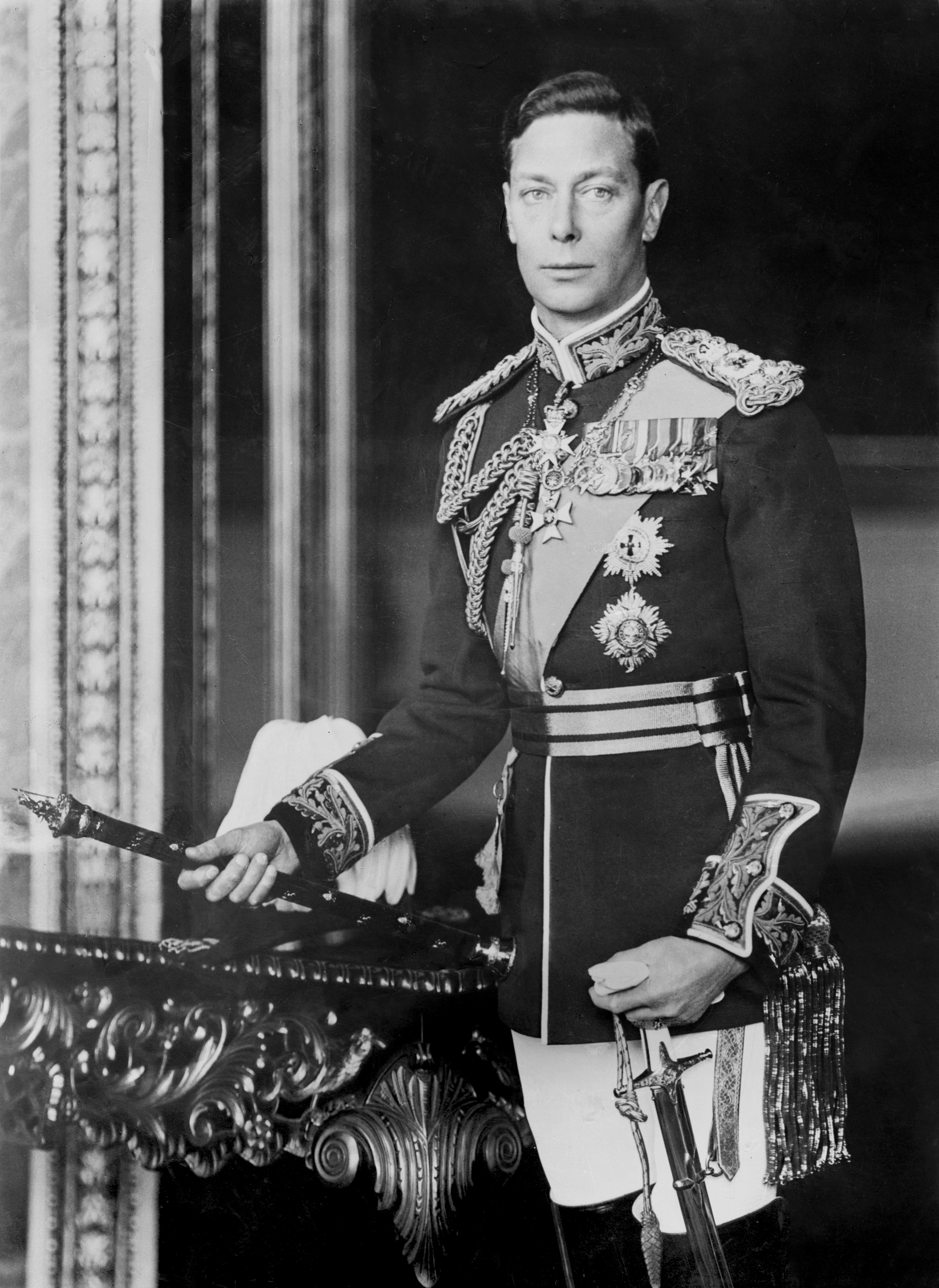
King George VI received speech therapy for his stammer.

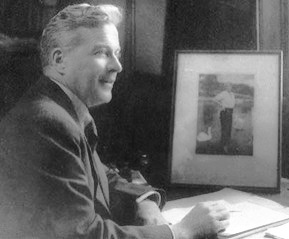
Australian speech therapist Lionel Logue helped King George VI manage his stammer.

=== Presidents ===
- Sir George Cox (?–2019)
- Nick Hewer (1 April 2019–current)

=== Chief Executive ===
Steve Jamieson MSc, BSc (Hons) RN became Chief Executive in April 2023 following the retirement of Kamini Gadhok after 23 years as RCSLT CEO

== Work ==
The RCSLT is a professional membership body which promotes for the public benefit the art and science of speech and language therapy, meaning care for individuals with communication, swallowing, eating and drinking difficulties.

Its stated professional aims are: to provide leadership and set professional standards for speech therapists in the UK; to facilitate and promote research into the field of speech and language therapy; to promote better education and training of speech and language therapists; to provide information for members and the public about speech and language therapy.

=== Equal pay activism ===
One of the RCSLT's members, Dr. Pamela Enderby, was the lead claimant in a landmark legal case for equal pay in the NHS (see Enderby v Frenchay Health Authority). In 1986, she argued that her work and that of her colleagues, mostly women, was of equal value to clinical psychologists, who were predominantly men. Her employers said the difference in pay could be justified because the two groups bargain separately. This claim launched the second-longest group action for equal pay for equal work since a 1985 claim by female canteen workers against British Coal. The case involved twenty-six court appearances (including at the European Court of Justice), 2,000 applicants and sixteen test cases.

The resulting compensation cost the government approximately £30 million in back-pay. The Enderby case led the then Labour government to institute a review of pay and grading scales throughout the health service in the form of the Agenda for Change.

== Membership ==
The membership in March 2022 was 20,000. Of this figure, 14,461 were UK practising members, 908 were UK nonpracticing members, 448 were retired, 314 were overseas, 1,105 were students, and 186 were associates. The total figure had fallen from 17,468 at the end of March 2018.

In a 2018 survey of its membership (to which 2,700 responded), the RCSLT found that the mean age of its members was 42 and that 73% were employed by the NHS; the remainder worked in independent practice (11%), schools (3%), local authorities (3%), universities (3%), and in other areas (7%).

Membership of the RCSLT
Year	Total
2014	15,883
2015	16,681
2016	17,083
2017	17,083
2018	17,468
2019	17,422

=== Finances ===
In the financial year 2016–2017 the college had income of over £4.2 million and expenditure of over £4.3 million, of which £3.3 million (79%) derived from membership income.

== Publications ==
The monthly membership magazine, Bulletin, is the official magazine of the RCSLT. The magazine features the latest news, clinical articles, job adverts and other advertising.

The International Journal of Language & Communication Disorders is the RCSLT's international research journal.

== Awards ==
Launched in 2010, the Giving Voice Awards celebrate organisations and individuals that have campaigned to highlight how speech and language therapy transforms lives and/or others who have made a significant contribution to improving the lives of people with communication and/or swallowing needs.

The Voice Box awards are an annual joke-telling competition for primary school children organised by the RCSLT. In the 2018-19 competition over 5,000 schoolchildren took part in the competition, and ten finalists took part in a live final in London.

The RCSLT elects members annually for its Fellowship Award, which recognises speech and language therapists and speech and language therapy assistants who have demonstrated the impact of their work for service users and/or the profession, beyond what would be expected from their core role and job purpose.
