= Della Money =

Della Money FRCSLT
- Occupations: Speech Therapist; Chairperson

Academic background
- Education: De Montfort University
- Thesis: (1997)

Della Money FRCSLT is a speech and language therapist and Chairperson of the Royal College of Speech and Language Therapists. Money is currently a consultant speech and language therapist with Nottinghamshire Healthcare NHS Trust.

== Select publications ==
- Money, D. 1997. "A comparison of three approaches to delivering a speech and language therapy service to people with learning disabilities", European Journal of Disorders of Communication 32 (4),
- Money, D. 1999. "Satisfaction for All: A Framework for Assessing Life Satisfaction for All People with Learning Disabilities", British Journal of Learning Difficulties 27 (2), 52-57. doi:10.1111/j.1468-3156.1999.tb00086.x.
- Money D. 2015. "Five Good Communication Standards in practice: two years on". RCSLT Bulletin 762, 12-15.
