= Hanworth Road drill hall, Hounslow =

Hanworth Road drill hall
- Hounslow
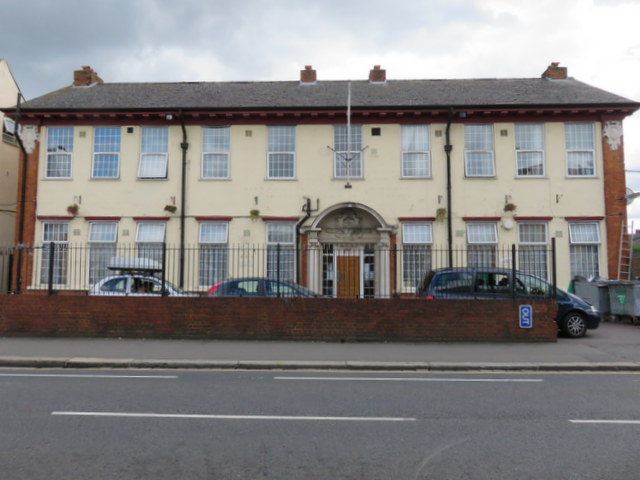
- Hanworth Road drill hall

Site information
- Type: Drill hall

Location
- Location within Greater London
- Coordinates: 51.46494°N 0.36426°W

Site history
- Built: c.1902
- Built for: War Office
- In use: c.1902-Present

The Hanworth Road drill hall is a former military installation in Hounslow, London.

== History ==
The building was designed as the headquarters of the 2nd Volunteer Battalion, The Middlesex Regiment and was completed in around 1902. This unit evolved to become the 8th Battalion, The Middlesex Regiment in 1908. The battalion was mobilised at the drill hall in August 1914 before being deployed to the Western Front.

The battalion converted to become the 11th (Middlesex) Battalion, The Parachute Regiment in 1947, but converted back to become the 8th Battalion, The Middlesex Regiment again in 1956 and was re-numbered as the 5th Battalion, The Middlesex Regiment in 1961. Following the cut-backs in 1967, the drill hall was decommissioned and converted for use as a hotel. The building was renamed the Treaty Lodge Hotel, presumably after the Treaty of Vereeniging, which was signed in May 1902.
