= Bell Square =

Public square in Hounslow, London, England

Coordinates: 51.467°N 0.366°W

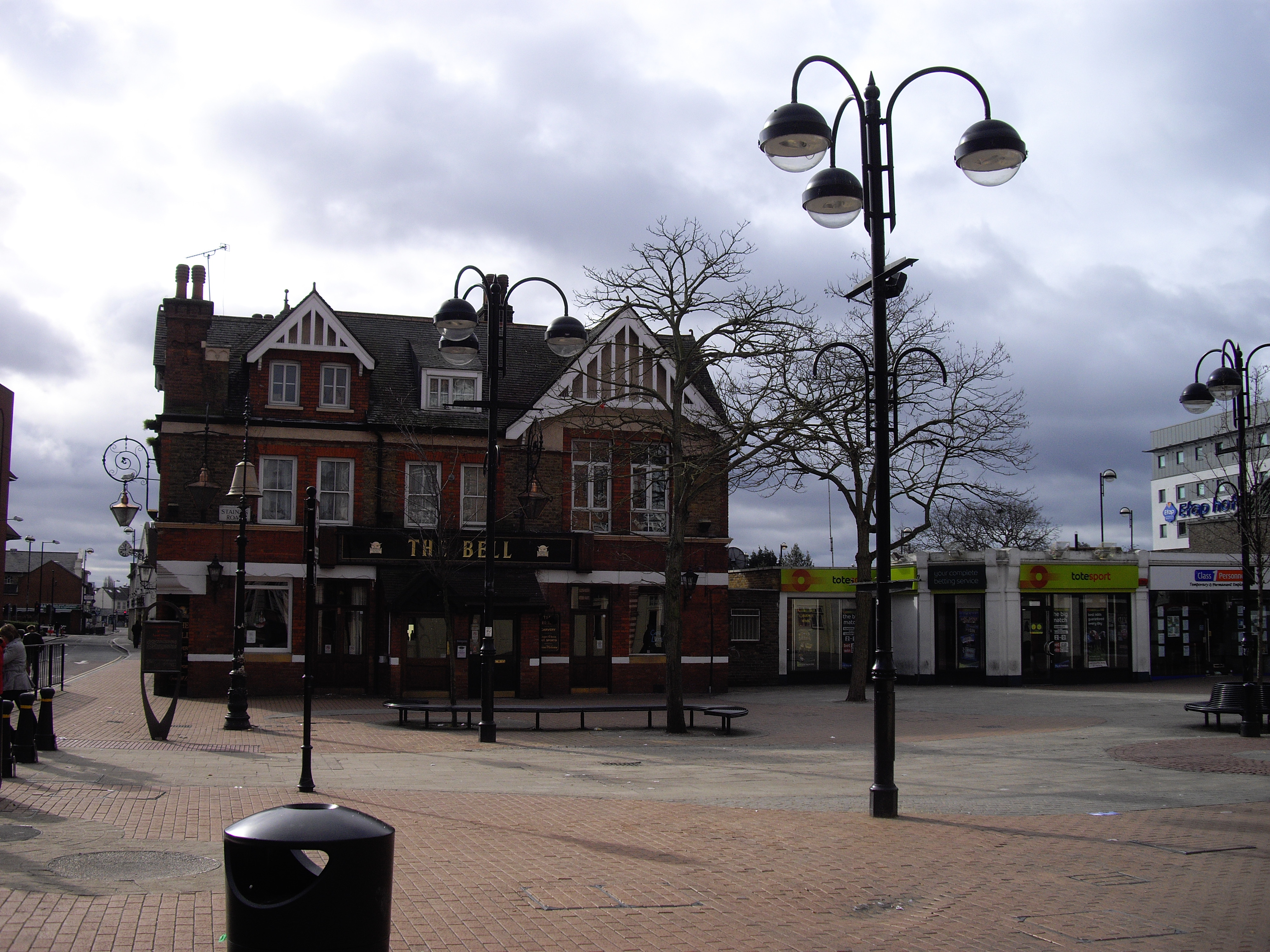
The site of what would become Bell Square, in 2010, with The Bell public house behind

Bell Square is an outdoor performance space in the London Borough of Hounslow. The space in Hounslow town centre was unveiled in 2014, following five years of collaborative development between Hounslow Council and the Watermans Arts Centre.

== Development ==
In 2009, the London Borough of Hounslow, together with Watermans Arts Centre, began to devise an outdoor arts programme for Hounslow Town Centre. Initially, a few events were staged to gauge whether the idea would be sustainable, with continued positive feedback and attendance convincing both parties to commit to a dedicated outdoor performance space in 2012.

Throughout the development of Bell Square, London Borough of Hounslow sought out Watermans to provide specialist advice in relation to the design and development of the location, along with technical specifications relating to equipment.

== Performances ==
The launch event to celebrate the completion of Bell Square was held in June 2014, with the internationally recognized French theatre company Bilbobasso performing Polar, drawing a large audience to the venue on opening night. Following the success of the opening weekend, performances were staged at Bell Square fortnightly on Saturdays from July through to December 2014; creating the opportunity for audiences to view sixteen different performances for free. Over the period, both regional and international acts were attracted to perform at Bell Square. Dance acts such as the Catalonia based group Mar Gomez performing the dance piece Heart Wash; which promised 'to describe through dance the unlikely passion between a strong woman in an arid wilderness and a man adrift amid endless mountains of washing', along with the domestically based act Dream Engine, who performed their unique Conedancers.
