= Lampton =

Area of Hounslow, London, England

Coordinates: 51.478109°N 0.363268°W

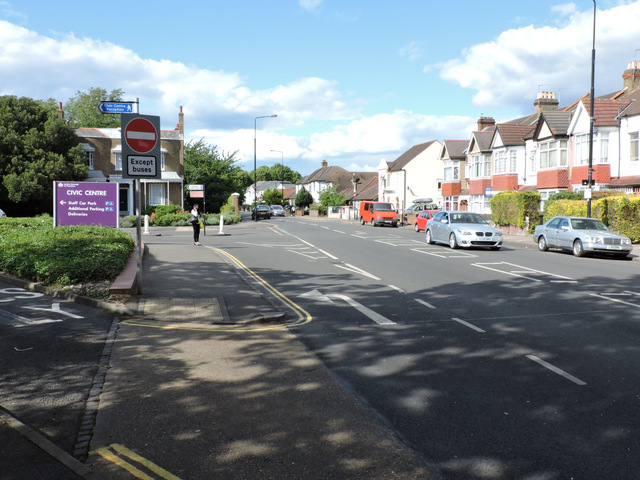
- Lampton Road in 2015

- Location within Greater London
- London borough: Hounslow
- Ceremonial county: Greater London
- Region: London
- Country: England
- Sovereign state: United Kingdom
- Post town: HOUNSLOW
- Postcode district: TW3
- Dialling code: 020
- Police: Metropolitan
- Fire: London
- Ambulance: London
- London Assembly: South West

Lampton is a small area of Hounslow located on the Great West Road in the London Borough of Hounslow, between Hounslow town centre and Heston. Its name derives from the Old English for 'lamb farm.'

Lampton was traditionally the property of the Bulstrodes (lords of the manor of Hounslow) from the 18th century on; their plans to create grand housing along the Lampton Road in 1881 were unsuccessful, and the area remained a small, primarily-agricultural hamlet until the late 19th century. The area became built-up as a result of the extension of what is now the Piccadilly line to Hounslow.

The area gives its name to Lampton School, Lampton Road and Lampton Park.

== Lampton Park ==
Lampton Park is located northwest of Hounslow Central tube station. The park is divided into two main areas, with playing fields to the north and a more formal park to the south. It includes hard-standing tennis courts, a children's playground, flower and shrub beds, a small pond and a memorial garden. There is also a nature area which includes native woodlands and a wildflower meadow.

The park was opened in 1930, and in 1951 a Sarsen Stone that had been unearthed at a gravel works in Heston in 1926 was installed in the park. Lampton Park was one of the parks used for the Charter Celebrations in October 1932 when the Urban District Council (UDC) became a Borough Council.

== Gallery ==
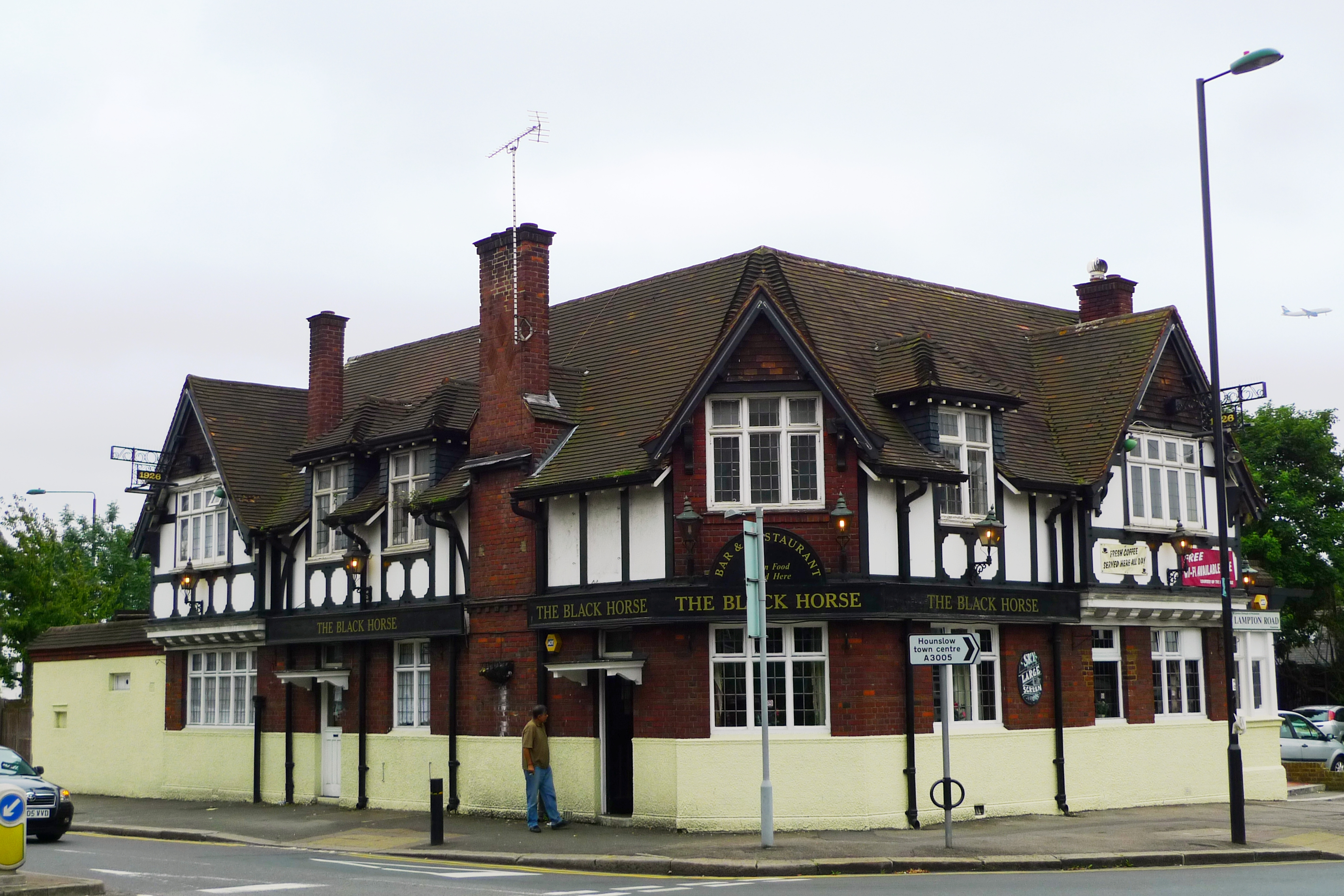
The Black Horse pub, Lampton Road in 2012

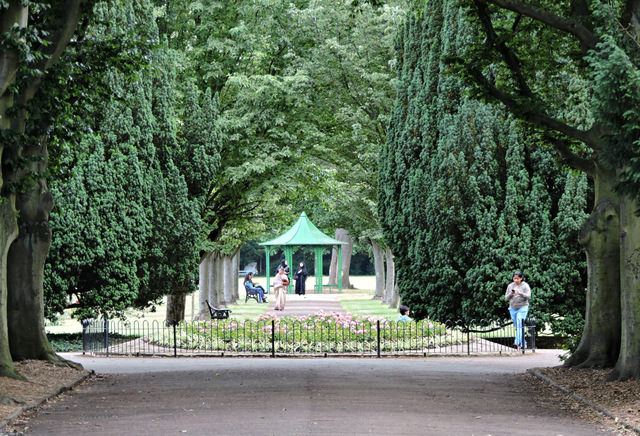
Lampton Park in 2015

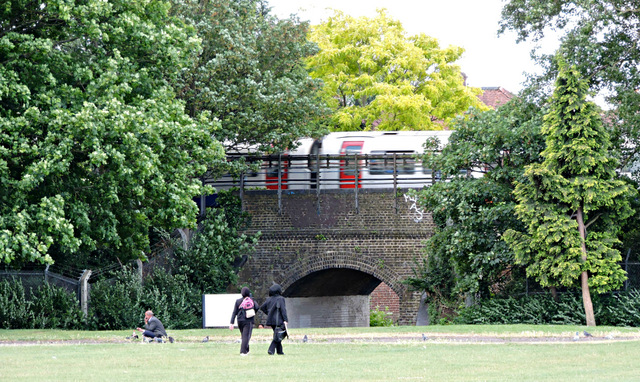
Piccadilly Line train (1973 Stock) visible from Lampton park

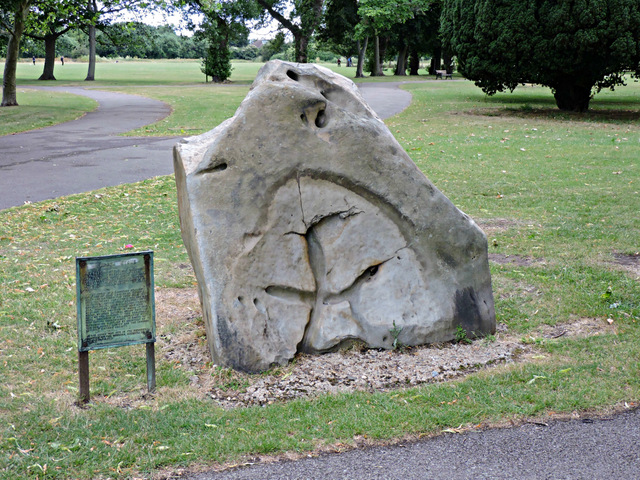
Sarsen Stone in Lampton Park
