= International Journal of Language & Communication Disorders =

- Discipline: Speech and language pathology
- Language: English
- Edited by: Clare McCann, Jill Titterington

Publication details
- Former names: British Journal of Disorders of Communication; European Journal of Disorders of Communication
- History: 1966-present
- Publisher: Wiley-Blackwell
- Frequency: Bimonthly
- Impact factor: 1.504 (2018)

Standard abbreviations
- ISO 4: Int. J. Lang. Commun. Disord.

Indexing
- CODEN: IJLDFI
- ISSN: 1368-2822 (print); 1460-6984 (web)
- LCCN: 98657724
- OCLC no.: 38452377

Links
- Journal homepage; Online archive

The International Journal of Language & Communication Disorders is a peer-reviewed medical journal that covers topics relevant to speech and language disorders and speech and language therapy. Article types published are research reports, reviews, discussions, and clinical fora. It is the official journal of the Royal College of Speech and Language Therapists. The journal is published by Wiley-Blackwell and edited by Professor Clare McCann and Dr Jill Titterington. The journal was established in 1966 and has a 2018 impact factor of 1.504. The journal is available online and is published 6 times a year.

The movie The King's Speech has caused much awareness about stuttering. In response to this, a virtual issue of the journal was produced on the theme of The King's Speech and stuttering research.
