= Hounslow House =

Municipal building in London, England

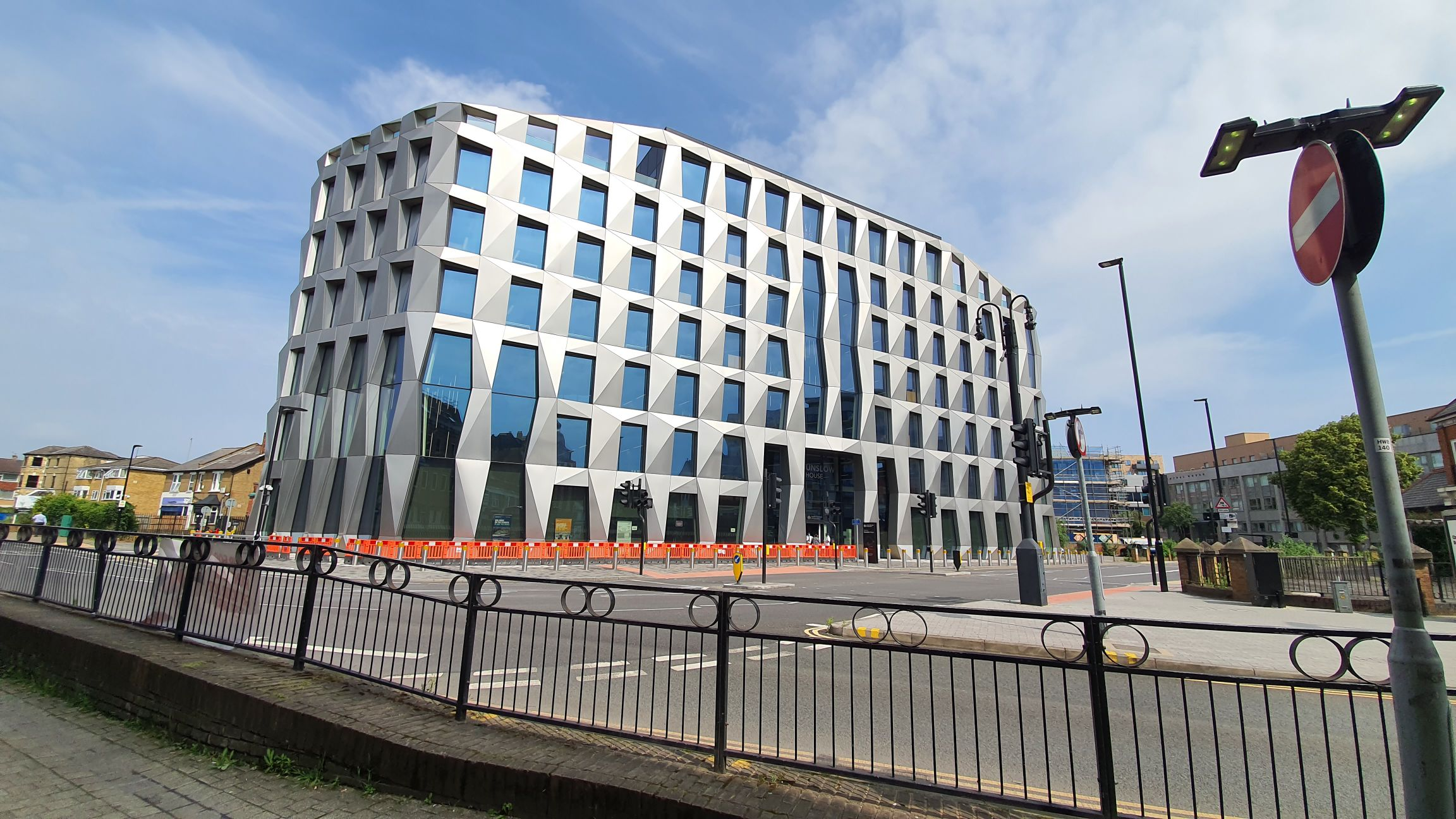
- Hounslow House

- Shown in Hounslow
- 51.4686°N 0.3675°W
- Location: Hounslow

History
- Built: 2017-2019

Site notes
- Architect: Sheppard Robson
- Architectural style: Postmodern style

Hounslow House is a municipal facility in Bath Road, Hounslow, London. The building is the headquarters of Hounslow London Borough Council.

== History ==
After Hounslow Civic Centre became uneconomic to operate, Hounslow London Borough Council decided to procure a smaller facility which would be located in the centre of the borough and more accessible to the public. The site they selected on Bath Road had previously been occupied by a car park. Linkcity were appointed the developer for the site in January 2017.

Construction of the new facility, to be known as Hounslow House, began in November 2016. It was designed by Sheppard Robson in the postmodern style, built by Bouygues Construction at a cost of £66 million and became available for occupation in April 2019. Approximately 1,300 employees were relocated during the move. The new building was officially opened by the Mayor of London, Sadiq Khan, on 1 May 2019.

Hounslow Library, which had been based in the Treaty Centre, relocated to the new building as part of the development.

== Architecture ==
The design involves a symmetrical main frontage with sixteen glazed bays, separated by geometric shapes made from anodised aluminium, facing Lampton Road. The building, which measures 16,000 square metres (170,000 sq ft), is seven storeys high. The ground floor is occupied by public meeting rooms; the library and registrar's office as well as the new adult education classrooms, are on the first floor; the offices of the council officers and their departments are on the second, third, fourth and fifth floors, while the council chamber is on the top floor. Hounslow Clinical Commissioning Group and the Metropolitan Police also have customer access points in the new building.

The design was highly commended in the borough-led projects category of the London Planning Awards in January 2020.
