= Kingston Hospital =

Hospital in London, England

- Kingston and Richmond NHS Foundation Trust
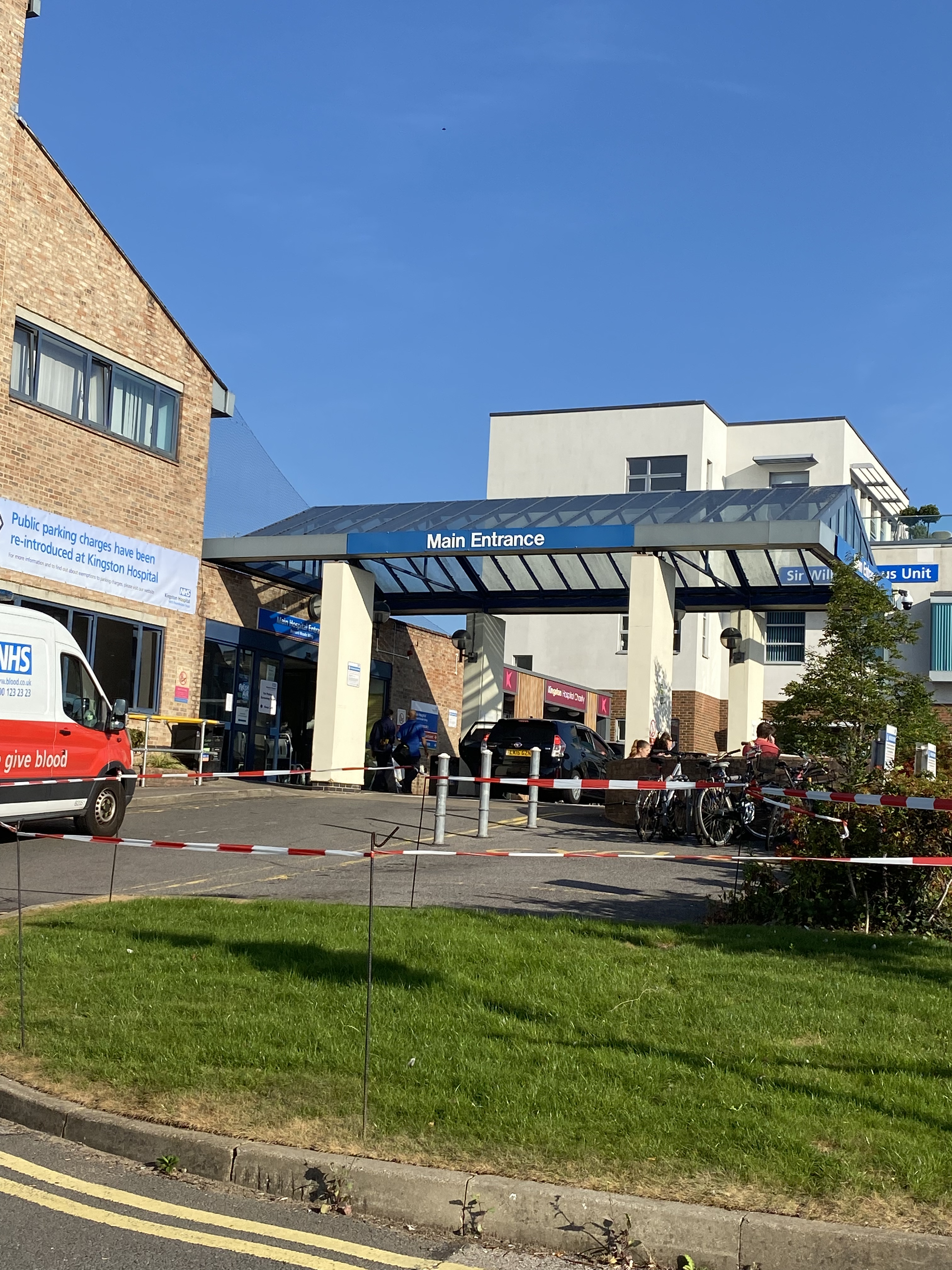
- Kingston Hospital main entrance

- Location within Kingston upon Thames

Geography
- Location: Kingston upon Thames, London, England
- Coordinates: 51.4145°N 0.2816°W

Organisation
- Care system: NHS England
- Type: District General
- Affiliated university: St George's, University of London; Kingston University

Services
- Emergency department: Yes
- Beds: 520

History
- Founded: 1843

Links
- Website: www.kingstonandrichmond.nhs.uk
- Lists: Hospitals in England

Kingston Hospital is an acute hospital in Kingston upon Thames, London, England. It is managed by the Kingston and Richmond NHS Foundation Trust. It has an Accident & Emergency Unit, a popular Maternity unit, and an STD clinic known as the Wolverton Centre.

== History ==
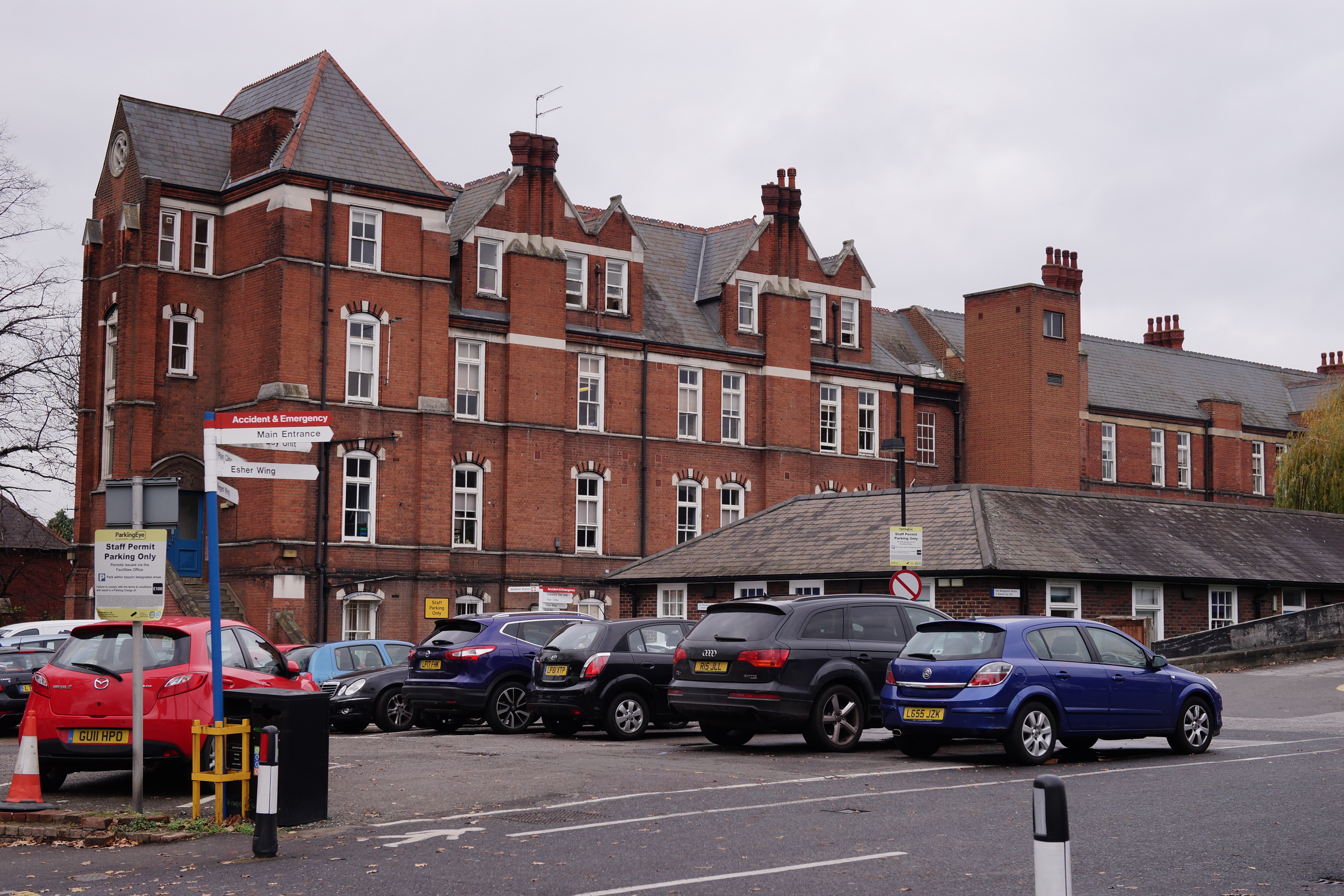
The Regents Wing is a surviving part of the Kingston Workhouse. It opened in 1868 and is planned to be demolished.

The hospital has its origins in a workhouse infirmary built in 1843. A larger infirmary was built to the southwest of the workhouse in 1868 and a nurses' home was built to the north of the workhouse in 1897. The infirmary was separated from the workhouse and was renamed the Kingston Infirmary in 1902. It became the Kingston and District Hospital in 1920 and a larger nurses' home was opened by the Duchess of York in 1928. The hospital joined the National Health Service in 1948 and began to redevelop the site the following year.

A new outpatients department was opened by Princess Alexandra in 1963, a new medical centre was opened by Enoch Powell, Minister of Health in 1962 and Kenley Ward was opened by Professor Sir Max Rosenheim, President of the Royal College of Physicians, in 1969. The Esher Wing opened in 1976, the Bernard Meade Wing was opened by Princess Alexandra in 1992 and the Rowan Bentall Wing was opened, also by Princess Alexandra, in 1994.

A new surgical centre was procured under a Private Finance Initiative contract in May 2004. The surgical centre, which was built by Costain at a cost of £33 million, opened in June 2007.

In June 2008, the Trust opened the Sir William Rous Unit, for those with cancer or concerned they might have cancer. The unit is run in partnership between Kingston Hospital, the Royal Marsden Hospital and Macmillan Cancer Support to provide care for patients with cancer.

== Services ==
The Coombe Wing is a private patient unit on the site which was operated by BMI Healthcare but the contract was taken over by One Healthcare in 2018.

== Transport ==
Kingston Hospital is close to Norbiton railway station and is on the A308. It is serviced by several bus routes (57, 213, K2, K3 and K4), primarily from Kingston upon Thames.
