= Enderby v Frenchay Health Authority =

- Court: European Court of Justice
- Citations: (1992) C-127/92, [1993] IRLR 591

Keywords
- Discrimination, equal pay, justification

Enderby v Frenchay Health Authority (1992) C-127/92 is an EU labour law, relevant for UK labour law, that concerns the justification test for unequal pay between men and women.

== Facts ==
Dr Pamela Mary Enderby was a speech therapist. She received around 40% less pay than senior hospital pharmacists and clinical psychologists. She said she should have equal pay. Tribunal held the difference came from different bargaining structures of the three professions, which were not in themselves discriminatory.

The Employment Appeal Tribunal dismissed her appeal. The Court of Appeal made a reference to the ECJ asking whether the separate bargaining structures could be an objective justification under (what is now) TFEU art 157. Also it asked whether it was the case that, ‘if the employer could establish that serious shortages in one of the comparator professions explained part, but not all, of the difference in pay, the whole or only part of that difference should be regarded as justified.’

== Judgment ==
The ECJ in 1997 held that although the worker has the burden of proof, this cannot undermine enforcement of equal pay. Therefore when statistics show an appreciable difference between jobs of equal value, the burden passes to the employer to objectively justify the disparity.

16 However, if the pay of speech therapists is significantly lower than that of pharmacists and if the former are almost exclusively women while the latter are predominantly men, there is a prima facie case of sex discrimination, at least where the two jobs in question are of equal value and the statistics describing that situation are valid...

22 The fact that the rates of pay at issue are decided by collective bargaining processes conducted separately for each of the two professional groups concerned, without any discriminatory effect within each group, does not preclude a finding of prima facie discrimination where the results of those processes show that two groups with the same employer and the same trade union are treated differently. If the employer could rely on the absence of discrimination within each of the collective bargaining processes taken separately as sufficient justification for the difference in pay, he could, as the German Government pointed out, easily circumvent the principle of equal pay by using separate bargaining processes...

27 If, as the question referred seems to suggest, the national court has been able to determine precisely what proportion of the increase in pay is attributable to market forces, it must necessarily accept that the pay differential is objectively justified to the extent of that proportion. When national authorities have to apply Community law, they must apply the principle of proportionality.

== See also ==
- UK labour law
- UK employment equality law
- Agenda for Change
