= London weighting =

UK concept of greater salaries for London-based staff

London weighting is an allowance paid to certain civil servants, teachers, airline employees, PhD students, police and security officers in and around London, the capital of England. It is designed to help these workers with the cost of living in Greater London, which is higher than that of the rest of the UK. Its purpose is to encourage key workers to stay in Greater London.

London weighting was introduced for civil servants in 1920 and was set by the London Pay Board. However, since 1974, the Greater London Council, and later the Mayor of London, in partnership with central government, have been responsible for setting it. In 2002, teachers from across South East England went on strike to try to force London weighting to be raised. In many professions, such as teaching, a different level of weighting is applied to Inner London and Outer London. In addition, many employers use different pay grades for Greater London as opposed to a fixed allowance, and some groups – the police, for example – have both a London weighting and a London allowance.

Since the abolition of the Pay Board in 1974, no organisation has been responsible for setting London weighting. The GLA carried out an investigation into the issue but did not propose a new figure. Currently, the amounts paid by employers as London weighting, or London allowance, or in some cases both, vary greatly. Further information is available from pay analysts such as the Labour Research Department.

== See also ==
- Agenda for Change
