= Teddington Memorial Hospital =

- Kingston and Richmond NHS Foundation Trust
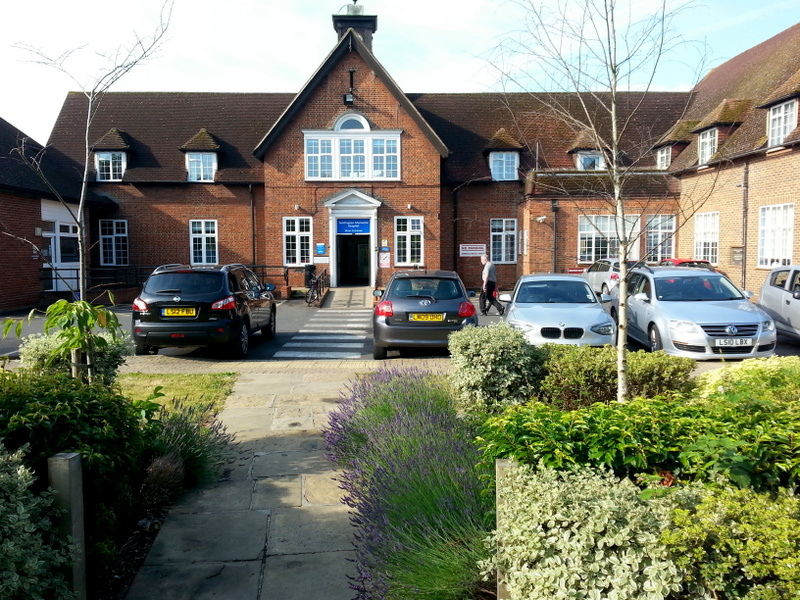
- Teddington Memorial Hospital

- Location within Richmond upon Thames

Geography
- Location: Hampton Road, Teddington, London, England, United Kingdom
- Coordinates: 51°25′32.9″N 0°20′27.4″W

Organisation
- Care system: National Health Service
- Type: Community

Services
- Emergency department: No

History
- Founded: 1875

Links
- Website: www.hrch.nhs.uk/locations-and-clinics/teddington-memorial-hospital

Teddington Memorial Hospital is a community hospital in Teddington in the London Borough of Richmond upon Thames. It is operated by Kingston and Richmond NHS Foundation Trust. Its facilities include an NHS urgent treatment centre, a diagnostics department (including x-ray), two wards with beds for inpatient rehabilitation and several outpatient clinics including physiotherapy.

== History ==
The hospital was opened as the Teddington and Hampton Wick Cottage Hospital in 1875. Thomas Chappell, of the music publishing and piano manufacturing firm, provided a site at Elfin Grove where the existing residential buildings were adapted for their new use.

It was replaced in 1929 by a new Teddington, Hampton Wick and District Memorial Hospital, intended as a memorial to those killed in the First World War. Its foundation stone had been laid the previous year by Lord Dawson of Penn, physician to the British royal family. By 1931 the hospital's name had been shortened to Teddington Memorial Hospital.

Teddington Memorial Hospital and Community NHS Trust was established in 1993 and dissolved in 2001. The hospital is now operated by Hounslow and Richmond Community Healthcare NHS Trust.

== Transport ==
The hospital is served by London Buses routes 285 and R68. The nearest railway station is Teddington on the Kingston loop line, with services provided by South Western Railway.
