= Sue John =

British headteacher and educator (born 1953)

Dame Susan Elizabeth John

Headmistress of Lampton School
- In office 1997–2015

Personal details
- Born: 1 April 1953 (age 73)
- Profession: Educator
- Awards: DBE

Dame Susan Elizabeth John DBE (born 1953), is a British headteacher and educator, who chairs the Teacher Development Trust.

Awarded a damehood in 2011 for leading a low-performing and unpopular London school to being oversubscribed and graded as outstanding by OFSTED, from 1997 until 2015 she served as headmistress of Lampton School which was included in the 2010 OFSTED publication Twelve Outstanding Secondary Schools: excelling against the odds.

== Career ==
Revolutionising the fortunes of a large multi-ethnic mixed school, as Headmistress of Lampton School in the London Borough of Hounslow between 1997 and 2015, John was appointed DBE in the 2011 New Year Honours for "services to local and national education".

Subsequently appointed a director of the Brilliant Club, DfE, Future and Teaching Leaders then chair of the South London Teaching School Hub and Charles Dickens Research School, Dame Sue is a member of the Sutton Trust Education Advisory Group, the advisory group for the Fair Education Alliance and the Royal Society’s curriculum group. She has also served as a trustee for the Haberdashers' Academies Trust South and chair of Trustees for the Teacher Development Trust.

== Honours and awards ==
=== Honours ===
- Dame Commander of the Order of the British Empire (2011)
  - Freeman of the Worshipful Company of Haberdashers
  - Freeman of the City of London

=== Awards ===
- Hon. DUniv – Roehampton University (2017)
- Hon. Fellow – Brunel University (2000)
