= Lampton School =

Lampton School Academy

Location
- Lampton Avenue; Hounslow, TW3 4EP; England; 51°28′38″N 0°22′05″W

Information
- Type: Academy
- Established: 1959
- Department for Education URN: 136341 Tables
- Ofsted: Reports
- Head Teacher: Stephen Davis
- Age: 11 to 19
- Enrolment: 1389
- Former name: Spring Grove Grammar School
- Website: www.lampton.hounslow.sch.uk

Lampton School Academy is a secondary school and sixth form with academy status located in Hounslow, west London, England.

== Admissions ==
Lampton is a Leading Edge school, and is a training school which currently has around 1,358 students on roll. Lampton borders the A4 (Great West Road) in Hounslow, and is next to Lampton Park. This is about one mile west of Spring Grove, and a mile south of the M4 near Heston. Osterley Park is a mile to the north-east. Its ethnic mix reflects that of the local area, with most students being of South Asian heritage. The school has a wide range of ethnicities, including white British, Polish, and many more from across the world. Around 30% of students receive free school meals.

Lampton also offers a 6th Form for pupils aged 16 and over, which takes the majority of its intake from Lampton GCSE students, but is also open to applicants from outside the school. The headteacher is Stephen Davis. He succeeded Dame Susan John, who was appointed a DBE in 2011.

== History ==
Lampton School used to be known as Spring Grove Grammar School, a grammar school, before being converted to a comprehensive. It changed its name to Lampton in 1969.

The school gained its Humanities Specialist status in 2003, a designation which enabled the building of the Language and Learning Zone (LLZ), a multi-media and Information and communication technologies suite situated at the western end of the Spring Grove building.

== Academic performance ==
The last OFSTED inspection, in 2013, found the school to be "outstanding". In 2009 Ofsted highlighted Lampton as one of 67 good schools serving disadvantaged communities.

== Prime Minister's Global Fellowship ==
The school has had students attaining places on the Prime Minister's Global Fellowship programme. The school achieved its first student in the inaugural year of the programme, 2008, and in 2009 had two more successful applicants.

== Murder of Lynne Weedon ==
In 1975, a 16-year-old schoolgirl, Lynne Weedon, was murdered outside the school.

== Notable former pupils ==
=== Lampton School ===
- Hammasa Kohistani, model, Miss England 2005
- Owais Shah, cricketer

=== Spring Grove Grammar School ===
- Sylvia Cheeseman, 100m sprinter, won bronze in the 4x100m relay at the 1952 Olympics in Helsinki
- Ian McLagan, musician, including with the rock bands Small Faces and Faces.
- Malcolm Pearcey , British Junior C1 canoe slalom champion 71/2/3 and senior champion 1974
