= Agenda for Change =

English National Health Service grading and pay system

Agenda for Change (AfC) is the current National Health Service (NHS) grading and pay system for NHS staff, with the exception of doctors, dentists, apprentices and some senior managers. It covers more than 1 million people and harmonises their pay scales and career progression arrangements across traditionally separate pay groups, in the most radical change since the NHS was founded.

Agenda for Change came into operation on 1 December 2004, following agreement between the unions, employers and governments involved.

== Job evaluation ==
The AfC system allocates posts to set pay bands by giving consideration to aspects of the job, such as the skills involved, under an NHS Job Evaluation Scheme. There are nine numbered pay bands subdivided into points, similar to the old alphabetic Whitley Council 'grades' pay scales. A set of national job profiles has been agreed to assist in the process of matching posts to pay bands. All staff will either be matched to a national job profile, or their job will be evaluated locally. In theory, AfC is designed to evaluate the job rather than the person in it, and to ensure equity between similar posts in different areas. In reality it has been implemented differently in different places, and some posts have been graded very differently from similar jobs elsewhere, despite the supposedly tighter definitions. Around 5% of staff appealed their initial banding, but again the appeals process varies from site to site. Current indications suggest that lower bandings are being used in London and Scotland than elsewhere in the country.

Under AfC, all staff have annual development reviews against the NHS Knowledge and Skills Framework (KSF). Normal pay progression is one point a year, but pay progression at specified 'gateway' points in each pay band depend on how the individual matches the KSF outline for their post. Progression onto a different band has become very difficult, as the post would need to have changed substantially in order to be re-graded (even if the person in the post has developed and become more experienced or taken on more responsibilities this would not be seen as a good enough reason to re-band a post). The full implementation of KSF has been slow.

Staff have a contributory pension with tiered employee contribution rates starting at a 5% rate increasing in 7 steps to 14.5% on income above £111,337.

== History ==
When the NHS was established in 1948, it adopted the Whitley industrial relations system, which was used in the civil service and local government. The system stemmed from work done by J. H. Whitley in 1916 and provided a framework for pay, terms and conditions.

The NHS Whitley system had essentially been unaltered since its inception, although there had been some changes. Nevertheless, it had been heavily criticised for decades. These criticisms centred on its structure, complexity and over-centralisation, and its lack of flexibility. There was also concern that the existing pay scales were not easily adaptable to developing equal pay for work of equal value.

In 1997 an eleven-year-long landmark legal case for equal pay in the NHS, Enderby v Frenchay Health Authority, decided that the pay of speech therapists, mostly women, was of equal value to higher paid clinical psychologists, mostly men. The differences in pay were because the two groups bargained separately under the Whitley system. This highlighted an important inadequacy of the NHS Whitley system.

Negotiations on a new system began in February 1999, when the White Paper Agenda for Change was published. It aimed to address the issues of the Whitley system, and highlighted the need for a change of pay, career structures and terms and conditions of employment within the NHS. It stated that any new pay system must deliver equal pay for work of equal value.

A number of organisations were involved in the discussions and negotiations including:

- The four health departments of England, Northern Ireland, Scotland and Wales
- NHS Employers – which represents NHS employers
- Twenty trade unions and representative bodies.

Negotiations on the new pay system were concluded in November 2002, allowing full-scale testing of the new Agenda for Change pay system to begin at twelve "early implementer" sites in England in June 2003, with pilot sites in Scotland following.

On 1 December 2004 it was implemented across the UK, with pay and conditions backdated to 1 October 2004. Although most NHS employees in England and Wales were quick to transfer to the new system with staff receiving their back-pay, Scotland had been slower to implement the system because Scotland took a more robust approach to the implementation. All the signatory organisations agreed to implement it through a partnership approach.

In 2013 some amendments to Agenda for Change were agreed:

- incremental pay rises for staff will now be conditional on individuals meeting locally set performance requirements
- for the top three bands, 8c, 8d and 9, increments will have to be earned annually, and might not be retained where the appropriate local level of performance is not reached
- for the top three bands employers may introduce alternative local pay arrangements
- better protection for staff moved to lower grade posts.

From September 2014 NHS Wales intends to pay NHS staff at least the living wage, resulting in about 2,400 employees receiving an increase in salary of up to £470 above UK wide Agenda for Change rates.

After the 2008 financial crisis, NHS pay was frozen in 2011 for two years, followed by increases capped at 1%. In March 2017 the National Health Service Pay Review Body (NHSPRB), the independent body who advises the government on healthcare sector pay, advised that the public sector 1% pay cap be extended for another year.

In June 2018 employers and unions announced that NHS staff in England had accepted a deal to reform the current Agenda for Change system and provide a three-year pay deal. The reforms include the removal of overlapping pay points between bands and incremental pay progression no longer occurring on a yearly basis. The final year of implementation is 2020/21. The objectives included:

- increasing starting salaries
- reducing the number of pay points thus shortening the time to reach the top of the pay scale.

In 2020 the government agreed, due to the COVID-19 crisis, that NHS staff will not be fully subject to the public sector pay freeze when the three-year pay deal end in April 2021.

== Bands ==
Example job profiles within the nine bands are:

1. Catering Assistant, Cleaner
2. Administrative Assistant, Health Care Support Worker, Portering
3. Secretary, Health Care Support Worker (Emergency Medicine/ Theatres), Occupational Therapy Assistant/ Technician/ Support Worker, Physiotherapy Assistant, Speech Therapy Assistant, Social Care Assistant
4. Office Supervisor/ Team Leader, Medical Secretary, Personal Assistant, Finance Officer, Assistant Nurse Practitioner, Occupational Therapy Assistant/ Technician/ Support Worker, Nursery Nurse, Pharmacy Technician, Social Work Assistant/ Social Case Officer,
5. Office Manager/ Junior Manager, Staff Nurse, Midwife (Newly Qualified), Paramedic (Newly Qualified), Diagnostic/Therapeutic Radiographer, Dietitian, Emergency Medical Technician, Senior Pharmacy Technician, Occupational Therapist, Physiotherapist, Clinical Physiologist, Operating Department Practitioner (Newly Qualified), Speech & Language Therapist (Newly Qualified), Biomedical Scientist (Entry Level), Social Worker (Newly Qualified), Assistant Psychologist
6. Management Accountant, Junior Sister, Specialist Staff Nurse, Specialist Dietitian, Paramedic, Senior Radiographer (Diagnostic/Therapeutic) Emergency Nurse Practitioner, Health Visitor, Specialist Speech and language therapist Senior Physiotherapist, Senior Occupational Therapist, Biomedical Scientists, Chaplains, Trainee Clinical Scientist (STP), Social Worker, Psychologist/ Trained Nurse/Social Work Therapist, Trainee Approved Mental Health Professional
7. Department Manager, Senior Sister, Advanced Nurse Practitioner, Clinical Lead Dietitian, Senior Radiographer (Diagnostic/Therapeutic Team Leader), Sonographer, Chief Dental Technician, Specialist Clinical/Counselling/Forensic Psychologist, Senior Paramedic, Chief Clinical Physiologist, Highly specialist Speech and language therapist, Senior Physiotherapist, Senior Occupational Therapist, Physician Associate, Biomedical Scientist (Senior Level), Clinical Scientist (after completion of STP), Approved Mental Health Professional, Senior Social Worker
8. (sub divided into 4 bands - a, b, c, d) Deputy Associate Director/ Associate Director, Senior Nurse Manager/ Matron, Advanced Pharmacist, Dietitian Manager, Superintendent Radiographer (Diagnostic/Therapeutic), Senior Chief Highly Specialist Clinical/Counselling/Forensic Physiologist, Senior Physician Associate, Chief Biomedical Scientist, Consultant Paramedic, Consultant Social Worker/ Team Manager, Approved Mental Health Professional Manager
9. Chief Pharmacist, Very Senior Clinicians managing large/multiple services, Head/Director of Psychology, Head of Adult Services (Social Work), Deputy Board Directors and Very Senior Managers just below Corporate/ Board level responsibility, Directors of services which are not a Board level positions (e.g. Estates, Digital Services, Mental Health Services etc.)

== Knowledge and Skills Framework ==
The Knowledge and Skills Framework (KSF) is a competence framework to support personal development and career progression within the NHS in the United Kingdom. It applies to all staff except board members, doctors and dentists, as they did not come under Agenda for Change.

The Agenda for Change national agreement includes a commitment to introduce a system of annual development reviews and to create lifelong learning development opportunities. Staff have their own Personal Development Plan, developed jointly in discussion with their manager or reviewer.

Employers and staff have called for a simplified KSF that is easier to use. In response, the NHS Staff Council has developed a simplified KSF that gives employers more flexibility and can be tailored to meet local needs.

== London weighting ==
Agenda for Change, like its predecessors since at least 1974, includes additional payments, called the high cost area supplement, intended to relate to the additional costs, particularly housing, of living in London. There are three separate bands: Inner London, Outer London and London Fringe. The Inner London rate in 2017 was 20% of salary, with a minimum payment of £4,200 and a maximum payment of £6,469). Outer London rate was 15% of salary and London Fringe 5%.

In 2018 the Chief Executive of Kingston Hospital NHS Foundation Trust called for a flat rate “weighting system” across Greater London in September 2018, saying that living in Richmond was no cheaper than living in Islington and that cost of living was a leading contributor to their staff turnover.
