= Hounslow =

Town in West London, England

Coordinates: 51°28′00″N 0°22′30″W

- Town
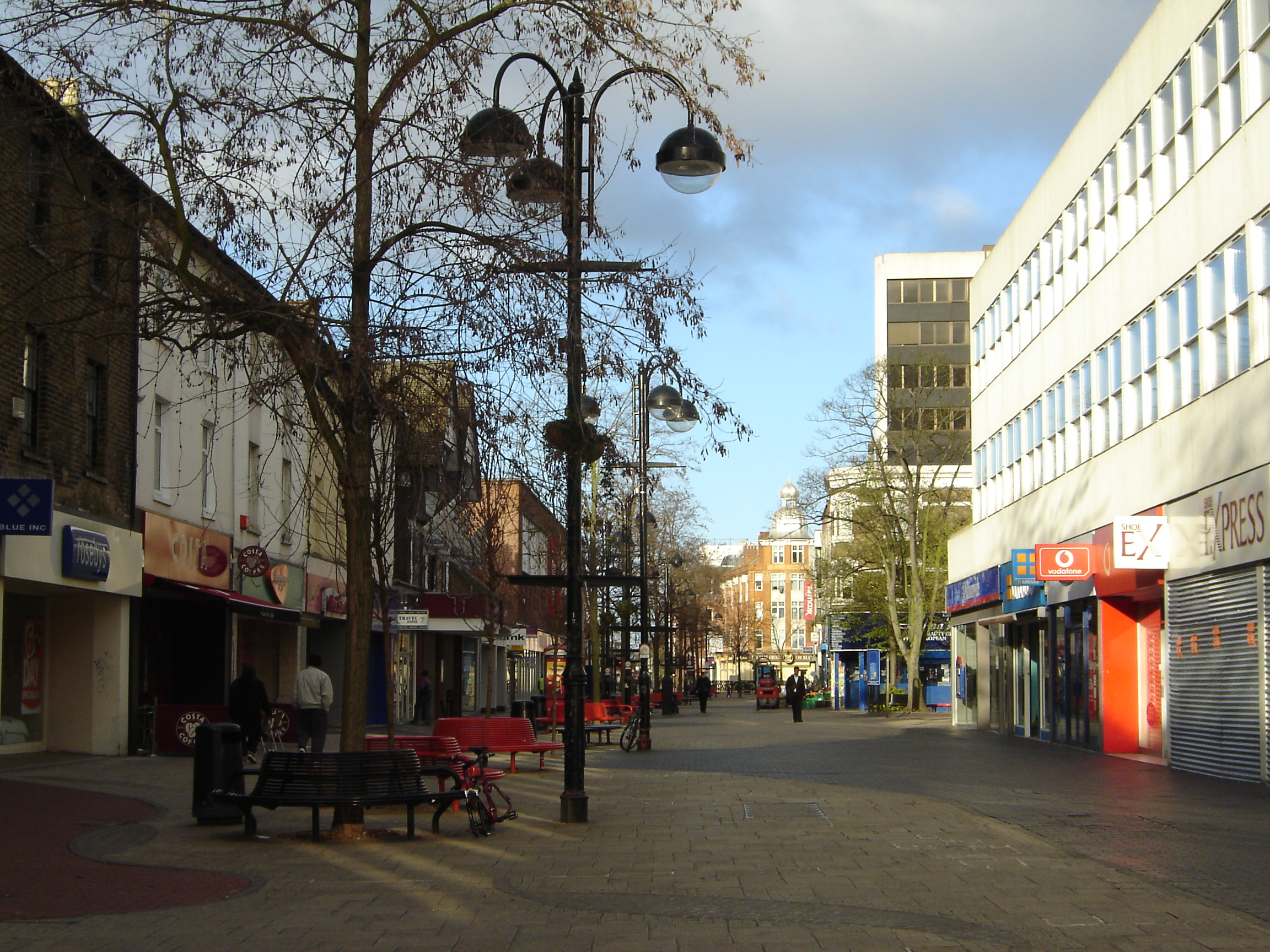
- High Street

- Location within Greater London
- Population: 103,337 (2011 Census)
- OS grid reference: TQ140760
  - Charing Cross: 10.7 mi (17.2 km) ENE
- London borough: Hounslow
- Ceremonial county: Greater London
- Region: London
- Country: England
- Sovereign state: United Kingdom
- Post town: HOUNSLOW
- Postcode district: TW3–TW6
- Dialling code: 020
- Police: Metropolitan
- Fire: London
- Ambulance: London
- UK Parliament: Brentford and Isleworth, Feltham and Heston; Hayes and Harlington; Twickenham
- London Assembly: South West

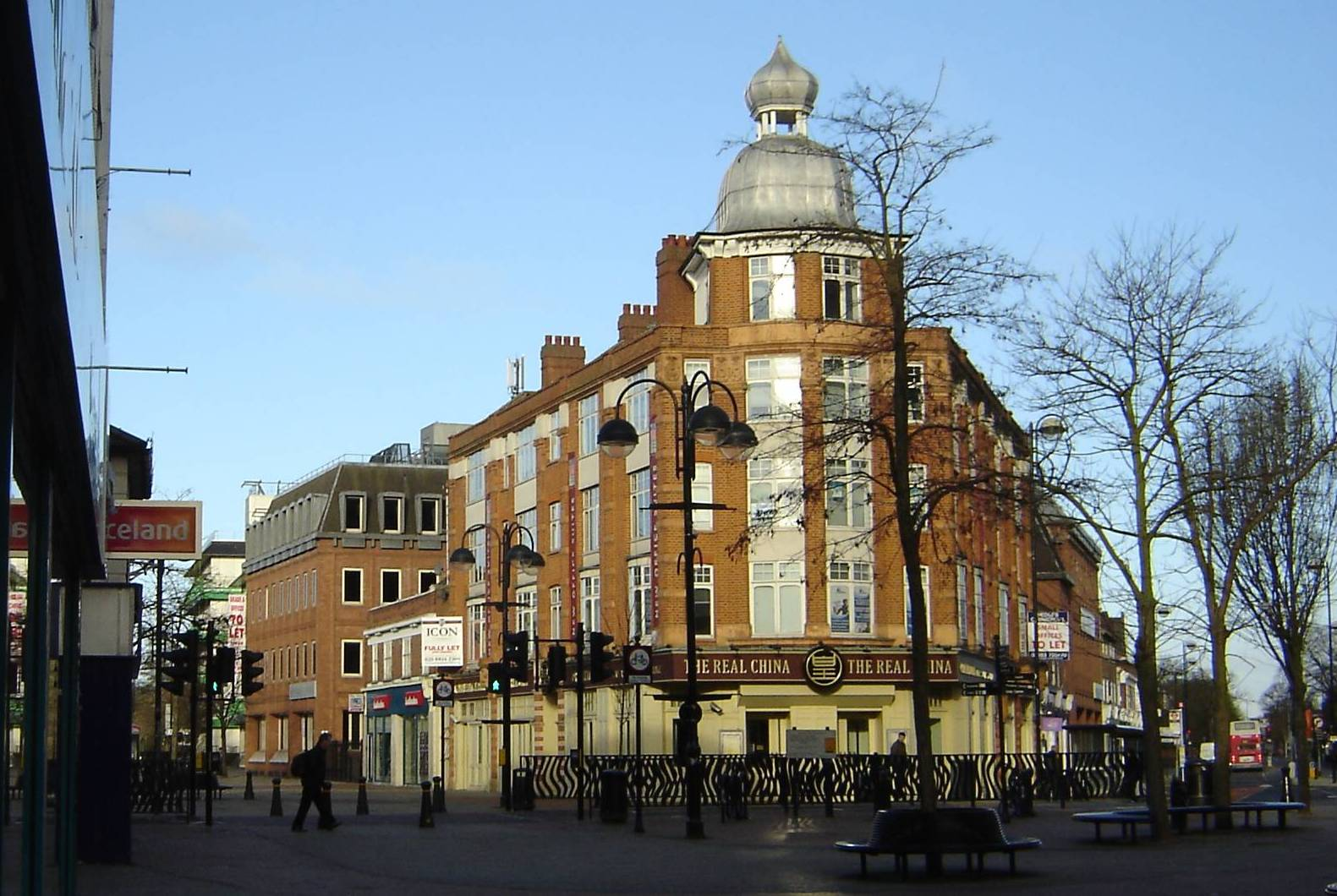
Junction of Bell Road and High Street

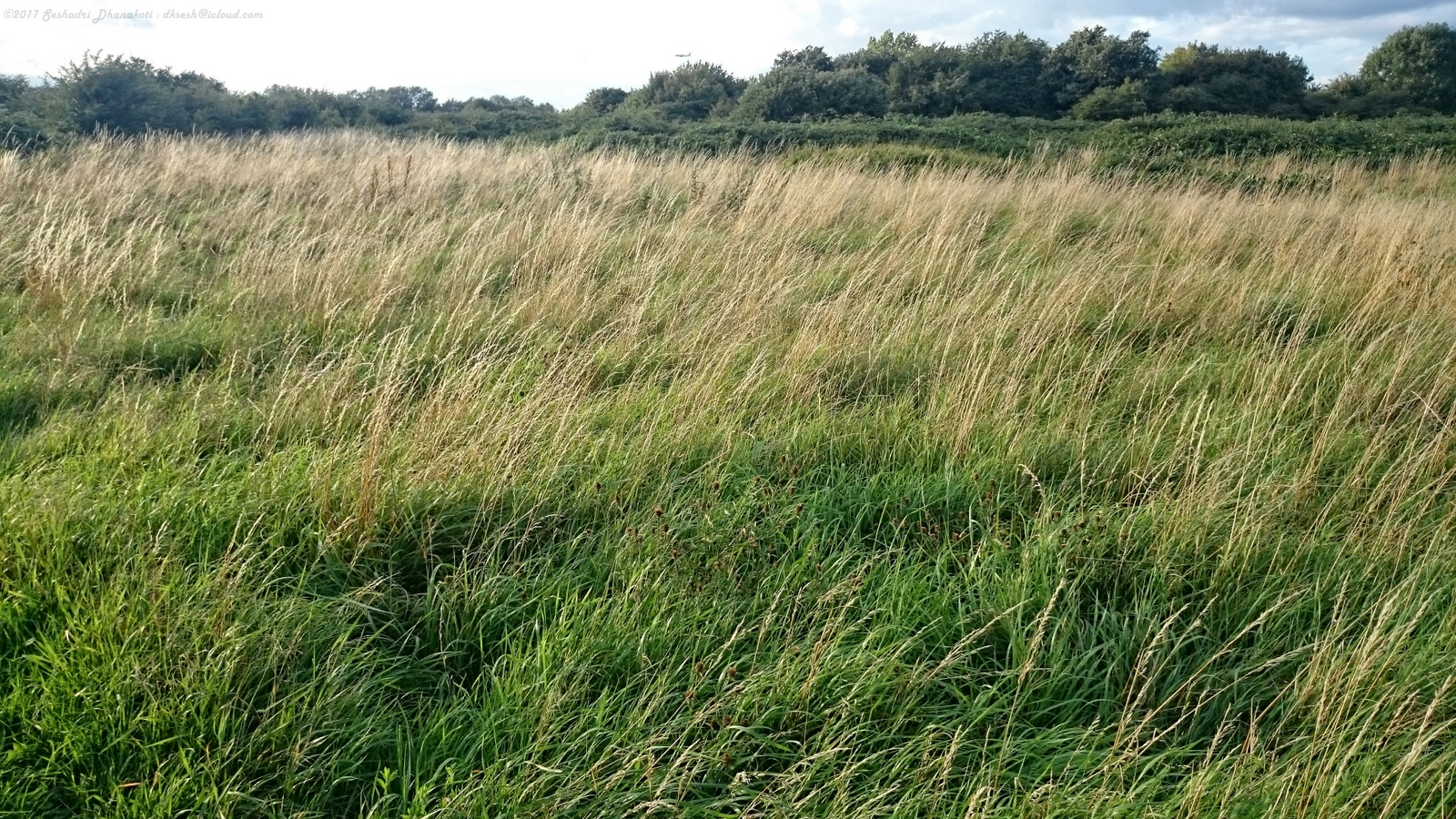
Hounslow Heath Nature Reserve

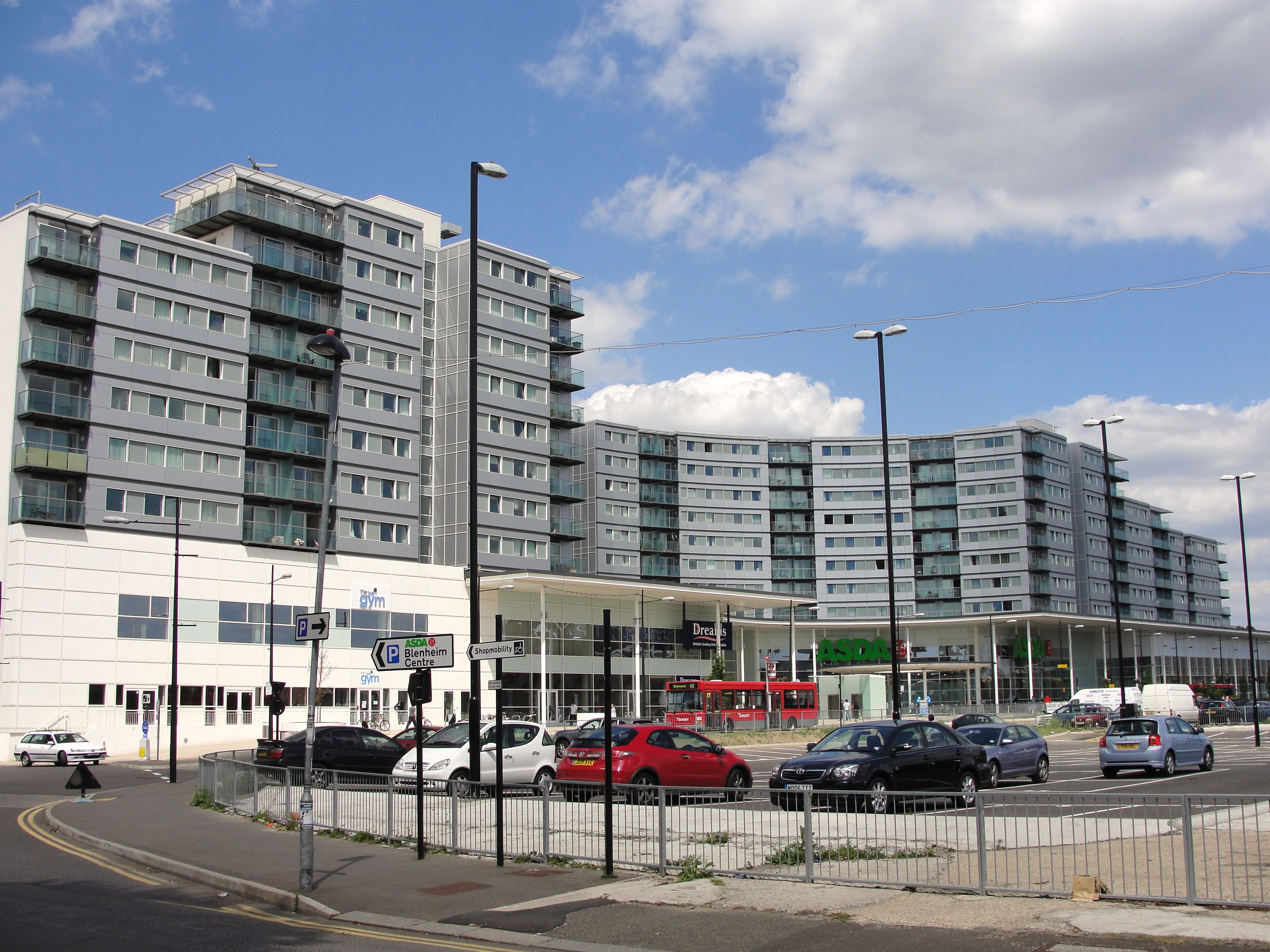
ASDA store with apartments at the Blenheim Centre

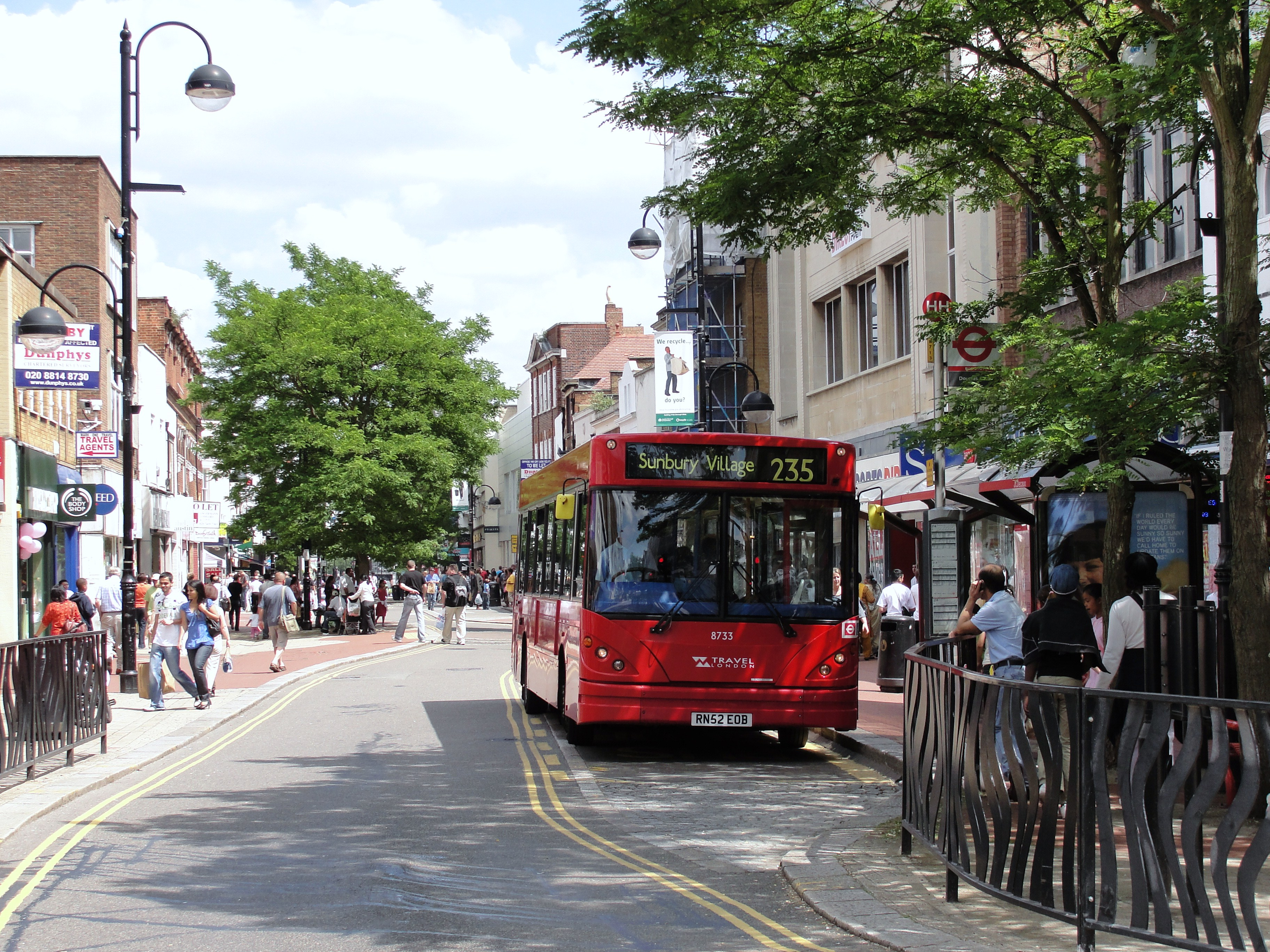
High Street

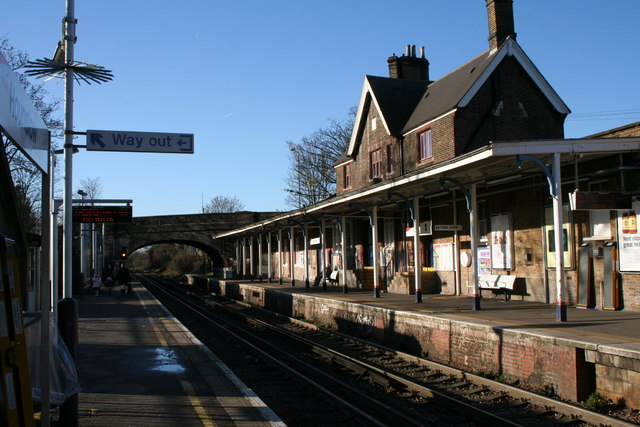
Hounslow railway station

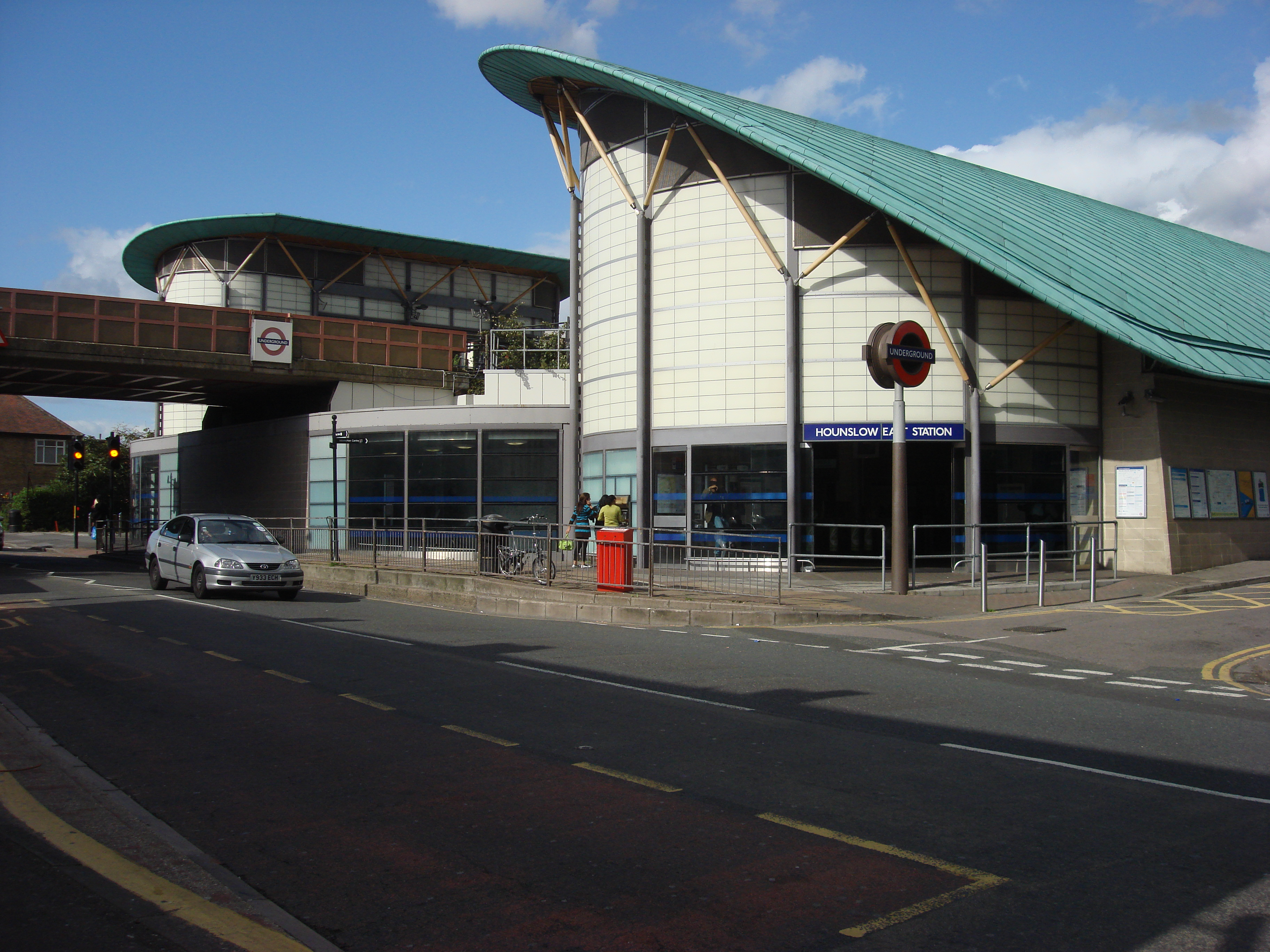
Hounslow East tube station

Hounslow (/ˈhaʊnzloʊ/ HOWNZ-loh) is a large town in West London, England, 10 3/4 miles (17.5 kilometres) west-southwest of Charing Cross. It is the administrative centre of the London Borough of Hounslow, and is identified in the London Plan as one of the 14 metropolitan centres in Greater London.

It is bounded by Isleworth to the east, Twickenham to its south, Feltham to its west and Southall to its north.

The Hounslow post town covers the TW3, TW4, TW5 and TW6 postcodes. Most of the post town is in the London Borough of Hounslow, but parts fall within the London Borough of Richmond upon Thames and the London Borough of Hillingdon, notably including Heathrow Airport.

== History ==
=== Etymology ===
In old records, Hounslow is spelt 'Hundeslow' which points to the Anglo-Saxon phrase 'Hundes hlāw', translating to 'the Hound's barrow' or more accurately 'the barrow of a man named or nicknamed Hound'.

=== Hounslow Town ===
Hounslow was centred around the Holy Trinity Priory founded in 1211. The priory developed what had been a small village into a town with regular markets and other facilities for travellers heading to and from London. Although the priory was dissolved in 1539, the town remained an important staging post on the Bath Road.

By 1650 the town comprised 120 houses, of which a significant proportion operated as inns or alehouses to accommodate travellers. The expansion of scheduled coach services during the eighteenth century further stimulated the local economy as the town served as the final stop before, or the first stop after, London.

The construction of the Great Western Railway line from London to Bristol from 1838 reduced long-distance travel along the Bath Road. Because the local economy was heavily reliant on transit the introduction of the railways during the 1830s and 1840s triggered an economic depression. By 1842, the local paper was reporting that the 'formerly flourishing village' (which used to stable 2000 horses) was suffering a 'general depreciation of property'. In 1847 the final stagecoach passed through Hounslow, marking the end of long-distance, horse-drawn coach services in the area due to increasing competition from the growing railway network.

The decline of the Hounslow's economy was mitigated by the arrival of a suburban rail line in 1850. The Hounslow Loop Line was constructed in 1850 – which prompted new development and stimulated the development of South Hounslow into an affluent residential district. Hounslow Hospital opened in 1876 and closed in 1978. Hanworth Road drill hall (now the Treaty Lodge Hotel) was built for the 2nd Volunteer Battalion, The Middlesex Regiment.

The construction of the Great West Road (a by-pass for the Bath Road, around Brentford, Isleworth and Hounslow town centres) in the 1920s attracted the building of factories and headquarters of large companies and led to a great deal of housing development. After a decline in the 1970s, offices largely replaced factories and further expansion in hotel and housing stock started to take place.

=== Hounslow Heath ===
Hounslow Heath has a continuous recorded history dating back to the Norman period, in which it lent its name to the hamlet of Heathrow. It was infamously known for the numbers of highwaymen and footpads in the area, who targeted wealthy individuals and noblemen. Following their executions at Tyburn, the bodies of highwaymen were in 1802 still displayed on Hounslow Heath. They were hung from gibbets situated between Bath Road and Staines Road on the western outskirts of the town. Around 1809 the gibbets were taken down.

The Heath once had strategic importance as its routes acted as a throughway from London to the west and southwest of Britain. The present northern boundary of the Heath - Staines Road - was the Roman Road later known as the Devils Highway. There are several historic references to Roman camps surrounding the Heath. Both Oliver Cromwell and James II used the heath as a military encampment.

In 1784 the first accurate measurements were made on the heath to establish the base line for the Ordnance Survey trigonometrical survey of Great Britain. The event was attended by King George IV and Joseph Banks, president of the Royal Society.

In 1793, the Cavalry Barracks were constructed and were extended with the Beavers Lane Camp. Between 1914 and 1920 the heath became Hounslow Heath Aerodrome.

Hounslow Heath Aerodrome was a grass airfield and was operational from 1910 to 1920. It was in the London borough of Hounslow, and in 1919 was where the first scheduled daily international commercial air services began.

== Emergency services ==
The territorial police force is the Metropolitan Police. Hounslow Police Station is located on Montague Road, adjacent to the High Street.

The statutory fire and rescue service in Hounslow is the London Fire Brigade (LFB), with the nearest fire station in Isleworth on London Road.

The nearest accident and emergency hospital is West Middlesex University Hospital, in Isleworth, which is part of the Chelsea and Westminster Hospital NHS Foundation Trust and a teaching hospital of the Imperial College School of Medicine. London Ambulance Service provides emergency ambulance services.

== Governance ==
Hounslow forms part of the London Borough of Hounslow, governed by Hounslow Council based at Hounslow House at 7 Bath Road. As part of Greater London it is also covered by the London Assembly and Mayor of London for certain strategic functions.

The original settlement of Hounslow grew up on the boundary between the ancient parishes of Heston and Isleworth, both in the Isleworth Hundred of Middlesex. Hounslow was made its own ecclesiastical parish in 1835, whilst continuing to straddle Heston and Isleworth for civil purposes.

In 1875 a local government district was created covering the whole of the two civil parishes, governed by an elected local board. The district was initially divided into three electoral wards: Heston, Hounslow and Isleworth. Such local government districts were converted into urban districts under the Local Government Act 1894.

A referendum of local electors was held in 1927 on whether to change the urban district's name from Heston and Isleworth to Hounslow. A significant majority of those who voted supported the change of name (6,778 in favour, 3,775 against), but it was vetoed by Middlesex County Council. The urban district was incorporated to become the Municipal Borough of Heston and Isleworth in 1932.

The borough of Heston and Isleworth was abolished in 1965. Its area was transferred from Middlesex to Greater London and merged with the abolished Municipal Borough of Brentford and Chiswick and Feltham Urban District to become the London Borough of Hounslow.

Hounslow is part of multiple constituencies for elections to the House of Commons.; Brentford and Isleworth, Feltham and Heston, Hayes and Harlington and Twickenham.

Hounslow is covered by multiple wards for elections to Hounslow London Borough Council; Hounslow Central, Hounslow East, Hounslow Heath, Hounslow South and Hounslow West.

== Geography ==
Hounslow is separated from Twickenham by Hanworth Road (A314) Nelson Road, Hounslow Road (B361) and Whitton Dene/ Murray Park.

Hall Road, Bridge Road, the Hounslow Loop Line, Thornbury Park, Worton Way, the Piccadilly Line, Stucley Road and Osterley Park separate Hounslow and Isleworth.

The Norwood Green estate and Industrial area in North Hyde, separate Hounslow and Southall whilst the River Crane and Cranford Park form a natural boundary between Hounslow and Hayes

Historically, Hounslow's traditional western boundary followed the River Crane; however, it now extends to the Bath Road (A4), Duke of Northumberlands River and Great South-West Road (A30) and back to the river (to include Heathrow Airport).

== Demography ==
The suburban district of Hounslow, including its localities Cranford, Heston, Hounslow West and Lampton, was 103,337 in the 2011 census, whereas the wider borough had a population of 254,000.

2011 Census: homes
Ward	Detached	Semi-detached	Terraced	Flats and apartments	Caravans/temporary/mobile homes	Shared between households
Hounslow Central	257	1,455	930	2,687	3	52
Hounslow Heath	285	1,522	1,128	1,886	7	87
Hounslow South	223	2,155	967	588	0	11
Hounslow West	248	1,526	799	1,344	5	23

2011 Census: households
Ward	Population	Households	% Owned outright	% Owned with a loan	hectares
Hounslow Central	15,169	5,384	19	19	174
Hounslow Heath	14,727	4,915	17	27	279
Hounslow South	11,408	3,944	33	42	179
Hounslow West	12,658	3,945	23	24	162

Hounslow has a high proportion of people who identify themselves as BAME (Black, Asian and minority ethnic), and is the borough's most diverse town. In seven of Hounslow's eight electoral wards, the BAME proportion is above 70%. The town has a large British Asian and Somali community.

== Economy ==
Hounslow is an economic hub within the west of the capital city, with it having a large shopping centre which adjoins its high street and many restaurants, cafés and small businesses, many of which are associated with product assembly, marketing, telecommunications and Heathrow Airport, which has many businesses and public sector jobs in and around it to which the local population commute. The settlement is also partially employed in the Commuter Belt with access between 45 and 60 minutes from most of Central London.

DHL Air UK has its head office in the Orbital Park in Hounslow.

Hounslow Town Centre is a busy predominantly retail centre, with a small number of commercial offices and civic buildings. There is a large shopping centre called the Treaty Centre which opened in 1987, containing JD, Next, H&M and many large branches of chain stores found in British high streets. It includes a food court along with over 50 shops. There is a large ASDA superstore located within the Blenheim Centre complex (which was completed in 2006) along with B&M, a local health centre, a gym run by The Gym Group and Jungle V.I.P. (a children's indoor play area).

A new retail area, the High Street Quarter, will be located near Hounslow High Street and is set to contain a 27-storey residential tower along with many shops, restaurants, and a ten-screen Cineworld cinema multiplex.

Gillette, the American razor manufacturer, built its UK factory and HQ here in 1936–1937. The art-deco style building was designed by architect Banister Flight Fletcher and is Grade II listed. The 45 m (148 ft) high clocktower with its illuminated clock became a landmark for traffic on the nearby Great West Road. The clock has recently been restored to working order and the main building will be converted into a state-of-the-art digital production studio.

== Culture and community ==
Hounslow Heath is a large public open space and local nature reserve to the west of Hounslow, a London borough. It now covers about 200 acres (80 ha) and is only the residue of the historic Hounslow Heath that once covered over 4,000 acres (1,600 ha).

Bell Square is an outdoor performance space next to the Bell pub. Hounslow Community Land Project was a community garden and sports area on a derelict piece of land on Hanworth Road.

=== Twinning ===
Hounslow is twinned with the following settlements around the world:

- Issy-les-Moulineaux, France
- Lahore, Pakistan
- Ramallah, Palestine
- Jalandhar, India

The London Borough of Hounslow also has a sister district agreement with Leningradsky District in Krasnodar Krai, Russia.

== Landmarks ==
One of the earliest surviving houses in the town is The Lawn, in front of the former Civic Centre with its public tennis courts, in brown brick with three double-hung sash windows set back in reveals with flat arches, roof with parapet and porch of fluted doric columns, pilasters, entablature and semi-circular traceried fanlight. The similar example of 44–50 Bath Road: also in brown brick and as is sometimes seen, has been painted.

Nearby country houses include Osterley House, Syon House, Hanworth Park House and Worton Hall.

== Transport ==
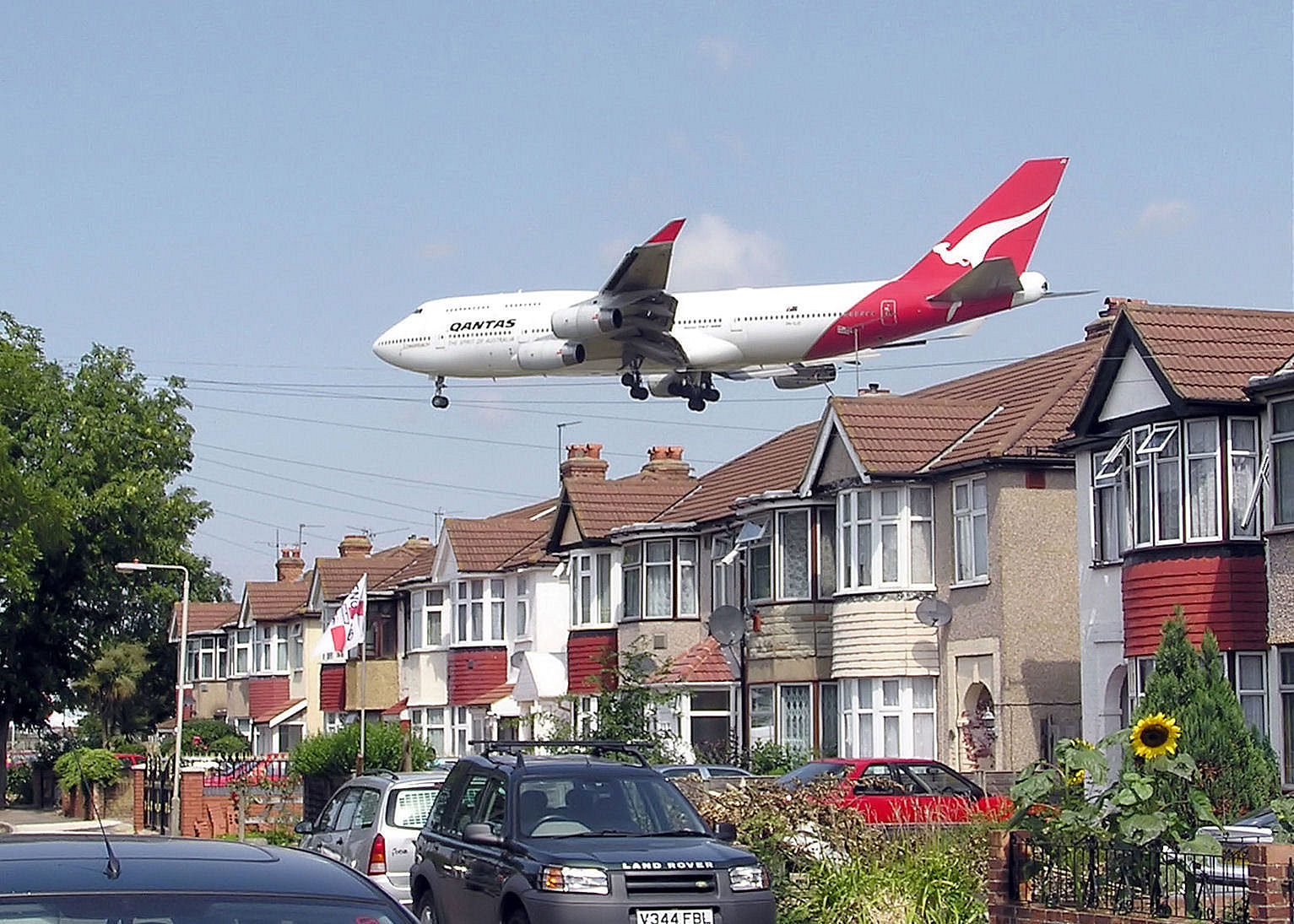
A Qantas Boeing 747-400 over Myrtle Avenue, Hounslow on approach to Heathrow Airport runway 27L

=== Major roads ===
There are three major roads in Hounslow. The east–west roads, the A4 'Great West Road' and the 'Bath Road' that connects Hounslow to Central London and Slough, and the A30 'Great South West Road' that connects it to Staines-upon-Thames, which meet at Henlys Roundabout in Hounslow West. There is also the north–south road, the A312 'The Causeway' and 'The Parkway', which connects Hounslow to Hampton in the south and Harrow to the north.

Additionally, A and B roads in Hounslow include the A314 'Hanworth Road' that starts in Hounslow and finishes in Hanworth, Feltham. The historic A315 'London Road', 'Hounslow High Street', 'Hanworth Road', 'Grove Road' and 'Staines Road'; which starts in Central London and ends in Bedfont, Feltham. In doing this, it connects Hounslow to towns and districts such as Kensington, Hammersmith, Chiswick, Brentford and Isleworth.

=== East-west roads ===
The A4 Great West Road joins with the A3006 Bath Road (from the A315) before Henlys Roundabout, which is in Hounslow West. From there a WNW route passes Heathrow Airport, terminals 1 to 3 and terminal 5 as the Bath Road and a WSW route, the A30, passes terminal 4, bypasses Staines and reaches the M25; the remainder is a mostly-minor route to Land's End, Cornwall.

The M4 motorway is two miles north; its nearest junction, J3, being northwest along the A312.

The A315 is the historic WSW road out of London, on which Hounslow's High Street is placed. To the east, it bisects Isleworth, Brentford and Chiswick. To the west it bisects North Feltham and Bedfont before joining the A30.

=== North-south roads ===
The north–south A312, The Parkway, to the west of Hounslow leads south to Hampton or north to Harrow passing Waggoners' Roundabout (WNW of Henlys Roundabout in Hounslow West), Hayes, Yeading and Northolt.

Three minor roads converge on Heston from the A315 in parts of Hounslow, the A3063, A3005 and B363. The single road re-divides just north in Norwood Green into a northwest road to Southall (the A3005) and into the A4127 that passes by Hanwell, briefly using the A4020 west before bypassing Dormers Wells, passing Greenford to reach Sudbury, the town immediately to the west of Wembley and North Wembley.

For longer journeys north, the M4, A4 or A30 then M25 provides the best routes. For longer journeys south, Hanworth Road leads to the A316 that becomes the M3 motorway.

=== Trains and underground ===
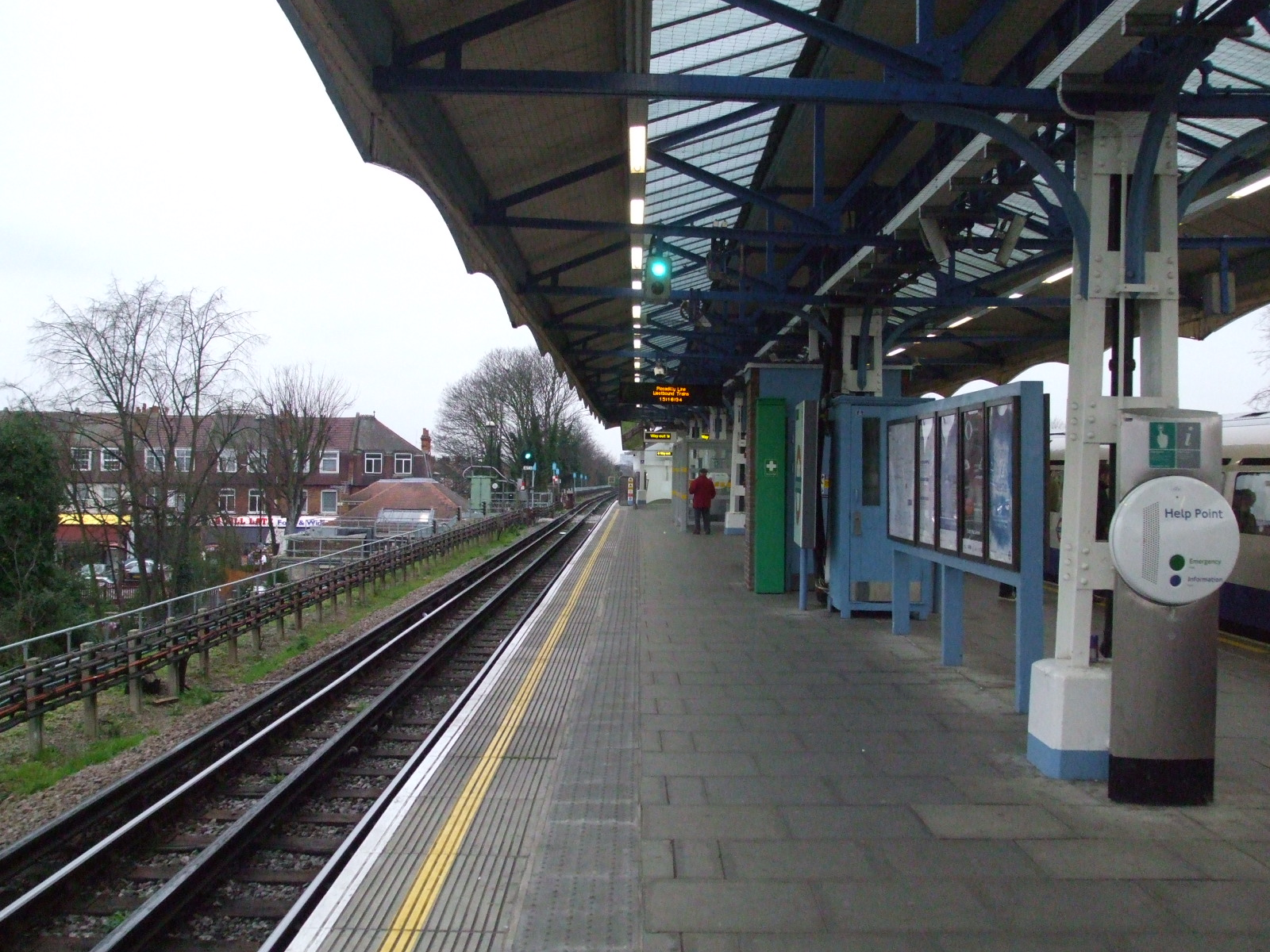
Hounslow Central tube station

There are three London Underground stations in the town; Hounslow East, Hounslow Central and Hounslow West, all on the Piccadilly line. The District line used to operate services to Hounslow, and the town also has abandoned stations on the old line, such as Hounslow Town.

Hounslow railway station, operated by South Western Railway, is on the Hounslow Loop Line, opened in 1850.

=== Bus services ===
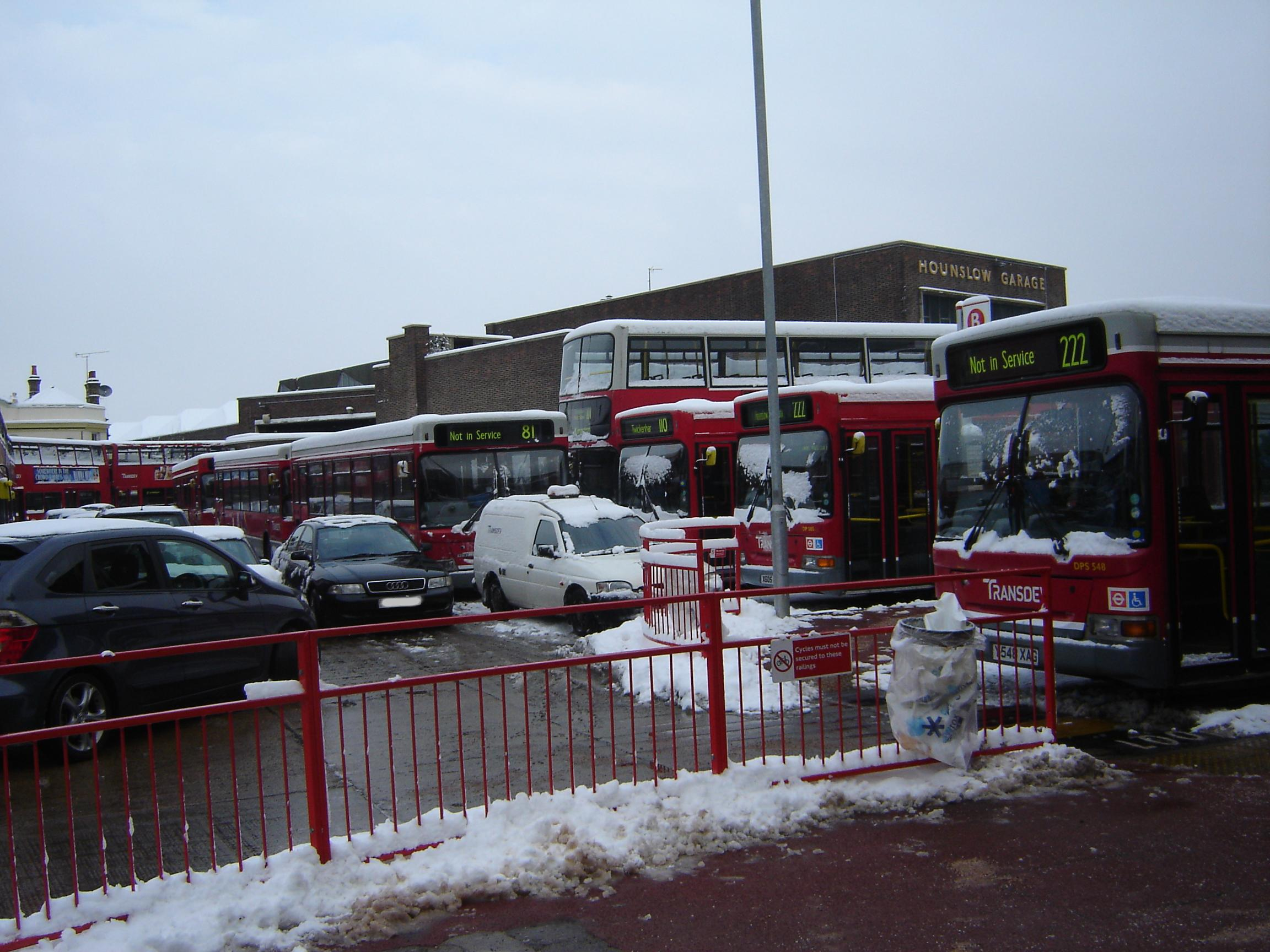
London United buses confined to Hounslow bus station during the 2009 snowfall

Hounslow bus garage and an adjoining bus station are close to the High Street. In 1962, as a result of the final stage of the London trolleybus programme of conversion to motor bus operation, when Isleworth garage was closed, the staff from that depot (coded IH) were transferred to Hounslow. The property is owned by the RATP Group, which took it over with the purchase of London United from Transdev.

In addition to its frequent and regular daytime services throughout the surrounding areas, Hounslow is served by the N9 night service from Heathrow Airport to Central London.

== Education ==
St Mark's Catholic School is on Bath Road. Lampton School was previously Spring Grove Grammar School, in the area of Lampton. Kingsley Academy was formerly known as Hounslow Manor School and Hounslow Heath School, formally known as Hounslow Heath Infant and Nursery School and Hounslow Heath Junior School before they merged, in Selwyn Close.

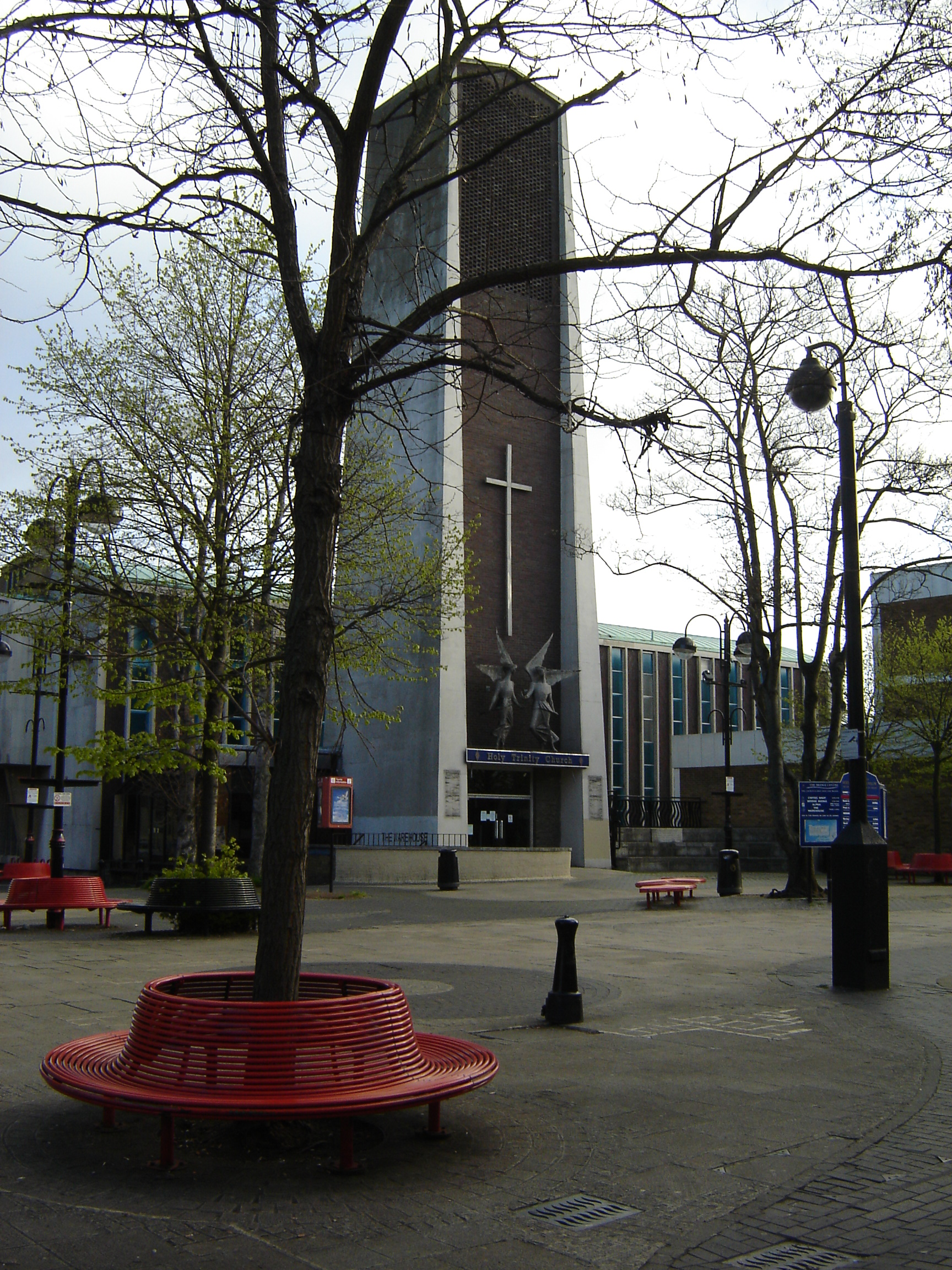
Holy Trinity Church before renovation of Hounslow High Street

== Religious sites ==
Due to the town's large South Asian community, Hounslow has a large array of religious sites to cater to the large Muslim, Hindu and Sikh communities as well as the Christian community.

Churches include Our Lady Queen of Apostles, Holy Trinity Church, Hounslow Methodist Church, Hounslow Spiritualist Centre, Hounslow Pentecostal Church, Maswell Park Church, Hounslow URC Church, St Paul's Church, St Stephen's Church, Hounslow United Reformed Church, St Michael & St Martin Church, Christian Community Church, Hounslow Pentecostal Church, Hounslow West Evangelical Church, Emmanuel Baptist Church, Hounslow Spiritualist Church, St John's Mar Thoma Church, Christ Embassy and Heston Methodist Church.

Gurdwaras include Gurdwara Sri Guru Singh Sabha and Gurdwara Guru Nanak Nishkam Sewak Jatha.

Mandirs include the Lakshmi Narayan Temple and Jalaram Jupadi.

Mosques situated in the area include Hounslow Central Mosque, Hounslow Muslim Center, Mosque of Jummah Prayer, Islamic Integration Community Centre, Al-Furqan Education Trust and Madina Islamic Mission.

== Sport ==
A printed programme dated 7 July 1935 suggests that there may have been a motorcycle speedway race at a venue in Dockwell Lane, Feltham, branded as the Hounslow Speedway. Information suggests that more than one meeting was staged in conjunction with the Hounslow Motorcycle and Car Club.

In the late 20th century, Hounslow Hockey Club was successful at a national level but has since merged with Barnes Hockey Club. Hounslow Heath Golf Centre, situated on the western side of the Heath, closed in 2016.

The 2002 film Bend It Like Beckham is set in Hounslow, depicting a fictional football team called The Hounslow Harriers.

The Irish Guards GAA club is based in Hounslow.

== In popular culture ==
Alfred Doolittle from George Bernard Shaw's Pygmalion was claimed to have been raised in Hounslow.

The 2002 film Bend It Like Beckham is set in Hounslow and depicts a fictional football team called the Hounslow Harriers.

== Climate ==
There is a weather station at nearby Heathrow Airport. Like the rest of Britain, Hounslow has an oceanic climate - one of the warmest climates in the UK.

Climate data for London Heathrow Airport, 1991–2020, extremes 1948–
Month	Jan	Feb	Mar	Apr	May	Jun	Jul	Aug	Sep	Oct	Nov	Dec	Year
Record high °C (°F)	16.0 (60.8)	20.0 (68.0)	23.4 (74.1)	27.9 (82.2)	31.7 (89.1)	33.9 (93.0)	40.2 (104.4)	37.9 (100.2)	33.0 (91.4)	28.8 (83.8)	23.0 (73.4)	16.4 (61.5)	40.2 (104.4)
Mean daily maximum °C (°F)	8.3 (46.9)	8.9 (48.0)	11.6 (52.9)	14.9 (58.8)	18.2 (64.8)	21.4 (70.5)	23.7 (74.7)	23.3 (73.9)	20.1 (68.2)	15.7 (60.3)	11.4 (52.5)	8.6 (47.5)	15.6 (60.1)
Daily mean °C (°F)	5.5 (41.9)	5.8 (42.4)	7.9 (46.2)	10.5 (50.9)	13.6 (56.5)	16.8 (62.2)	19.0 (66.2)	18.7 (65.7)	15.8 (60.4)	12.2 (54.0)	8.4 (47.1)	5.9 (42.6)	11.7 (53.1)
Mean daily minimum °C (°F)	2.7 (36.9)	2.8 (37.0)	4.1 (39.4)	6.0 (42.8)	9.0 (48.2)	12.0 (53.6)	14.2 (57.6)	14.0 (57.2)	11.4 (52.5)	8.7 (47.7)	5.3 (41.5)	3.2 (37.8)	7.8 (46.0)
Record low °C (°F)	−9.6 (14.7)	−9.6 (14.7)	−5.1 (22.8)	−2.4 (27.7)	−1.5 (29.3)	2.9 (37.2)	5.6 (42.1)	4.9 (40.8)	1.7 (35.1)	−3.3 (26.1)	−6.5 (20.3)	−12 (10)	−12 (10)
Average precipitation mm (inches)	49.18 (1.94)	41.85 (1.65)	34.36 (1.35)	36.23 (1.43)	42.14 (1.66)	36.73 (1.45)	40.27 (1.59)	55.01 (2.17)	41.82 (1.65)	53.32 (2.10)	59.59 (2.35)	49.75 (1.96)	540.25 (21.27)
Source: meteostat.net
