= 2010 local electoral calendar =

Worldwide local elections held in 2010

This local electoral calendar for the year 2010 lists the subnational elections held in 2010 in the de jure and de facto sovereign states. By-elections and sub-national referendums are also included.

== January ==
- 17 January: Switzerland, Neuchâtel, Council of States by-election
- 24 January: Switzerland, Solothurn, Council of States by-election

== February ==
- 6 February: United States, New Orleans, Mayor and City Council (1st round)

== March ==
- 2 March: United States, Oklahoma City, Mayor
- 3 March: Netherlands, Municipal
- 5 March: New Zealand, Botany
- 6 March: United States, New Orleans, City Council (2nd round)
- 7 March: Switzerland
  - Appenzell Ausserrhoden, referendum
  - Basel-Landschaft, referendum
  - Basel-Stadt, referendum
  - Fribourg, referendums
  - Geneva, referendum
  - Glarus, Executive Council
  - Grisons, referendum
  - Jura, referendum
  - Lucerne, referendum
  - Nidwalden, Executive Council (1st round) and Landrat
  - Obwalden, Executive Council and Cantonal Council
  - Schaffhausen, referendums
  - Solothurn, referendum
  - St. Gallen, referendum
  - Thurgau, referendum
  - Ticino, referendum
  - Uri, Council of States by-election
  - Zug, referendums
  - Zürich City, Council
- 14 March: Novosibirsk, Council of Deputies
- 28 March: Switzerland, Bern, Executive Council and Grand Council
  - Bernese Jura, Council

== April ==
- 6 April: United States, Anchorage, Assembly
- 9 April: India, Assam, Bodoland, Territorial Council
- 13 April: United States, Long Beach, Mayor and City Council (1st round)
- 24 April: Bangladesh, Bhola-3, House of the Nation by-election
- 25 April: Switzerland, Appenzell Innerrhoden, Landsgemeinde

== May ==
- 2 May: Switzerland
  - Glarus, Landsgemeinde
  - Nidwalden, Executive Council (2nd round) and referendum
- 3 May: India, Tripura, Tripura Tribal Areas Autonomous District, Council
- 6 May: United Kingdom
- 8 May: United States, Arlington, City Council
- 9 May:
  - Germany, Dortmund, Lord Mayor
  - Uruguay, Municipal
- 10 May: Philippines, Governors
- 18 May: United States, Portland, City Commission (1st round)
- 24 May: Papua New Guinea, Bougainvillean president
- 26 May: India, Manipur
  - Chandel Autonomous District, Council
  - Churachandpur Autonomous District, Council
  - Sadar Hills Autonomous District, Council
- 27 May: Isle of Man, Douglas East, House of Keys by-election
- 30 May: Glarus, Landrat

== June ==
- 1 June: Egypt, Shoura
- 2 June: India, Manipur
  - Senapati Autonomous District, Council
  - Tamenglong Autonomous District, Council
  - Ukhrul Autonomous District, Council
- 7 June: India, Assam
  - Jorhat District, Thengal Kachari Autonomous Council
  - Kamrup District, Morigaon District and Nagaon District, Tiwa Autonomous Council
  - Lakhimpur District, Deori Autonomous Council
- 8 June:
  - Egypt, Shoura
  - United States
    - Fresno, City Council (1st round)
    - Long Beach, City Council (2nd round)
    - Los Angeles County, Board of Supervisors
    - Orange County, CA, Board of Supervisors (1st round)
    - Riverside County, Board of Supervisors
    - Sacramento, City Council
    - San Bernardino County, Board of Supervisors (1st round)
    - San Diego County, Board of Supervisors (1st round)
      - San Diego, City Council (1st round) and Referendums
    - San Francisco, Referendums
    - Santa Clara County, Board of Supervisors (1st round)
      - San Jose, Mayor and City Council (1st round)
- 10 June: Bangladesh, Chittagong, Mayor and City Corporation
- 13 June: Switzerland
  - Aargau, referendums
  - Appenzell Ausserrhoden, referendums
  - Basel-Landschaft, referendums
  - Basel-Stadt, referendums
  - Grisons, Executive Council and Grand Council (1st round)
  - Lucerne, referendums
  - Solothurn, referendums
  - Uri, referendums
  - Zürich, referendums
- 18 June: Trinidad and Tobago

== July ==
- 4 July: Switzerland, Grisons, Grand Council (2nd round)
- 16 July: Jersey, Senatorial by-election
- 20 July: Liberia, River Gee-3, House of Representatives by-election (1st round)

== August ==
- 3 August: Liberia, River Gee-3, House of Representatives by-election (2nd round)
- 24 August: United States
  - Mesa, City Council
  - Miami-Dade County, County Commission (1st round)
- 29 August: Switzerland, Schaffhausen, referendum

== September ==
- 17 September: Auckland, New Zealand
- 18 September: United States, Honolulu, City Council (1st round)
- 26 September: Switzerland
  - Basel-Landschaft, referendums
  - Basel-Stadt, referendum
  - Bern, referendum
  - Geneva, referendums
  - Lucerne, referendum
  - Neuchâtel, referendum
  - Nidwalden, referendum
  - Obwalden, referendums
  - Schwyz, referendum
  - Solothurn, referendums
  - St. Gallen, referendums
  - Uri, referendums
  - Vaud, referendums
  - Zürich, referendums

== October ==
- 3 October:
  - Hungary, Local elections
  - Switzerland, Zug, Executive Council and Cantonal Council
  - Brazil, Governors (1st round) and Legislative Assemblies
- 16 October: India, Ladakh, Leh District, Ladakh Autonomous Hill Development Council
- 21, 24, 28 October, 1, 9, 20 November: India, Bihar state assembly
- 24 October: Switzerland, Jura, Government (1st round) and Parliament
- 25 October: Philippines, Local
- 31 October:
  - Ukraine, Local
  - Brazil, Governors (2nd round)

== November ==
- 1 November: India, Banka, House of the People by-election
- 2 November:
  - Federated States of Micronesia
    - Kosrae, Governor, Lieutenant Governor (1st round) and State Legislature
    - Yap, Governor and State Legislature
  - United States, Governors (36/50)
    - Navajo Nation, President, Board of Education, Board of Election Supervisors, Council and Referendum
    - Washington, D.C., Mayor and Council
    - Bakersfield, City Council
    - Bexar County, Commissioners Court
    - Broward County, Commission
    - Clark County, County Commission
    - Cook County, Assessor, Board of Commissioners, Board of Commissioners President, Board of Review, Clerk, Sheriff, Treasurer and Water Reclamation District Board
    - Dallas County, Commissioners Court
    - Fresno, City Council (2nd round)
    - Harris County, Commissioners Court
    - Honolulu, City Council (2nd round)
    - Louisville, Mayor and Metropolitan Council
    - Miami-Dade County, County Commission (2nd round)
    - Oakland, Mayor and City Council
    - Orange County, Board of Supervisors (2nd round)
    - Portland, City Commission (2nd round)
    - San Bernardino County, Board of Supervisors (2nd round)
    - San Diego County, Board of Supervisors (2nd round)
      - San Diego, City Council (2nd round) and Referendums
    - San Francisco, Board of Supervisors, Assessor-Recorder, Public Defender and Referendums
    - Santa Clara County, Board of Supervisors (2nd round)
      - San Jose, City Council (2nd round)
    - Tarrant County, Commissioners Court
    - Virginia Beach, City Council
    - Wayne County, Executive and Commission
- 7 November: Greece, Municipalities
- 14 November: Switzerland, Jura, Government (2nd round)
- 18 November: India, Mizoram, Lai Autonomous District, Council
- 28 November:
  - Catalonia (Spain), Parliament
  - Switzerland, Basel-Landschaft, referendum
    - Basel-Stadt, referendum
    - Geneva, referendums
    - Jura, referendums
    - Schaffhausen, referendum
    - Ticino, referendums
    - Uri, referendums
    - Zug, referendums

== December ==
- 5 December: Venezuela, Regional
- 20 December: Jamaica, Saint Ann North Eastern, House of Representatives by-election
