= Lou Papan =

American politician

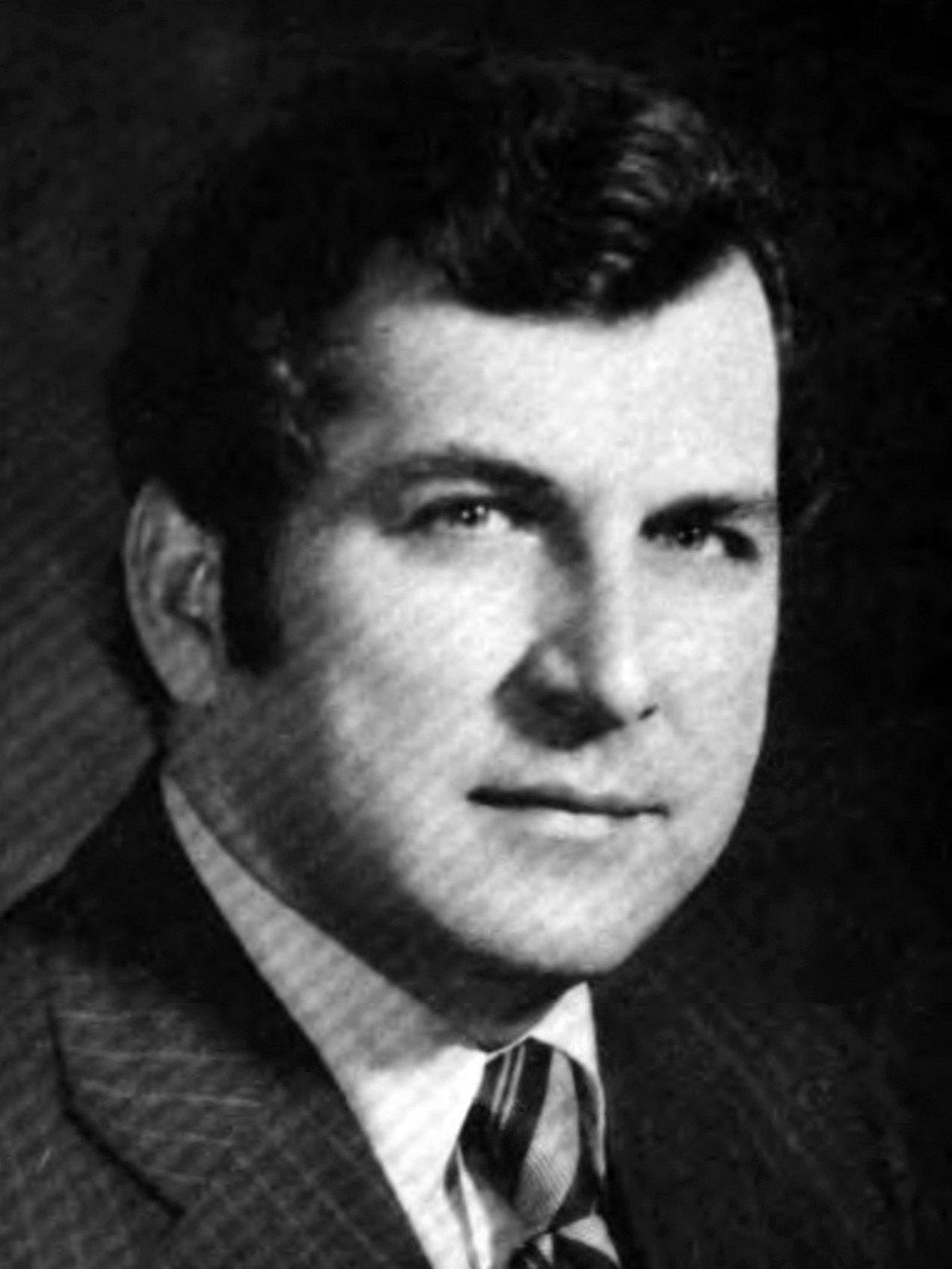
- Official portrait, 1975

Member of the California State Assembly
- In office December 2, 1996 – November 30, 2002
- Preceded by: Jackie Speier
- Succeeded by: Gene Mullin
- Constituency: 19th district
- In office January 8, 1973 – November 30, 1986
- Preceded by: Leo Ryan
- Succeeded by: Jackie Speier
- Constituency: 27th district (1973–1974); 19th district (1986–1996)

Member of the Daly City Council
- In office 1970–1972

Personal details
- Born: August 2, 1928 Springfield, Massachusetts, U.S.
- Died: April 28, 2007 (aged 78) Millbrae, California, U.S.
- Party: Democratic
- Spouse: Irene C. Damis (m. 1958; died 2000)
- Children: 3, including Diane
- Occupation: Politician

Louis John Papan (August 2, 1928 – April 28, 2007) was a Democratic California politician. He was known as the "Dean of the Assembly" for his 20 years in the California State Assembly.

== Early life ==
The son of Greek immigrants from Peloponnesus, he was originally to be named Elias Papandricopoulos (Greek: Ηλίας Παπανδρικόπουλος Ilías Papandrikópoulos), but the doctor did not know how to spell the name, and thus he was named Louis Papan. Lou Papan spoke only Greek when he began elementary school. Papan was born in Springfield, Massachusetts. He served as a Sergeant in the U.S. Army during World War II and a First Lieutenant in the U.S. Air Force during the Korean War. He received his BA in Economics in 1951 from Syracuse University in New York. After graduating from Syracuse, Papan was a Special Agent in the FBI in San Francisco and Chicago. He became a real estate broker and general insurance agent in 1958 and co-founded the Peninsula Bank of Commerce in 1981.

== Public office ==
In 1970, he was elected to the Daly City Council. He was first elected to the California State Assembly in 1972, where he served until 1986. Papan served as Speaker Pro Tempore from 1974 to 1976, and chaired the powerful Assembly Rules Committee from 1976 to 1986. Instead of seeking reelection to an eighth term in the Assembly in 1986, Papan ran for the 8th State Senate District seat but was defeated by independent candidate Quentin L. Kopp.

After leaving office in 1986, Papan was succeeded by Jackie Speier and did not return to the Assembly until 1996 when Speier vacated the seat. Papan was re-elected in 1998 and 2000 with over 70% of the vote in his district. Papan was the Chair of the Assembly Banking and Finance Committee.

In 2006, Papan again ran for the State Senate in the 8th District - but came in third place in the Democratic primary, losing to Leland Yee.

== Family ==
Papan's wife of 42 years, Irene, died from cancer and lupus in 2000. They had a son named John, and two daughters Diane, and Virginia, who goes by Gina. Diane practices law in San Francisco, and Gina formerly worked as a Deputy Attorney General and now is the Deputy Director of the California Office of Criminal Justice Planning. In December 2015, Gina rejoined Millbrae's city council after having served two terms starting in 2005, after being required to take a break of at least a two-years per the city's term limits. In that same month, December 2015, Diane joined the city council of nearby San Mateo, which was perhaps the first instance of siblings serving concurrently on two different city councils in San Mateo County.

In addition to serving as mayors and city council members, both sisters have also run for California State Assembly, Gina ran two unsuccessful campaigns for California's 19th State Assembly district in the early 2000s. This district was renumbered in 2011 and 2021, and in January 2022, Diane announced she would join the race for this district, which following the 2021 renumeration became California's 21st State Assembly district. Kevin Mullin, son of Papan's successor as representative for California's 19th Assembly district, Gene Mullin, and incumbent in the same seat in 2022, announced that he would not seek reelection, and that he would join the race for California's 14th congressional district, after Jackie Speier—aforementioned successor and predecessor to Papan as representative for California's 19th Assembly district—announced she would not seek reelection in California's 14th district in November 2021.

Papan was nicknamed "Leadfoot Lou" for his fast commutes between Sacramento and his Peninsula home, trips that brought him a good share of speeding tickets. Few people knew he raced home to be with his son John, who suffered from a rare congenital condition that eventually ended his life at age 21 in 1981. The family set up John's Closet—an organization that provides new clothes for needy children. Papan was well known as an advocate for disabled children.

=== Memorial tributes ===
- Governor Arnold Schwarzenegger said, "Lou Papan was a dedicated public servant who devoted himself to improving the lives of all Californians. From Daly City Councilmember to chairman of the state Assembly Rules Committee, Lou's hard work and distinguished service is an inspiration to all. Maria and I offer our deepest condolences to Lou's family during this difficult time."
- Congressman Tom Lantos placed the following statement in the Congressional Record: "I rise with sadness today to share with my colleagues in the House news of the death of a California public servant from my home district. Lou Papan, known as the "Dean" of the California State Assembly, died unexpectedly on Saturday, April 28, 2007. He was 78 years old. Lou Papan was practically a force of nature in state and local politics."
- "He was an incredible guy," said Alex Tourk, who worked on his Assembly staff for four years. "He was one of those rare politicians who would advocate publicly what he believed privately."
- Known as "The Enforcer" for his ability to shepherd votes, Lou Papan's shadow was cast large in Sacramento, over both opponents and supporters.

== Awards and honors ==
- Papan received the Ellis Island Medal of Honor in 1996. The award is given by the National Ethnic Coalition of Organizations (NECO) to ethnic Americans who have made significant contributions to this country.
- The California State Legislature renamed a section of Highway 1, from the Daly City border south through the City of Pacifica along the scenic coast, as the "Louis J. Papan Highway." He is given credit for successfully securing funding to purchase beachfront property in Pacifica for the State Parks system.

== Personal life ==
Papan died on April 28, 2007, after a heart attack at his home in Millbrae, California.

Political offices
Preceded by Bud Lycett	Member, Daly City Council; 1970–1972	Succeeded by Victor Kyriakis
California Assembly
Preceded by Leo Ryan	California State Assemblymember; 27th District; 1972–1974	Succeeded by John Thurman
Preceded by Leo McCarthy	California State Assemblymember; 19th District; 1974–1986	Succeeded by Jackie Speier
Preceded by Jackie Speier	California State Assemblymember; 19th District; 1996–2002	Succeeded by Gene Mullin
