= Reset San Francisco =

Government website

Reset San Francisco is a Gov 2.0 website founded by Phil Ting, the assessor-recorder for the city of San Francisco. Launched in August 2010, the website is designed to give the residents of San Francisco Web 2.0 tools through which to engage in city issues. Its main purpose is to encourage civic discussion which it does through a number of forums focusing on themes such as education, jobs and tax reform. In addition it includes online polls and petitions on particular issues. It is an example of an increasing trend towards user generated government to give people more avenues through which to participate in politics.

== Campaigns ==
Although the website states itself primarily as a venue for the sharing of ideas, it has taken a position and led campaigns on certain issues.

=== Parking Tickets ===
In January 2011 Phil Ting used the website to criticize what he argued was the writing of excessive parking tickets in order to boost city tax revenue. 2,700 people signed the Reset San Francisco petition calling for a change in ticketing policy. Users of the website responded by calling for San Francisco to adopt a system similar to the "One-Click Hearings" recently established in New York City. This system allows New Yorkers to contest unfair parking tickets by submitting evidence online. The system claims to streamline the appeals process making the system fairer and more efficient.

=== Twitter Tax break ===
Following the news that San Francisco has plans to give a large tax break to the local company, Twitter, the website held a discussion to try to establish a consensus on the issue. A website poll showed 45% in favor, 44% opposed with the remaining 11% unsure. With no strong consensus the site ran dueling petitions on the issue.

=== YouTube Testimony ===
In March 2010 Phil Ting and Reset San Francisco established an online campaign, petitioning City Hall to accept YouTube videos on the same basis as conventional public testimonial. The campaign aims to make it more convenient for the public to engage in city politics by using online tools. The current system requires citizens to attend city meetings which are generally held during regular working hours, preventing many working people from being able to participate in the political process. Ting's campaign argues that being busy should not prevent people from being involved, and that YouTube technology is a way to overcome this.

== Food For Thought ==
Reset San Francisco ran a community event in Golden Gate park on February 26 named Food for Thought. Over 250 citizens of San Francisco attended the event to discuss possible solutions to the city's problems. The participants split into various groups each leading discussion on a different theme such as transportation, housing and the environment. This was the first of several events intended to harness the discussion of the online community to help facilitate real world political engagement.
