= California's 19th district =

California's 19th district may refer to:

- California's 19th congressional district
- California's 19th State Assembly district
- California's 19th State Senate district
