= Elwood Bruner =

American politician (1854–1915)

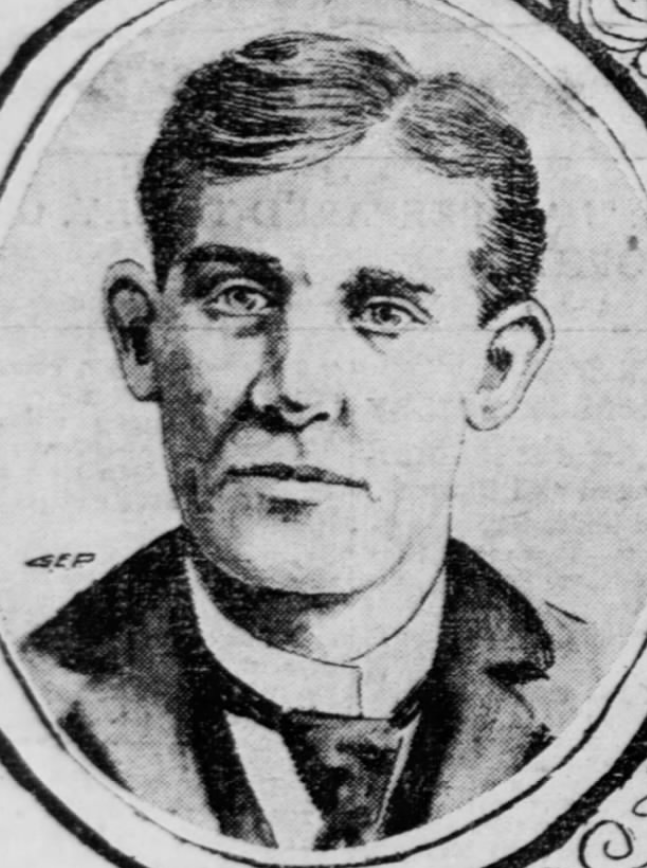

Member of the California State Assembly from the 18th district
- In office January 5, 1880 – January 3, 1881 Serving with Seymour Carr and John Young
- Preceded by: Grove L. Johnson
- Succeeded by: William Cary Van Fleet

District Attorney of Sacramento County, California
- In office January 3, 1887 – January 5, 1891
- Preceded by: Henry L. Buckley
- Succeeded by: Frank D. Ryan

Member of the California State Assembly from the 19th district
- In office January 5, 1891 – January 2, 1893
- Preceded by: Elijah Carson Hart
- Succeeded by: C. D. McCauley

Personal details
- Born: September 27, 1854 Zanesville, Ohio
- Died: January 15, 1915 Byron, California
- Party: Republican
- Spouse: Lillian J. Flint
- Children: Three daughters

Elwood Bruner (September 27, 1854 – January 15, 1915) was an American politician and lawyer.

== Biography ==
Bruner was born September 27, 1854, in Zanesville, Ohio, to Joseph Asbury Bruner, a Methodist minister, and Margaret Morris Bruner, and in 1856 went with his family to Marysville, California. In 1863 and 1864 Reverend Bruner was preaching in Sacramento.

Bruner graduated in 1874 from the University of the Pacific, when the campus was in San Jose. He then studied law in the office of Moore, Laine, Delmas & Leib, and in April 1877 he was admitted to practice before the State Supreme Court. In 1881 he became a partner with W.A. Cheney. He became Grand Master of the Stanislaus unit of the Independent Order of Odd Fellows in May 1887.

He was married to Lillian J. Flint in March 1880; they had three daughters. He died on January 15, 1915, in Byron Hot Springs, California.

== Political career ==
=== California ===
Bruner began his political life in 1879, when he was elected to the California State Assembly, and in 1883 he was elected to the board of directors of the Sacramento public school system. He was elected district attorney of Sacramento County in 1886. A Republican, he was chosen for the Assembly again in November 1890. In his first session after he was seated, he introduced bills that would (1) "appoint an inspector of petroleum or any product of it used for illuminating" and (2) give Boards of Supervisors "discretionary power to increase the police force and Police Commissioners to appoint". He was also made chairman of the Assembly Judiciary Committee. Bruner's police-force bill, which would have a major effect on the City and County of San Francisco, passed the Assembly on February 13.

In March 1891, the San Francisco Examiner published a story alleging that Bruner was promised he would be able to appoint six San Francisco policemen for his aid in pushing through the police-force bill. The allegation was made that Bruner received the sum of $400 from one Thomas Stoley for the Assemblyman's recommendation that Stoley be appointed to the force.

In a dramatic scene on March 6, 1891, in the midst of a packed State Assembly chamber — even the State Senate had adjourned its session to allow members to view the proceedings — the 36-year-old Bruner denied the accusations and instead charged Andrew M. Lawrence, the Examiner's Sacramento reporter, with attempting to blackmail him. The Assembly voted to establish an investigative committee, and Lawrence said he would be relieved of his duties by the Examiner, at his own request.

The next day, another Examiner reporter, E. J. Stillwell, filed a suit in San Francisco stating that he himself had played the part of Thomas Stoley and had paid Bruner $400 for a job on the police force but "the lawmaker has failed to keep his contract and deliver the position".

Two weeks later, after a series of hearings, an Assembly investigating committee submitted both a majority and a minority report. The majority document, signed by members A. J. Bledsoe, A. J. Jackson, F. H. Gould and John R. Mathews, found Bruner had "the intention of selling a position on the police force of San Francisco and appropriating to the use of himself and accomplices the proceeds thereof". During the session, the Assembly dissolved into "the greatest confusion", with Bruner weeping and Speaker Frank Coombs splintering his gavel "in a wild attempt to restore something like order, and several ladies were borne from the chamber in a fainting condition".

On March 24, however, the Assembly, by a vote of 40–21, rejected the majority report and adopted the minority report, which cleared Bruner of any wrongdoing except "culpable negligence in failing to confide the whole matter to some of his many friends in the Assembly" and opined that "he is deserving of the censure of this Assembly in not having secured himself and the body of which he is a member against the scandal which has been spread broadcast over the State".

The Examiner returned to the attack in June 1891, claiming that Bruner had been promised $1,000 by "ticket brokers" for his help in squelching a bill "designed to abolish the ticket-scalping business". And in October of that year Bruner was indicted by a San Francisco grand jury — one count of perjury committed while giving testimony and the other of malfeasance in office, in connection with a claim by a San Francisco ticket broker that Bruner, "in connection with McCall of Alameda" had attempted to blackmail him out of $1,000. The prosecution failed, however, when the State Supreme Court ruled that the grand jury had been improperly chosen. A new grand jury was impaneled in January 1892 but was discharged in April when it could not agree on what to do about Bruner.

In April 1892, however, warrants were issued in San Francisco on the complaint of John P. Dunn charging Bruner and former Assembly member J.E. McCall with asking a $1,000 bribe from Adolph Ottinger, a "ticket scalper", to defeat an Assembly bill titled "An Act to Prevent Fraud on Travelers". After trial, the jury disagreed, and in February 1893 a judge dismissed all charges in the case.

=== Territory of Alaska ===
In 1903, Bruner moved to Nome, Alaska Territory where he practiced law. In 1912, Bruner was elected to the Alaska Territorial Senate as an independent, and served until his death in 1915.

He died in Byron, California, where he had gone to recuperate from health problems.
