= Elijah Carson Hart =

American politician

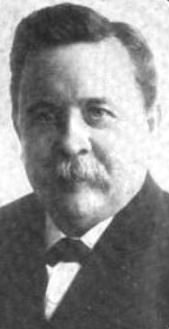

Member of the California Senate from the 13th district
- In office January 2, 1893 - January 4, 1897
- Preceded by: Findley R. Dray
- Succeeded by: Gillis Doty

Member of the California State Assembly from the 19th district
- In office January 7, 1889 - January 5, 1891
- Preceded by: Leroy S. Taylor
- Succeeded by: Elwood Bruner

Personal details
- Born: September 9, 1857 Nevada
- Died: January 18, 1929 (aged 71) Sacramento, California
- Party: Republican
- Spouse: Adaline Maria Vivian (m. 1878)
- Children: 4
- Occupation: Judge, politician

Elijah Carson (E.C.) Hart (September 9, 1857 – January 18, 1929) was a California attorney, politician, and judge who served as city attorney of Sacramento, California from 1886 to 1887 and from 1890 to 1893, and also served in the state legislature.

== Biography ==
Hart administers the oath of office to Governor Hiram Johnson for his second term, January 5, 1915

Elijah Carson Hart was born in Nevada in a covered wagon on September 9, 1857, while his parents were crossing the plains from Greene County, Indiana to California. His parents were James Hart and Sarah Owen Cavins Hart. His middle name was Carson because he was born on the banks of the Carson River. The Hart family settled in Nicolaus, California and eventually moved on to Colusa, Ca. He had little formal education and started to work at the age of twelve as an assistant to a printer in the city of Colusa. He later became a newspaper reporter, editor and publisher in Oroville. At the age of 30, in 1884, he commenced the study of law. He was admitted to practice in 1885 and was elected city attorney of Sacramento the following year. He served in the State Assembly in 1888 and 1889. He was re-elected city attorney in 1890 and served until April 1893 when he resigned to enter the California State Senate.

He was later elected superior court judge of Sacramento County and served in that capacity from 1897 to 1907. Thereafter, he was elected and served as associate justice of the Third District Court of Appeal in Sacramento for 22 years until his death in Sacramento on January 18, 1929. He was considered the dean of the State's Supreme and Appellate Court benches. His wife, Adaline (Addie) Maria Vivian, of more than 50 years was a niece of Kit Carson. She was born in Howard County, Missouri.
