= 2010 Egyptian Shura Council election =

Elections for the Shura Council were held in Egypt on 1 and 8 June 2010. From a total of 264 seats in the upper house of the Egyptian parliament, 88 are up for election every three years, another 44 are appointed by the president.

== Campaign ==
Out of 446 candidates for elections, 115 were from political parties and 331 were independents.

== Conduct ==
معظم دول العالم لا يوجد فيها إشراف قضائي على الانتخابات ومع ذلك تكون نزيهة وحيادية
Most of the world has no judicial supervision on elections, however, those elections are fair and impartial.

— Gamal Mubarak, in a press conference

The election was not under any national court or international supervision. The General Secretary of the Policy Committee in the National Democratic Party Gamal Mubarak said in a press conference that, "This issue is governed by the law and the constitution which made it possible for civil society organizations to monitor the elections". The Secretary of Education in the NDP, Mohamed Kamal, said that the party welcomes the supervision of national organizations, but refuses international monitoring. He also added that the abolition of judicial supervision of elections does not affect the integrity of the elections.

== Results ==
Party	Seats		
Party	First round	Second round	Total
National Democratic Party	74	6	80
Arab Democratic Nasserist Party	1	0	1
Democratic Generation Party	1	0	1
National Progressive Unionist Party	1	0	1
El-Ghad Party	1	0	1
Independents	0	4	4
Total	78	10	88
Source: IPU
