= Byron Sher =

American politician (1928–2026)

Byron D. Sher

Member of the California State Senate from the 11th district
- In office March 28, 1996 – December 6, 2004
- Preceded by: Tom Campbell
- Succeeded by: Joe Simitian

Member of the California State Assembly from the 21st district
- In office December 1, 1980 – March 28, 1996
- Preceded by: Victor Calvo
- Succeeded by: Ted Lempert

Personal details
- Born: February 7, 1928 St. Louis, Missouri, U.S.
- Died: September 12, 2026 (aged 98) Near Placerville, California, U.S.
- Party: Democratic
- Spouse: Linda Bowser (m. 1954; died 2014)
- Children: 3
- Education: Washington University in St. Louis; Harvard Law School
- Occupation: Politician, law professor
- Profession: Attorney

Byron David Sher (February 7, 1928 – September 12, 2026) was an American Democratic politician. He served in the California State Senate from 1996 to 2004, prior to which, he served in the California State Assembly between 1980 and 1996. (Sher was first elected to the State Senate by winning a special election for the 11th District seat on March 26, 1996.) Sher was also a longtime professor at Stanford Law School. He served as the California Senate Rules Committee appointee to the Tahoe Regional Planning Agency from 2009 to 2012.

== Early life and education ==
Sher was born in St. Louis, Missouri, on February 7, 1928. He received his BA from Washington University in St. Louis and his JD from Harvard Law School. Sher was also a Fulbright research scholar.

== Teaching career ==
Sher joined the faculty of Stanford Law School in 1957 and taught there for thirty years. He was an emeritus professor there as of the 2009-2010 academic year. He also taught law at Harvard Law School, Southern Methodist University, the University of Southern California.

== Pre-assembly political career ==
Sher served on the Palo Alto City Council from 1965 to 1967, and from 1973 to 1980. He served as mayor from 1974 to 1975 and from 1977 to 1978.

== Legislative accomplishments ==
Sher was a major environmental proponent during his time in the legislature. Major legislative accomplishments of his include the Groundwater Protection Act (1983), California Clean Air Act (1988), and the California Safe Drinking Water Act (1989). He was the chairman of the Natural Resources Committee for 11 years.

He authored a bill, signed by Jerry Brown, that increased the statute of limitations for rape from three years to six in response to the fact that many serial rapists—such as Melvin Carter—were able to avoid or partially avoid prosecution due to the shorter limit expiring.

Near the end of his legislative career, the San Mateo County Board of Supervisors designated January 30, 2004, as Byron Sher Day, calling him "the most effective environmental legislator in the state".

== Personal life and death ==
Sher was married to Linda Bowser (1932–2014), and they have three children and five grandchildren. They lived together in Palo Alto, California, for many decades. He was Jewish.

Sher died at his ranch near Placerville, California, on September 12, 2026, at the age of 98.
