= Frank Lee Crist =

American politician

Member of the California State Assembly from the 30th district
- In office January 2, 1933 - January 7, 1935
- Preceded by: J. P. Hayes
- Succeeded by: H. Dewey Anderson

Member of the California State Assembly from the 21st district
- In office January 5, 1931 - January 2, 1933
- Preceded by: Frederick C. Hawes
- Succeeded by: Joseph P. Gilmore

Personal details
- Born: August 22, 1898 Clarksville, Arkansas
- Died: April 15, 1991 (aged 92)
- Party: Republican

Military service
- Branch/service: United States Army
- Battles/wars: World War I

Frank Lee Crist was a United States Republican politician.

Crist served in the United States Army during World War I. He served in the California legislature representing the 30th District from 1933 to 1935.
