= Frederick C. Hawes =

American politician

Member of the California State Assembly from the 22nd district
- In office January 5, 1931 - January 2, 1933
- Preceded by: James C. Flynn
- Succeeded by: James A. Miller

Member of the California State Assembly from the 21st district
- In office January 8, 1917 - January 5, 1931
- Preceded by: Walter A. McDonald
- Succeeded by: Frank Lee Crist

Personal details
- Born: January 22, 1875 Waco, Texas
- Died: March 5, 1933 (aged 58)
- Party: Republican

Military service
- Branch/service: United States Army
- Battles/wars: World War I

Frederick C. Hawes (January 22, 1875 - March 5, 1933) served as a Republican in the California State Assembly for the 21st and 22nd district. During World War I he served in the United States Army.

== Life and death ==
He was born in Waco, Texas on January 22, 1875, and died on March 12, 1933, from pneumonia.
