= J. P. Hayes (politician) =

American politician

Member of the California State Assembly from the 30th district
- In office January 5, 1931 - January 2, 1933
- Preceded by: Robert B. Fry
- Succeeded by: Frank Lee Crist

Personal details
- Born: March 15, 1895 San Francisco, California
- Died: October 10, 1964 (aged 69) California
- Party: Republican
- Spouse: Josephine See
- Children: 2

Military service
- Branch/service: United States Army
- Battles/wars: World War I

John Patrick Hayes II served in the California State Assembly for the 30th district and during World War I he served in the United States Army.
