= Reese Clark =

American politician (1847–1921)

Member of the California State Assembly from the 21st district
- In office January 5, 1891 - January 5, 1893
- Preceded by: Levi B. Adams
- Succeeded by: H. C. Chipman

Personal details
- Born: November 19, 1847 Missouri
- Died: May 26, 1921 (aged 73) Calistoga, California
- Party: Republican
- Spouse: Florence L.
- Children: 9

Military service
- Branch/service: United States Army
- Rank: Private (bugler)
- Unit: Company A, 1st Oregon Cavalry Regiment
- Battles/wars: Civil War

Reese Clark (September 19, 1847 - May 26, 1921) was a California Assemblymen serving the 21st district from 1891 to 1891. He also served as a private (bugler) in Company A, 1st Oregon Cavalry Regiment of the Union Army during the American Civil War from 1860 to 1865.
