= Victor Calvo =

American politician

Member of the California State Assembly from the 21st district
- In office December 2, 1974 - November 30, 1980
- Preceded by: Gordon W. Duffy
- Succeeded by: Byron Sher

Personal details
- Born: February 13, 1924 Mountain View, California
- Died: September 26, 2010 (aged 86) Mountain View, California
- Party: Democratic
- Spouse: Nellie Quintero (m.1948)
- Children: 5

Military service
- Branch/service: United States Army
- Battles/wars: World War II

Victor Calvo (February 13, 1924 – September 26, 2010) was a Democratic politician from California who served in the California State Assembly from 1974 until 1980.

Calvo was born in Mountain View, California and served on its city council from 1962 until 1968 and served three different years as mayor during his tenure. He served on the Santa Clara County Board of Supervisors from 1969 until he resigned to take his Assembly seat in 1974. After leaving the Assembly, Calvo served on the California Public Utilities Commission from 1981 until 1987 and the California Coastal Commission from 1987 to 1989.
