= Kevin Mullin =

American politician (born 1970)

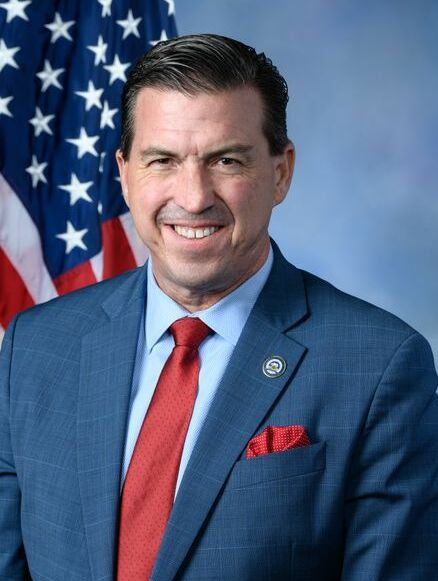
- Official portrait, 2023

Member of the U.S. House of Representatives from California's 15th district
- Incumbent
- Assumed office January 3, 2023
- Preceded by: Jackie Speier (redistricted)

Speaker pro tempore of the California State Assembly
- In office December 1, 2014 – December 5, 2022
- Preceded by: Nora Campos
- Succeeded by: Chris Ward

Member of the California State Assembly from the 22nd district
- In office December 3, 2012 – December 5, 2022
- Preceded by: Paul Fong (redistricted)
- Succeeded by: Diane Papan (redistricted)

Personal details
- Born: June 15, 1970 (age 56) Daly City, California, U.S.
- Party: Democratic
- Spouse: Jessica Stanfill
- Children: 2
- Relatives: Gene Mullin (father)
- Education: University of San Francisco (BA); San Francisco State University (MPA)
- Website: House website Campaign website

Kevin Mullin (born June 15, 1970) is an American politician serving as the U.S. representative for California's 15th congressional district since 2023. A member of the Democratic Party, he served as a member of the California State Assembly from the 22nd district, which encompasses most of the San Francisco Peninsula region, from 2012 to 2022.

Mullin is the son of Gene Mullin, who served three terms in the Assembly. Before being elected to the Assembly in 2012, he was an entrepreneur and served on the city council of South San Francisco, including one year as mayor. He served as speaker pro tempore of the Assembly from 2014 to 2022.

== Early life and education ==
Mullin was born in Daly City, California, on June 15, 1970. He attended public and Catholic elementary schools before graduating from Junípero Serra High School in 1988. He received a bachelor's degree in communications from the University of San Francisco in 1992, and a master of public administration from San Francisco State University in 1998. Additionally, Mullin completed an executive leadership program at Harvard University's Kennedy School of Government in 2003.

== Early career ==
=== Business career ===
Before entering politics, Mullin was a local business owner and district director to then-state senator Jackie Speier. He also served as political director for his father, then-state assemblymember Gene Mullin.

As an entrepreneur, Mullin founded KM2 Communications, a multimedia production business in South San Francisco. He produced public affairs programming on local television and hosted various programs on Peninsula-TV Channel 26.

=== South San Francisco City Council ===
Mullin was elected to the South San Francisco City Council in 2007. He served one term on the council, including a one-year stint as mayor.

During his time on the council, Mullin also represented the cities of San Mateo County on the Metropolitan Transportation Commission.

=== California State Assembly ===
Mullin was first elected to the Assembly in 2012. He represented the 22nd district, which encompassed most of the San Francisco Peninsula.

During his first term in the Assembly, Mullin served as assistant speaker pro tempore. He became speaker pro tempore of the Assembly in 2014, a position he held until leaving office in 2022. In this role, he regularly presided over Assembly floor sessions and continued as part of Anthony Rendon's leadership team.

Notable legislation from Mullin's tenure includes Proposition 19, which offered support for fire victims, disabled, and the elderly. This proportion narrowly passed.

Mullin left office on December 5, 2022. He was succeeded by Diane Papan.

== U.S. House of Representatives ==
=== Elections ===
==== 2022 ====
Following Speier's retirement, Mullin announced his candidacy to succeed her in the 2022 election. He defeated San Mateo County supervisor David Canepa with 55.8% of the vote. Mullin described himself as a pro-Israel lawmaker and AIPAC spent around 600k dollars for him in the general election against fellow Democrat David Canepa.

Mullin was sworn into the House of Representatives on January 7, 2023, when the 118th Congress convened.

=== Committee assignments ===
For the 118th Congress:

- Committee on Natural Resources
  - Subcommittee on Energy and Mineral Resources
  - Subcommittee on Water, Wildlife and Fisheries
- Committee on Science, Space, and Technology
  - Subcommittee on Investigations and Oversight
  - Subcommittee on Research and Technology

For the 119th Congress:

- Committee on Energy and Commerce
  - Subcommittee on Commerce, Manufacturing, and Trade
  - Subcommittee on Energy
  - Subcommittee on Oversight and Investigations

=== Caucus memberships ===
- Congressional Asian Pacific American Caucus
- Congressional Equality Caucus
- New Democrat Coalition
- Congressional Progressive Caucus
- Congressional Freethought Caucus
- Climate Solutions Caucus
- Congressional Caucus for the Equal Rights Amendment
- Black Maternal Health Caucus
- Rare Disease Caucus

=== Tenure ===
Mullin left a California hospital bed with IV attached on February 25, 2025, flying to Washington for an emergency vote against a budget resolution that same day. The resolution, favored by president Trump, was not certain to pass. At the request of the Democratic leadership several Democrats who were absent with medical issues were secretly brought to Washington for the vote. The resolution ultimately passed by the narrowest possible margin.

== Personal life ==
Mullin is married to Jessica Stanfill Mullin, with whom he has twin sons.

== Electoral history ==
Electoral history of Kevin Mullin
Year	Office		Party	Primary			General			Result	Swing	Ref.
Year	Office		Party	Total	%	P.	Total	%	P.	Result	Swing	Ref.
2012	State Assembly	22nd	Democratic	51,578	68.48%	1st	126,519	71.40%	1st	Won	Hold	
2014	State Assembly	22nd	Democratic	42,575	71.05%	1st	73,928	70.60%	1st	Won	Hold	
2016	State Assembly	22nd	Democratic	85,682	76.21%	1st	148,289	74.39%	1st	Won	Hold	
2018	State Assembly	22nd	Democratic	80,610	74.08%	1st	145,197	76.77%	1st	Won	Hold	
2020	State Assembly	22nd	Democratic	107,738	75.72%	1st	182,365	75.40%	1st	Won	Hold	
2022	U.S. House	15th	Democratic	58,806	41.11%	1st	108,077	55.46%	1st	Won	Hold	
2024	U.S. House	15th	Democratic	109,172	75.27%	1st	211,648	73.10%	1st	Won	Hold	
2026	U.S. House	15th	Democratic	107,496	65.03%	1st	TBD					
Source: Secretary of State of California | Statewide Election Results

California Assembly
Preceded by Nora Campos	Speaker pro tempore of the California Assembly; 2014–2023	Succeeded by Chris Ward
U.S. House of Representatives
Preceded by Eric Swalwell	Member of the U.S. House of Representatives from California's 15th congressional district 2023–present	Incumbent
U.S. order of precedence (ceremonial)
Preceded by Jared Moskowitz	United States representatives by seniority 340th	Succeeded by Zach Nunn
