= Gene Mullin =

American politician (1937–2021)

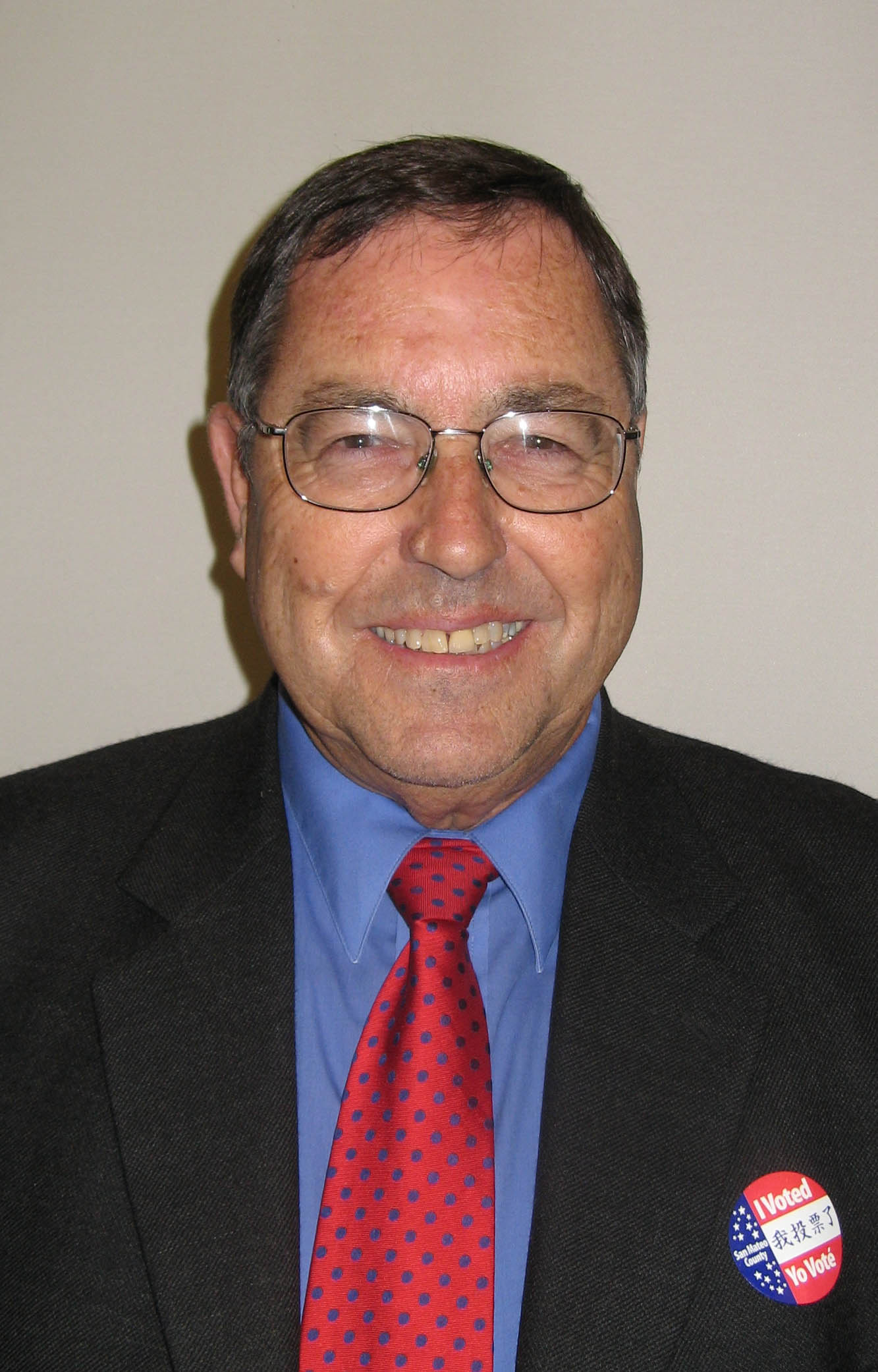
- Mullin in 2006

Mayor of South San Francisco
- In office 1997–1998
- In office 2001–2002

Member of the California State Assembly from the 19th district
- In office November 5, 2002 – November 7, 2008
- Preceded by: Lou Papan
- Succeeded by: Jerry Hill

Personal details
- Born: April 21, 1937
- Died: April 5, 2021 (aged 83) South San Francisco, California
- Party: Democratic
- Children: 2, including Kevin

Eugene Mullin (April 21, 1937 – April 5, 2021) was an American politician and teacher who served as the mayor and as the State Assembly member for South San Francisco. Mullin was a member of the Democratic Party.

== Personal life ==
Mullin was a lifelong resident of the Bay Area, and in 1967 he moved to South San Francisco to pursue teaching and coaching at South San Francisco High School. He worked there for three decades as a government teacher and basketball coach. In 1965 he married Theresa (Terri) Carrick, and they had two children, Jennifer and Kevin. His wife Terri died on April 5, 2017. His son Kevin held his former Assembly seat from 2012 to 2022 and was elected to the U.S. House of Representatives in 2022.

From 1959–60, Gene Mullin served in the U.S. Army as a part of the Judge Advocate General Corps. In 1960, he received his bachelor's degree from the University of San Francisco (USF) and in 1967 he received a lifetime secondary teaching credential from USF.

Mullin was also an author of several books and curriculums about local governments. He also received numerous awards for his teaching, public service and his political role. Mullin served as the lecturer at the Institute for Local Self Government in Sacramento from 1989 to 1997 and later he continued to serve as a lecturer at the Center for Youth Citizenship in Sacramento. He also served as the president of the South San Francisco Classroom Teachers Association from 1992 to 1995.

== Political life ==
He began his public service in 1972 when he was appointed to the South San Francisco Planning Commission, and he later served as the member of the city's Historical Preservation Commission from 1986 to 1992.

Gene served as the mayor of South San Francisco in two one-year terms, between 1997 and 1998 and again from 2001 to 2002. Between 2002 and 2008 he served three terms as a California State Assembly member representing the 19th district.

California Assembly
Preceded by Lou Papan	Assemblymember, 19th Assembly District; 2002–2008	Succeeded by Jerry Hill
