= College Terrace, Palo Alto, California =

Neighborhood in the city of Palo Alto, California

College Terrace is a neighborhood in the city of Palo Alto, California, adjacent to Stanford University.

== Layout ==
An all-residential neighborhood, College Terrace stretches 12 by two blocks. It lies between South California Avenue and Stanford Avenue, from Amherst Street to El Camino Real. College Avenue runs down the center of the neighborhood. College Terrace is directly adjacent to Escondido Village, a staff and student housing development on the southern edge of Stanford University. The neighborhood features its own branch of the Palo Alto Public Library system built in 1936 in the Spanish Colonial Revival style as a WPA project.

Four parks were part of the original plan for the College Terrace neighborhood and all still exist:

- Donaldina M. Cameron Park, located on Wellesley Street between Stanford Avenue and College Avenue. It was originally called Berkeley Park and renamed in 1968 for Donaldina Cameron, a long time resident of College Terrace who died in 1968.
- Mayfield Park, located on Wellesley Street between College Avenue and South California Avenue, next to the College Terrace Library. It was originally called Hollywood Park before being renamed in 1968.
- William C. Werry Park, located on Dartmouth Street between Stanford Avenue and College Avenue. Originally called Eton Park and was renamed for a former Palo Alto Postmaster in 1968.
- Frederick W. Weisshaar Park, also on Dartmouth Street between College Avenue and South California Avenue. Originally called Hampton Park it was renamed in 1968 for an earlier owner of the College Terrace land. He was also a Mayfield school district trustee and Mayfield's first treasurer.

There are three places of worship in College Terrace:

- Stanford SA (single adults) Ward, The Church of Jesus Christ of Latter Day Saints
- Stanford Chabad
- University Lutheran Church (ELCA)

All the cross street names in the College Terrace neighborhood are named after East Coast colleges and universities: Amherst, Bowdoin, Columbia, Cornell, Dartmouth, Harvard, Oberlin, Princeton, Wellesley, Williams and Yale.

Notable former residents of College Terrace include the architect Birge Clark, theologian Robert McAfee Brown, and folk singer Joan Baez.

== History ==
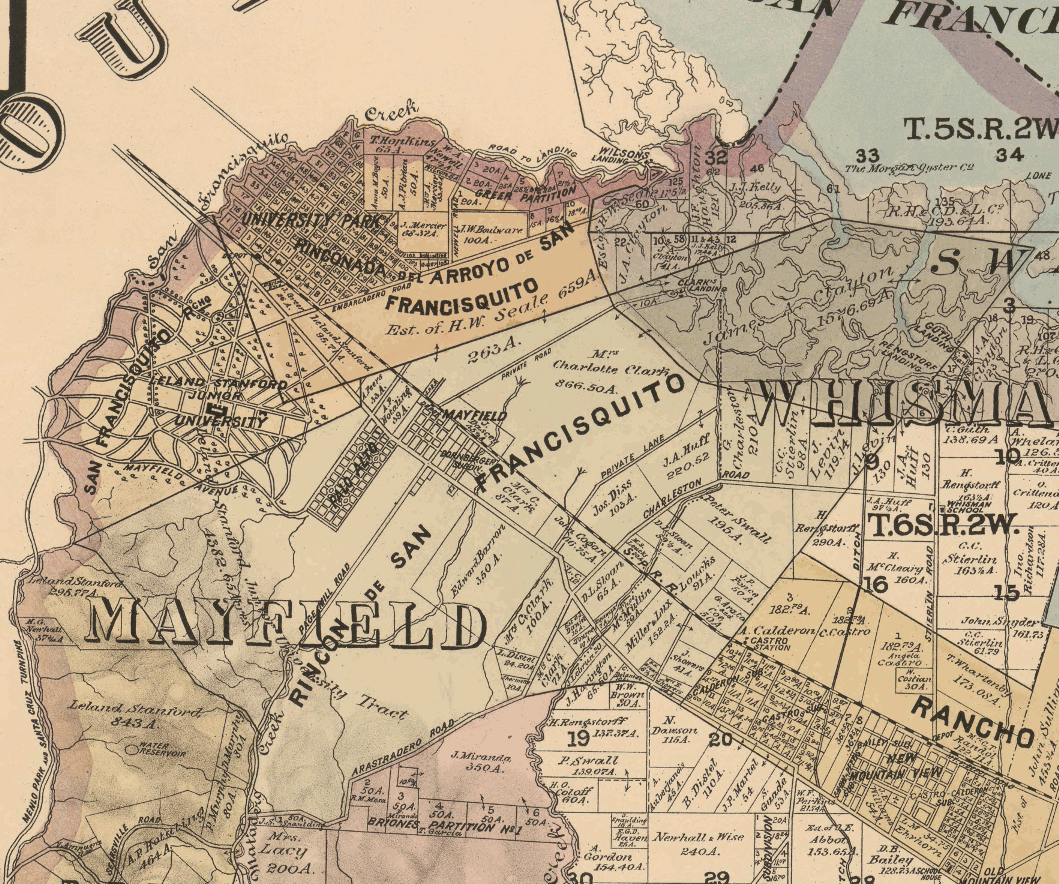
Part of an 1890 map of northern Santa Clara County including all or part of the communities of Palo Alto (which would soon become College Terrace), Mayfield, and University Park (which would soon become Palo Alto). Also shows Stanford University (still under construction at the time.)

College Terrace as a community started in 1887 when Peter Spacher and Frederick Weisshaar, who had previously refused to sell the property to Leland Stanford who owned the land on three sides of the property, sold it to Alexander Gordon. He subdivided the land and laid out and named the streets and parks. Gordon had originally called the neighborhood "Palo Alto" but changed the name to "College Terrace" at the request of Leland Stanford (the name "Palo Alto" then became the name of another local, new community which had started as "University Park"). In 1891 College Terrace was annexed by the neighboring long established community of Mayfield, and, in 1925 Mayfield, in turn, was annexed by Palo Alto.

== Crimes ==
The neighborhood also notoriously gave its name to the College Terrace Rapist, who raped at least 11 women living in the neighborhood at knifepoint between 1971 and 1979. The College Terrace Rapist eventually admitted to at least 100 rapes both in College Terrace and elsewhere in California.
