= Melvin Carter (criminal) =

Serial rapist in California

- Born: 1944 (age 81–82); Colorado, U.S.
- Other name: The College Terrace Rapist
- Status: Paroled after about 12 years on March 20, 1994
- Criminal charges: Rape; Failure to register as a sex offender
- Penalty: 25 years imprisonment

Details
- Country: United States
- State: California

Melvin Alfred Carter (born 1944) is an American serial rapist who confessed to at least 100 rapes of women in Northern California, between 1971 and 1980.

== Early life ==
Carter was born in Colorado. While intellectually gifted, he had limited social and emotional skills, and would later describe his mother as domineering. He was a successful student at the School of Mines, during which time he was arrested several times for voyeurism. He later worked as a research engineer for Kaiser Aluminum in Livermore, California.

He began to stalk women in public parks, coming up behind them and groping their breasts. Later he used ether to render his victims unconscious, groping them after they were unconscious. He spent a year in a Colorado jail for assault and assault with intent to rape. After graduating, he moved to the Bay Area, where he secured a job as a computer engineer.

== College Terrace attacks ==
Although Carter had occasionally dated women, he was never intimate with any of his dates. He became known as the College Terrace Rapist because he chose that area for many of his attacks. College Terrace is an area of about 24 blocks immediately adjacent to Escondido Village in Stanford University. Carter would first determine whether a potential victim lived alone. If she did, he would break into her residence during the day when she was at work to determine the layout so he could later move around at night. After leaving a window open, he would return at night to rape the woman. Eleven women living in College Terrace were raped at knifepoint by Carter between 1971 and 1980 and reported their attacks to police, and it is estimated that up to 20 to 25 single women in the neighborhood were raped by Carter when one includes assaults not reported to authorities. One of the rape victims, a 32-year-old lawyer named Susan, wrote about her experience for a creative writing class. She said that she did not know if being raped would be her last moment alive, and she decided to be very calm and centered.

== Other attacks ==
Carter also attacked women in San Francisco, Davis, Berkeley and other California cities. However, he became known as the College Terrace Rapist by first being identified as a serial rapist there and eventually being arrested in Palo Alto.

== Arrest, conviction and sentence ==
The attacks occurred about once per year through 1976, which was not frequently enough for residents and police to realize that all the attacks were perpetrated by one serial rapist. In July 1979, when the second rape of the year happened, the attacks were attributed to a serial rapist for the first time. By the time the fourth rape of 1979 happened, the community came together to fight back. A major manhunt was undertaken by the police with the support and urging of the community. The 300 white males living in and around the area were questioned as to possibly being the rapist. Flyers were distributed to the 30 single women living in the neighborhood warning them of the rapist. Details such as the size of women's breasts preferred by the rapist were revealed to the residents. One, Susan, was raped the night after seeing the flyer.

A decoy house was established in one residence, staffed by a female undercover officer who left her doors and windows open in an attempt to lure in the rapist. A different ploy by an officer, John Costa, ultimately led to solving the case. Costa suspected that the rapist knew that undercover officers were in the area, and was as a result intentionally lying low. Costa pretended to be called away from the area, leaving loudly with lights flashing. This caused the rapist to drop his guard, and when Costa returned more quietly, he immediately found and questioned Carter. Eventually enough evidence was found to arrest Carter.

After this arrest in 1980, Carter was charged with 23 crimes including multiple counts of rape. He was not charged with many of the rapes because the statute of limitations had expired. As a result of this case, the statute of limitations for rape in California was raised from three years to six. He was sentenced to 25 years and released in 1994 after serving about half his sentence. His release was highly controversial.

After his parole ended in 1997, he left California. In 2018, he was jailed again in Livingston County, New York after being accused of failing to register as a sex offender as required by his earlier convictions.

== Impact ==
Carter's case led directly to an increase in the statute of limitations for rape in California. The new law was authored by Assemblyman Byron Sher and was praised by law enforcement officials throughout the Bay Area. The previous statute of limitations – three years – had often been ineffective in prosecuting serial rapists because often by the time all leads could be fully explored, the time limit would have nearly expired. Six years was considered a more appropriate limit because there was precedent for that in other states – and that is about the limit beyond which witnesses' testimony might become unreliable.

== Bibliography ==
- Hickey, Eric (2009). "Sexual Predators, Paraphilia, and Murder". Serial Murderers and their Victims. Cengage Learning. ISBN 978-0-495-60081-7.
