= 2010 Liberian by-election =

The 2010 Liberian by-election held its first round on July 20 and its second round on August 3 in River Gee County's 3rd House district. The vacancy was caused by the death of Representative Albert S. Toe. The ruling Unity Party candidate Christian Snorteh Chea won the election.

== Background ==
Albert S. Toe, a former People's Redemption Council member and sitting House member representing River Gee-3, died on April 14, 2010. By late June, four candidates had been qualified to run in the resultant by-election: Christian Snorteh Chea of the ruling Unity Party (UP) and Philbert G. Toe of the major opposition Congress for Democratic Change (CDC), as well as independent candidates Francis Saywon Younge Sr. and Marcus Saylee Quenneh. Chea was former superintendent of River Gee County who had also been a member of the National Patriotic Front of Liberia during the First Liberian Civil War. The campaign for the by-election was held between June 26 and July 18. There was a debate held between the candidates.

== Election process ==
The election was held on July 20. The election was observed by the International Foundation for Electoral Systems (IFES). The preliminary results were released on July 21, showing Chea with 1022 votes (41.5% of the total) and Toe with 701 (28.4% of the total). Because no candidate received over 50% of the vote, a run-off election was required, and the same day, the date for the run-off election between Chea and Toe was announced to be August 3. The campaign for the run-off was held between July 21 and August 1.

The run-off election was held on August 3. The IFES again observed the election. Chea won the run-off election and was elected to the House.

== Results ==
The following are the results for the 2010 by-election from the NEC.

2010 River Gee County's 3rd House District By-election, Round 1
Candidate	Party	Votes	%
Christian Snorteh Chea	Unity Party	1,022	41.48
Philbert G. Toe	Congress for Democratic Change	701	28.45
Francis Saywon Younge Sr.	Independent	529	21.47
Marcus Saylee Quenneh	Independent	212	8.60
Total		2,464	100.00
Valid votes		2,464	94.73
Invalid/blank votes		137	5.27
Total votes		2,601	100.00

2010 River Gee County's 3rd House District By-election, Round 2
Candidate	Party	Votes	%
Christian Snorteh Chea	Unity Party	1,731	63.99
Philbert G. Toe	Congress for Democratic Change	974	36.01
Total		2,705	100.00
Valid votes		2,705	97.97
Invalid/blank votes		56	2.03
Total votes		2,761	100.00
UP gain from LP			
