= November 2010 San Francisco general election =

The November 2010 San Francisco general elections was held on November 2, 2010, in San Francisco, California. The elections included five seats to the San Francisco Board of Supervisors, a runoff election for a seat on the San Francisco County Superior Court, assessor-recorder, public defender, and fifteen San Francisco ballot measures.

== Superior Court ==
=== Seat 15 ===

As no candidate had more than 50% of the votes in the June 2010 election, a runoff election was held between the two highest vote-getting candidates.

San Francisco County Superior Court Seat 15 election, 2010
Candidate	Votes	%
Richard B. Ulmer, Jr. (incumbent)	99,342	53.17
Michael Nava	87,511	46.83
Valid votes	186,853	67.72%
Invalid or blank votes	89,058	32.28
Total votes	275,911	100.00
Turnout	{{{votes}}}	59.16%

== Assessor-Recorder ==
Incumbent assessor-recorder Phil Ting ran for reelection against James Pan.

San Francisco assessor-recorder election, 2010
Candidate	Votes	%
Phil Ting (incumbent)	175,388	79.68
James Pan	43,961	19.97
Write-in	756	0.34
Valid votes	220,105	79.20%
Invalid or blank votes	57,802	20.80
Total votes	277,907	100.00
Turnout	{{{votes}}}	59.58%

== Public defender ==
Incumbent public defender Jeff Adachi ran for reelection unopposed.

San Francisco public defender election, 2010
Candidate	Votes	%
Jeff Adachi (incumbent)	199,502	98.85
Write-in	2,328	1.15
Valid votes	201,830	72.63%
Invalid or blank votes	76,077	27.37
Total votes	277,907	100.00
Turnout	{{{votes}}}	59.58%

== Propositions ==
Note: "City" refers to the San Francisco municipal government.

=== Proposition AA ===

Proposition AA would increase the annual vehicle registration fee by $10 to fund congestion and pollution mitigation programs.

Proposition AA
Choice	Votes	%
For	156,016	58.77
Against	109,434	41.23
Total	265,450	100.00
Valid votes	265,450	94.10
Invalid/blank votes	16,631	5.90
Total votes	282,081	100.00
Registered voters/turnout		60.48

=== Proposition A ===

Proposition A would authorize the city to issue $46.15 million in bonds for the seismic retrofitting of multi-story wood structures. This measure required a two-thirds majority to pass.

Proposition A
Choice	Votes	%
For	162,266	63.24
Against	94,324	36.76
Required majority		66.67
Total	256,590	100.00
Valid votes	256,590	90.96
Invalid/blank votes	25,491	9.04
Total votes	282,081	100.00
Registered voters/turnout		60.48

=== Proposition B ===

Proposition B would require city employees to contribute additional amounts to their pensions and health benefits, and changed arbitration rules regarding City collective bargaining agreements.

Proposition B
Choice	Votes	%
For	113,894	43.04
Against	150,734	56.96
Total	264,628	100.00
Valid votes	264,628	93.81
Invalid/blank votes	17,453	6.19
Total votes	282,081	100.00
Registered voters/turnout		60.48

=== Proposition C ===

Proposition C would require the Mayor to appear before the Board of Supervisors monthly for formal policy discussions.

Proposition C
Choice	Votes	%
For	154,776	59.89
Against	103,673	40.11
Total	258,449	100.00
Valid votes	258,449	91.62
Invalid/blank votes	23,632	8.38
Total votes	282,081	100.00
Registered voters/turnout		60.48

=== Proposition D ===

Proposition D would allow adult noncitizen parents, guardians, and caregivers with children in the San Francisco Unified School District to vote in San Francisco Board of Education elections.

Proposition D
Choice	Votes	%
For	118,608	45.09
Against	144,418	54.91
Total	263,026	100.00
Valid votes	263,026	93.24
Invalid/blank votes	19,055	6.76
Total votes	282,081	100.00
Registered voters/turnout		60.48

=== Proposition E ===

Proposition E would allow for Election Day voter registration for municipal elections.

Proposition E
Choice	Votes	%
For	118,217	47.21
Against	132,189	52.79
Total	250,406	100.00
Valid votes	250,406	88.77
Invalid/blank votes	31,675	11.23
Total votes	282,081	100.00
Registered voters/turnout		60.48

=== Proposition F ===

Proposition F would shorten, for one time only, the term of one Health Service Board member from five to three years and of another from five to two years, so that terms will expire in pairs and can be filled in the same Board election.

Proposition F
Choice	Votes	%
For	130,415	53.32
Against	114,178	46.68
Total	244,593	100.00
Valid votes	244,593	86.71
Invalid/blank votes	37,488	13.29
Total votes	282,081	100.00
Registered voters/turnout		60.48

=== Proposition G ===

Proposition G would remove the wage formula impacting San Francisco Municipal Railway operators from the City Charter in favor of collective bargaining and binding arbitration, and modify rules regarding binding arbitration and terms of employment for San Francisco Municipal Transportation Agency employees.

Proposition G
Choice	Votes	%
For	164,234	64.94
Against	88,671	35.06
Total	252,905	100.00
Valid votes	252,905	89.66
Invalid/blank votes	29,176	10.34
Total votes	282,081	100.00
Registered voters/turnout		60.48

=== Proposition H ===

Proposition H would prohibit local elected officials from holding a position on a political party county central committee.

Proposition H
Choice	Votes	%
For	103,141	42.56
Against	139,178	57.44
Total	242,319	100.00
Valid votes	242,319	85.90
Invalid/blank votes	39,762	14.10
Total votes	282,081	100.00
Registered voters/turnout		60.48

=== Proposition I ===

Proposition I would allow early voting on the Saturday before the 2011 municipal elections, paid for by individual and group donors, followed by a study of the efficacy of Saturday elections in the future.

Proposition I
Choice	Votes	%
For	150,701	59.29
Against	103,486	40.71
Total	254,187	100.00
Valid votes	254,187	90.11
Invalid/blank votes	27,894	9.89
Total votes	282,081	100.00
Registered voters/turnout		60.48

=== Proposition J ===

Proposition J would impose a temporary 2% increase on the hotel room tax, clarified who is responsible for collecting and remitting third-party taxes, consolidated definitions, and amended the definition of "Permanent Resident."

Proposition J
Choice	Votes	%
For	116,313	45.52
Against	139,206	54.48
Total	255,519	100.00
Valid votes	255,519	90.58
Invalid/blank votes	26,562	9.42
Total votes	282,081	100.00
Registered voters/turnout		60.48

=== Proposition K ===

Proposition K would clarify who is responsible for collecting and remitting third-party taxes, consolidate definitions, and amend the definition of "Permanent Resident." It would override the tax increase portion of Proposition J if both propositions passed and Proposition K received more votes.

Proposition K
Choice	Votes	%
For	95,357	38.53
Against	152,159	61.47
Total	247,516	100.00
Valid votes	247,516	87.75
Invalid/blank votes	34,565	12.25
Total votes	282,081	100.00
Registered voters/turnout		60.48

=== Proposition L ===

Proposition L would prohibit sitting or lying on sidewalks between 7 am and 11 pm with certain exceptions.

Proposition L
Choice	Votes	%
For	142,601	54.30
Against	120,023	45.70
Total	262,624	100.00
Valid votes	262,624	93.10
Invalid/blank votes	19,457	6.90
Total votes	282,081	100.00
Registered voters/turnout		60.48

=== Proposition M ===

Proposition M would establish community policing and foot patrols. It would override Proposition L if both propositions had passed and Proposition M received more votes.

Proposition M
Choice	Votes	%
For	117,608	46.59
Against	134,808	53.41
Total	252,416	100.00
Valid votes	252,416	89.48
Invalid/blank votes	29,665	10.52
Total votes	282,081	100.00
Registered voters/turnout		60.48

=== Proposition N ===

Proposition N would increase the real property transfer tax on certain properties.

Proposition N
Choice	Votes	%
For	149,350	58.49
Against	105,979	41.51
Total	255,329	100.00
Valid votes	255,329	90.52
Invalid/blank votes	26,752	9.48
Total votes	282,081	100.00
Registered voters/turnout		60.48
