= Albert S. Toe =

Liberian politician

Member of the House of Representatives of Liberia
- In office 2006 – April 14, 2010
- Preceded by: Position established
- Succeeded by: Christian S. Chea
- Constituency: River Gee-3

Personal details
- Born: November 27, 1953
- Died: April 14, 2010 (aged 56) Accra, Ghana
- Party: LP

Albert S. Toe (November 27, 1953 – April 14, 2010) was a Liberian soldier and politician.

== Biography ==
Toe was born on November 27, 1953. He was of the Krahn ethnicity.

Toe served in the Armed Forces of Liberia. He rose to the rank of lieutenant colonel. Toe was a member of the People's Redemption Council, which came to power through the 1980 coup d'état which overthrew President William Tolbert. He served as a member of the Interim National Assembly. The final report of the Truth and Reconciliation Commission recommended public sanctions be levied against Toe.

After retiring from the armed forces, Toe became a businessman. He was elected to the House of Representatives of Liberia seat representing River Gee County's 3rd district in the 2005 election. He was a member of the Liberty Party. He died in office on April 14, 2010, at a hospital in Accra, Ghana. He had seven children.
