= Byron Hot Springs =

Thermal spring system in California

- Mead's Hot Salt Springs
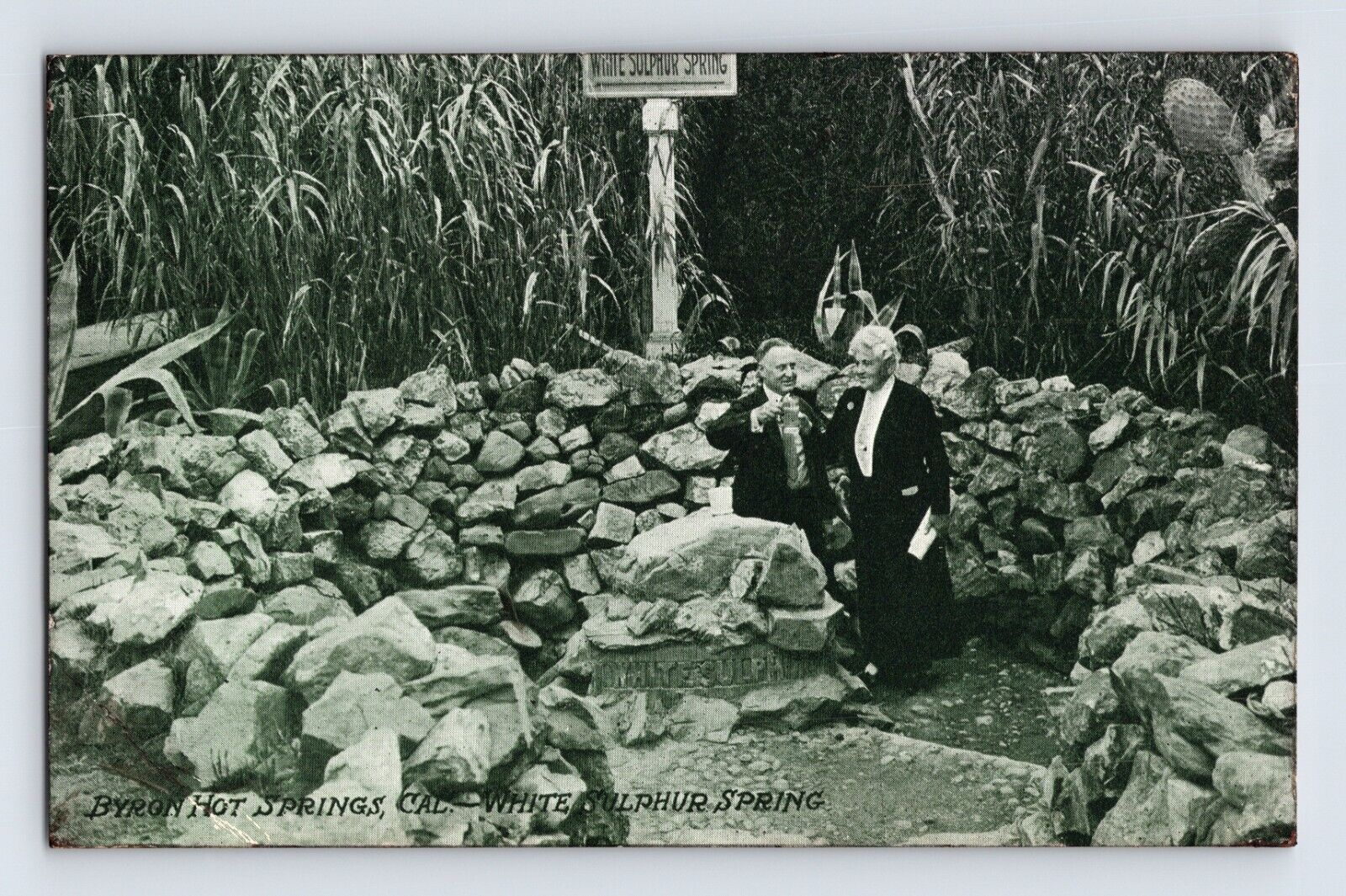
- Postcard of Lewis Mead and a woman thought to be his first wife, at Byron Hot Springs, pre-1905
- Interactive map of Byron Hot Springs
- Location: 1.5 miles (2.4 km) south-southeast of Byron, California
- Coordinates: 37°50′54″N 121°38′00″W
- Type: geothermal
- Temperature: 96 °F (36 °C)

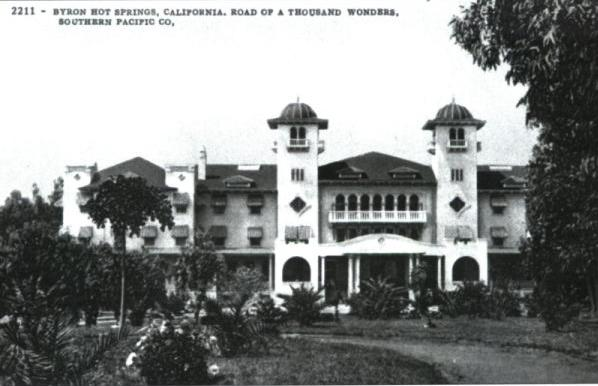
Second Byron Hot Springs Hotel, 1901–1912

Byron Hot Springs is a hot spring system consisting of 57 spring sources, in California, between Mountain House, California and Brentwood, California. It was developed into a historic resort and retreat. During its heyday in the early 1900s the resort attracted movie stars and well-known athletes. It is now abandoned.

== History ==
The Bolbone band of Ohlone Indigenous people used the hot springs for centuries before the arrival of Anglo-European fur trappers in the 18th century. The springs were later used by Spanish settlers, pioneers and Mexican ranchers.

The hot springs were first developed in 1865, 13 years before the establishment of the town of Byron, California. The Southern Pacific Railroad served the Byron Hot Springs depot, with seven stops per day. Around 1878 a 10-page brochure was published advertising the hot springs and their "curative waters" as "preeminently the natural sanitarium of California and the Pacific Coast."

Lewis Mead opened the resort in 1889, as Mead's Hot Salt Springs, and built the first hotel at the site of 57 hot sulfurous salt springs.

The original hotel, built in 1889 on the 160-acre site included a three-story wood building, with a few cottages scattered nearby, as well as a laundry, gas plant and ice plant, all of which were destroyed by fire on July 25, 1901. A second hotel, a three-story stucco Moorish-style structure was constructed in 1901–1902. In 1912, the entire wood-framed property burned to a "mass of ashes", and the final hotel was built from concrete and fireproof brick. The third and final hotel, a four-story brick structure was built in 1913, reopened in 1914.

In 1906, the Byron Hot Springs Hotel was one of a small handful of 5-star hotels in California. An advertisement in the Byron Times from 1913 called the resort "America's unequal spa". A 1911 advertisement in the same newspaper claimed that the mineral water had curative properties, stating that "the water and baths of this spa of the west are a panacea for all ills.”

In the 1920s it was a popular destination for wealthy patrons, celebrities and business tycoons. The hotel grounds were landscaped with palm trees and neatly kept lawns. The resort amenities provided soaks in the mineral water and mudbaths which were claimed to relieve various ailments including neuritis and rheumatism.

Following a series of lawsuits, the resort closed in 1938.

In 1941 the government leased the site and turned it into a military interrogation camp, known as "Camp Tracy" that housed both German and Japanese prisoners of war. In 1945, orders were sent to dismantle it. During its active years of operation, Camp Tracy interrogated over 3,500 Japanese prisoners of war.

In 1947 Byron Hot Springs was purchased by the Greek Orthodox Church for the sale price of $105,000. It served as Monastery Saint Paul for a number of years. The property was then bought and sold several times, serving as a resort, country club, and private residence.

In 1956, the Oakland Tribune reported that plans were in the works for the "famed mecca for tourists and mineral bath devotees" to revive the resort after having been repurposed during WWII by the military and later the Greek Orthodox Church. Dr E. E. Percore, an Alameda-based chiropractor formed a corporation to revitalize the site "in four to six months." At that time the resort property covered 209 acres, and had 53 buildings on site, including a 52-room former hotel. The proposed renovation would restore the hotel, mud baths, indoor and outdoor warm mineral water swimming pools, a nine-hole golf course, and other amenities.

In 2005, a Victorian-style carriage house on the site burned to the ground in a fire. The abandoned hotel was also damaged in the fire, but is still standing. In 2008, a developer announced plans to restore the resort.

== Water profile ==
In 1980 NOAA recorded the temperature of the hot spring water at 96 °F (36 °C). In her book on Byron Hot Springs, writer Carol A. Jensen describes the water as "hot, sulfurous and salty," emerging from the ground at a range of 80-to-100 °F.

In 1889, Dr Winslow Anderson's analysis in his essay, Mineral Springs and Health Resorts of California reported the mineral ingredients of the spring water to contain: Sodium chloride, sodium carbonate, potassium chloride, magnesium chloride, magnesium carbonate, calcium chloride, silica and various trace minerals.

== Gallery ==
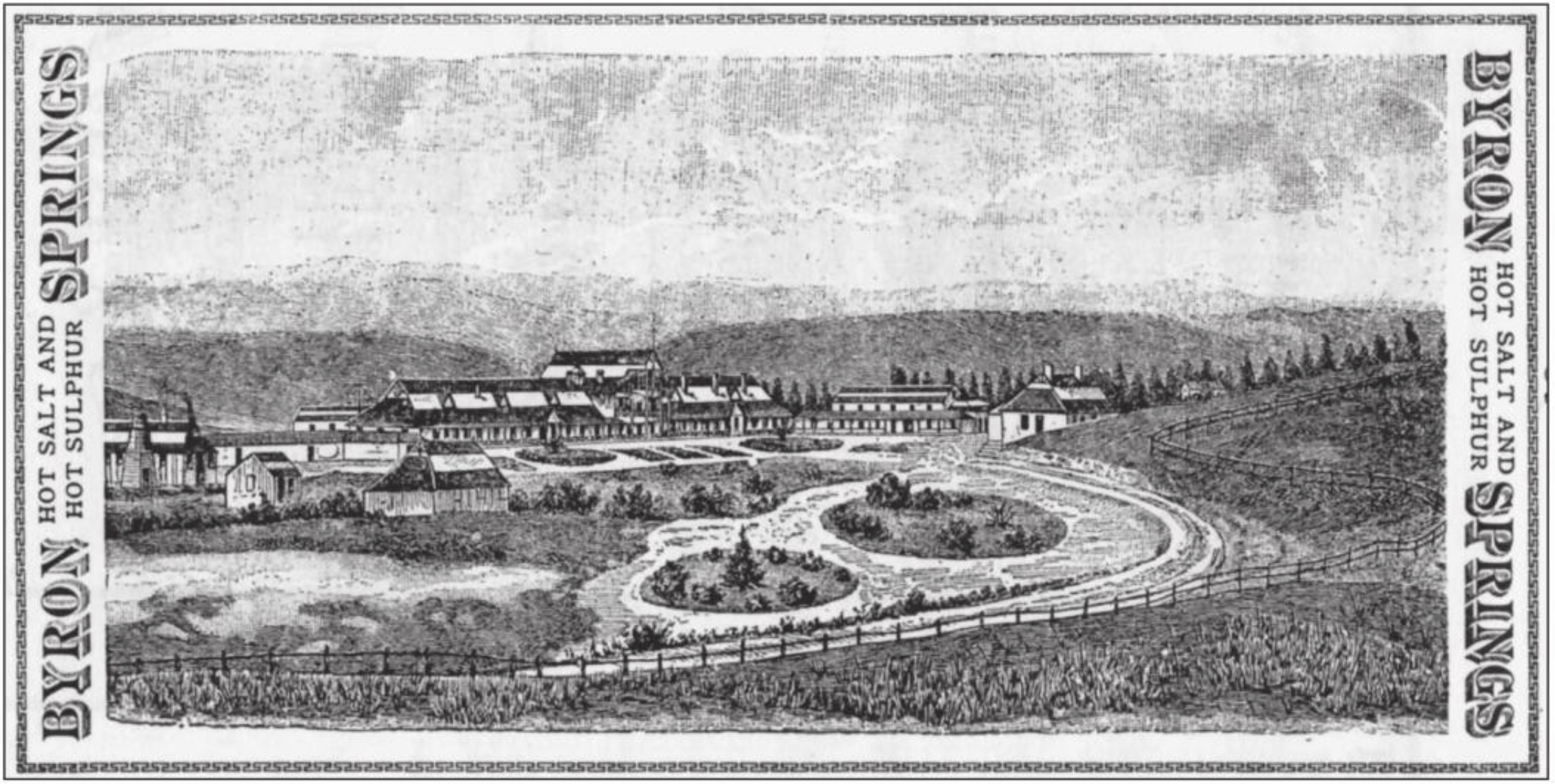
Byron Hot Springs brochure, c. 1878

== Bibliography ==
- Jensen, Carol A. and the East Contra Costa Historical Society. Byron Hot Springs, 2006, Arcadia Publishing ISBN 978-0-7385-4700-8.
