= California's 21st State Assembly district =

American legislative district

Current assemblymember
Diane Papan; D–San Mateo
- Population (2020) • Voting age • Citizen voting age: 493,702; 390,302; 306,315
- Demographics: 36.65% White; 2.10% Black; 27.72% Latino; 26.00% Asian; 0.13% Native American; 1.45% Hawaiian/Pacific Islander; 0.79% other; 5.16% remainder of multiracial
- Registered voters: 270,166
- Registration: 55.75% Democratic; 14.15% Republican; 24.59% No party preference

California's 21st State Assembly district is one of 80 California State Assembly districts. It is currently represented by Democrat Diane Papan of San Mateo.

== District profile ==
The district includes most of San Mateo County, California.

Most of San Mateo County – 64.50%

- Atherton – 2.77%
- Belmont
- Brisbane
- Burlingame
- East Palo Alto
- Foster City
- Hillsborough
- Menlo Park – 19.41%
- Millbrae
- Redwood City
- San Bruno – 95.76%
- San Carlos
- San Mateo
- South San Francisco – 50.20%

== Election results from statewide races ==
Year	Office	Results
2022	Governor	Newsom 74.8 – 25.2%
2022	Senator	Padilla 76.2 – 23.8%
2021	Recall	No 50.1 - 49.9%
2021	Recall	Elder 58.8 - 6.3%
2020	President	Biden 55.3 – 42.3%
2018	Governor	Newsom 54.6 – 45.4%
2018	Senator	De Leon 54.3 – 45.7%
2016	President	Clinton 54.6 – 35.9%
2016	Senator	Harris 51.0 – 49.0%
2014	Governor	Brown 53.6 – 46.4%
2012	President	Obama 55.6 – 42.0%
2012	Senator	Feinstein 57.2 – 42.8%

== List of assembly members representing the district ==
Due to redistricting, the 21st district has been moved around different parts of the state. The current iteration resulted from the 2021 redistricting by the California Citizens Redistricting Commission.

Assembly members	Party	Years served	Counties represented	Notes
C. B. Culver	Republican	January 5, 1885 – January 3, 1887	Yolo	
Levi B. Adams	Democratic	January 3, 1887 – January 5, 1891	Yolo	
Reese Clark	Republican	January 5, 1891 – January 5, 1893	Yolo	
H. C. Chipman	Republican	January 5, 1893 – January 7, 1895	Sacramento	
L. T. Hatfield	Republican	January 7, 1895 – January 4, 1897	Sacramento	
Scott F. Ennis	Republican	January 4, 1897 – January 2, 1899	Sacramento	
William D. Knights	Republican	January 2, 1899 – January 1, 1901	Sacramento	
Louis F. Reeber	Democratic	January 1, 1901 – January 5, 1903	Sacramento	
Stephen H. Olmsted	Republican	January 5, 1903 – January 7, 1907	Marin	
Edward I. Butler	Republican	January 7, 1907 – January 2, 1911	Marin	
George H. Harlan	Republican	January 2, 1911 – January 6, 1913	Marin	
Walter A. McDonald	Republican	January 6, 1913 – January 4, 1915	San Francisco	
Walter A. McDonald	Prohibition	January 4, 1915 – January 8, 1917	San Francisco	
Frederick C. Hawes	Republican	January 8, 1917 – January 5, 1931	San Francisco	
Frank Lee Crist	Republican	January 5, 1931 – January 2, 1933	Santa Clara	
Joseph P. Gilmore	Republican	January 2, 1933 – January 4, 1937	San Francisco	
Joseph Francis Sheehan	Democratic	January 4, 1937 – January 2, 1939	San Francisco	
Joseph P. Gilmore	Republican	January 2, 1939 – January 6, 1941	San Francisco	
John D. Welch	Democratic	January 6, 1941 – January 4, 1943	San Francisco	
Albert C. Wollenberg	Republican	January 4, 1943 – September 19, 1947	San Francisco	Resigned from the California State Assembly.
Vacant		September 19, 1947 – November 24, 1947	San Francisco	
Arthur H. Connolly Jr.	Republican	November 24, 1947 – January 5, 1953	San Francisco	Won special election to fill the vacant seat left by Wollenberg. He was sworn in on November 24, 1947.
Caspar Weinberger	Republican	January 5, 1953 – January 5, 1959	San Francisco	
Milton Marks	Republican	January 5, 1959 – October 25, 1966	San Francisco	
Vacant		October 25, 1966 – January 2, 1967	San Francisco	
Gordon W. Duffy	Republican	January 2, 1967 – November 30, 1974	Kings, Tulare	
Victor Calvo	Democratic	December 2, 1974 – November 30, 1980	San Mateo, Santa Clara	
Byron Sher	Democratic	December 1, 1980 – March 28, 1996	San Mateo, Santa Clara	Resigned from the California State Assembly to take Oath of office in the California State Senate for the 11th district after winning a special election.
Vacant		March 28, 1996 – December 2, 1996	San Mateo, Santa Clara	
Ted Lempert	Democratic	December 2, 1996 – November 30, 2000	San Mateo, Santa Clara	
Joe Simitian	Democratic	December 4, 2000 – November 30, 2004	San Mateo, Santa Clara	
Ira Ruskin	Democratic	December 6, 2004 – November 30, 2010	San Mateo, Santa Clara	
Rich Gordon	Democratic	December 6, 2010 – November 30, 2012	San Mateo, Santa Clara	
Adam Gray	Democratic	December 3, 2012 – November 30, 2022	Merced, Stanislaus	
Diane Papan	Democratic	December 5, 2022 – present	San Mateo	

== Election results (1990–present) ==
=== 2024 ===
2024 California State Assembly 21st district election
Primary election
Party	Candidate	Votes	%
Democratic	Diane Papan (incumbent)	77,204	75.3
Republican	Mark Gilham	25,358	24.7
Total votes		102,562	100.0
General election
Democratic	Diane Papan (incumbent)	147,291	73.8
Republican	Mark Gilham	52,218	26.2
Total votes		199,509	100.0
Democratic hold			

=== 2022 ===
2022 California State Assembly 21st district election
Primary election
Party	Candidate	Votes	%
Democratic	Diane Papan	40,434	41.3
Democratic	Giselle Hale	19,400	19.8
Republican	Mark Gilham	19,078	19.5
Democratic	James H. Coleman	11,269	11.5
Democratic	Alison M. Madden	3,359	3.4
Democratic	Maurice Goodman	2,664	2.7
Green	Tania Solé	1,620	1.7
Total votes		97,824	100.0
General election
Democratic	Diane Papan	94,676	72.4
Democratic	Giselle Hale (withdrawn)	36,014	27.6
Total votes		130,690	100.0
Democratic hold			

=== 2020 ===
2020 California State Assembly 21st district election
Primary election
Party	Candidate	Votes	%
Democratic	Adam Gray (incumbent)	54,987	99.0
Republican	Joel Gutierrez Campos (write-in)	300	0.5
Republican	Guadalupe Salazar (write-in)	256	0.5
Total votes		55,543	100.0
General election
Democratic	Adam Gray (incumbent)	93,816	59.6
Republican	Joel Gutierrez Campos	63,514	40.4
Total votes		157,330	100.0
Democratic hold			

=== 2018 ===
2018 California State Assembly 21st district election
Primary election
Party	Candidate	Votes	%
Democratic	Adam Gray (incumbent)	43,023	99.9
Libertarian	Justin Ryan Quigley (write-in)	49	0.1
Total votes		43,072	100.0
General election
Democratic	Adam Gray (incumbent)	74,320	71.3
Libertarian	Justin Ryan Quigley	29,855	28.7
Total votes		104,175	100.0
Democratic hold			

=== 2016 ===
2016 California State Assembly 21st district election
Primary election
Party	Candidate	Votes	%
Democratic	Adam Gray (incumbent)	43,874	66.8
Republican	Greg Opinski	21,754	33.1
Republican	Brien J. Rahilly (write-in)	36	0.1
Total votes		65,664	100.0
General election
Democratic	Adam Gray (incumbent)	85,990	69.8
Republican	Greg Opinski	37,230	30.2
Total votes		123,220	100.0
Democratic hold			

=== 2014 ===
2014 California State Assembly 21st district election
Primary election
Party	Candidate	Votes	%
Democratic	Adam Gray (incumbent)	26,015	95.3
Republican	Jack Mobley (write-in)	1,286	4.7
Total votes		27,301	100.0
General election
Democratic	Adam Gray (incumbent)	34,931	53.4
Republican	Jack Mobley	30,499	46.6
Total votes		65,430	100.0
Democratic hold			

=== 2012 ===
2012 California State Assembly 21st district election
Primary election
Party	Candidate	Votes	%
Republican	Jack Mobley	20,148	45.4
Democratic	Adam Gray	14,391	32.4
Democratic	Lesa Rasmussen	4,305	9.7
Democratic	Tommy Jones	4,055	9.1
Democratic	Robert R. Sellers	1,452	3.3
Total votes		44,351	100.0
General election
Democratic	Adam Gray	63,349	58.2
Republican	Jack Mobley	45,534	41.8
Total votes		108,883	100.0
Democratic hold			

=== 2010 ===
2010 California State Assembly 21st district election
Party	Candidate	Votes	%
Democratic	Rich Gordon	89,927	60.1
Republican	Greg Conlon	52,809	35.3
Libertarian	Ray M. Bell, Jr.	6,925	4.6
Total votes		149,661	100.0
Democratic hold			

=== 2008 ===
2008 California State Assembly 21st district election
Party	Candidate	Votes	%
Democratic	Ira Ruskin (incumbent)	133,856	70.9
Republican	Annalisa Marie Temple	54,849	29.1
Total votes		188,705	100.0
Democratic hold			

=== 2006 ===
2006 California State Assembly 21st district election
Party	Candidate	Votes	%
Democratic	Ira Ruskin (incumbent)	95,104	67.8
Republican	Virginia Kiraly	45,314	32.2
Total votes		140,418	100.0
Democratic hold			

=== 2004 ===
2004 California State Assembly 21st district election
Party	Candidate	Votes	%
Democratic	Ira Ruskin	98,002	51.5
Republican	Steve Poizner	92,118	48.5
Total votes		190,120	100.0
Democratic hold			

=== 2002 ===
2002 California State Assembly 21st district election
Party	Candidate	Votes	%
Democratic	Joe Simitian (incumbent)	72,104	60.5
Republican	James A. Russell	42,808	36.0
Libertarian	Raymond M. Bell, Jr.	4,286	3.5
Total votes		119,198	100.0
Democratic hold			

=== 2000 ===
2000 California State Assembly 21st district election
Party	Candidate	Votes	%
Democratic	Joe Simitian	82,466	54.9
Republican	Deborah E. G. Wilder	53,140	35.4
Green	Gloria Purcell	14,641	9.7
Total votes		150,247	100.0
Democratic hold			

=== 1998 ===
1998 California State Assembly 21st district election
Party	Candidate	Votes	%
Democratic	Ted Lempert (incumbent)	89,221	70.1
Republican	Laverne F. Atherly	35,053	27.5
Natural Law	Marilyn M. Bryant	3,036	2.4
Total votes		127,310	100.0
Democratic hold			

=== 1996 ===
1996 California State Assembly 21st district election
Party	Candidate	Votes	%
Democratic	Ted Lempert (incumbent)	92,950	60.8
Republican	Theodore A. Laliotis	52,855	34.6
Natural Law	Ron Whitehurst	3,864	2.5
Libertarian	Christopher R. Inama	3,115	2.0
Total votes		152,784	100.0
Democratic hold			

=== 1994 ===
1994 California State Assembly 21st district election
Party	Candidate	Votes	%
Democratic	Byron D. Sher (incumbent)	79,188	62.6
Republican	Bill Mills	47,219	37.4
No party	Ronald Paul Whitehurst (write-in)	3	0.0
Total votes		126,410	100.0
Democratic hold			

=== 1992 ===
1992 California State Assembly 21st district election
Party	Candidate	Votes	%
Democratic	Byron Sher (incumbent)	105,327	63.2
Republican	Janice "Jan" LeFetra	55,497	33.3
Libertarian	Lyn Sapowsky-Smith	5,887	3.5
Total votes		166,711	100.0
Democratic hold			

=== 1990 ===
1990 California State Assembly 21st district election
Party	Candidate	Votes	%
Democratic	Byron Sher (incumbent)	62,719	70.9
Republican	Eric Garris	25,695	29.1
Total votes		88,414	100.0
Democratic hold			

== See also ==
- California State Assembly
- California State Assembly districts
- Districts in California
