= 2010 New Orleans city council election =

The 2010 New Orleans city council elections were held on February 6, 2010, to determine the seven seats of the New Orleans City Council. Runoff elections for districts A and E were held on March 6, 2010.

== February 6 elections ==
=== At-Large Council Spots ===
City Council of New Orleans At-Large election results
Party	Candidate	Votes	%
Democratic	"Arnie" D. Fielkow	51,310	35.05
Democratic	Jacquelyn Brechtel Clarkson	38,904	26.57
Democratic	Cynthia Willard-Lewis	37,362	25.52
Democratic	Nolan Marshall	13,411	9.16
Democratic	Gregory "Chef" Sonnier	3,014	2.06
Independent	William "Poppa" Gant	1,370	0.94
Republican	"Lance" W. von Uhde III	1,031	0.70
Total votes		146,402	100

Turnout: 16.3%

=== District A ===
City Council of New Orleans District A election results
Party	Candidate	Votes	%
Democratic	Susan G. Guidry	10,173	44.22
Republican	John "Jay" Batt	9,046	39.32
Republican	Virginia Blanque	3,324	14.45
Independent	"Fred" Robertson	461	2.00
Total votes		23,004	100

Turnout: 39.4%

=== District B ===
City Council of New Orleans District B election results
Party	Candidate	Votes	%
Democratic	Stacy Head (incumbent)	10,132	66.86
Democratic	Corey Watson	5,021	33.14
Total votes		15,153	100

Turnout: 29.7%

=== District C ===
City Council of New Orleans District C election results
Party	Candidate	Votes	%
Democratic	Kristin Gisleson Palmer	10,508	64.10
Republican	"Tom" Arnold	5,217	31.82
Independent	Nathaniel Jones	668	4.07
Total votes		16,393	100

Turnout: 32.4%

=== District D ===
City Council of New Orleans District D election results
Party	Candidate	Votes	%
Democratic	Cynthia Hedge-Morrell (incumbent)	11,612	76.53
Democratic	Denise Holden	3,562	23.47
Total votes		15,174	100

Turnout: 31.6%

=== District E ===
City Council of New Orleans District E election results
Party	Candidate	Votes	%
Democratic	Austin Badon	5,078	38.85
Democratic	Jon Johnson	3,912	29.93
Democratic	Cyndi Nguyen	1,776	13.59
Democratic	Alicia Plummer	1,065	8.15
Democratic	Jerrelda Drummer-Sanders	805	6.16
Democratic	Leonard Lucas, Jr.	434	3.32
Total votes		13,070	100

Turnout: 28.7%

== March 6 run-off elections ==
=== District A ===
City Council of New Orleans District A election results
Party	Candidate	Votes	%
Democratic	Susan G. Guidry	8,059	62
Republican	John "Jay" Batt	4,869	38
Total votes		12,928	100

Turnout: 20.9%

=== District E ===
City Council of New Orleans District E election results
Party	Candidate	Votes	%
Democratic	Jon Johnson	3,798	53
Democratic	Austin Badon	3,365	47
Total votes		7,163	100

Turnout: 15.2%
