= June 2010 San Francisco general election =

The June 2010 San Francisco general elections were held on June 8, 2010, in San Francisco, California. The elections included seats to various political parties' county central committees, two seats to the San Francisco County Superior Court, and seven ballot measures.

== Superior Court ==
=== Seat 6 ===

San Francisco County Superior Court Seat 6 election, 2010
Candidate	Votes	%
Linda Colfax	59,837	52.73
Harry Dorfman	34,952	30.80
Roderick A. McLeod	10,233	9.02
Robert Retana	7,936	6.99
Write-in	522	0.46
Valid votes	113,480	72.56%
Invalid or blank votes	42,912	27.44
Total votes	156,392	100.00
Turnout	{{{votes}}}	34.91%

=== Seat 15 ===

As no candidate had more than 50% of the votes, a runoff election will be held between the two highest vote-getting candidates in the November 2010 election.

San Francisco County Superior Court Seat 15 election, 2010
Candidate	Votes	%
Michael Nava	50,808	45.87
Richard B. Ulmer, Jr. (incumbent)	47,010	42.44
Daniel Dean	12,285	11.09
Write-in	669	0.60
Valid votes	110,772	70.83%
Invalid or blank votes	45,620	29.17
Total votes	156,392	100.00
Turnout	{{{votes}}}	34.91%

== Propositions ==
Note: "City" refers to the San Francisco municipal government.

=== Proposition A ===

Proposition A would authorize the San Francisco Unified School District to assess a special property tax to pay for maintenance, repair, and seismic retrofitting of public school buildings and child care center buildings. This proposition requires a two-thirds majority to pass.

Proposition A
Choice	Votes	%
For	102,873	70.02
Against	44,043	29.98
Required majority		66.67
Total	146,916	100.00
Valid votes	146,916	93.94
Invalid/blank votes	9,476	6.06
Total votes	156,392	100.00
Registered voters/turnout		34.91

=== Proposition B ===

Proposition B would authorize the city to issue $412.3 million in bonds for the maintenance, repair, and seismic retrofitting of the city's fire hydrant system, fire stations, and police stations, and would fund the construction of a new "Public Safety Building" in the Mission Bay neighborhood. This proposition requires a two-thirds majority to pass.

Proposition B
Choice	Votes	%
For	117,553	79.41
Against	30,484	20.59
Required majority		66.67
Total	148,037	100.00
Valid votes	148,037	94.66
Invalid/blank votes	8,355	5.34
Total votes	156,392	100.00
Registered voters/turnout		34.91

=== Proposition C ===

Proposition C would entrench the city's 11-member Film Commission, previously created by ordinance, into the city charter, with the Mayor appointing six members and the San Francisco Board of Supervisors' Rules Committee appointing five, all subject to approval by the full Board. The composition and duties of the commission would also be entrenched into the city charter.

Proposition C
Choice	Votes	%
For	66,125	46.25
Against	76,834	53.75
Total	142,959	100.00
Valid votes	142,959	91.41
Invalid/blank votes	13,433	8.59
Total votes	156,392	100.00
Registered voters/turnout		34.91

=== Proposition D ===

Proposition D would change the retirement benefits formula for new City employees by increasing their contributions into the San Francisco Employees' Retirement System and require that any savings due to fewer City contributions into the fund be sent to the Retiree Health Care Trust Fund.

Proposition D
Choice	Votes	%
For	112,100	78.77
Against	30,222	21.23
Total	142,322	100.00
Valid votes	142,322	91.00
Invalid/blank votes	14,070	9.00
Total votes	156,392	100.00
Registered voters/turnout		34.91

=== Proposition E ===

Proposition E would require the annual Police Department budget to specify the costs of security for City officials and visiting dignitaries.

Proposition E
Choice	Votes	%
For	80,364	55.82
Against	63,600	44.18
Total	143,964	100.00
Valid votes	143,964	92.05
Invalid/blank votes	12,428	7.95
Total votes	156,392	100.00
Registered voters/turnout		34.91

=== Proposition F ===

Proposition F would amend the rent ordinance to allow a tenant to file, under certain conditions, for a financial hardship application, subject to the final decision of an Administration Law Judge, that may prohibit the landlord from increasing rent on the tenant for a specific amount of time.

Proposition F
Choice	Votes	%
For	62,239	42.25
Against	85,071	57.75
Total	147,310	100.00
Valid votes	147,310	94.19
Invalid/blank votes	9,082	5.81
Total votes	156,392	100.00
Registered voters/turnout		34.91

=== Proposition G ===

Proposition G would make it City policy to have the Transbay Transit Center as the northern terminal of the San Francisco–Los Angeles high-speed rail line.

Proposition G
Choice	Votes	%
For	120,788	83.76
Against	23,421	16.24
Total	144,209	100.00
Valid votes	144,209	92.21
Invalid/blank votes	12,183	7.79
Total votes	156,392	100.00
Registered voters/turnout		34.91
