= 2010 Los Angeles County Board of Supervisors election =

2010 Los Angeles County Board of Supervisors elections

3 of the 5 seats of the Los Angeles County Board of Supervisors
	Majority party	Minority party
Party	Democratic	Republican
Seats before	3	2
Seats won	2	0
Seats after	3	2
Seat change	Steady	Steady

The 2010 Los Angeles County Board of Supervisors elections were held on June 8, 2010, coinciding with the California gubernatorial election, 2010. Two of the five seats (for the First and Third Districts) of the Los Angeles County Board of Supervisors were contested in this election. None of the incumbents were termed out.

== Results ==
=== First District ===
2014 Los Angeles County Board of Supervisors election District 1

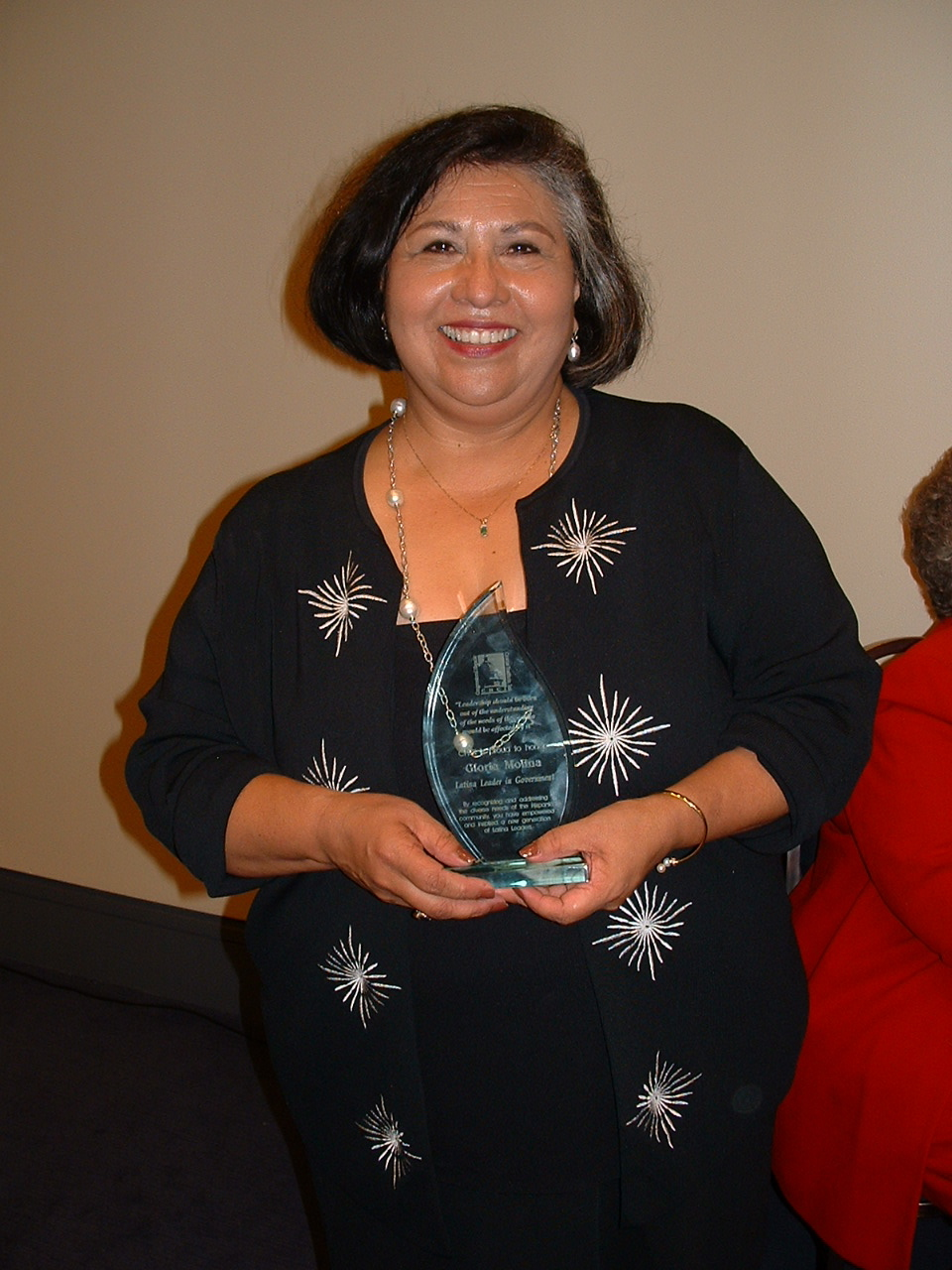
Candidate	Gloria Molina
Popular vote	79,629
Percentage	100.00%
Supervisor before election
Gloria Molina
Supervisor
Gloria Molina

The incumbent, Gloria Molina, ran unopposed.

1st District supervisorial election, 2010
Candidate	Votes	%
Gloria Molina (incumbent)	79,629	100.00
Turnout	{{{votes}}}	11.95%
Total votes	119,913	100.00

=== Third District ===
2014 Los Angeles County Board of Supervisors election District 1

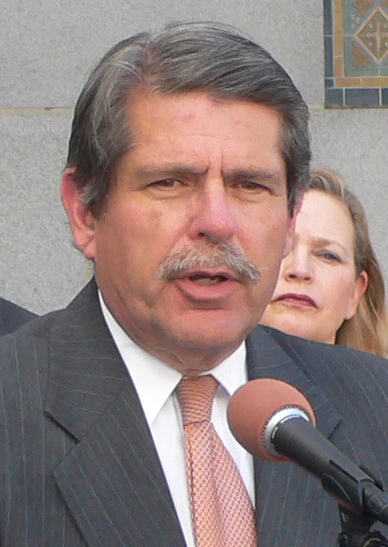
Candidate	Zev Yaroslavsky
Popular vote	149,283
Percentage	100.00%
Supervisor before election
Zev Yaroslavsky
Supervisor
Zev Yaroslavsky

The incumbent, Zev Yaroslavsky, ran unopposed.

3rd District supervisorial election, 201
Candidate	Votes	%
Zev Yaroslavsky (incumbent)	149,283	100.00
Turnout	{{{votes}}}	15.81%
Total votes	185,100	100.00
