= California's 19th State Assembly district =

American legislative district

Current assemblymember
Catherine Stefani; D–San Francisco
- Population (2020) • Voting age • Citizen voting age: 503,871; 430,170; 395,427
- Demographics: 34.86% White; 2.53% Black; 14.59% Latino; 41.76% Asian; 0.11% Native American; 0.36% Hawaiian/Pacific Islander; 0.78% other; 5.02% remainder of multiracial
- Registered voters: 274,281
- Registration: 53.10% Democratic; 8.84% Republican; 34.36% No party preference

California's 19th State Assembly district is one of 80 California State Assembly districts. It is currently represented by Democrat Catherine Stefani of San Francisco.

== District profile ==
The district encompasses the western, more residential parts of San Francisco along with several of its southern suburbs in San Mateo County, making it slightly more friendly towards Republicans than the neighboring 17th District. It also includes the (uninhabited) Farallon Islands. The San Francisco side of the Golden Gate Bridge is located in this district.

San Francisco County – (40.74%)

San Mateo County – (19.25%)

- Colma
- Daly City
- San Bruno – (4.24%)
- South San Francisco – (49.80)%

== Election results from statewide races ==
Year	Office	Results
2022	Governor	Newsom 81.2 – 18.8%
2022	Senator	Padilla 81.6 – 18.4%
2021	Recall	No 81.9 – 18.1%
2020	President	Biden 81.1 – 17.0%
2018	Governor	Newsom 81.4 – 18.6%
2018	Senator	Feinstein 66.0 – 34.0%
2016	President	Clinton 81.3 – 13.3%
2016	Senator	Harris 74.5 – 25.5%
2014	Governor	Brown 83.8 – 16.2%
2012	President	Obama 78.8 – 18.4%
2012	Senator	Feinstein 85.3 – 14.7%

== List of assembly members representing the district ==
Due to redistricting, the 19th district has been moved around different parts of the state. The current iteration resulted from the 2021 redistricting by the California Citizens Redistricting Commission.

Assembly members	Party	Years served	Counties represented	Notes
Charles T. Jones	Republican	January 5, 1885 – January 3, 1887	Sacramento	
Leroy S. Taylor	Republican	January 3, 1887 – January 7, 1889	Sacramento	
Elijah Carson Hart	Republican	January 7, 1889 – January 5, 1891	Sacramento	
Elwood Bruner	Republican	January 5, 1891 – January 2, 1893	Sacramento	
C. D. McCauley	Democratic	January 2, 1893 – January 7, 1895	Solano	
J. M. Bassford	Republican	January 7, 1895 – January 4, 1897	Solano	
Alden Anderson	Republican	January 4, 1897 – January 5, 1903	Solano	
William Walter Greer	Republican	January 5, 1903 – January 2, 1905	Sacramento	
Edward J. Lynch	Republican	January 2, 1905 – January 4, 1909	Sacramento	
William Walter Greer	Republican	January 4, 1909 – January 2, 1911	Sacramento	
Edward J. Lynch	Republican	January 2, 1911 – January 6, 1913	Sacramento	
J. W. Stuckenbruck	Democratic	January 6, 1913 – January 4, 1915	San Joaquin	
George W. Ashley	Republican	January 4, 1915 – January 6, 1919	San Joaquin	
David W. Miller	Democratic	January 6, 1919 – January 3, 1921	San Joaquin	
Bradford S. Crittenden	Republican	January 3, 1921 – January 5, 1931	San Joaquin	
Harry L. Parkman	Republican	January 5, 1931 – January 2, 1933	San Mateo	
Albert Henry Morgan Jr.	Republican	January 2, 1933 – January 7, 1935	Alameda	
Gardiner Johnson	Republican	January 7, 1935 – January 4, 1943	Alameda	
Bernard R. Brady	Democratic	January 4, 1943 – January 5, 1953	San Francisco	
Charlie Meyers	Democratic	January 5, 1953 – January 6, 1969	San Francisco	
Leo T. McCarthy	Democratic	January 6, 1969 – November 30, 1974	San Francisco	
Lou Papan	Democratic	December 2, 1974 – November 30, 1982	San Mateo	
Lou Papan	Democratic	December 6, 1982 – November 30, 1986	San Francisco, San Mateo	
Jackie Speier	Democratic	December 1, 1986 – November 30, 1996	San Francisco, San Mateo	
Lou Papan	Democratic	December 2, 1996 – November 30, 2002	San Mateo	
Gene Mullin	Democratic	December 2, 2002 – November 30, 2008	San Mateo	
Jerry Hill	Democratic	December 1, 2008 – November 30, 2012	San Mateo	
Phil Ting	Democratic	December 3, 2012 – November 30, 2024	San Francisco, San Mateo	
Catherine Stefani	Democratic	December 2, 2024 – present	San Francisco, San Mateo	

== Election results (1990–present) ==
=== 2024 ===
2024 California State Assembly 19th district election
Primary election
Party	Candidate	Votes	%
Democratic	Catherine Stefani	64,973	57.0
Democratic	David Lee	33,047	29.0
Republican	Nadia Flamenco	8,337	7.3
Republican	Arjun Sodhani	7,632	6.7
Total votes		113,989	100.0
General election
Democratic	Catherine Stefani	118,928	60.5
Democratic	David Lee	77,546	39.5
Total votes		196,474	100.0
Democratic hold			

=== 2022 ===
2022 California State Assembly 19th district election
Primary election
Party	Candidate	Votes	%
Democratic	Phil Ting (incumbent)	89,910	80.0
Republican	Karsten Weide	22,509	20.0
Total votes		112,419	100.0
General election
Democratic	Phil Ting (incumbent)	133,316	81.0
Republican	Karsten Weide	31,252	19.0
Total votes		164,568	100.0
Democratic hold			

=== 2020 ===
2020 California State Assembly 19th district election
Primary election
Party	Candidate	Votes	%
Democratic	Phil Ting (incumbent)	111,464	82.0
Republican	John Mcdonnell	24,530	18.0
Total votes		135,994	100.0
General election
Democratic	Phil Ting (incumbent)	175,858	77.6
Republican	John Mcdonnell	50,846	22.4
Total votes		226,704	100.0
Democratic hold			

=== 2018 ===
2018 California State Assembly 19th district election
Primary election
Party	Candidate	Votes	%
Democratic	Phil Ting (incumbent)	86,304	80.5
Republican	Keith Bogdon	16,785	15.7
No party preference	David Ernst	4,084	3.8
Total votes		107,173	100.0
General election
Democratic	Phil Ting (incumbent)	154,705	83.7
Republican	Keith Bogdon	30,049	16.3
Total votes		184,754	100.0
Democratic hold			

=== 2016 ===
2016 California State Assembly 19th district election
Primary election
Party	Candidate	Votes	%
Democratic	Phil Ting (incumbent)	95,046	83.6
Republican	Carlos "Chuck" Taylor	18,666	16.4
Democratic	Daniel C. Kappler (write-in)	22	0.0
Total votes		113,734	100.0
General election
Democratic	Phil Ting (incumbent)	150,052	80.1
Republican	Carlos "Chuck" Taylor	37,180	19.9
Total votes		187,232	100.0
Democratic hold			

=== 2014 ===
2014 California State Assembly 19th district election
Primary election
Party	Candidate	Votes	%
Democratic	Phil Ting (incumbent)	45,103	77.6
Republican	Rene Pineda	12,985	22.4
Total votes		58,088	100.0
General election
Democratic	Phil Ting (incumbent)	81,103	77.0
Republican	Rene Pineda	24,170	23.0
Total votes		105,273	100.0
Democratic hold			

=== 2012 ===
2012 California State Assembly 19th district election
Primary election
Party	Candidate	Votes	%
Democratic	Phil Ting	38,432	56.4
Democratic	Michael Breyer	14,991	22.0
Republican	Matthew Del Carlo	11,646	17.1
Democratic	James Pan	3,075	4.5
Total votes		68,144	100.0
General election
Democratic	Phil Ting	92,858	58.4
Democratic	Michael Breyer	66,200	41.6
Total votes		159,058	100.0
Democratic hold			

=== 2010 ===
2010 California State Assembly 19th district election
Party	Candidate	Votes	%
Democratic	Jerry Hill (incumbent)	90,717	70.8
Republican	Alberto Waisman	33,765	26.4
Libertarian	Gary Tutin	3,674	2.8
Total votes		128,156	100.0
Democratic hold			

=== 2008 ===
2008 California State Assembly 19th district election
Party	Candidate	Votes	%
Democratic	Jerry Hill	124,157	73.0
Republican	Catherine Brinkman	39,132	23.0
Libertarian	Brian Perry	6,803	4.0
Total votes		170,092	100.0
Democratic hold			

=== 2006 ===
2006 California State Assembly 19th district election
Party	Candidate	Votes	%
Democratic	Gene Mullin (incumbent)	88,849	74.2
Republican	Elsie Gufler	30,908	25.8
Total votes		119,757	100.0
Democratic hold			

=== 2004 ===
2004 California State Assembly 19th district election
Party	Candidate	Votes	%
Democratic	Gene Mullin (incumbent)	114,277	71.3
Republican	Catherine Brinkman	41,513	25.9
Libertarian	Miles C. Gilster	4,465	2.8
Total votes		160,255	100.0
Democratic hold			

=== 2002 ===
2002 California State Assembly 19th district election
Party	Candidate	Votes	%
Democratic	Gene Mullin	62,972	62.7
Republican	David Kawas	25,668	25.6
Green	Jo Chamberlain	9,992	9.9
Libertarian	Robert Giedt	1,856	1.8
Total votes		100,488	100.0
Democratic hold			

=== 2000 ===
2000 California State Assembly 19th district election
Party	Candidate	Votes	%
Democratic	Lou Papan (incumbent)	90,675	70.3
Republican	Steven H. Kassel	30,162	23.4
Libertarian	Steve Lundry	4,669	3.6
Reform	Paul J. Six	3,402	2.6
Total votes		128,908	100.0
Democratic hold			

=== 1998 ===
1998 California State Assembly 19th district election
Party	Candidate	Votes	%
Democratic	Lou Papan (incumbent)	75,980	71.3
Republican	Penny Ferguson	26,446	24.8
Libertarian	Steve Marsland	4,203	3.9
Total votes		106,629	100.0
Democratic hold			

=== 1996 ===
1996 California State Assembly 19th district election
Party	Candidate	Votes	%
Democratic	Lou Papan (incumbent)	72,464	55.7
Republican	James "Jim" Tucker	48,715	37.4
Natural Law	Linda Marks	8,923	6.9
Total votes		132,102	100.0
Democratic hold			

=== 1994 ===
1994 California State Assembly 19th district election
Party	Candidate	Votes	%
Democratic	Jackie Speier (incumbent)	100,602	93.1
Peace and Freedom	David Reichard	7,459	6.9
Total votes		108,061	100.0
Democratic hold			

=== 1992 ===
1992 California State Assembly 19th district election
Party	Candidate	Votes	%
Democratic	Jackie Speier (incumbent)	108,428	75.1
Republican	Ellyne Berger	36,020	24.9
Total votes		144,448	100.0
Democratic hold			

=== 1990 ===
1990 California State Assembly 19th district election
Party	Candidate	Votes	%
Democratic	Jackie Speier (incumbent)	53,359	100.0
Total votes		53,359	100.0
Democratic hold			

== See also ==
- California State Assembly
- California State Assembly districts
- Districts in California
