= 2010 Portland, Oregon, City Commission election =

The 2010 Portland City Commission elections were held on May 18, 2010, to elect two positions on the Portland, Oregon City Council.

Incumbents Nick Fish and Dan Saltzman both won reelection to positions 2 and 3 respectively. Both won over 50% of the vote in the primary election, avoiding a runoff.

== Position 2 ==
2010 Portland City Commission election, Position 2
- May 18, 2010
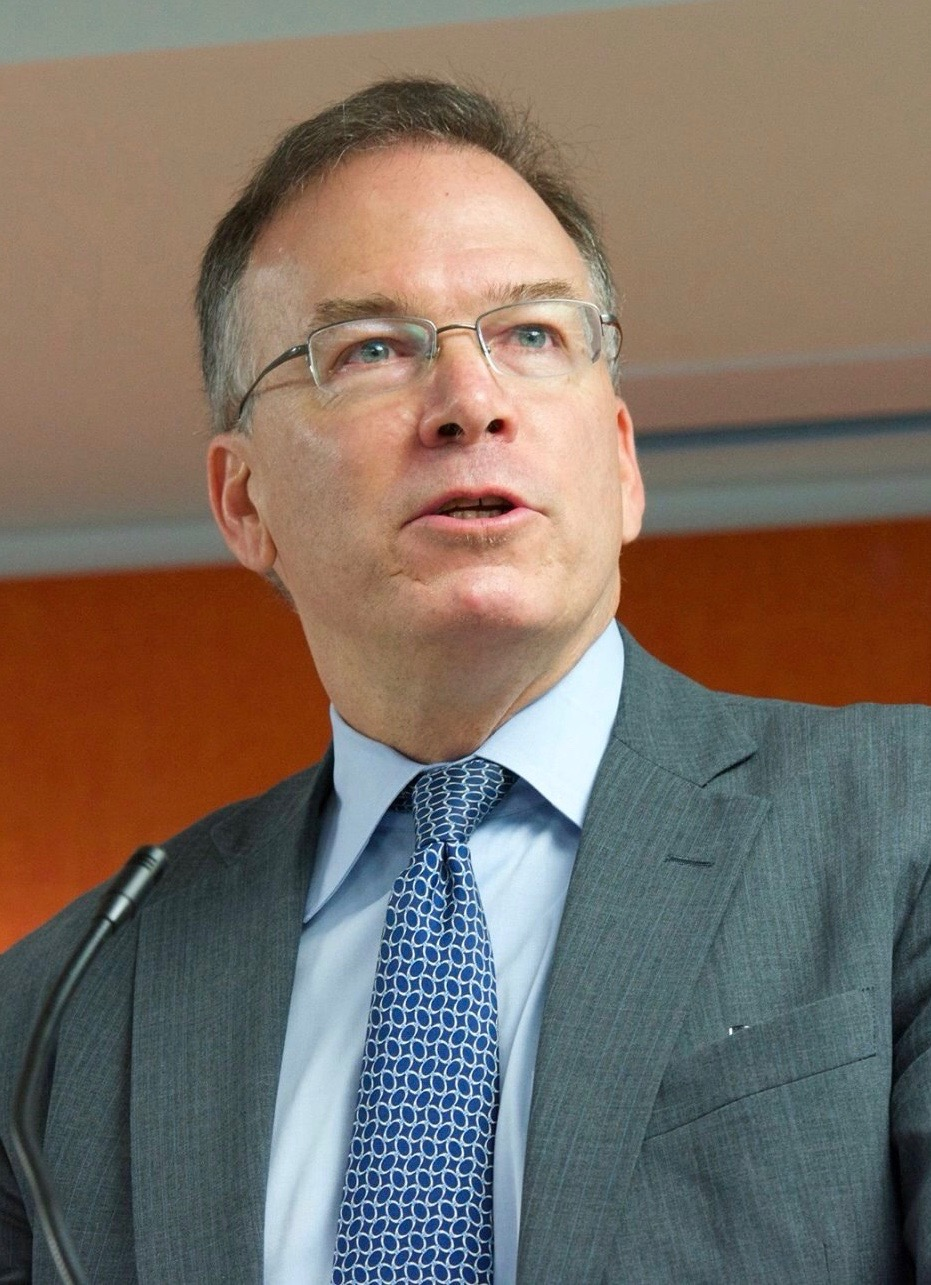

Candidate	Nick Fish	Walt Nichols
Party	Nonpartisan	Nonpartisan
Popular vote	77,511	9,829
Percentage	79.97%	10.14%
City Commission before election
Nick Fish
Nonpartisan
Elected City Commission
Nick Fish
Nonpartisan

Incumbent Nick Fish won 79.97% of the vote, defeating 3 other candidates.

Position 2 election, 2010
Party	Candidate	Votes	%
Nonpartisan	Nick Fish	77,511	79.97%
Nonpartisan	Walt Nichols	9,829	10.14%
Nonpartisan	Jason Barbour	5,884	6.07%
Nonpartisan	Timothy O Youker	3,105	3.20%
Write-in		601	0.62%
Total votes		96,930	100%

== Position 3 ==
2010 Portland City Commission election, Position 3
- May 18, 2010
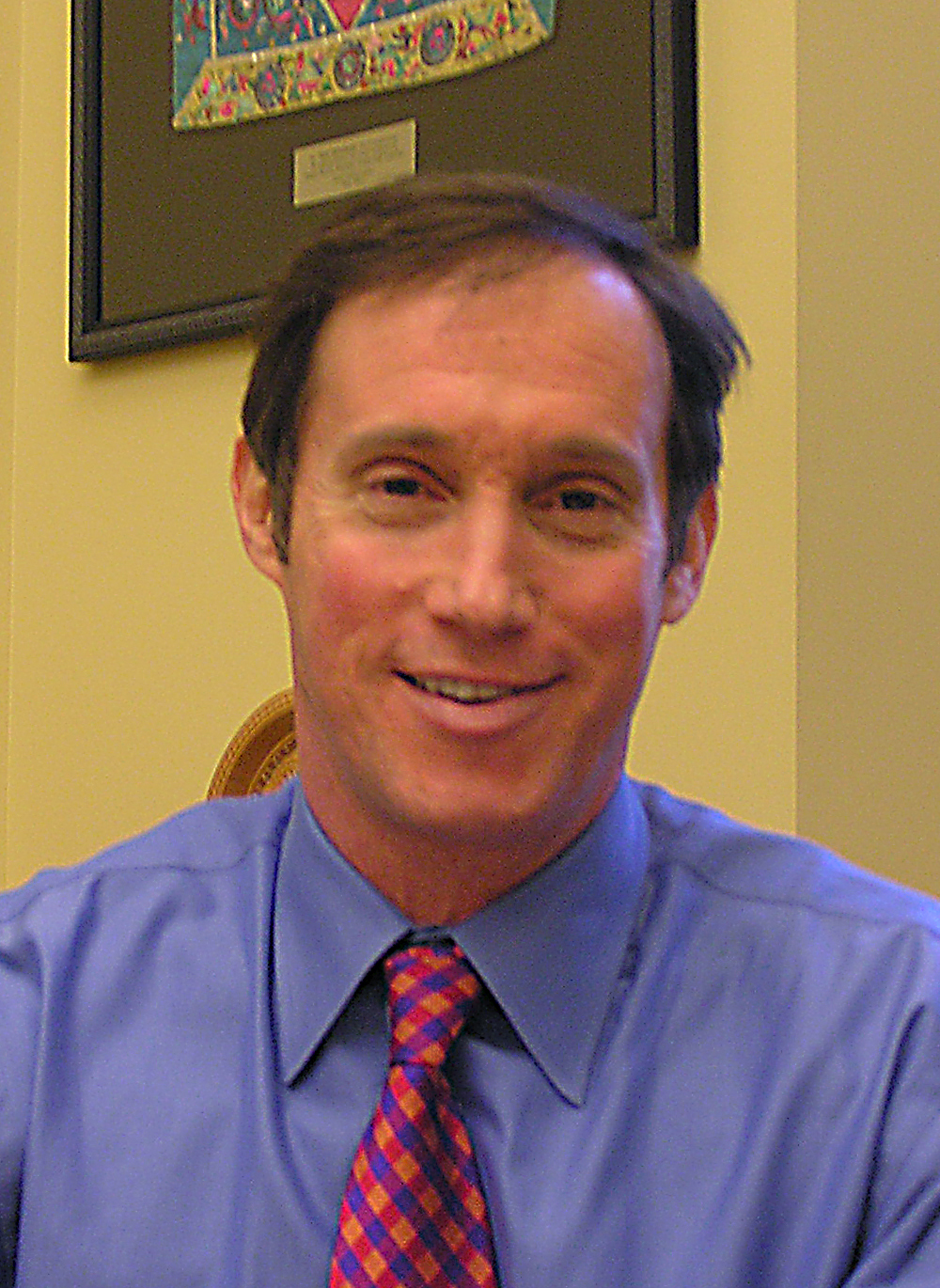

Candidate	Dan Saltzman	Mary Volm
Party	Nonpartisan	Nonpartisan
Popular vote	55,362	11,923
Percentage	55.21%	11.89%
City Commission before election
Dan Saltzman
Nonpartisan
Elected City Commission
Dan Saltzman
Nonpartisan

Incumbent Dan Saltzman won reelection with 55.21% of the vote, defeating 8 other candidates.

Position 2 election, 2010
Party	Candidate	Votes	%
Nonpartisan	Dan Saltzman	55,362	55.21%
Nonpartisan	Mary Volm	11,923	11.89%
Nonpartisan	Jesse Cornett	8,053	8.03%
Nonpartisan	Rudy Soto	7,131	7.11%
Nonpartisan	Spencer Burton	5,768	5.75%
Nonpartisan	Michael J. Courtney	5,482	5.47%
Nonpartisan	Martha Perez	2,990	2.98%%
Nonpartisan	Edward Garren	1,950	1.94%
Nonpartisan	Jason Renaud	1,299	1.30%
Write-in		316	0.32%
Total votes		100,274	100
