= Mohamed Kamal =

Egyptian politician

Mohamed Mostafa Kamal is a Political Science Professor at Cairo University. Mohamed Kamal is both a commentator and analyst of Egyptian, as well as regional, current affairs.

== Education ==
Kamal graduated from the School of Economics and Political Science at Cairo University. His high academic standing guaranteed him a faculty position at the same university.

A year after graduation, he studied at Johns Hopkins University prestigious Bologna Center in Italy, where he earned a diploma in international relations. He moved to Canada, where he received his master's degree in international development from the Norman Paterson School of International Affairs in Ottawa, Canada.

He would return to the United States for his Ph.D. in international relations/political science at the Paul H. Nitze School of Advanced International Studies (SAIS), again at Johns Hopkins University.

He also won a fellowship from the American Political Science Association to work as a Congressional Fellow in the US House of Representatives where he did research for his PhD dissertation on the Role of Congress in making American Foreign Policy towards the Middle East. After finishing his Ph.D. in 2000, he returned to Egypt to resume teaching at Cairo University.

== Current positions ==
In addition to teaching at Cairo University, Kamal has been the Director of the Center for Study of Developing Countries at the University.

As far as his involvement in public service, Kamal held an array of positions in Egypt's political life. He was a member of the Shura Council (the upper House of Egypt's parliament), serving on the Education and Youth Committee.
