= River Gee-3 =

Electoral district in Liberia

- Constituency for the House of Representatives of Liberia
- Electorate: 12,043 (2023)

Current constituency
- Representative: Johnson S. N. Williams Sr.

River Gee-3 is an electoral district for the elections to the House of Representatives of Liberia. It is located in a western portion of River Gee County, bordering Grand Gedeh and Maryland counties as well as the Ivory Coast.

== Elected representatives ==
Year	Representative elected	Party	Notes
2005	Albert S. Toe	LP	Died in office.
2010	Christian S. Chea	UP	
2011	Charles K. Bardyl	UP	
2017	Francis S. Dopoh II	UP	
2023	Johnson S. N. Williams Sr.	CDC	
