= 2010 San Jose, California, mayoral election =

2010 San Jose mayoral election
- June 8, 2010
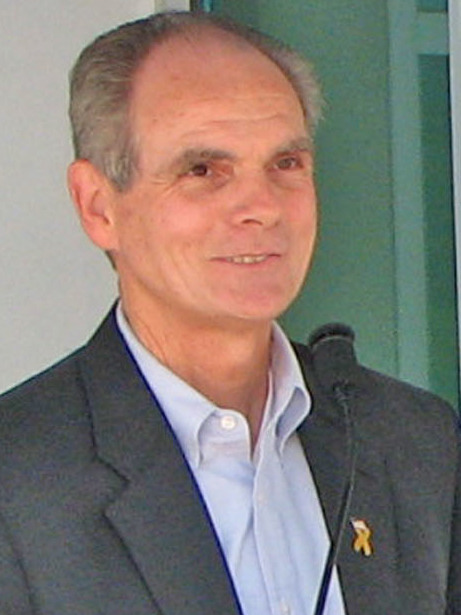

Candidate	Chuck Reed	Thomas Nguyen
Popular vote	103,230	13,349
Percentage	76.85%	9.94%
Candidate	Susan Barragan	Bill Chew
Popular vote	10,671	7,070
Percentage	7.94%	5.26%
Mayor before election
Chuck Reed
Democratic
Elected mayor
Chuck Reed

The 2010 San Jose mayoral election was held on June 8, 2010, to elect the Mayor of San Jose, California. It saw the reelection of Chuck Reed.

Because Reed won an outright majority in the initial round of the election, no runoff election needed to be held.

Municipal elections in California are officially non-partisan.

== Results ==
Results
Candidate	Votes	%
Chuck Reed (incumbent)	103,230	76.85
Thomas Nguyen	13,349	9.94
Susan Barragan	10,671	7.94
Bill Chew	7,070	5.26
Total votes	134,320	100.00
