= Diane Papan =

American politician (born 1963)

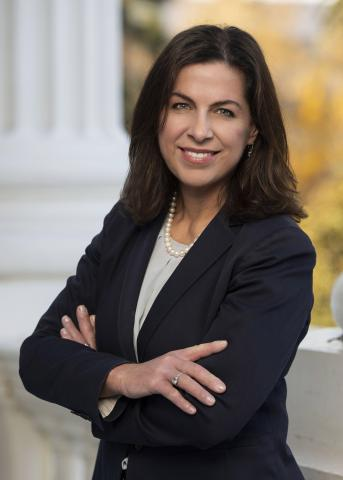

Member of the California State Assembly from the 21st district
- Incumbent
- Assumed office December 5, 2022
- Preceded by: Adam Gray (redistricted)

Personal details
- Born: August 22, 1963 (age 62) Millbrae, California
- Party: Democratic
- Relatives: Lou Papan (father)
- Education: University of California, Los Angeles (BA); University of California, Hastings College of the Law (JD)

Diane Papan (born August 22, 1963) is an American politician who is a Democratic party member of the California State Assembly from the 21st district. Before being elected in 2022, she served as Deputy Mayor of San Mateo.

== Early life and education ==
Papan was born on August 22, 1963, in Millbrae, California, to Greek-American Lou Papan, a longtime member and former Speaker of the State Assembly. She attended Capuchino High School in San Bruno. Papan in 1985 earned a Bachelors of Arts in political theory from the University of California, Los Angeles, and in 1988 earned a Juris Doctor from the University of California, Hastings College of the Law.

== Political career ==
In 2015, Papan announced that she was running for San Mateo City Council, where she won the election defeating incumbent Maureen Freschet. She was elected as Deputy Mayor of San Mateo in 2018. In January 2022, Papan announced her campaign for State Assembly for the newly-redrawn 21st district. In the primary, Papan and Redwood City mayor Giselle Hale both advanced to the general election. In July 2022, Hale announced that she would be withdrawing from the race, citing the smear campaign against her and the impact on her daughters. Because of Hale's withdrawal, Papan ultimately won the general election.

== Electoral history ==
=== San Mateo City Council ===
2015 San Mateo City Council election
| Candidate | Votes | % |
|---|---|---|
| Diane Papan | 9,123 | 37.4 |
| Maureen Freschet | 8,627 | 35.4 |
| Thomas Royal Morgan II | 3,991 | 36.4 |
| Karen Schmidt | 2,660 | 10.9 |
| Total votes | 24,401 | 100.0 |

=== California State Assembly ===
2022 California State Assembly 21st district election
Primary election
| Party | Candidate | Votes | % |
|---|---|---|---|
| Democratic | Diane Papan | 40,434 | 41.3 |
| Democratic | Giselle Hale | 19,400 | 19.8 |
| Republican | Mark Gilham | 19,078 | 19.5 |
| Democratic | James H. Coleman | 11,269 | 11.5 |
| Democratic | Alison M. Madden | 3,359 | 3.4 |
| Democratic | Maurice Goodman | 2,664 | 2.7 |
| Green | Tania Solé | 1,620 | 1.7 |
| Total votes | | 97,824 | 100.0 |
General election
| Democratic | Diane Papan | 94,676 | 72.4 |
| Democratic | Giselle Hale (withdrawn) | 36,014 | 27.6 |
| Total votes | | 130,690 | 100.0 |
| Democratic hold | | | |

2024 California State Assembly 21st district election
Primary election
| Party | Candidate | Votes | % |
|---|---|---|---|
| Democratic | Diane Papan (incumbent) | 77,204 | 75.3 |
| Republican | Mark Gilham | 25,358 | 24.7 |
| Total votes | | 102,562 | 100.0 |
General election
| Democratic | Diane Papan (incumbent) | 147,291 | 73.8 |
| Republican | Mark Gilham | 52,218 | 26.2 |
| Total votes | | 199,509 | 100.0 |
| Democratic hold | | | |
