= Phil Ting =

American politician

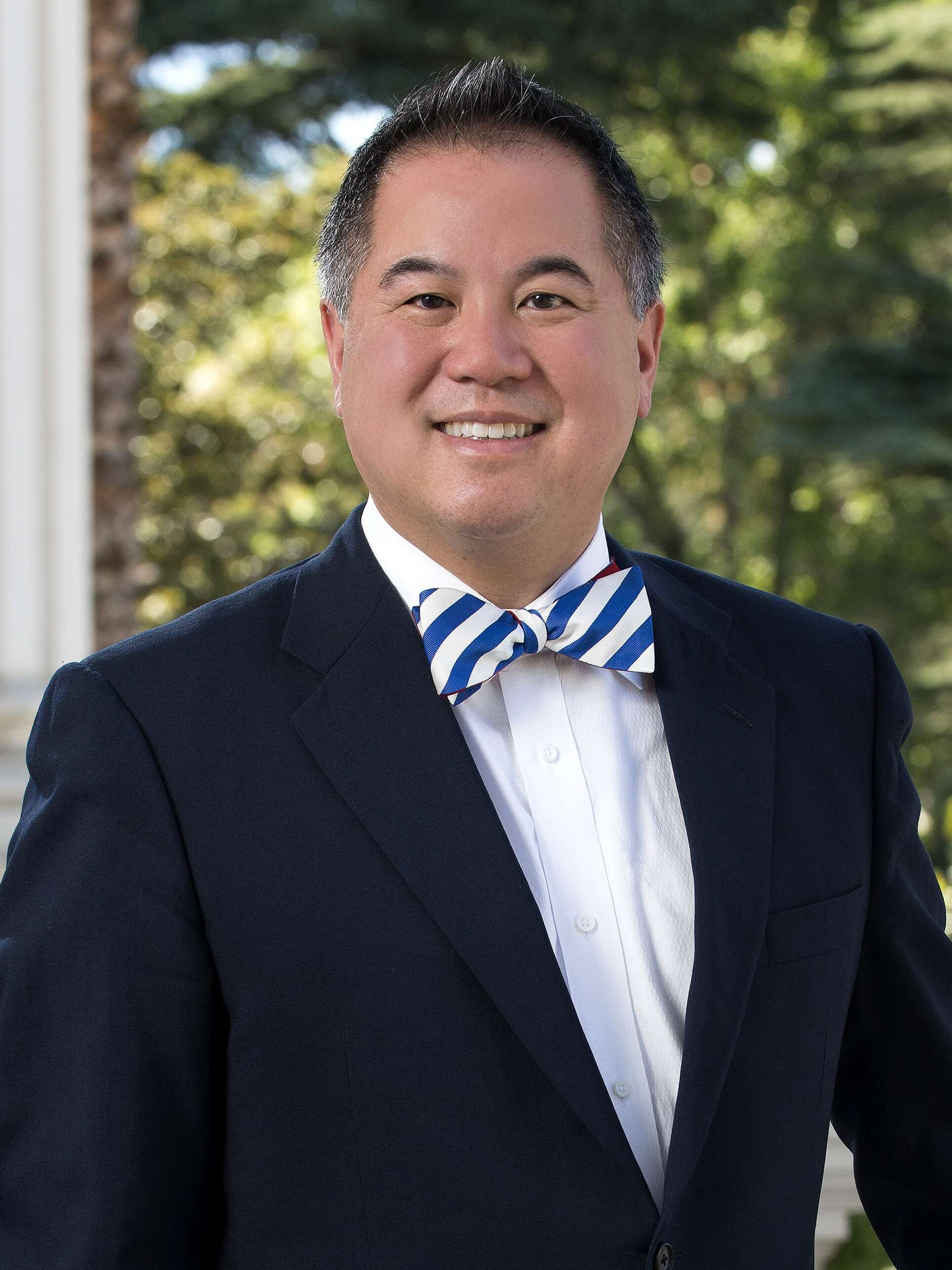

Member of the California State Assembly from the 19th district
- In office December 3, 2012 – November 30, 2024
- Preceded by: Fiona Ma (redistricted)
- Succeeded by: Catherine Stefani

Assessor-Recorder of San Francisco
- In office July 15, 2005 – December 3, 2012
- Preceded by: Mabel Teng
- Succeeded by: Carmen Chu

Personal details
- Born: Philip Yu-Li Ting; February 9, 1969 (age 57) Torrance, California, U.S.
- Party: Democratic
- Spouse: Susan Sun (m. 2003; div. 2024)
- Education: University of California, Berkeley (BA); Harvard Kennedy School (MA)
- Profession: Financial advisor
- Website: a19.asmdc.org

Chinese name
- Chinese: 丁右立
Transcriptions
Standard Mandarin
- Hanyu Pinyin: Dīng Yòulì
- IPA: [tíŋ jôʊlî]
Yue: Cantonese
- Jyutping: Ding1 Jau6 Laap6

Philip Yu-Li Ting (born February 9, 1969) is an American politician who served in the California State Assembly from 2012 to 2024. He is a Democrat who represented the 19th Assembly District, which encompasses western San Francisco and northwestern San Mateo County. Prior to being elected to the Assembly, he was the Assessor-Recorder of San Francisco.

== Career ==
Ting began his career as a real estate financial adviser at Arthur Andersen and CBRE. He also previously served as the executive director of the Asian Law Caucus, as the president of the Bay Area Assessors Association, and on the board of Equality California.

=== Assessor-Recorder ===
In 2005, Ting was appointed San Francisco Assessor-Recorder by Mayor Gavin Newsom, becoming San Francisco’s highest-ranking Chinese-American official at the time. He was then elected to the post in November 2005, garnering 58 percent of the vote.

As Assessor-Recorder, Ting cleared a five-year assessment backlog, which resulted in the collection of more than $200 million in unpaid property taxes. In February 2012, Ting commissioned the country’s first real study of mortgage fraud that spurred national action, uncovering "widespread mortgage industry irregularity" in San Francisco foreclosures.

Specifically, Ting commissioned an audit of nearly 400 homes in the city that had been foreclosed upon in 2009–2011. The results of the audit, which demonstrated that more than 80% of the sampled foreclosures contained at least one clear legal violation, provided documented support for the state legislature to push for increased oversight of the mortgage industry.

Ting was re-elected Assessor-Recorder in 2006 and 2010.

== California State Assembly ==
A Democrat, Ting represents the state's 19th District, which includes the west side of San Francisco, in addition to Broadmoor, Colma, Daly City, and South San Francisco. Ting was chair of the Assembly Committee on Budget and was the first Asian-American to hold the position. He is the chair of Assembly Budget Subcommittee No. 6 on Budget Process, Oversight and Program Evaluation, chair of the Select Committee on Asia/California Trade and Investment Promotion, and is a member of the Committee on Business and Professions, the Committee on Utilities and Energy. He previously served as chair of the Assembly Committee on Revenue and Taxation and Chair of the Assembly Democratic Caucus.

Ting is a member of the California Legislative Progressive Caucus.

=== 2013–2014 session ===
On his first day in office Ting was appointed to the Assembly Leadership, being named the Democratic Caucus chair by Speaker John Perez.

During his first term in the Assembly, Ting authored a law that helped set into motion the transformation of Piers 30–32 into what would become Chase Center the home of the Golden State Warriors. He also helped protect seniors by enabling local governments access to state funds to make pedestrian crossing safer near senior centers.

In 2014 Speaker Toni Atkins appointed Ting to chair the Revenue and Taxation Committee. In 2014, Ting announced his support for a $100 million property tax-break for large corporations in San Francisco's Mid-Market District.

=== 2015–2016 session ===
In 2015 Ting authored legislation that was signed into law which ensured free pedestrian and bicycle crossing of the Golden Gate Bridge, and a created an incentive program to double the amount of food assistance benefits Californians receive if they purchase California grown fresh fruits, nuts, and vegetables.

In 2016 Ting was appointed Chair of the Assembly Budget Committee by Speaker Rendon. Ting’s appointment was historic as he was the first Asian Pacific Islander to chair the Assembly’s Budget Committee.

He also successfully authored a number of new laws including; requiring single occupancy restrooms to be designated as gender neutral restrooms. This received praise and condemnation from around the country as transgender individuals' use of public facilities including restrooms and locker rooms became a partisan issue.

Ting also authored a bill to expand the list of individuals who could petition for a Gun Violence Restraining Order, to help increase their use, however it was vetoed by Governor Brown.

=== 2017-2018 session ===
In 2017 Ting helped secure $10 million in the State Budget to create an additional Homeless Navigation Center in San Francisco.

In 2018 Ting passed legislation to protect minority communities by setting minimum standards for law enforcement hate crime policies, protected renters by requiring landlords to accept payments by third-parties, gave hope to inmates serving long sentences by allowing prosecutors an avenue to recommend the re-sentencing of inmates who have been rehabilitated, increased accountability of law enforcement by requiring public disclosure of body camera footage, and supported California’s transition to EV’s by requiring the California Energy Commission to study EV infrastructure needs.

Ting also reintroduced his bill to expand the list of individuals who could petition for a Gun Violence Restraining Order, however it was again vetoed by Governor Brown.

=== 2019–2020 session ===
In 2019 Ting also took action when the California Redemption Value (CRV) program virtually shuttered around the state, first by securing $5 million in the State Budget to support 400 low-volume recycling centers, and then by creating a mobile recycling pilot program to replace the hundreds of closed redemption sites around the state.

Ting also responded to the Operation Varsity Blues college admissions scandal by authoring a law to require colleges to disclose preferential admissions practices to the State.

In 2020 Ting wrote laws which increased housing across California. One law prevents Homeowner’s Association from prohibiting rentals, while another allows cities and counties to declare “shelter crisis” to suspend regulatory hurdles to building emergency housing and safe parking programs.

He also authored a law directed at creating green jobs in the state, by redirecting state budget funds to help public schools replace HVAC and plumbing, and requiring the California Public Utilities Commission to act on pending electronic vehicle infrastructure applications.

=== 2021–2022 session ===
In 2021, Ting as the Assembly Budget Chair partnered with legislators and the Governor to take early budget action in February designed to help renters/small businesses and send qualified Californians $600 in relief checks to respond to the impacts from the COVID-19 pandemic.

Ting and the AAPI Legislative Caucus successfully got the $166.5 million API Equity Budget included in the state spending plan, bolstering resources and services for victims of hate against Asian American/Pacific Islander communities, while also investing in cultural institutions that promote greater understanding.

Ting was able to get numerous pieces of legislation enacted include banning harmful PFAS chemicals from food packaging and authorizing a pilot program for San Francisco to pay jurors more to see if that resulted in more diverse juries.

In 2022, Ting led the Assembly Budget Committee through another budget surplus, crafting a historic state budget; with the centerpiece of the spending plan was tax rebates to fight inflation. Because of the mass shootings in Buffalo, Uvalde and Highland Park, the Legislature acted early to pass Ting’s AB 1594, which holds the gun industry accountable for the harm their products cause, allowing private citizens, the state Attorney General and local governments to sue firearms manufacturers and retailers when break California’s strict gun laws. Under Ting and Senate Budget Chair Nancy Skinner, lawmakers also took quick action when faced with an enrollment freeze at UC Berkeley, after neighbors sued under CEQA to stop enrollment growth authorized and funded under the state budget. Phil Ting's "Freedom to Walk" bill to decriminalize jaywalking was signed into law by Governor Newsom.

In 2023, Ting spearheaded the effort in the California Senate to pass AB 1633, which prevents use of the California Environmental Quality Act to block new housing developments that already comply with local and state land use and environmental regulations.

== Electoral history ==
=== Mayoral Election ===
Ting ran in the San Francisco Mayoral election of 2011 but was defeated by incumbent Mayor Ed Lee. Ting set a California record for highest campaign expenditures per vote after spending $500,000 on his 2011 campaign for San Francisco Mayor only to finish in 12th place. The majority of the money came from the city's public campaign financing system which provided Ting's campaign with over $300,000.

=== 2012 California State Assembly ===
In 2012, he was elected to the California State Assembly, defeating fellow Democrat Michael Breyer, son of U.S. Supreme Court Justice Stephen Breyer.

California State Assembly election, 2012
Primary election
Party	Candidate	Votes	%
Democratic	Phil Ting	38,432	56.4
Democratic	Michael Breyer	14,991	22.0
Republican	Matthew Del Carlo	11,646	17.1
Democratic	James Pan	3,075	4.5
Total votes		68,144	100.0
General election
Democratic	Phil Ting	92,858	58.4
Democratic	Michael Breyer	66,200	41.6
Total votes		159,058	100.0
Democratic hold			

=== 2014 California State Assembly ===
California's 19th State Assembly district election, 2014
Primary election
Party	Candidate	Votes	%
Democratic	Phil Ting (incumbent)	45,103	77.6
Republican	Rene Pineda	12,985	22.4
Total votes		58,088	100.0
General election
Democratic	Phil Ting (incumbent)	81,103	77.0
Republican	Rene Pineda	24,170	23.0
Total votes		105,273	100.0
Democratic hold			

=== 2016 California State Assembly ===
California's 19th State Assembly district election, 2016
Primary election
Party	Candidate	Votes	%
Democratic	Phil Ting (incumbent)	95,046	83.6
Republican	Carlos "Chuck" Taylor	18,686	16.4
Democratic	Daniel C. Kappler (write-in)	22	0.0
Total votes		113,754	100.0
General election
Democratic	Phil Ting (incumbent)	150,052	80.1
Republican	Carlos "Chuck" Taylor	37,180	19.9
Total votes		187,232	100.0
Democratic hold			

=== 2018 California State Assembly ===
California's 19th State Assembly district election, 2018
Primary election
Party	Candidate	Votes	%
Democratic	Phil Ting (incumbent)	86,304	80.5
Republican	Keith Bogdon	16,785	15.7
No party preference	David Ernst	4,084	3.8
Total votes		107,173	100.0
General election
Democratic	Phil Ting (incumbent)	154,705	83.7
Republican	Keith Bogdon	30,049	16.3
Total votes		184,754	100.0
Democratic hold			

=== 2020 California State Assembly ===
2020 California's 19th State Assembly district election
Primary election
Party	Candidate	Votes	%
Democratic	Phil Ting (incumbent)	111,464	82.0
Republican	John Mcdonnell	24,530	18.0
Total votes		135,994	100.0
General election
Democratic	Phil Ting (incumbent)	175,858	77.6
Republican	John Mcdonnell	50,846	22.4
Total votes		226,704	100.0
Democratic hold			

=== 2022 California State Assembly ===
2022 California's 19th State Assembly district election
Primary election
Party	Candidate	Votes	%
Democratic	Phil Ting (incumbent)	89,910	80.0
Republican	Karsten Weide	22,509	20.0
Total votes		112,419	100.0
General election
Democratic	Phil Ting (incumbent)	133,316	81.0
Republican	Karsten Weide	31,252	19.0
Total votes		164,568	100.0
Democratic hold			

== Personal life ==
Ting lives in San Francisco's Sunset District with his wife and their two daughters. His parents are immigrants from Taiwan.

On June 20, 2020, Ting admitted to having a "years-long" affair with a domestic worker whom he had met through a dating website. The worker had previously testified before the California State Assembly in favor of AB-5, a bill which Ting supported. Ting later released a statement denying that the affair had any influence on his voting record.
