= List of elections in 2010 =

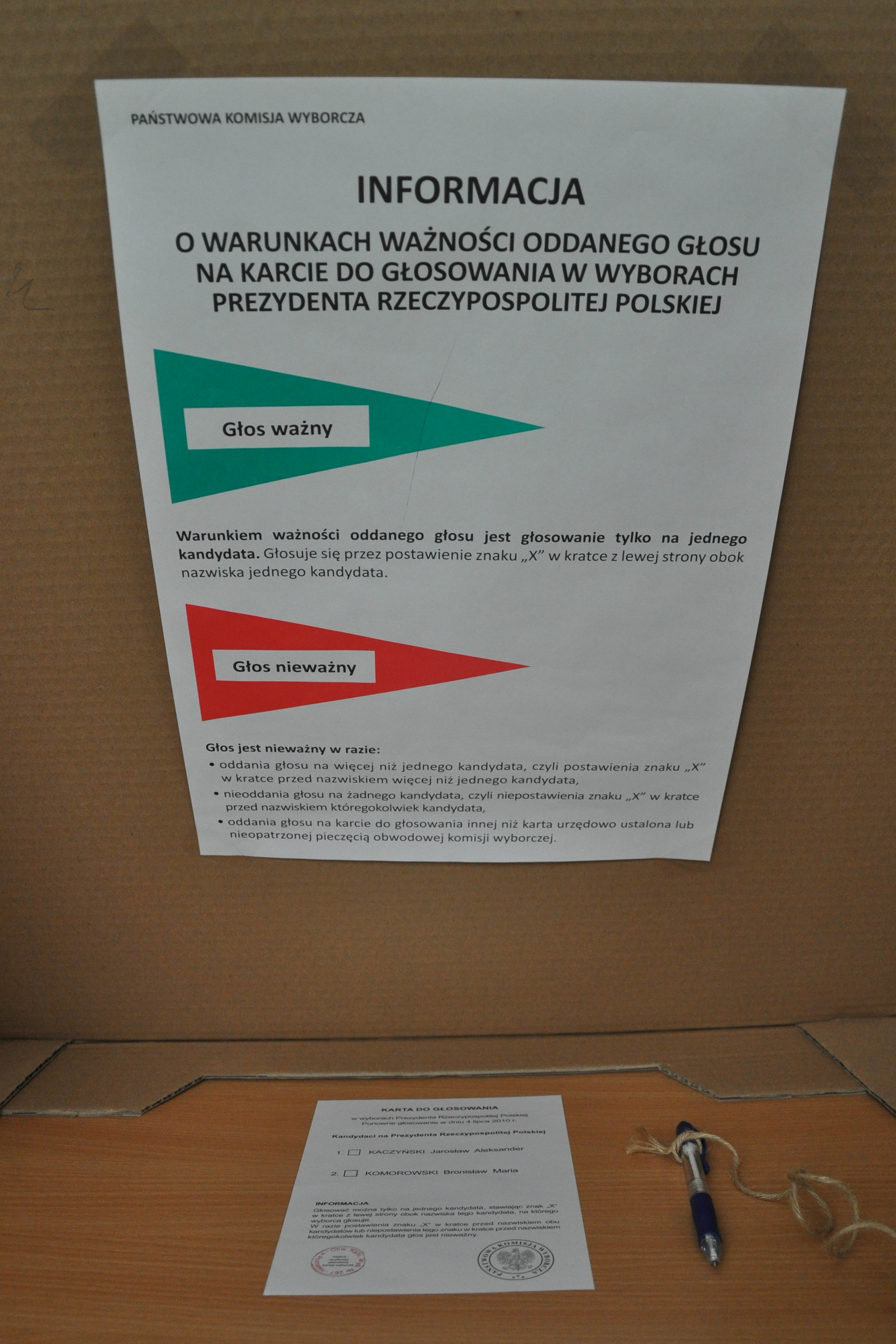
Information and voting card in Polish presidential elections (2. tour), 2010

This is a list of elections that were held in 2010.

- 2010 United Nations Security Council election
- 2010 national electoral calendar
- 2010 local electoral calendar

== Africa ==
- 2010 Burkinabé presidential election
- 2010 Burundian Senate election
- 2010 Burundian legislative election
- 2010 Burundian presidential election
- 2010 Comorian presidential election
- 2010 Darfurian amalgamation referendum
- 2010 Egyptian parliamentary election
- 2010 Egyptian Shura Council election
- 2010 Ethiopian general election
- 2010 Guinean presidential election
- 2010 Ivorian presidential election
- 2010 Kenyan constitutional referendum
- 2010 Liberian by-election
- 2010 Malagasy constitutional referendum
- 2010 Mauritian general election
- 2010 Namibian local and regional elections
- 2010 Nigerien constitutional referendum
- 2010 Rwandan presidential election
- 2010 São Tomé and Príncipe legislative election
- 2010 Somaliland presidential election
- 2010 Sudanese general election
- 2010 Tanzanian general election
- 2010 Togolese presidential election
- 2010 Zanzibari government of national unity referendum

== Asia ==
- 2010 Afghan parliamentary election
- 2010 Azerbaijani parliamentary election
- 2010 Bahraini parliamentary election
- 2010 Burmese general election
- 2010 Egyptian parliamentary election
- 2010 Hong Kong by-election
- 2010 Iraqi parliamentary election
- 2010 Japanese House of Councillors election
- 2010 Kyrgyzstani constitutional referendum
- 2010 Kyrgyzstani parliamentary election
- 2010 Nagorno-Karabakh parliamentary election
- 2010 Republic of China municipal elections
- 2010 South Korean local elections
- 2010 Sri Lankan parliamentary election
- 2010 Sri Lankan presidential election
- 2010 Taiwanese local elections
- 2010 Tajikistani parliamentary election
- Transnational Constituent Assembly of Tamil Eelam election 2010
- 2011 United Arab Emirates parliamentary election
- 2009–2010 Uzbekistani parliamentary election

=== India ===
- 2010 Bihar legislative assembly election
- 2009–10 Tamil Nadu Legislative Assembly by-elections
- 2010 Tripura Tribal Areas Autonomous District Council election

=== Iraq ===
- 2010 Iraqi parliamentary election
- 2010 Iraqi Status of Forces Agreement referendum

=== Japan ===
- June 2010 Democratic Party (Japan, 1998) leadership election
- September 2010 Democratic Party (Japan, 1998) leadership election
- 2010 Japanese House of Councillors election
- 2010 Okinawa gubernatorial election

=== Malaysia ===
- 2010 Batu Sapi by-election
- 2010 Galas by-election
- 2010 Hulu Selangor by-election
- 2010 Sibu by-election

=== Philippines ===
- 2010 Batangas local elections
- 2010 Bohol local elections
- 2010 Bulacan local elections
- 2010 Cavite City local elections
- 2010 Cebu City local elections
- 2010 Laguna local elections
- 2010 Makati local elections
- 2010 Manila local elections
- 2010 Marikina local elections
- 2010 Marilao local elections
- 2010 Marinduque local elections
- 2010 Meycauayan local elections
- 2010 Navotas local elections
- 2010 Philippine general election
- 2010 Philippine barangay and Sangguniang Kabataan elections
- 2010 Quezon City local elections
- 2010 Taguig local elections
- 2010 Valenzuela local elections

==== Philippine general ====
- 2010 Philippine general election
- 2010 Philippine House of Representatives elections in the Autonomous Region in Muslim Mindanao
- Ang Ladlad
- Death and funeral of Corazon Aquino
- 2010 Philippine House of Representatives elections in the Bicol Region
- 2010 Philippine House of Representatives elections in Calabarzon
- 2010 Philippine House of Representatives elections in the Cordillera Administrative Region
- 2010 Philippine House of Representatives elections in Cagayan Valley
- 2010 Philippine House of Representatives elections in Caraga
- 2010 Philippine House of Representatives elections in Central Visayas
- Controversies in the 2010 Philippine general election
- 2010 Philippine House of Representatives elections in the Davao Region
- 2010 Philippine House of Representatives elections in Eastern Visayas
- 2010 Philippine gubernatorial elections
- 2010 Philippine House of Representatives elections
- 2010 Philippine House of Representatives elections in the Ilocos Region
- List of representatives elected in the 2010 Philippine House of Representatives election
- List of senators elected in the 2010 Philippine Senate election
- 2010 Philippine House of Representatives elections in Mimaropa
- Maguindanao massacre
- 2010 Philippine House of Representatives elections in Metro Manila
- 2010 Philippine House of Representatives elections in Northern Mindanao
- Opinion polling for the 2010 Philippine Senate election
- Opinion polling for the 2010 Philippine presidential election
- 2010 Philippine House of Representatives party-list election
- 2010 Philippine House of Representatives elections in Central Luzon
- 2010 Philippine presidential election
- Retiring and term-limited incumbents in the 2010 Philippine House of Representatives election
- 2010 Philippine House of Representatives elections in Soccsksargen
- 2010 Philippine Senate election
- 2010 Philippine House of Representatives elections in Western Visayas
- 2010 Philippine House of Representatives elections in the Zamboanga Peninsula

==== Philippine presidential ====
- 2010 Aquino–Binay Campaign
- 2010 Benigno Aquino III presidential campaign
- Presidential transition of Benigno Aquino III
- 2010 Philippine presidential election

=== Taiwan (Republic of China) ===
- 2010 Republic of China municipal elections

== Europe ==
- 2010 Azerbaijani parliamentary election
- 2010 Belarusian presidential election
- 2010 Belgian general election
- 2010 Bosnia and Herzegovina general election
- 2010 Civic Platform presidential primary
- 2010 Crimean parliamentary election
- 2009–2010 Croatian presidential election
- 2010 Croatian labour law referendum
- 2010 Czech legislative election
- 2010 Czech municipal elections
- 2010 Czech Senate election
- 2010 Dutch municipal elections
- Faroese constitutional referendum
- 2010 Greek local elections
- 2010 Greek presidential election
- 2010 Hungarian parliamentary election
- 2010 Hungarian presidential election
- 2010 Icelandic Constitutional Assembly election
- 2010 Icelandic debt repayment referendum
- 2010 Icelandic municipal elections
- 2010 Italian local elections
- 2010 Ivano-Frankivsk Oblast local election
- 2010 Kosovan parliamentary election
- 2010 Latvian parliamentary election
- 2010 Montenegrin municipal election
- 2010 Nagorno-Karabakh parliamentary election
- 2010 Northern Cyprus presidential election
- 2010 Polish Senate by-elections
- 2010 Polish presidential election
- 2010 Reykjavik City Council election
- 2010 Serbian local elections
- 2010 Slovak political reform referendum
- 2010 Slovak parliamentary election
- 2010 Swedish general election
- 2010 Turkish constitutional referendum
- 2010 Ukrainian local elections
- 2010 Ukrainian presidential election
- 2010 Zakarpattia Oblast local election

=== Austria ===
- 2010 Austrian presidential election
- 2010 Burgenland state election
- 2010 Viennese state election

=== France ===
- 2010 Franche-Comté regional election
- 2010 French regional elections
- 2010 Île-de-France regional election

=== Germany ===
- 2010 North Rhine-Westphalia state election
- 2010 German presidential election

=== Italy ===
- 2010 Apulian regional election
- 2010 Basilicata regional election
- 2010 Calabrian regional election
- 2010 Campania regional election
- 2010 Emilia-Romagna regional election
- 2010 Italian regional elections
- 2010 Lazio regional election
- 2010 Ligurian regional election
- 2010 Lombard regional election
- 2010 Marche regional election
- 2010 Piedmontese regional election
- 2010 Tuscan regional election
- 2010 Umbrian regional election
- 2010 Venetian regional election

=== Moldova ===
- 2010 Moldovan parliamentary election
- 2010 Moldovan constitutional referendum
- 2010 Transnistrian legislative election

=== Netherlands ===
- 2010 Dutch general election

=== Spain ===
- 2010 Catalonian parliamentary election

=== Switzerland ===
- 2010 Swiss Federal Council election
- March 2010 Swiss referendum
- November 2010 Swiss referendums
- September 2010 Swiss referendum

=== United Kingdom ===
- 2010 Labour Party (UK) leadership election
- 2010 Liberal Democrats deputy leadership election
- 2010 Referendum (Scotland) Bill
- 2010 Ulster Unionist Party leadership election
- 2010 United Kingdom general election
- 2010 United Kingdom general election in England
- 2010 United Kingdom general election in Northern Ireland
- 2010 United Kingdom general election in Scotland
- 2010 United Kingdom general election in Wales
- 2010 United Kingdom Independence Party leadership election

==== United Kingdom local ====
- 2010 United Kingdom local elections

===== English local =====
- 2010 Adur Council election
- 2010 Barking and Dagenham Council election
- 2010 Barnet Council election
- 2010 Barnsley Council election
- 2010 Bassetlaw Council election
- 2010 Bexley Council election
- 2010 Birmingham City Council election
- 2010 Bolton Council election
- 2010 Brent Council election
- 2010 Brentwood Council election
- 2010 Bristol City Council elections
- 2010 Bromley Council election
- 2010 Broxbourne Council election
- 2010 Burnley Council election
- 2010 Camden Council election
- 2010 Cheltenham Council election
- 2010 Chorley Council election
- 2010 Craven Council election
- 2010 Croydon Council election
- 2010 Ealing Council election
- 2010 Enfield Council election
- 2010 Fareham Council election
- 2010 Great Yarmouth Council election
- 2010 Greenwich Council election
- 2010 Hackney Council election
- 2010 Hammersmith and Fulham Council election
- 2010 Haringey Council election
- 2010 Harrow Council election
- 2010 Havering Council election
- 2010 Hillingdon Council election
- 2010 Hounslow Council election
- 2010 Huntingdonshire Council election
- 2010 Islington Council election
- 2010 Kensington and Chelsea Council election
- 2010 Kingston upon Thames Council election
- 2010 Lambeth Council election
- 2010 Lewisham Council election
- 2010 Liverpool Council election
- 2010 London local elections
- 2010 Manchester Council election
- 2010 Merton Council election
- 2010 Newham Council election
- 2010 North Tyneside Council election
- 2010 Oxford City Council election
- 2010 Plymouth City Council election
- 2010 Preston Council election
- 2010 Purbeck Council election
- 2010 Redbridge Council election
- 2010 Redditch Council election
- 2010 Richmond upon Thames Council election
- 2010 Rossendale Council election
- 2010 Rushmoor Council election
- 2010 Sheffield Council election
- 2010 Slough Council election
- 2010 Southwark Council election
- 2010 St Albans Council election
- 2010 Stevenage Council election
- 2010 Stockport Council election
- 2010 Sutton Council election
- 2010 Swindon Council election
- 2010 Thurrock Council election
- 2010 Tower Hamlets Council election
- 2010 Trafford Council election
- 2010 Tunbridge Wells Council election
- 2010 Walsall Council election
- 2010 Waltham Forest Council election
- 2010 Wandsworth Council election
- 2010 West Lancashire Council election
- 2010 Westminster Council election
- 2010 Weymouth and Portland Council election
- 2010 Winchester Council election
- 2010 Wirral Council election
- 2010 Wolverhampton Council election

==== United Kingdom general ====
- 2010 United Kingdom general election
- Results breakdown of the 2010 United Kingdom general election
- 2010 United Kingdom general election result in Cornwall
- 2010 United Kingdom general election results in Wales
- 2010 United Kingdom general election result in Glasgow
- 2010 United Kingdom general election result in Surrey
- 2010 United Kingdom general election result in Lancashire
- 2010 United Kingdom general election results in England
- 2010 United Kingdom general election results in Scotland
- Boundary changes for the 2010 United Kingdom general election
- English Democrats Party election results
- List of MPs standing down at the 2010 United Kingdom general election
- List of United Kingdom Parliament constituencies
- List of parties contesting the 2010 United Kingdom general election
- List of MPs elected in the 2010 United Kingdom general election
- Newspaper endorsements in the 2010 United Kingdom general election
- Opinion polling for the 2010 United Kingdom general election
- Parliamentary candidates in Hertfordshire
- Power 2010
- 2010 United Kingdom general election debates

== North America ==
- Costa Rican general election, 2010
- 2010 Costa Rican municipal elections
- 2010 Dominican by-elections
- 2010 Trinidadian local elections

=== Canada ===
- 2010 Canadian electoral calendar
- 2010 Canadian federal by-elections
- 2010 Manitoba municipal elections
- 2010 New Brunswick general election
- 2010 Nova Scotia provincial by-elections
- 2010 Progressive Conservative Party of Prince Edward Island leadership election
- 2010 Quebec provincial by-elections

==== Alberta municipal ====
- 2010 Alberta municipal elections
- 2010 Calgary municipal election
- 2010 Edmonton municipal election
- 2010 Lethbridge municipal election
- 2010 Red Deer municipal election
- 2010 Strathcona County municipal election
- 2010 Wood Buffalo municipal election

==== Ontario municipal ====
- 2010 Ontario municipal elections
- 2010 Algoma District municipal elections
- 2010 Brantford municipal election
- 2010 Bruce County municipal elections
- 2010 Cochrane District municipal elections
- 2010 Dufferin County municipal elections
- 2010 Durham Region municipal elections
- 2010 Elgin County municipal elections
- 2010 Essex County municipal elections
- 2010 Frontenac County municipal elections
- 2010 Greater Sudbury municipal election
- 2010 Grey County municipal elections
- 2010 Guelph municipal election
- 2010 Haliburton County municipal elections
- 2010 Halton Region municipal elections
- 2010 Hamilton, Ontario municipal election
- 2010 Hastings County municipal elections
- 2010 Huron County municipal elections
- 2010 Kenora District municipal elections
- 2010 Lambton County municipal elections
- 2010 Lanark County municipal elections
- 2010 Leeds and Grenville United Counties municipal elections
- 2010 Lennox and Addington County municipal elections
- 2010 Manitoulin District municipal elections
- 2010 Middlesex County municipal elections
- 2010 Muskoka District municipal elections
- 2010 Niagara Region municipal elections
- 2010 Nipissing District municipal elections
- 2010 Norfolk County municipal election
- 2010 Northumberland County municipal elections
- 2010 Ottawa municipal election
- 2010 Oxford County municipal elections
- 2010 Parry Sound District municipal elections
- 2010 Peel Region municipal elections
- 2010 Perth County municipal elections
- 2010 Peterborough County municipal elections
- 2010 Peterborough municipal election
- 2010 Prescott and Russell United Counties municipal elections
- 2010 Rainy River District municipal elections
- 2010 Renfrew County municipal elections
- 2010 Simcoe County municipal elections
- 2010 Stormont, Dundas and Glengarry United Counties municipal elections
- 2010 Sudbury District municipal elections
- 2010 Thunder Bay District municipal elections
- 2010 Timiskaming District municipal elections
- 2010 Toronto mayoral election
- 2010 Toronto municipal election
- 2010 Waterloo Region municipal elections
- 2010 Wellington County municipal elections
- 2010 York Region municipal elections

=== Caribbean ===
- 2010 Anguillan general election
- 2010 Costa Rican general election
- 2010 Curaçao general election
- 2010 Dominican Republic parliamentary election
- 2010 Dominican by-election
- 2010–2011 Haitian general election
- 2010 Martinique status referendum
- 2010 Netherlands Antilles general election
- 2010 Saint Kitts and Nevis general election
- 2010 Saint Vincent and the Grenadines general election
- 2010 Sint Maarten general election
- 2010 Trinidad and Tobago general election
- 2010 Trinidad and Tobago local election
- 2010 United States Virgin Islands gubernatorial election

==== United States Virgin Islands ====
- 2010 United States House of Representatives election in the United States Virgin Islands
- 2010 United States Virgin Islands gubernatorial election
- 2010 United States Virgin Islands general election

=== Mexico ===
- Mexican gubernatorial elections, 2010

=== United States ===
- 2010 United States elections
- 2010 United States state legislative elections
- The Daily Show: Indecision 2010
- 2010 Navajo Nation presidential election

==== United States Senate ====
- 2010 United States Senate elections
- 2010 United States Senate election in Alabama
- 2010 United States Senate election in Alaska
- 2010 United States Senate election in Arizona
- 2010 United States Senate election in Arkansas
- 2010 United States Senate election in California
- 2010 United States Senate election in Colorado
- 2010 United States Senate election in Connecticut
- 2010 United States Senate special election in Delaware
- 2010 United States Senate election in Florida
- 2010 United States Senate election in Georgia
- 2010 United States Senate election in Hawaii
- 2010 United States Senate election in Idaho
- 2010 United States Senate elections in Illinois
- 2010 United States Senate election in Indiana
- 2010 United States Senate election in Iowa
- 2010 United States Senate election in Kansas
- 2010 United States Senate election in Kentucky
- 2010 Linda McMahon U.S. Senate campaign
- 2010 United States Senate election in Louisiana
- 2012 United States Senate election in Maine
- 2010 United States Senate election in Maryland
- 2010 United States Senate special election in Massachusetts
- 2012 United States Senate election in Michigan
- 2012 United States Senate election in Minnesota
- 2010 United States Senate election in Missouri
- 2012 United States Senate election in Montana
- 2010 United States Senate election in Nevada
- 2010 United States Senate election in New Hampshire
- 2010 United States Senate election in New York
- 2010 United States Senate special election in New York
- 2010 United States Senate election in North Carolina
- 2010 United States Senate election in North Dakota
- 2010 United States Senate election in Ohio
- 2010 United States Senate election in Oklahoma
- Opinion polling for the 2010 United States Senate elections
- 2010 United States Senate election in Oregon
- 2010 United States Senate election in Pennsylvania
- 2010 United States Senate Democratic primary election in Pennsylvania
- 2010 United States Senate election in South Carolina
- 2010 United States Senate election in South Dakota
- 2010 United States Senate election in Utah
- 2010 United States Senate election in Vermont
- 2012 United States Senate election in Virginia
- 2010 United States Senate election in Washington
- 2010 United States Senate special election in West Virginia
- 2010 United States Senate election in Wisconsin

==== United States House of Representatives ====
- 2010 United States House of Representatives elections
- 2010 United States House of Representatives elections in Alabama
- 2010 United States House of Representatives election in Alaska
- 2010 United States House of Representatives election in American Samoa
- 2010 United States House of Representatives elections in Arizona
- 2010 United States House of Representatives elections in Arkansas
- 2010 United States House of Representatives elections in California
- 2010 United States House of Representatives elections in Colorado
- 2010 United States House of Representatives elections in Connecticut
- 2010 United States House of Representatives election in Delaware
- 2010 United States House of Representatives election in the District of Columbia
- 2010 United States House of Representatives elections in Florida
- 2010 Florida's 19th congressional district special election
- 2010 United States House of Representatives elections in Georgia
- 2010 Georgia's 9th congressional district special election
- 2010 United States House of Representatives election in Guam
- 2010 United States House of Representatives elections in Hawaii
- 2010 Hawaii's 1st congressional district special election
- 2010 United States House of Representatives elections in Idaho
- 2010 United States House of Representatives elections in Illinois
- 2010 United States House of Representatives elections in Indiana
- 2010 United States House of Representatives elections in Iowa
- 2010 United States House of Representatives elections in Kansas
- 2010 United States House of Representatives elections in Kentucky
- 2010 United States House of Representatives elections in Louisiana
- 2010 United States House of Representatives elections in Maryland
- 2010 United States House of Representatives elections in Massachusetts
- 2010 United States House of Representatives elections in Michigan
- 2010 United States House of Representatives elections in Minnesota
- 2010 United States House of Representatives elections in Mississippi
- 2010 United States House of Representatives elections in Missouri
- 2010 United States House of Representatives election in Montana
- 2010 United States House of Representatives elections in Nevada
- 2010 United States House of Representatives elections in New Hampshire
- 2010 United States House of Representatives elections in New Jersey
- 2010 United States House of Representatives elections in New Mexico
- 2010 United States House of Representatives elections in New York
- 2010 New York's 29th congressional district elections
- 2010 United States House of Representatives elections in North Carolina
- 2010 United States House of Representatives election in the Northern Mariana Islands
- 2010 United States House of Representatives elections in Ohio
- 2010 United States House of Representatives elections in Oklahoma
- Opinion polling for the 2010 United States House of Representatives elections
- 2010 United States House of Representatives elections in Oregon
- 2010 United States House of Representatives elections in Pennsylvania
- 2010 Pennsylvania's 12th congressional district special election
- Pledge to America
- 2010 United States House of Representatives elections in Rhode Island
- 2010 United States House of Representatives elections in South Carolina
- 2010 United States House of Representatives election in South Dakota
- 2010 United States House of Representatives elections in Tennessee
- 2010 United States House of Representatives elections in Utah
- 2010 United States House of Representatives election in the United States Virgin Islands
- 2010 United States House of Representatives elections in Virginia
- 2010 United States House of Representatives elections in Washington
- 2010 United States House of Representatives elections in West Virginia
- 2010 United States House of Representatives elections in Wisconsin
- 2010 United States House of Representatives election in Wyoming

==== United States lieutenant gubernatorial ====
- 2010 Alabama lieutenant gubernatorial election
- 2010 Arkansas lieutenant gubernatorial election
- 2010 California lieutenant gubernatorial election
- 2010 Georgia lieutenant gubernatorial election
- 2010 Idaho lieutenant gubernatorial election
- 2010 Oklahoma lieutenant gubernatorial election
- 2010 Pennsylvania lieutenant gubernatorial election
- 2010 Rhode Island lieutenant gubernatorial election
- 2010 Texas lieutenant gubernatorial election

==== United States gubernatorial ====
- 2010 Alabama gubernatorial election
- 2010 Alaska gubernatorial election
- 2010 Arizona gubernatorial election
- 2010 Arkansas gubernatorial election
- 2010 California gubernatorial election
- 2010 Colorado gubernatorial election
- 2010 Connecticut gubernatorial election
- 2010 Florida gubernatorial election
- 2010 Georgia gubernatorial election
- 2010 Guam gubernatorial election
- 2010 Hawaii gubernatorial election
- 2010 Idaho gubernatorial election
- 2010 Illinois gubernatorial election
- 2010 Iowa gubernatorial election
- 2010 Kansas gubernatorial election
- 2010 Maine gubernatorial election
- 2010 Maryland gubernatorial election
- 2010 Massachusetts gubernatorial election
- 2010 Michigan gubernatorial election
- 2010 Minnesota gubernatorial election
- 2010 Nebraska gubernatorial election
- 2010 Nevada gubernatorial election
- 2010 New Hampshire gubernatorial election
- 2010 New Mexico gubernatorial election
- 2010 New York gubernatorial election
- 2010 Ohio gubernatorial election
- 2010 Oklahoma gubernatorial election
- Opinion polling for the 2010 United States gubernatorial elections
- 2010 Oregon gubernatorial election
- 2010 Pennsylvania gubernatorial election
- 2010 Rhode Island gubernatorial election
- 2010 South Carolina gubernatorial election
- 2010 South Dakota gubernatorial election
- 2010 Tennessee gubernatorial election
- 2010 Texas gubernatorial election
- 2010 United States gubernatorial elections
- 2010 United States Virgin Islands gubernatorial election
- 2010 Utah gubernatorial special election
- 2010 Vermont gubernatorial election
- 2010 Wisconsin gubernatorial election
- 2010 Wyoming gubernatorial election

==== United States mayoral ====
- 2010 Anaheim mayoral election
- 2010 Auburn, Alabama municipal election
- 2009–10 Birmingham, Alabama mayoral special election
- 2010 Honolulu mayoral special election
- 2010 Irvine mayoral election
- 2010 Lexington, Kentucky mayoral election
- 2010 Long Beach, California mayoral election
- 2010 Louisville mayoral election
- 2010 Lubbock mayoral election
- 2010 New Orleans mayoral election
- 2010 Newark mayoral election
- 2010 Oakland mayoral election
- 2010 Providence, Rhode Island mayoral election
- 2010 San Jose, California, mayoral election
- 2010 Shreveport mayoral election
- 2010 Sioux Falls mayoral election
- 2010 Tallahassee mayoral election
- 2010 Washington, D.C., mayoral election

==== Alabama ====
- 2010 Alabama elections
- 2010 Alabama gubernatorial election
- 2010 United States House of Representatives elections in Alabama
- 2010 United States Senate election in Alabama

==== Alaska ====
- 2010 Alaska elections
- 2010 Alaska gubernatorial election
- 2010 United States House of Representatives election in Alaska
- 2010 United States Senate election in Alaska

==== American Samoa ====
- 2010 American Samoan constitutional referendum
- 2010 American Samoan general election
- 2010 United States House of Representatives election in American Samoa

==== Arizona ====
- 2010 Arizona elections
- 2010 Arizona gubernatorial election
- 2010 Arizona Proposition 203
- 2010 United States House of Representatives elections in Arizona
- 2010 Arizona Proposition 100
- 2010 United States Senate election in Arizona

==== Arkansas ====
- 2010 Arkansas elections
- 2010 Arkansas gubernatorial election
- 2010 United States House of Representatives elections in Arkansas
- 2010 United States Senate election in Arkansas

==== California ====
- June 2010 California state elections
- November 2010 California state elections
- 2010 California Attorney General election
- 2010 California gubernatorial election
- 2010 California Insurance Commissioner election
- 2010 California lieutenant gubernatorial election
- 2010 San Francisco Board of Supervisors election
- June 2010 San Francisco general election
- November 2010 San Francisco general election
- 2010 California Secretary of State election
- 2010 California State Assembly election
- 2010 California State Controller election
- 2010 California State Senate election
- 2010 California State Treasurer election
- 2010 United States House of Representatives elections in California
- 2010 United States Senate election in California

==== Colorado ====
- 2010 Colorado elections
- 2010 Colorado gubernatorial election
- 2010 United States House of Representatives elections in Colorado
- 2010 United States Senate election in Colorado

==== Connecticut ====
- 2010 Connecticut attorney general election
- 2010 Connecticut House of Representatives election
- 2010 Connecticut Senate election
- 2010 Connecticut elections
- 2010 Connecticut gubernatorial election
- 2010 United States House of Representatives elections in Connecticut
- 2010 United States Senate election in Connecticut

==== Delaware ====
- 2010 Delaware elections
- 2010 United States House of Representatives election in Delaware
- 2010 United States Senate special election in Delaware

==== Florida ====
- 2010 Florida's 19th congressional district special election
- 2010 Florida elections
- 2010 Florida gubernatorial election
- 2010 United States House of Representatives elections in Florida
- 2010 United States Senate election in Florida

==== Georgia (U.S. state) ====
- 2010 Georgia's 9th congressional district special election
- 2010 Georgia statewide elections
- 2010 Georgia gubernatorial election
- 2010 Georgia state elections
- 2010 United States House of Representatives elections in Georgia
- 2010 United States Senate election in Georgia
- 2010 Georgia General Assembly election

==== Guam ====
- 2010 Guam gubernatorial election
- 2010 Guamanian general election
- 2010 Guamanian legislative election

==== Hawaii ====
- 2010 Hawaii gubernatorial election
- 2010 Hawaii's 1st congressional district special election
- 2010 Honolulu mayoral election
- 2010 United States House of Representatives elections in Hawaii
- 2010 United States Senate election in Hawaii

==== Idaho ====
- 2010 Idaho gubernatorial election
- 2010 United States House of Representatives elections in Idaho
- 2010 United States Senate election in Idaho

==== Illinois ====
- 2010 Illinois gubernatorial election
- 2010 Illinois House of Representatives election
- 2010 Illinois Senate election
- 2010 Illinois elections
- 2010 United States House of Representatives elections in Illinois
- 2010 United States Senate elections in Illinois

==== Indiana ====
- 2010 Indiana elections
- 2010 United States Senate election in Indiana
- 2010 United States House of Representatives elections in Indiana

==== Iowa ====
- 2010 United States House of Representatives elections in Iowa
- 2010 United States Senate election in Iowa
- 2010 Iowa gubernatorial election

==== Kansas ====
- 2010 Kansas gubernatorial election
- 2010 United States House of Representatives elections in Kansas
- 2010 United States Senate election in Kansas

==== Kentucky ====
- 2010 Kentucky elections
- 2010 Louisville mayoral election
- 2010 United States House of Representatives elections in Kentucky
- 2010 United States Senate election in Kentucky

==== Louisiana ====
- 2010 Louisiana state elections
- 2010 New Orleans mayoral election
- 2010 New Orleans city council election
- 2010 United States House of Representatives elections in Louisiana
- 2010 United States Senate election in Louisiana

==== Maine ====
- 2010 Maine elections
- 2010 Maine gubernatorial election
- 2010 United States House of Representatives elections in Maine

==== Maryland ====
- 2010 Maryland Attorney General election
- 2010 Maryland Comptroller election
- 2010 Maryland county executive elections
- 2010 Maryland elections
- 2010 Maryland gubernatorial election
- 2010 United States House of Representatives elections in Maryland
- 2010 United States Senate election in Maryland

==== Massachusetts ====
- 2010 Massachusetts gubernatorial election
- 2010 United States House of Representatives elections in Massachusetts
- 2010 Massachusetts general election
- 2010 United States Senate special election in Massachusetts

==== Michigan ====
- 2010 Michigan gubernatorial election
- 2010 Michigan elections
- 2010 United States House of Representatives elections in Michigan

==== Minnesota ====
- 2010 Minnesota House of Representatives election
- 2010 Minnesota Senate election
- 2010 Minnesota State Auditor election
- 2010 Minnesota Attorney General election
- 2010 Minnesota elections
- 2010 Minnesota gubernatorial election
- 2010 Minnesota Secretary of State election
- 2010 United States House of Representatives elections in Minnesota

==== Mississippi ====
- 2010 United States House of Representatives elections in Mississippi

==== Missouri ====
- 2010 Missouri elections
- 2010 United States House of Representatives elections in Missouri
- 2010 United States Senate election in Missouri

==== Montana ====
- 2010 United States House of Representatives election in Montana
- 2010 Montana elections

==== Nebraska ====
- 2010 Nebraska elections
- 2010 Nebraska gubernatorial election
- 2010 United States House of Representatives elections in Nebraska

==== Nevada ====
- Scott Ashjian
- 2010 Nevada Attorney General election
- 2010 Nevada elections
- 2010 Nevada gubernatorial election
- Tea Party of Nevada
- 2010 United States House of Representatives elections in Nevada
- 2010 United States Senate election in Nevada

==== New Hampshire ====
- 2010 New Hampshire gubernatorial election
- 2010 United States Senate election in New Hampshire
- 2010 United States House of Representatives elections in New Hampshire

==== New Mexico ====
- 2010 New Mexico gubernatorial election
- 2010 United States House of Representatives elections in New Mexico

==== New York ====
- 2010 New York Comptroller election
- 2010 New York state elections
- 2010 New York Attorney General election
- 2010 New York gubernatorial election
- 2010 New York's 29th congressional district elections
- 2010 United States House of Representatives elections in New York
- 2010 United States Senate election in New York
- 2010 United States Senate special election in New York

==== North Carolina ====
- 2010 North Carolina elections
- 2010 North Carolina judicial election
- 2010 United States House of Representatives elections in North Carolina
- 2010 United States Senate election in North Carolina

==== North Dakota ====
- 2010 North Dakota elections
- 2010 United States House of Representatives election in North Dakota
- 2010 United States Senate election in North Dakota

==== Northern Mariana Islands ====
- 2010 United States House of Representatives election in the Northern Mariana Islands

==== Ohio ====
- 2010 Ohio elections
- 2010 Ohio gubernatorial election
- 2010 United States Senate election in Ohio
- 2010 United States House of Representatives elections in Ohio

==== Oklahoma ====
- 2010 Oklahoma gubernatorial election
- 2010 Oklahoma state elections
- 2010 United States House of Representatives elections in Oklahoma
- 2010 United States Senate election in Oklahoma

==== Oregon ====
- 2010 Oregon state elections
- 2010 Oregon legislative election
- 2010 Oregon gubernatorial election
- 2010 United States House of Representatives elections in Oregon
- 2010 United States Senate election in Oregon

==== Pennsylvania ====
- 2010 Pennsylvania gubernatorial election
- 2010 Pennsylvania lieutenant gubernatorial election
- 2010 Pennsylvania House of Representatives election
- 2010 Pennsylvania Senate elections
- 2010 Pennsylvania elections
- 2010 Pennsylvania's 12th congressional district special election
- 2010 United States Senate election in Pennsylvania
- 2010 United States Senate Democratic primary election in Pennsylvania
- 2010 United States House of Representatives elections in Pennsylvania

==== Rhode Island ====
- 2010 Rhode Island gubernatorial election

==== South Carolina ====
- 2010 South Carolina gubernatorial election
- 2010 South Carolina elections
- 2010 United States House of Representatives elections in South Carolina
- 2010 United States Senate election in South Carolina

==== South Dakota ====
- 2010 South Dakota gubernatorial election
- 2010 United States House of Representatives election in South Dakota
- 2010 South Dakota elections
- 2010 United States Senate election in South Dakota

==== Tennessee ====
- 2010 Tennessee gubernatorial election
- 2010 United States House of Representatives elections in Tennessee

==== Texas ====
- 2010 Texas gubernatorial election
- 2010 Texas elections
- 2010 United States House of Representatives elections in Texas

==== United States Virgin Islands ====
- 2010 United States House of Representatives election in the United States Virgin Islands
- 2010 United States Virgin Islands gubernatorial election
- 2010 United States Virgin Islands general election

==== Utah ====
- 2010 Utah gubernatorial election
- 2010 United States House of Representatives elections in Utah
- 2010 United States Senate election in Utah

==== Vermont ====
- 2010 Vermont gubernatorial election
- 2010 United States House of Representatives election in Vermont
- 2010 United States Senate election in Vermont

==== Virginia ====
- 2010 United States House of Representatives elections in Virginia
- 2010 Virginia elections
- 2010 Virginia's 11th congressional district election
- 2010 Virginia's 5th congressional district election
- 2010 Virginia's 8th congressional district election

==== Washington (U.S. state) ====
- 2010 Washington elections
- 2010 United States House of Representatives elections in Washington
- 2010 United States Senate election in Washington
- 2010 Washington House of Representatives election
- 2010 Washington's 21st Legislative District, House 2 election

==== Washington, D.C. ====
- 2010 United States House of Representatives election in the District of Columbia
- 2010 Washington, D.C. mayoral election

==== West Virginia ====
- 2010 United States Senate special election in West Virginia
- 2010 United States House of Representatives elections in West Virginia
- 2010 West Virginia elections

==== Wisconsin ====
- 2010 United States House of Representatives elections in Wisconsin
- 2010 United States Senate election in Wisconsin
- 2010 Wisconsin state elections
- 2010 Wisconsin elections
- 2010 Wisconsin gubernatorial election

==== Wyoming ====
- 2010 Wyoming gubernatorial election
- 2010 United States House of Representatives election in Wyoming

== Oceania ==
- 2010 Bougainvillean general election
- 2010 Bougainvillean presidential election
- 2010 Cook Islands general election
- 2010 Cook Islands Member of Parliament reduction referendum
- 2010 Faleata West by-election
- 2010 Nauruan constitutional referendum
- April 2010 Nauruan parliamentary election
- June 2010 Nauruan parliamentary election
- 2010 Nauruan presidential election
- 2010 Safata by-election
- 2010 Solomon Islands general election
- 2010 Tongan general election
- 2010 Tuvaluan general election
- 2010 Vaisigano by-election

=== American Samoa ===
- 2010 American Samoan constitutional referendum
- 2010 American Samoan general election
- 2010 United States House of Representatives election in American Samoa

=== Australia ===
- 2010 Altona state by-election
- 2010 Araluen by-election
- 2010 Armadale state by-election
- Australian 2010 election upper house results
- 2010 Australian federal election
- 2010 Australian Labor Party leadership election
- Full national and state-by-state lower house results and maps for the 2010 Australian federal election
- Opinion polling for the 2010 Australian federal election
- 2010 Penrith state by-election
- 2010 South Australian state election
- 2010 Tasmanian state election
- 2010 Victorian state election

=== Guam ===
- 2010 Guam gubernatorial election
- 2010 Guamanian general election
- 2010 Guamanian legislative election

=== Hawaii ===
- 2010 Hawaii gubernatorial election
- 2010 Hawaii's 1st congressional district special election
- 2010 Honolulu mayoral election
- 2010 United States House of Representatives elections in Hawaii
- 2010 United States Senate election in Hawaii

=== New Zealand ===
- 2010 New Zealand local elections
- 2010 Auckland local elections
- 2010 Auckland mayoral election
- 2010 Christchurch mayoral election
- 2010 Dunedin mayoral election
- 2010 Dunedin local elections
- 2010 Invercargill mayoral election
- 2010 Mana by-election
- 2010 Wellington City mayoral election
- 2010 Wellington local elections

=== Northern Mariana Islands ===
- 2010 United States House of Representatives election in the Northern Mariana Islands

== South America ==
- 2011 Bolivian judicial election
- 2010 Bolivian regional election
- 2010 Colombian legislative election
- 2010 Colombian presidential election
- 2010 French Guiana status referendum
- 2010 Surinamese legislative election
- 2010 Surinamese presidential election
- 2010 Uruguayan municipal elections
- 2010 Venezuelan parliamentary election

=== Brazil ===
- 2010 Brazilian general election
- 2010 Bahia gubernatorial election
- Brazil can do more
- 2010 Brazilian presidential election
- 2010 Brazilian gubernatorial elections
- 2010 Brazilian parliamentary election
- 2010 Brazilian presidential election debates
- For Brazil to keep on changing
- 2010 Goiás gubernatorial election
- Opinion polling for the 2010 Brazilian presidential election

== See also ==
- Category:2010 elections
