= 2010 West Lancashire Borough Council election =

2010 UK local government election

Results of the 2010 West Lancashire Borough Council election

The 2010 West Lancashire Borough Council election took place on 6 May 2010 to elect members of West Lancashire Borough Council in Lancashire, England. One third of the council was up for election and the Conservative Party stayed in overall control of the council.

After the election, the composition of the council was:

- Conservative 31
- Labour 21
- Independent 1
- Vacant 1

== Background ==
Since the council was created in 1973 West Lancashire has alternated between the Conservative and Labour parties. The Conservatives gained control of the council in the 2002 election and since then had increased their majority. This meant that before the 2010 election the Conservatives held 33 of the 54 seats on the council as compared to 16 for Labour, 2 independents and a number of vacancies. The third party nationally, the Liberal Democrats, had no councillors in West Lancashire and did not stand any candidates in the election.

== Campaign ==
19 seats were being contested in the 2010 election, including the normal 18 seats and one by-election. The by-election in Scott ward came after the resignation of Conservative Geoff Hammond in March, meaning that 2 councillors would be elected from the ward in 2010. As well as the Conservative and Labour parties, there were also several Green Party candidates and one English Democrat who was standing in Ashurst ward.

The Conservatives' strong majority before the election meant it was seen as being almost certain that they would remain in control of the council. They were defending 14 of the 19 seats being contested, but were still hoping to make some gains. The Conservatives pointed to their record in freezing Council Tax, while making improvements in services and local parks.

Meanwhile, Labour pointed to their candidates and the increased turnout due to the election taking place at the same time as the general election, as factors leading them to hope they would make gains. They targeted the wards of Burscough East, Burscough West and Scott, while also hoping to make progress elsewhere in the north of the council.

== Election result ==
The results saw the Conservatives stay in control of the council despite losing 3 council seats to reduce their majority to 8 seats. Labour gained the 3 seats from the Conservatives in Burscough West and both seats in Scott ward, with Labour's 41 vote majority in Burscough West being the most marginal of the election. Labour also regained a seat in Up Holland, where the former councillor, David Phythian, had served as an independent after having been suspended from Labour in 2007 due to racist comments. However the Conservative group leader, Ian Grant, was among those who held their seats with the Conservatives remaining safely in control of the council.

West Lancashire local election result 2010
Party	Seats	Gains	Losses	Net gain/loss	Seats %	Votes %	Votes	+/−
Conservative	11	0	3	-3	57.9	47.5	22,328	-6.7
Labour	8	4	0	+4	42.1	48.8	22,930	+12.0
Green	0	0	0	0	0.0	3.0	1,402	-0.1
English Democrat	0	0	0	0	0.0	0.8	353	+0.8
Independent	0	0	1	-1	0.0	0.0	0	-

== Ward results ==
Ashurst
Party	Candidate	Votes	%	±%
Labour	Yvonne Gagen	2,109	69.5	+18.3
Conservative	David Gallagher	574	18.9	−10.1
English Democrat	Stephen Bennett	353	11.6	+11.6
Majority		1,535	50.6	+28.4
Turnout		3,036	63.1	+41.6
Labour hold		Swing		

Aughton & Downholland
Party	Candidate	Votes	%	±%
Conservative	David O'Toole	1,871	57.7	−7.3
Labour	Paul Hennessy	1,372	42.3	+24.0
Majority		499	15.4	−31.3
Turnout		3,243	72.5	+35.8
Conservative hold		Swing		

Aughton Park
Party	Candidate	Votes	%	±%
Conservative	Ian Grant	1,511	68.7	−12.1
Labour	Kate Ainscough	688	31.3	+12.1
Majority		823	37.4	−24.2
Turnout		2,199	70.6	+35.2
Conservative hold		Swing		

Burscough East
Party	Candidate	Votes	%	±%
Conservative	Ruth Melling	1,192	53.1	−12.5
Labour	Roger Bell	1,054	46.9	+12.5
Majority		138	6.1	−25.2
Turnout		2,246	68.5	+33.9
Conservative hold		Swing		

Burscough West
Party	Candidate	Votes	%	±%
Labour	John Davis	1,307	50.8	+9.4
Conservative	David Griffiths	1,266	49.2	−9.4
Majority		41	1.6	
Turnout		2,573	66.3	+29.3
Labour gain from Conservative		Swing		

Derby
Party	Candidate	Votes	%	±%
Conservative	Paul Greenall	1,396	46.0	−15.8
Labour	John Fillis	1,195	39.4	+16.4
Green	Anne Doyle	445	14.7	−0.5
Majority		201	6.6	−32.2
Turnout		3,036	58.2	+29.1
Conservative hold		Swing		

Hesketh-with-Becconsall
Party	Candidate	Votes	%	±%
Conservative	Christopher Ashcroft	1,339	68.6	
Labour	Lucy Hodson	612	31.4	
Majority		727	37.2	
Turnout		1,951	62.7	
Conservative hold		Swing		

Knowsley
Party	Candidate	Votes	%	±%
Conservative	Val Hopley	1,535	48.6	−15.2
Labour	Judith Hanlon	1,331	42.1	+19.4
Green	John Watt	292	9.2	−4.2
Majority		204	6.5	−34.6
Turnout		3,158	72.1	+36.7
Conservative hold		Swing		

Moorside
Party	Candidate	Votes	%	±%
Labour	Julie Gibson	1,298	83.4	+8.9
Conservative	Graham Jones	259	16.6	−8.9
Majority		1,039	66.7	+17.8
Turnout		1,557	56.9	+34.2
Labour hold		Swing		

Newburgh
Party	Candidate	Votes	%	±%
Conservative	Edward Pope	832	66.9	−5.8
Labour	Jacqueline Citarella	411	33.1	+16.1
Majority		421	33.9	−21.7
Turnout		1,243	78.0	+33.5
Conservative hold		Swing		

North Meols
Party	Candidate	Votes	%	±%
Conservative	John Baldock	1,192	65.1	+5.9
Labour	John Hodson	638	34.9	+20.6
Majority		554	30.3	−2.4
Turnout		1,830	57.7	+28.5
Conservative hold		Swing		

Parbold
Party	Candidate	Votes	%	±%
Conservative	Barbara Kean	1,477	63.1	−15.1
Labour	Clare Gillard	864	36.9	+15.1
Majority		613	26.2	−30.1
Turnout		2,341	76.9	+36.1
Conservative hold		Swing		

Scarisbrick
Party	Candidate	Votes	%	±%
Conservative	William Cropper	1,480	69.3	+16.0
Labour	Susan Jones	657	30.7	+17.0
Majority		823	38.5	+10.6
Turnout		2,137	70.9	+34.4
Conservative hold		Swing		

Scott (2)
Party	Candidate	Votes	%	±%
Labour	Noel Delaney	1,500		
Labour	Steve Hanlon	1,379		
Conservative	David Meadows	1,127		
Conservative	Sarah Ainscough	898		
Green	Maurice George	408		
Turnout		5,312	67.3	+32.5
Labour gain from Conservative		Swing		
Labour gain from Conservative		Swing		

Skelmersdale South
Party	Candidate	Votes	%	±%
Labour	Ian McKay	2,228	73.3	+6.6
Conservative	Amanda Shaw	554	18.2	−15.1
Green	Martin Lowe	257	8.5	+8.5
Majority		1,674	55.1	+21.8
Turnout		3,039	61.8	+38.5
Labour hold		Swing		

Tanhouse
Party	Candidate	Votes	%	±%
Labour	Bob Pendleton	1,416	76.6	+24.4
Conservative	Cindy Miller	433	23.4	−24.4
Majority		983	53.2	+48.8
Turnout		1,849	55.2	+32.5
Labour hold		Swing		

Tarleton
Party	Candidate	Votes	%	±%
Conservative	James Kay	2,000	67.9	−19.8
Labour	Gail Hodson	944	32.1	+19.8
Majority		1,056	35.9	−39.4
Turnout		2,944	66.0	+27.1
Conservative hold		Swing		

Up Holland
Party	Candidate	Votes	%	±%
Labour	Ian Moran	1,927	58.1	+15.2
Conservative	Jonathan Kirkby	1,392	41.9	−1.2
Majority		535	16.2	
Turnout		3,319	68.0	+33.6
Labour gain from Independent		Swing		
