= 2010 American Samoan constitutional referendum =

- November 2, 2010
- Do you approve the 2010 amendments to the revised constitution of American Samoa?

Results
Choice	Votes	%
Yes	3,257	29.83%
No	7,660	70.17%

A constitutional referendum was held in American Samoa on November 2, 2010, on the same day of the United States House of Representatives election and American Samoan general election.

Voters voted on amendments to the Constitution of American Samoa which had been approved by a Constitutional convention held from June 21 through July 2, 2010, the 4th such convention. The changes were ultimately rejected by a majority of over 4,000 votes.

== Proposed changes ==
There were a total of 34 or 39 proposed amendments to the Constitution.

At a Constitutional convention in the middle of 2010, the subject of autonomy for American Samoa was discussed, with the issue being raised by the territory's non-voting member in the United States House of Representatives, Eni Faleomavaega. Resulting from this, the proposed Constitution replaced all mentions of "Government of American Samoa" with "American Samoa Government". Additionally, a paragraph in the preamble to the Constitution was proposed to be changed to reflect that American Samoans should "have and enjoy certain rights ... including the right to local self-government". Furthermore, if the changes were accepted, any federal American law seen as being harmful to the economy of the territory or the welfare of American Samoans could be blocked by the Fono.

Other proposed changes to the Constitution included expanding the American Samoa House of Representatives from 20 members (plus one non-voting member from Swains Island) to 25 (plus one), and the American Samoa Senate from 18 to 22 members.

The power of the Governor of American Samoa's veto would have changed with the introduction of veto override into the Constitution, whereby a bill passed by a two-thirds majority by both houses of the American Samoa Fono within 14 months of an original veto will become law immediately. As the referendum failed, any vetoed law re-passed by the Fono still requires further approval by the Governor or the United States Secretary of the Interior. A prior referendum on the issue in 2008 failed by 112 votes, after original results showed a mere 22-vote margin.

The revised draft included a proposal to effect an order of succession should the office of Governor or Lieutenant Governor of American Samoa be vacant.

The new Constitution would have also provided a Samoan language curriculum in the territory's educational system, and introduced a system for post-secondary education to American Samoa. Additionally, it would have established a Public Utilities and Services Commission for the territory, and mandated the enforcement of immigration laws "in order to protect the Samoan culture, lands and way of life".

== Electoral system ==
Despite there being between 30 and 40 different proposed changes to the constitution approved at the constitutional convention all changes were put to a public vote in a single-question referendum. Voters only had the choice to approve all or reject all the proposals, and could not vote on each one individually, resulting in criticism from voters.

Governor Togiola Tulafono was accused of presenting it as a single question in the poll because he wanted approval for all the changes, a charge he denied. The decision to put all the changes on the ballot as a single question had been made by the chief elections officer, who claimed it was "the simplest way to put the question to voters."

The ballot contained the following sole question, printed in both English and Samoan in bold, block letters: "Do you approve the 2010 amendments to the Revised Constitution of American Samoa?" Voters had a choice of voting "yes" or "no".

== Campaign ==
Limited public campaigning took place on the issue of rejecting the constitutional referendum. In Tualauta County in the Western District, the most heavily populated county in American Samoa, there was reportedly concentrated lobbying against the referendum, which was defeated by 609 votes.

The only other public campaigning occurred in Utulei and Tafuna, where a number of residents campaigned against the vote with an advertisement which centered around the decision of the chief elections officer to group all the proposed changes together. The advertisement complained that the amendments "should have been separated, item by item and placed individually on the ballot; they weren't."

== Results ==
Voters rejected the amendments to the Constitution in all 17 electoral districts of American Samoa as well as in the absentee ballot poll.

Choice	Votes	%
For	3,257	29.83
Against	7,660	70.17
**Total**	**10,917**	**100.00**
Registered voters/turnout	16,144	–
Source: Direct Democracy
