= 2010 Grey County municipal elections =

Local election in Ontario, Canada

Elections were held in Grey County, Ontario on October 25, 2010 in conjunction with municipal elections across the province.

== Grey County Council ==
Position	Elected
Chatsworth Mayor	Bob Pringle
Chatsworth Deputy Mayor	Terry McKay
Georgian Bluffs Mayor	Alan Barfoot
Georgian Bluffs Deputy Mayor	Dwight Burley
Grey Highlands Mayor	Wayne Fitzgerald
Grey Highlands Deputy Mayor	Paul McQueen
Hanover Mayor	Kathi Maskell
Hanover Deputy Mayor	Bob White
Meaford Mayor	Francis Richardson
Meaford Deputy Mayor	Harley Greenfield
Owen Sound Mayor	Deborah Haswell
Owen Sound Councillor	Arlene Wright
Southgate Mayor	Brian A. Milne
Southgate Deputy Mayor	Norman Jack
The Blue Mountains Mayor	Ellen Anderson
The Blue Mountains Deputy Mayor	Duncan McKinlay
West Grey Mayor	Kevin Eccles
West Grey Deputy Mayor	John A. Bell

== The Blue Mountains ==
Mayoral candidate	Vote	%
Ellen Anderson (X)	2,041	
Paul M. Mitchell	1,559	
Marshall Heatherington	218	
Sheldon A. Rosen	196	

== Chatsworth ==
Mayoral candidate	Vote	%
Bob Pringle	Acclaimed	

== Georgian Bluffs ==
Mayoral candidate	Vote	%
Alan Barfoot (X)	Acclaimed	

== Grey Highlands ==
Mayoral candidate	Vote	%
Wayne Fitzgerald	2,546	
Brian Mullin (X)	1,967	

== Hanover ==
Mayoral candidate	Vote	%
Kathi Maskell (X)	Acclaimed	

== Meaford ==
Mayoral candidate	Vote	%
Francis Richardson (X)	2,583	
Jim McPherson	2,292	

== Owen Sound ==
Mayoral candidate	Vote	%
Deborah Haswell	3,524	46.52
Ruth Lovell Stanners (X)	3,483	45.97
Raymond Botten	401	5.29
Jerry Gordon Bates	168	2.22

== Southgate ==
Mayoral candidate	Vote	%
Brian A. Milne	1,346	
Mike Scarr	446	

== West Grey ==
Mayoral candidate	Vote	%
Kevin Eccles (X)	2,063	
Dan Sullivan	1,201	
Denise Dunkley	465	
