= 2010 Sudbury District municipal elections =

Elections were held in the organized municipalities in the Sudbury District of Ontario on October 25, 2010 in conjunction with municipal elections across the province.

== Baldwin ==
Archie Boivin was elected as the reeve of Baldwin. Incumbent reeve Dennis Golden ran for re-election as a council candidate rather than as reeve.

Reeve Candidate	Vote	%
Archie Boivin	82	29.81
Richard Gervais	67	24.36
Bert McDowell	65	23.63
Texas MacDonald	61	22.18

== Chapleau ==
Earle Freeborn, the incumbent mayor of Chapleau, did not stand for re-election. The election was won by councillor Andre Byham.

Mayoral Candidate	Vote	%
Andre Byham	736	67.15
William Pellow	285	26.00
Kimmo Keski-Pukkila	75	6.84

== Espanola ==
Councillor Mike Lehoux defeated incumbent mayor Bernie Gagnon in Espanola, in a race which hinged largely on questions regarding the town's contract with Kilganan Group, a real estate developer whose plan for a new factory and residential development in the town has faced delays in 2010.

The election also attracted a bit of humorous media attention to the council candidacy of Jill Beer. Because her surname resulted in her election signs bearing the slogan "Beer for Council", several were seen on lawns in Sudbury as well as in Espanola. Beer won her seat.

Mayoral Candidate	Vote	%
Mike Lehoux	936	41.21
Ron Piche	827	36.41
Bernie Gagnon (X)	369	16.25
Skip Kemsley	139	6.12

== French River ==
Former mayor Claude Bouffard was re-elected in French River over incumbent Collin Bourgeois, who had defeated Bouffard in the 2006 election.

Mayoral Candidate	Vote	%
Claude Bouffard	1,146	44.78
Harold Duff	1,020	39.85
Collin Bourgeois (X)	393	15.35

== Killarney ==
Incumbent mayor Morgan Pitfield won another term by acclamation in Killarney.

Mayoral Candidate	Vote	%
Morgan Pitfield (X)	Acclaimed	

== Markstay-Warren ==
Incumbent mayor Jean-Marc Chayer was defeated in Markstay-Warren, with challenger Sonja Flynn elected.

Mayoral Candidate	Vote	%
Sonja Flynn	464	43.0
Kathy Bennett	393	36.4
Jean-Marc Chayer (X)	223	20.6

== Nairn and Hyman ==
The election campaign in Nairn and Hyman was marked by two anonymous flyers circulated under the name "Concerned Citizens of Nairn and Hyman". The first attacked mayoral candidate Laurier Falldien and council candidates Wayne Austin, Bonnie Vataja, Shelly Lowery and Rod MacDonald, calling them the "Scream Team", while the other endorsed incumbent mayor Brian Channon and incumbent councillors Brigita Gingras, Charlene Martel and Ed Mazey, calling them the "Dream Team". In the final results, the "endorsed" candidates Gingras, Martel and Mazey were all re-elected to council, along with the "unendorsed" candidate Rod MacDonald, but Falldien defeated Channon in an overwhelming landslide for the mayoralty.

Mayoral Candidate	Vote	%
Laurier P. Falldien	285	93.75
Brian J. Channon (X)	19	6.25

== Sables-Spanish Rivers ==
Incumbent mayor Leslie Gamble was re-elected in Sables-Spanish Rivers, while Patricia Hnatiuk will serve as deputy mayor.

Mayoral Candidate	Vote	%
Leslie Gamble (X)	515	48.13
David Wolff	215	20.09
Mac Moffatt	205	19.16
Karen Gerrard	135	12.62

== St. Charles ==
Incumbent mayor Claude Lemieux did not stand for re-election in St. Charles. The election was won by Paul Schoppmann.

Mayoral Candidate	Vote	%
Paul Schoppmann	816	78.8
Gilles Girouard	219	21.2
