= 2010 Dufferin County municipal elections =

Local election in Ontario, Canada

Elections were held in Dufferin County, Ontario on October 25, 2010 in conjunction with municipal elections across the province.

== Dufferin County Council ==
Position	Elected
Amaranth Mayor	Don MacIver
Amaranth Deputy Mayor	Walter Kolodziechuk
East Garafraxa Mayor	Allen Taylor
East Luther Grand Valley Mayor	John Oosterhof
Melancthon Mayor	Bill Hill
Melancthon Deputy Mayor	Darren White
Mono Mayor	Laura Ryan
Mono Deputy Mayor	Ken McGhee
Mulmur Mayor	Paul Mills
Mulmur Deputy Mayor	Rhonda Campbell-Moon
Orangeville Mayor	Rob Adams
Orangeville Deputy Mayor	Warren Maycock
Shelburne Mayor	Edward Crewson
Shelburne Deputy Mayor	Ken J. Bennington

== Amaranth ==
Mayoral Candidate	Vote	%
Don MacIver (X)	616	
Bob Currie	557	

== East Garafraxa ==
Mayoral Candidate	Vote	%
Allen Taylor (X)	492	
Tom Nevills	371	

== East Luther Grand Valley ==
Mayoral Candidate	Vote	%
John Oosterhof (X)	393	
John Ince	291	
Mark Thorpe	210	

== Melancthon ==
Mayoral Candidate	Vote	%
Bill Hill	611	
Rob Uffen	450	

== Mono ==
Mayoral Candidate	Vote	%
Laura Ryan	1,300	
Lorie Haddock (X)	1,250	

== Mulmur ==
Mayoral Candidate	Vote	%
Paul Mills	982	
Gordon Montgomery (X)	819	

== Orangeville ==
Mayoral Candidate	Vote	%
Rob Adams (X)	3,696	
Nick Garisto	2,878	

== Shelburne ==
Mayoral Candidate	Vote	%
Edward Crewson (X)	Acclaimed	
