= 2010 Rainy River District municipal elections =

Municipal elections, Ontario

Elections were held in the organized municipalities in the Rainy River District of Ontario on October 25, 2010 in conjunction with municipal elections across the province.

== Alberton ==
Alberton was one of three municipalities in the region which held no council elections as the entire incumbent council was acclaimed back into office. The council will consist of reeve Michael Hammond and councillors Barb Cournoyer, Doug Mitchell, Peter Spuzak and Mike Ford.

Reeve Candidate	Vote	%
Michael Hammond (X)	Acclaimed	

== Atikokan ==
Incumbent mayor Dennis Brown was re-elected in Atikokan. Jerry Duhamel, Bud Dickson, Bob Gosselin, Mary Makarenko, Marjorie Lambkin and Marlene Davidson were elected to council.

Mayoral Candidate	Vote	%
Dennis Brown (X)	867	80.13
Robert Davidson	215	19.87

== Chapple ==
Incumbent reeve Peter Van Heyst was acclaimed back into office in Chapple. Councillors Ken Wilson, Rilla Race and James Gibson were also acclaimed; the township's only contested council seat was in Ward 4, where Rick Neilson defeated Murray Gerula.

Reeve Candidate	Vote	%
Peter Van Heyst (X)	Acclaimed	

== Dawson ==
Eltjo Wiersema was acclaimed as reeve of Dawson. Brenda Jodoin, Aime Desaulniers, Bennett Drennan and Archie Wiersema were elected to council.

Reeve Candidate	Vote	%
Eltjo Wiersema	Acclaimed	

== Emo ==
Vincent Sheppard defeated incumbent mayor Ed Carlson in Emo. Robert Simmons, Vernon Thompson, Anthony Leek and Gary Judson were elected to council.

Mayoral Candidate	Vote	%
Vincent Sheppard	309	58.19
Ed Carlson (X)	222	41.81

== Fort Frances ==
Fort Frances was one of three municipalities in the region which held no council elections as the entire incumbent council was acclaimed back into office. The council will consist of mayor Roy Avis and councillors John Albanese, Andrew Hallikas, Ken Perry, Paul Ryan, Sharon Tibbs and Rick Wiedenhoeft.

Mayoral Candidate	Vote	%
Roy Avis (X)	Acclaimed	

== La Vallee ==
Ross Donaldson was elected reeve in La Vallee. Dennis Allen, Jim Belluz, Freeda Carmody and Darcy Robson were elected to council.

Reeve Candidate	Vote	%
Ross Donaldson	177	58.22
Kenneth McKinnon	127	41.78

== Lake of the Woods ==
Incumbent reeve Valerie Pizey was re-elected in Lake of the Woods. Colleen Fadden, Glenn Anderson and Bill Lundgren were declared elected to council on election night, while candidates Nancy Gate and JoAnn Moen tied for the remaining seat. A recount confirmed the tie, so the candidates' names were placed in a hat; Moen won the draw.

Reeve Candidate	Vote	%
Valerie Pizey (X)	254	69.59
Gerald Fisk	111	30.41

== Morley ==
Morley was one of three municipalities in the region which held no council elections as the incumbent council was acclaimed back into office. Moe Henry, George Heyens, Maury Nielson and Bill Romyn will serve on council. There were no nominations submitted for the position of reeve; the new council will have to decide whether to appoint one or to schedule a by-election.

== Rainy River ==
Incumbent mayor Deborah Ewald was acclaimed back into office in Rainy River. Larry Armstrong, Ashley Stamler, Brent Anderson and Gord Armstrong were elected to council.

Mayoral Candidate	Vote	%
Deborah Ewald (X)	Acclaimed	
