= 2010 Tallahassee mayoral election =

- August 24, 2010
- Turnout: 32.8%
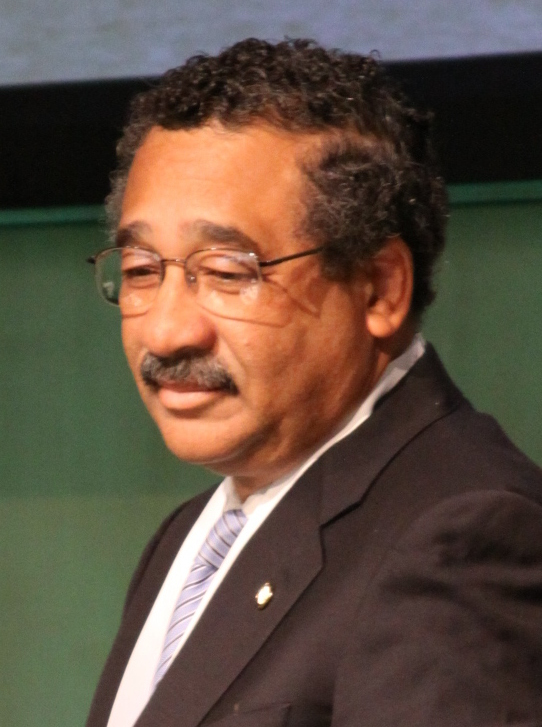

Nominee	John Marks	Steve Stewart	Larry Hendricks
Popular vote	16,592	14,682	1,196
Percentage	51.10%	45.22%	3.68%
Mayor before election
John Marks
Elected Mayor
John Marks

The 2010 Tallahassee mayoral election was held on August 24, 2010, to elect the Mayor of Tallahassee, Florida.

Incumbent mayor John Marks was reelected for a 3rd term with 51.10% of the vote. He primarily faced a challenge from Steve Stewart, founder and editor of the Tallahassee Reports.

== Results ==
2010 Tallahassee mayoral election
Candidate	Votes	%
John Marks (incumbent)	16,592	51.10
Steve Stewart	14,682	45.22
Larry Hendricks	1,196	3.68
