= 2010 United States Virgin Islands general election =

The United States Virgin Islands general election was held on November 2, 2010. Voters chose the Governor of the United States Virgin Islands, the non-voting delegate to the U.S. House of Representatives and all fifteen seats in the Legislature of the Virgin Islands. The election coincided with the 2010 United States general election.

== Gubernatorial ==
Incumbent Democratic Governor John de Jongh and Lt. Governor Gregory Francis was re-elected for a second term in office, and defeated independent gubernatorial candidate and former Lt. Governor Kenneth Mapp and his running mate, Malik Sekou, with almost 57% of the vote.

Candidate	Running mate	Party	Votes	%
John de Jongh	Gregory Francis	Democratic Party	18,645	56.76
Kenneth Mapp	Malik Sekou	Independent	14,167	43.13
Write in			37	0.11
Total			32,849	100.00
Total votes			34,600	–
Registered voters/turnout			51,995	66.54

== Territorial Legislature ==
All fifteen seats in the Legislature of the Virgin Islands were up for election.

Senator At Large
Candidate	Party	Votes	%
Craig W. Barshinger	Democratic Party	15,891	58.71
Lorelei Monsanto	Independent	6,253	23.10
Alecia M. Wells	Independent	4,914	18.15
Write in		9	0.03
Total		27,067	100.00
Total votes		34,600	–
Registered voters/turnout		51,995	66.54

St. Thomas/St. John
Candidate	Party	Votes	%
Shawn-Michael Malone	Democratic Party	8,839	9.93
Carlton "Ital" Dowe	Democratic Party	8,173	9.18
Janette Millin Young	Democratic Party	8,097	9.10
Louis Patrick Hill	Democratic Party	7,496	8.42
Celestino A. White Sr.	Independent	6,726	7.56
Alvin Williams	Democratic Party	6,527	7.33
Patrick Simeon Sprauve	Democratic Party	5,940	6.67
Clarence Payne	Democratic Party	5,516	6.20
Lisa M. Williams	Independent	4,747	5.33
Tregenza Roach	Independent	4,483	5.04
Horace T. Brooks	Independent	3,536	3.97
Dwane A. Callwood	Independent	3,295	3.70
Paul Alexander	Independent	3,076	3.46
Stephen "Smokey" Frett	Independent Citizens Movement	3,016	3.39
Shirley M. Sadler	Independent	1,929	2.17
Darryl Williams	Independent	1,559	1.75
Wayne Adams	Independent Citizens Movement	1,516	1.70
Joseph "Wojo" Gumbs	Independent	1,460	1.64
Elvin R. Fahie Sr.	Independent	1,147	1.29
Delores Todman	Independent	1,136	1.28
Rapheal Corneiro	Independent	764	0.86
Write in		35	0.04
Total		89,013	100.00
Total votes		17,151	–
Registered voters/turnout		26,688	64.26

St. Croix
Candidate	Party	Votes	%
Nellie Rivera O'Reilly	Independent	8,690	9.78
Alicia "Chucky" Hansen	Independent	8,575	9.65
Terrence "Positive" Nelson	Independent Citizens Movement	8,248	9.28
Sammuel Sanes	Democratic Party	7,675	8.63
Neville James	Democratic Party	7,143	8.04
Raymond "Usie" Richards	Independent Citizens Movement	5,511	6.20
Ronald E. Russell	Democratic Party	5,437	6.12
Diane Capehart	Democratic Party	4,706	5.29
Judi Fricks	Independent	4,625	5.20
James A. Weber III	Democratic Party	4,420	4.97
Michael Thurland	Democratic Party	4,210	4.74
Wayne A. G. James	Democratic Party	3,371	3.79
Norman Baptiste	Independent	3,058	3.44
Naomi Joseph	Independent Citizens Movement	3,057	3.44
Kendall Seigo Petersen	Independent Citizens Movement	3,011	3.39
Michael J. Springer Jr.	Independent	1,986	2.23
Myron Allick	Independent	1,302	1.46
Wayne "Bully" Petersen	Independent	1,295	1.46
George Moore	Independent Citizens Movement	1,162	1.31
Lee A. Seward Jr.	Independent	735	0.83
Samuel Flemming	Independent	636	0.72
Write in		32	0.04
Total		88,885	100.00
Total votes		17,449	–
Registered voters/turnout		25,307	68.95

== Delegate to the United States House of Representatives ==
2010 United States House of Representatives election in the United States Virgin Islands
- November 2, 2010
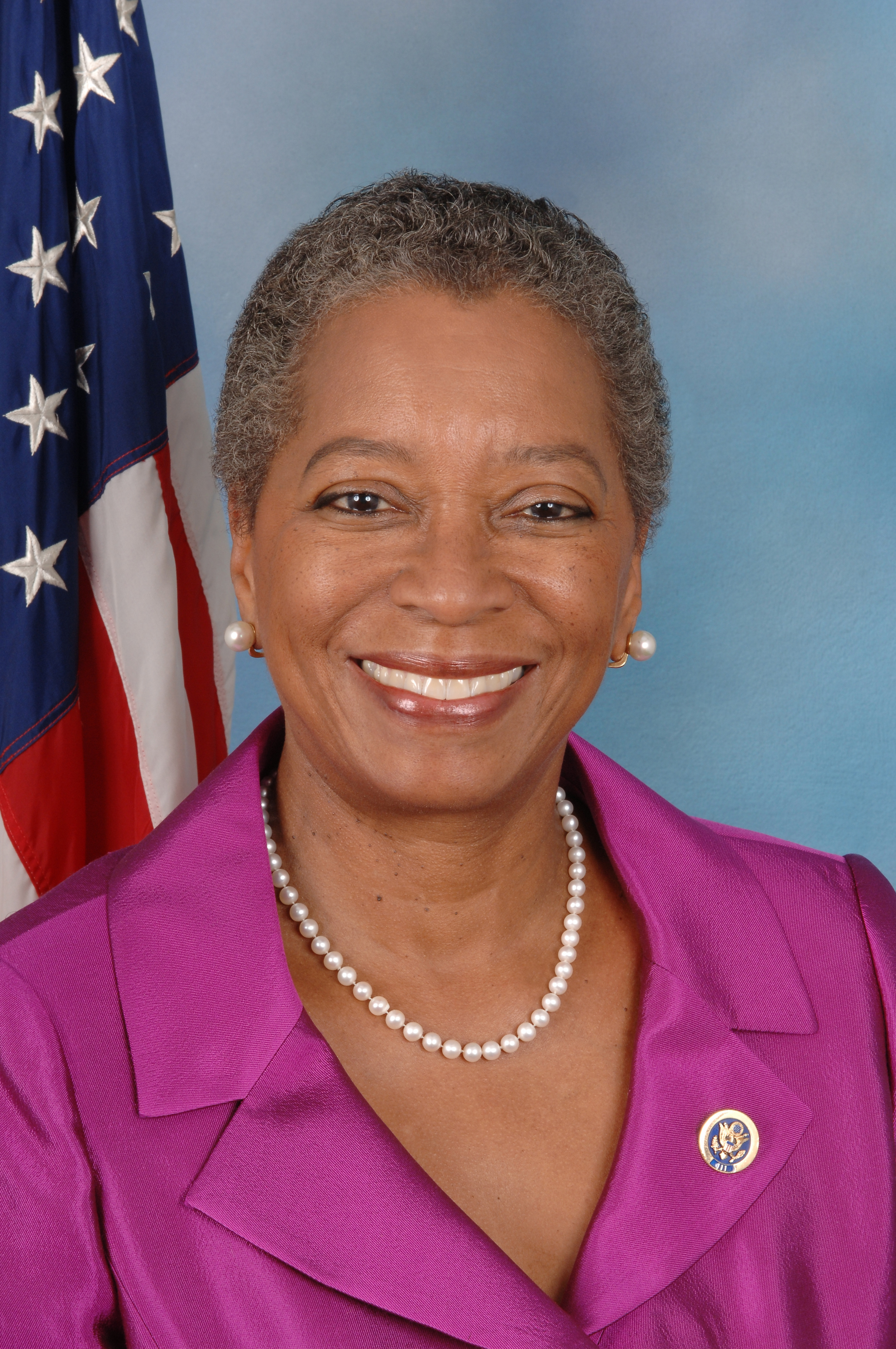

Nominee	Donna Christian-Christensen	Jeffrey Moorhead	Vince Danet
Party	Democratic	Independent	Republican
Popular vote	19,844	5,063	2,329
Percentage	71.73%	18.30%	8.42%
Representative before election
Donna Christian-Christensen
Democratic
Elected Representative
Donna Christian-Christensen
Democratic

Incumbent U.S. Virgin Islands Delegate Donna Christian-Christensen, a Democrat, sought re-election. The non-voting delegate to the House of Representatives from the United States Virgin Islands is elected for two-year terms. The winner of the race served in the 112th Congress from January 3, 2011, until January 3, 2013.

Incumbent U.S. Virgin Islands Delegate Donna Christian-Christensen, a Democrat, formally announced her campaign for re-election on Sunday, July 25, 2010. Christensen, who had held the seat since 1997, ran unopposed in 2008. In 2010, Christensen was challenged by Republican Vincent Emile Danet and two independent candidates – Guillaume Mimoun and Jeffrey Moorhead, a Saint Croix attorney.

Christian-Christansen won the general election with 71% of the vote.

Candidate	Party	Votes	%
Donna Christian-Christensen	Democratic Party	19,844	71.73
Jeffrey Moorhead	Independent	5,063	18.30
Vincent Emile Danet	Republican Party	2,329	8.42
Guillaume Mimoun	Independent	419	1.51
Write in		11	0.04
Total		27,666	100.00
Total votes		34,600	–
Registered voters/turnout		51,995	66.54

== Board of Elections ==
Members of the Board of Elections were elected.
