= 2010 Northumberland County municipal elections =

Local election in Ontario, Canada

Elections were held in Northumberland County, Ontario, on October 25, 2010, in conjunction with municipal elections across the province.

== Northumberland County Council ==
Position	Elected
Mayor of Alnwick/Haldimand	Dalton McDonald
Mayor of Brighton	Mark Walas
Mayor of Cobourg	Gil Brocanier
Mayor of Cramahe	Marc Coombs
Mayor of Hamilton	Mark Lovshin
Mayor of Port Hope	Linda M. Thompson
Mayor of Trent Hills	Hector MacMillan

== Alnwick/Haldimand ==
Mayoral Candidate	Vote	%
Dalton McDonald	899	
Art Jeninga	842	
Rosemarie Robins	809	

== Brighton ==
Mayoral Candidate	Vote	%
Mark Walas	2,660	
Brian Ostrander	2,239	

== Cobourg ==
Mayoral Candidate	Vote	%
Gil Brocanier	4,408	
Manfred Schumann	1,937	

== Cramahe ==
Mayoral Candidate	Vote	%
Marc Coombs (X)	1,383	
Elie Dekeyser	1,161	

== Hamilton ==
Mayoral Candidate	Vote	%
Mark Lovshin (X)	Acclaimed	

== Port Hope ==
Mayoral Candidate	Vote	%
Linda M. Thompson (X)	2467	
Robert T. Chatten	156	
John B. Floyd	1781	
William Spotton	774	
Davidson Tate	584	

== Trent Hills ==
Mayoral Candidate	Vote	%
Hector MacMillan (X)	3721	
Bob Fudge	2282	
