= 2010 Ivano-Frankivsk Oblast local election =

Local election in Ukraine

- 31 October 2010

All 114 seats to the Ivano-Frankivsk Oblast Council
	Majority party	Minority party	Third party
Leader	Oleksandr Sych	Yulia Tymoshenko	Zinoviy Shkutyak
Party	Svoboda	Batkivshchyna	Our Ukraine
Seats won	18	16	15
Percentage	14.90%	14.00%	13.20%
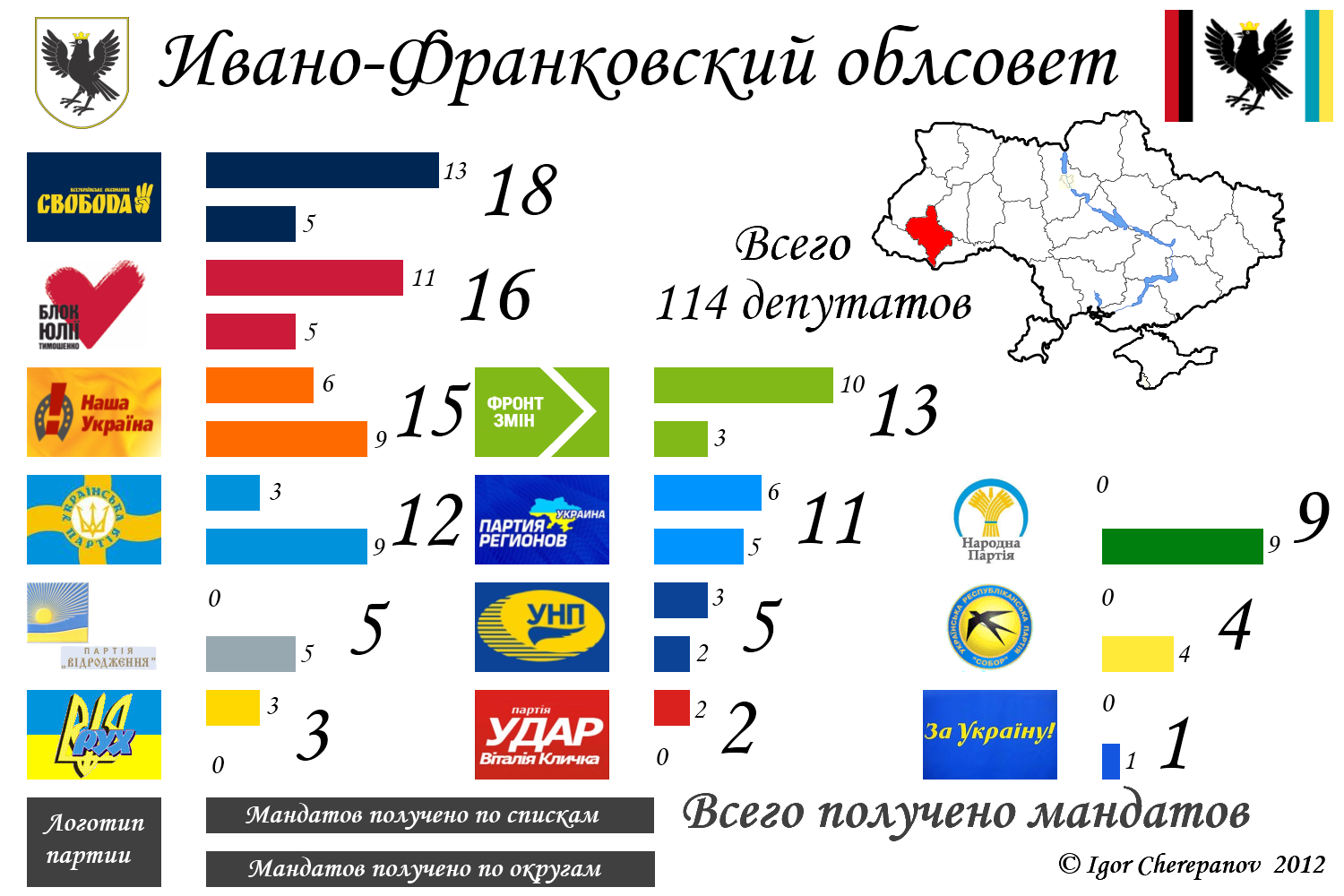
Head of Council before election
Ihor Oliynyk
Our Ukraine
Elected Head of Council
Oleksandr Sych
Svoboda

Ivano-Frankivsk Oblast local election, 2010 is a local election in Ivano-Frankivsk Oblast that took place on October 31, 2010. Seats were split among 13 political parties.

== Results ==
Seats and percentage
Svoboda (18)	14.90%
Fatherland (16)	14.00%
Our Ukraine (15)	13.20%
Front of Changes (13)	11.40%
Party of Regions (11)	9.60%
Ukrainian Party (11)	9.60%
People's Party (9)	7.90%
Revival (5)	4.40%
Ukrainian People's Party (5)	4.40%
Cathedral (4)	3.50%
RUKh (3)	2.60%
UDAR (2)	1.80%
For Ukraine! (1)	0.90%

Chairman of the council elections

- Oleksandr Sych (regional leader of Svoboda)
- Zynoviy Mytnyk (Minister of Ukraine in protection of health)

== Ivano-Frankivsk city council ==
Seats and percentage
Svoboda (35)	58.30%
Front of Changes (9)	15.00%
Fatherland (5)	8.30%
Party of Regions (4)	6.70%
Our Ukraine (2)	3.30%
UDAR (2)	3.30%
Third power (2)	3.30%
Cathedral (1)	1.70%

Mayor elections

- Anushkevychus (Ukrainian People's Party) - 27.20%
- Solovei (Third power) - 22.48%
- Prokopiv (Front of Changes) - 14.50%
- Against all - 4.50%

== Notes ==
Due to the lack of candidates to deputies, All-Ukrainian Union "Freedom" chose not to fill its available place in the Ivano-Frankivsk city council cutting the size of the council to 59.
