= 2010 Frontenac County municipal elections =

Local election in Ontario, Canada

Elections were held in Frontenac County, Ontario on October 25, 2010 in conjunction with municipal elections across the province.

== Frontenac County Council ==
The County Council has consisted of the four Township mayors since Amalgamation in 1998. A by-law was passed in 2009 increasing the size of County Council beginning in the next term (2011 - 2014) to eight members. The eight members will include the four Township mayors and one additional member from each Township Council. The additional Council member will be chosen by each Township Council at their inaugural meetings.

== Central Frontenac ==
Mayoral Candidate	Vote	%
Janet Gutowski (X)	1,713	
Logan W. K. Murray	1,161	
Douglas Lee	434	

== Frontenac Islands ==
Mayoral Candidate	Vote	%
Denis Doyle	744	
Jim Vanden Hoek (X)	703	

== North Frontenac ==
Mayoral Candidate	Vote	%
Bud Clayton	1,170	
Jim Beam	1,061	

== South Frontenac ==
Mayoral Candidate	Vote	%
Gary Davison (X)	4,460	
John Fillion	2,979	
