= 2010 Lanark County municipal elections =

Local election in Ontario, Canada

Elections were held in Lanark County, Ontario on October 25, 2010 in conjunction with municipal elections across the province.

== Lanark County Council ==
Position	Elected
Beckwith Reeve	Richard Kidd
Beckwith Deputy Reeve	Sharon Mousseau
Carleton Place Mayor	Wendy LeBlanc
Carleton Place Deputy Mayor	Ed Sonnenburg
Drummond/North Elmsley Reeve	Aubrey Churchill
Drummond/North Elmsley Deputy Reeve	(selected from council)
Lanark Highlands Mayor	Peter McLaren
Lanark Higlands Deputy Mayor	(selected from council)
Mississippi Mills Mayor	John Levi
Mississippi Mills Councillor	(selected from council)
Montague Reeve	Bill Dobson
Montague Deputy Reeve	Pat Dolan
Perth Mayor	John Fenik
Perth Deputy Mayor	Gemmell
Tay Valley Reeve	Keith Kerr
Tay Valley Deputy Reeve	Susan Freeman

== Beckwith ==
Mayoral Candidate	Vote	%
Richard Kidd (X)	1,152	
Ross Trimble	725	
Keith Salisbury	195	

== Carleton Place ==
Mayoral Candidate	Vote	%
Wendy LeBlanc	2,621	
Paul Dulmage (X)	1,191	

== Drummond/North Elmsley ==
Mayoral Candidate	Vote	%
Aubrey Churchill (X)	Acclaimed	

== Lanark Highlands ==
Mayoral Candidate	Vote	%
Peter M. McLaren	1,882	
Bob Fletcher (X)	1,007	
Cory L. Donaldson	412	
Ryta E. Dulmage	294	

== Mississippi Mills ==
Mayoral Candidate	Vote	%
John Levi	2,128	
Brenda Hurrle	1,929	
Jane Torrance	1,166	

== Montague ==
Reeve Candidate	Vote	%
Bill Dobson	637	
Gary Doyle	625	
John MacTavish (X)	324	

== Perth ==
Mayoral Candidate	Vote	%
John Fenik (X)	Acclaimed	

== Tay Valley ==
Reeve Candidate	Vote	%
Keith Kerr (X)	Acclaimed	
