= 2010 Swiss referendums =

National referendums held in Switzerland in 2010

Six referendums were held in Switzerland during 2010; three in March on pension funds, animal protection and a constitutional amendment, one in September on unemployment benefits, and two in November on deporting foreign criminals and introducing a canton tax.

== Results ==
=== March ===
Voters approved Provision 1, an amendment to the constitution on research on humans.

Choice	Votes	%	Cantons		
Choice	Votes	%	Full	Half	Total
For	1,708,488	77.21	20	6	23
Against	504,167	22.79	0	0	0
Invalid/blank votes	84,893	–	–	–	–
Total	2,297,548	100	20	6	23
Registered voters/turnout	5,051,169	45.49	–	–	–

Voters rejected Provision 2, a federal decree on providing enhanced legal protection for animals.

Choice	Votes	%	Cantons		
Choice	Votes	%	Full	Half	Total
For	671,731	29.50	0	0	0
Against	1,605,141	70.50	20	6	23
Invalid/blank votes	37,618	–	–	–	–
Total	2,314,490	100	20	6	23
Registered voters/turnout	5,051,169	45.82	–	–	–

Voters also rejected Provision 3, a federal law which would change the minimum conversion rate for occupational and disability pension plans.

Choice	Votes	%
For	617,209	27.27
Against	1,646,369	72.73
Invalid/blank votes	47,474	–
Total	2,311,052	100
Registered voters/turnout	5,051,169	45.75

=== September ===
The referendum held on 26 September had a single topic, namely the revision of unemployment benefits. The centre and right-wing parties were in favour of the revision, which was undertaken to reduce the debt of the ALV, while the left-wing parties were against it.

The referendum was approved by 53.4% of voters, although only the German-speaking cantons (all of them except Basel-Stadt, which was against it with 50.4%) approved it.

Choice	Votes	%
For	958,913	53.42
Against	836,101	46.58
Invalid/blank votes	24,463	–
Total	1,819,477	100
Registered voters/turnout	5,077,180	35.84

=== November ===
The referendum held on 28 November had two issues:

- «Für die Ausschaffung krimineller Ausländer» ("For the deportation of criminal foreigners"), proposed by the Swiss People's Party, as well as a counterproposal by the other partes; and
- «Steuergerechtigkeits-Initiative» ("Taxation justice initiative") for higher taxes on high incomes and property as well as the introduction of a minimum cantonal tax.

The SVP's federal popular initiative on deportation was accepted with 52.2% and a majority of cantons in favour, while the counterproposal failed with only 44.5% in favour. Whilst it was not required, the tie-breaker showed a majority of voters against but a majority of cantons for. On 28 February 2016, a follow-up initiative, also launched by the SVP, was rejected by voters. The deportation initiative went in effect on 1 October 2016.

Question	For					Against					Blank		Invalid votes	Total	Registered voters	Turnout
Question	Votes	%	Cantons			Votes	%	Cantons			Votes	%	Invalid votes	Total	Registered voters	Turnout
Question	Votes	%	Full	Half	Total	Votes	%	Full	Half	Total	Votes	%	Invalid votes	Total	Registered voters	Turnout
Proposal	1,397,923	52.26	15	5	17.5	1,243,942	46.51	5	1	5.5	32,762	1.23	16,172	2,690,799	5,084,053	52.93
Counter-proposal	1,189,269	44.46	0	0	0	1,407,830	52.64	20	6	23	77,528	2.90	16,172	2,690,799	5,084,053	52.93

Tie-breaker
Choice	Votes	%	Cantons		
Choice	Votes	%	Full	Half	Total
Proposal	1,252,761	46.84	13	4	15
Counter-proposal	1,271,365	47.53	7	2	8
Blank	150,501	5.63	–	–	–
Invalid votes	16,172	–	–	–	–
Total	2,690,799	100	20	3	23
Registered voters/turnout	5'084'053	52.93	–	–	–
Source: Direct Democracy

The taxation initiative failed with only 41.5% in favour.

Choice	Votes	%	Cantons		
Choice	Votes	%	Full	Half	Total
For	1,073,229	41.54	3	1	3.5
Against	1,510,589	58.46	17	5	19.5
Invalid/blank votes	78,292	–	–	–	–
Total	2,662,110	100	20	6	23
Registered voters/turnout	5,084,053	52.36	–	–	–

== Withdrawn ==
In August 2010, family members of a murder victim launched another constitutional amendment initiative to provide for capital punishment in cases of murder combined with sexual violence. The initiative quickly found itself at the center of public attention and was roundly rejected by political leaders; it was withdrawn a day after its official publication.
