= 2010 Leeds and Grenville United Counties municipal elections =

Elections were held in Leeds and Grenville United Counties, Ontario on October 25, 2010 in conjunction with municipal elections across the province.

== Leeds and Grenville United Counties Council ==
| Position | Elected |
|---|---|
| Athens Mayor | Herb Scott |
| Augusta Reeve | Mel Campbell |
| Edwardsburgh/Cardinal Mayor | Bill Sloan |
| Elizabethtown-Kitley Mayor | Jim Pickard |
| Front of Yonge Reeve | Roger Haley |
| Leeds and the Thousand Islands Mayor | Bruce Bryan |
| Merrickville-Wolford Mayor | J. Douglas Struthers |
| North Grenville Mayor | David Gordon |
| Rideau Lakes Mayor | Ron Holman |
| Westport Mayor | Bill Thake |

== Athens ==
| Mayoral Candidate | Vote | % |
|---|---|---|
| Herb Scott | 632 | |
| Yuergen Beck | 299 | |
| John Conley (X) | 260 | |

== Augusta ==
| Reeve Candidate | Vote | % |
|---|---|---|
| Mel Campbell (X) | Acclaimed | |

== Edwardsburgh/Cardinal ==
| Mayoral Candidate | Vote | % |
|---|---|---|
| Bill Sloan | 1,557 | |
| Larry Dishaw (X) | 931 | |

== Elizabethtown-Kitley ==
| Mayoral Candidate | Vote | % |
|---|---|---|
| Jim Pickard (X) | Acclaimed | |

== Front of Yonge ==
| Reeve Candidate | Vote | % |
|---|---|---|
| Roger Haley (X) | 653 | |
| Carson Massey | 207 | |

== Leeds and the Thousand Islands ==
| Mayoral Candidate | Vote | % |
|---|---|---|
| Bruce Bryan | 2,014 | 51.84 |
| Frank Kinsella (X) | 1,586 | 40.82 |
| Dennis Reid | 285 | 7.34 |

== Merrickville-Wolford ==
| Mayoral Candidate | Vote | % |
|---|---|---|
| J. Douglas Struthers (X) | Acclaimed | |

== North Grenville ==
| Mayoral Candidate | Vote | % |
|---|---|---|
| David Gordon | 3,308 | |
| Bill Gooch (X) | 1,740 | |
| Barrie Taylor | 251 | |

== Rideau Lakes ==
| Mayoral Candidate | Vote | % |
|---|---|---|
| Ron Holman (X) | 3,574 | |
| Donald Willis | 1,935 | |

== Westport ==
| Mayoral Candidate | Vote | % |
|---|---|---|
| Bill Thake (X) | Acclaimed | |
