= 2010 Haliburton County municipal elections =

Local election in Ontario, Canada

Elections were held in Haliburton County, Ontario on October 25, 2010 in conjunction with municipal elections across the province.

== Haliburton County Council ==
The Haliburton County Council consists of the reeves and deputy reeves of the four constituent municipalities. A warden is elected from the eight members.

Position	Elected
Algonquin Highlands Reeve	Carol Moffatt
Algonquin Highlands Deputy Reeve	(chosen from council)
Dysart et al Reeve	Murray Fearrey
Dysart et al Deputy Reeve	Bill Davis
Highlands East Reeve	Dave Burton
Highlands East Deputy Reeve	(chosen from council)
Minden Hills Reeve	Barb Reid
Minden Hills Deputy Reeve	Cheryl Murdoch

== Algonquin Highlands ==
Reeve Candidate	Vote	%
Carol Moffatt	Acclaimed	

== Dysart et al ==
Reeve Candidate	Vote	%
Murray Fearry (X)	Acclaimed	

== Highlands East ==
Reeve Candidate	Vote	%
Dave Burton (X)	2,156	
Jack Bartholomew	1,195	

== Minden Hills ==
Reeve Candidate	Vote	%
Barb Reid	2,693	
Jim McMahon (X)	2,381	
