= 2010 Lennox and Addington County municipal elections =

Local election in Ontario, Canada

Elections were held in Lennox and Addington County, Ontario on October 25, 2010, in conjunction with municipal elections across the province.

== Lennox and Addington County Council ==
The County Council consists of the three municipal reeves, mayor of Greater Napanee and the three deputy reeves and the Deputy Reeve of Greater Napanee.

Position	Elected
Addington Highlands Reeve	Henry Hogg
Addington Highlands Deputy Reeve	Bill Cox (selected from council)
Greater Napanee Mayor	Gordon Schermerhorn
Greater Napanee Deputy Mayor	Roger Cole
Loyalist Reeve	Bill Lowry
Loyalist Deputy Reeve	Ric Bresee
Stone Mills Reeve	Douglas Bearance
Stone Mills Deputy Reeve	Eric Smith

== Addington Highlands ==
Reeve Candidate	Vote	%
Henry Hogg (X)	Acclaimed	

== Greater Napanee ==
Mayoral Candidate	Vote	%
Gordon Schermerhorn (X)	2,775	58.8
Gary Hodson	1,731	36.7
David Kirkman	216	4.6

== Loyalist ==
Reeve Candidate	Vote	%
Bill Lowry	2,340	
Clayton McEwen (X)	1,327	

== Stone Mills ==
Reeve Candidate	Vote	%
Douglas Bearance	1,235	
Debbie Thompson (X)	1,085	
