= 2010 St Albans City and District Council election =

2010 UK local government election

Map of the results of the 2010 St Albans City and District Council election. Conservatives in blue and Liberal Democrats in yellow.

The 2010 St Albans City and District Council election took place on 6 May 2010 to elect members of St Albans District Council in Hertfordshire, England. One third of the council was up for election and the Liberal Democrats stayed in overall control of the council.

After the election, the composition of the council was:

- Liberal Democrats 29
- Conservative 24
- Labour 3
- Independent 1
- Vacant 1

== Campaign ==
Before the election the Liberal Democrats ran the council with exactly half of the seats, relying on the independents and the mayor's casting vote to have control. The election took place at the same time as the 2010 general election with a seat being contested in all 20 wards of the council. The Liberal Democrats, Conservatives, Labour and Green parties stood for all of the seats, while there were 2 candidates from the United Kingdom Independence Party and 1 from the British National Party (BNP), making this the first time the BNP had stood for the council.

Key wards were seen as being Batchwood, London Colney and Sopwell, with the Labour group leader Roma Mills defending Batchwood. The Liberal Democrats defended their record in control of the council, pointing to no increase in council tax for the previous 2 years and work on preserving the green belt, recycling and congestion. However the Conservatives felt the election provided an opportunity for them to deprive the Liberal Democrats of a majority on the back of increased turnout due to the general election.

== Election result ==
The Liberal Democrats retained control of the council with 29 seats after gaining 2 seats, but losing another 2. They took Batchwood from Labour by 1 vote, defeating the Labour group leader Roma Mills, and also Marshalswick South from the Conservatives. However they lost both Harpenden East and Wheathampstead to the Conservatives to remain on the same number of seats. Meanwhile, the Conservatives made a further 2 gains taking London Colney from Labour and Redbourn from an independent, Susan Carr, who did not contest the election. This put the Conservatives on 24 seats, while Labour held 3 and there was 1 independent.

One seat remained vacant in Ashley ward after the death of Liberal Democrat councillor Mike Ellis.

St Albans local election result 2010
Party	Seats	Gains	Losses	Net gain/loss	Seats %	Votes %	Votes	+/−
Conservative	10	4	1	+3	50.0	42.0	32,952	-1.2%
Liberal Democrats	10	2	2	0	50.0	38.2	29,981	+3.9%
Labour	0	0	2	-2	0	14.1	11,093	+1.5%
Green	0	0	0	0	0	4.7	3,706	-2.0%
UKIP	0	0	0	0	0	0.5	398	+0.5%
BNP	0	0	0	0	0	0.3	255	+0.3%
Independent	0	0	1	-1	0	0.03	20	-3.2%

== Ward results ==
Ashley
Party	Candidate	Votes	%	±%
Liberal Democrats	Anthony Rowlands	2,006	49.2	−0.8
Conservative	Guy Young	1,117	27.4	+1.8
Labour	John Paton	712	17.5	+4.1
Green	Graham Ward	244	6.0	−5.0
Majority		889	21.8	−2.6
Turnout		4,079	73.4	+35.7
Liberal Democrats hold		Swing		

Batchwood
Party	Candidate	Votes	%	±%
Liberal Democrats	Amanda Archer	1,269	32.5	−6.9
Labour	Roma Mills	1,268	32.5	+0.5
Conservative	Tim Smith	1,188	30.4	+9.7
Green	Naomi Love	179	4.6	−3.3
Majority		1	0.0	−7.4
Turnout		3,904	71.8	+30.9
Liberal Democrats gain from Labour		Swing		

Clarence
Party	Candidate	Votes	%	±%
Liberal Democrats	Joyce Lusby	1,807	47.9	+0.3
Conservative	Dursun Altun	1,115	29.5	−1.1
Labour	Helen Ives-Rose	556	14.7	+4.4
Green	Pete Eggleston	297	7.9	−3.6
Majority		692	18.3	+1.3
Turnout		3,775	76.4	+33.1
Liberal Democrats hold		Swing		

Colney Heath
Party	Candidate	Votes	%	±%
Liberal Democrats	Jamie Day	1,555	50.0	−17.3
Conservative	Lynn Myland	1,139	36.7	+12.4
Labour	Michael Mulholland	298	9.6	+5.0
Green	Robert Barton	115	3.7	0.0
Majority		416	13.4	−29.6
Turnout		3,107	73.6	+33.4
Liberal Democrats hold		Swing		

Cunningham
Party	Candidate	Votes	%	±%
Liberal Democrats	Rob Prowse	1,596	45.7	−3.3
Conservative	James Vessey	1,061	30.4	−2.9
Labour	John Metcalf	667	19.1	+8.6
Green	Greg Riener	167	4.8	−2.4
Majority		535	15.3	−0.4
Turnout		3,491	71.0	+29.6
Liberal Democrats hold		Swing		

Harpenden East
Party	Candidate	Votes	%	±%
Conservative	Dean Russell	1,949	47.6	−4.0
Liberal Democrats	Alison Steer	1,740	42.5	+3.8
Labour	Richard Lane	282	6.9	+0.4
Green	Tim Blackwell	123	3.0	−0.3
Majority		209	5.1	−7.8
Turnout		4,094	75.1	+28.7
Conservative gain from Liberal Democrats		Swing		

Harpenden North
Party	Candidate	Votes	%	±%
Conservative	Geoffrey Turner	2,200	55.0	−9.4
Liberal Democrats	Gordon Burrow	1,205	30.1	+9.0
Labour	Rosemary Ross	430	10.7	+3.1
Green	Annett Tate	168	4.2	−2.6
Majority		995	24.9	−18.4
Turnout		4,003	76.3	+40.0
Conservative hold		Swing		

Harpenden South
Party	Candidate	Votes	%	±%
Conservative	Teresa Heritage	2,747	65.3	−9.9
Liberal Democrats	Paul Spinks	927	22.0	+8.2
Labour	Linda Spiri	346	8.2	+2.0
Green	Tony Grover	189	4.5	−0.3
Majority		1,820	43.2	−18.2
Turnout		4,209	78.3	+29.9
Conservative hold		Swing		

Harpenden West
Party	Candidate	Votes	%	±%
Conservative	Julian Daly	2,670	59.0	−9.0
Liberal Democrats	Jeff Phillips	1,242	27.5	+8.5
Labour	Ben Dearman	442	9.8	+2.5
Green	Lydia El-Khouri	169	3.7	−2.0
Majority		1,428	31.6	−17.4
Turnout		4,523	77.1	+37.5
Conservative hold		Swing		

London Colney
Party	Candidate	Votes	%	±%
Conservative	Irene Willcocks	1,774	38.2	−9.3
Labour	Dreda Gordon	1,526	32.8	−9.4
Liberal Democrats	Vibs Nazeri	991	21.3	+15.6
BNP	Danny Seabrook	255	5.5	+5.5
Green	Tamara Fogarty	102	2.2	−2.4
Majority		248	5.3	0.0
Turnout		4,648	67.7	+31.1
Conservative gain from Labour		Swing		

Marshalswick North
Party	Candidate	Votes	%	±%
Liberal Democrats	Tom Clegg	1,827	47.8	−3.6
Conservative	John Foster	1,479	38.7	+0.5
Labour	Ruairi McCourt	372	9.7	+4.1
Green	Rosalind Paul	142	3.7	−1.1
Majority		348	9.1	−4.1
Turnout		3,820	76.7	+29.3
Liberal Democrats hold		Swing		

Marshalswick South
Party	Candidate	Votes	%	±%
Liberal Democrats	Rod Perks	1,706	40.4	−7.3
Conservative	Salih Gaygusuz	1,676	39.7	+5.7
Labour	Anthony Nicholson	596	14.1	+3.9
Green	Jill Mills	247	5.8	−2.3
Majority		30	0.7	−13.0
Turnout		4,225	78.8	+30.7
Liberal Democrats gain from Conservative		Swing		

Park Street
Party	Candidate	Votes	%	±%
Liberal Democrats	Aislinn Lee	1,876	46.4	−4.4
Conservative	Stella Nash	1,472	36.4	−2.5
Labour	Dominic Benson	372	9.2	+2.3
UKIP	Roger Gray	218	5.4	+5.4
Green	Lucy Egglestone	85	2.1	−1.2
Independent	Mark Ewington	20	0.5	+0.5
Majority		404	10.0	−1.9
Turnout		4,043	73.7	+32.3
Liberal Democrats hold		Swing		

Redbourn
Party	Candidate	Votes	%	±%
Conservative	Roger Gray	1,789	49.2	+16.5
Liberal Democrats	Colin O'Donovan	1,453	39.9	+39.9
Labour	Jane Cloke	249	6.8	+2.9
Green	Thomas Hardy	148	4.1	+0.4
Majority		336	9.3	
Turnout		3,639	75.5	+30.7
Conservative gain from Independent		Swing		

Sandridge
Party	Candidate	Votes	%	±%
Conservative	Beric Read	1,560	52.3	−5.5
Liberal Democrats	Helen Bishop	956	32.0	+9.7
Labour	Richard Harris	332	11.1	+0.1
Green	Ian Troughton	137	4.6	−4.4
Majority		604	20.2	−15.3
Turnout		2,985	76.7	+37.3
Conservative hold		Swing		

Sopwell
Party	Candidate	Votes	%	±%
Liberal Democrats	David Poor	1,487	40.4	+5.9
Labour	Janet Smith	1,058	28.7	−5.6
Conservative	Bruce Snell	917	24.9	+2.5
Green	Kate Metcalf	219	5.9	−3.0
Majority		429	11.7	+11.5
Turnout		3,681	69.0	+28.8
Liberal Democrats hold		Swing		

St Peters
Party	Candidate	Votes	%	±%
Liberal Democrats	Michael Green	1,752	42.0	+5.5
Conservative	Emma Harding	1,227	29.4	−1.8
Labour	John Baker	646	15.5	+0.3
Green	Simon Grover	550	13.2	−3.9
Majority		525	12.6	+7.3
Turnout		4,175	71.9	+33.1
Liberal Democrats hold		Swing		

St Stephen
Party	Candidate	Votes	%	±%
Conservative	Sue Featherstone	2,244	55.5	−16.5
Liberal Democrats	Jon Humphrey	1,284	31.8	+15.1
Labour	Janet Blackwell	394	9.8	+2.7
Green	Lesley Baker	119	2.9	−1.3
Majority		960	23.8	−21.5
Turnout		4,041	77.6	+34.9
Conservative hold		Swing		

Verulam
Party	Candidate	Votes	%	±%
Conservative	Nathanael Young	1,794	42.1	+1.1
Liberal Democrats	Catherine Barron	1,704	40.0	−7.5
Labour	Netta Gibbs	383	9.0	+4.3
Green	Margaret Grover	199	4.7	−2.2
UKIP	Philip Roe	180	4.2	+4.2
Majority		90	2.1	
Turnout		4,260	82.1	+29.6
Conservative hold		Swing		

Wheathampstead
Party	Candidate	Votes	%	±%
Conservative	Annie Brewster	1,834	49.5	−1.4
Liberal Democrats	Judy Shardlow	1,598	43.2	+0.7
Labour	David Lawlor	164	4.4	+0.9
Green	Kristian Tizzard	107	2.9	−0.2
Majority		236	6.4	−2.0
Turnout		3,703	78.1	+25.6
Conservative gain from Liberal Democrats		Swing		

== By-elections between 2010 and 2011 ==
A by-election was held in Ashley ward on 3 June 2010 after the death of Liberal Democrat councillor Mike Ellis. The seat was held for the Liberal Democrats by Andy Grant with a majority of 420 votes over Labour.

Ashley by-election 3 June 2010
Party	Candidate	Votes	%	±%
Liberal Democrats	Andy Grant	774	49.5	+0.3
Labour	John Paton	354	22.6	+5.1
Conservative	Christopher Baker	342	21.9	−5.5
Green	Graham Ward	93	6.0	0.0
Majority		420	26.9	+5.1
Turnout		1,563	27.9	−45.5
Liberal Democrats hold		Swing		
