= 2010 Muskoka District municipal elections =

Elections were held in the Muskoka District Municipality of Ontario on October 25, 2010, in conjunction with municipal elections across the province.

== Muskoka District Council ==
Consists of a chair plus mayors of the municipalities as well as a number of district councillors.

Position	Elected
Bracebridge Mayor	Graydon Smith
Bracebridge Councillor	Steve Clement
Bracebridge Councillor	Scott Young
Bracebridge Councillor	Lori-Lynn Giaschi-Pacini
Georgian Bay Mayor	Larry Braid
Georgian Bay Councillor	Paul Wiancko
Georgian Bay Councillor	Mike Kennedy
Gravenhurst Mayor	Paisley Donaldson
Gravenhurst Councillor	Rosemary King
Gravenhurst Councillor	Sandy Cairns
Gravenhurst Councillor	Bob Colhoun
Huntsville Mayor	Claude Doughty
Huntsville Councillor	Scott Aitchison
Huntsville Councillor	Brian Thompson
Huntsville Councillor	Fran Coleman
Lake of Bays Mayor	Bob Young
Lake of Bays Councillor	Shane Baker
Lake of Bays Councillor	Bob Lacroix
Muskoka Lakes Mayor	Alice Murphy
Muskoka Lakes Councillor	Ruth-Ellen Nishikawa
Muskoka Lakes Councillor	Allen Edwards
Muskoka Lakes Councillor	Phil Harding

== Bracebridge ==
Mayoral candidate	Vote	%
Graydon Smith	2,882	
Larry Stroud	1,954	
John Duck	1,422	

== Georgian Bay ==
Mayoral candidate	Vote	%
Larry Braid	2,642	
James R. Walden (X)	1,262	

== Gravenhurst ==
Mayoral candidate	Vote	%
Paisley Donaldson	3,217	
Mark Clairmont	1,439	
Terry P. Pilger	995	
Shawn Kelly	327	

== Huntsville ==
Mayoral candidate	Vote	%
Claude Doughty (X)	3,773	
Hugh Mackenzie	3,547	
Joe Reuvekamp	399	
Gary Woodley	389	

== Lake of Bays ==
Mayoral candidate	Vote	%
Bob Young	2,223	62.92
Dan Waters	1,310	37.08

== Muskoka Lakes ==
Mayoral candidate	Vote	%
Alice Murphy	4,067	
Karen L. Ellis (X)	1,150	
Patricia A. Arney	1,084	
Larrie MacRae	437	
