= 2010 Cavite City local elections =

Philippine election

← 2007	May 10, 2010	2013 →
Nominee	Romeo Ramos	Timoteo Encarnacion Jr.	Restituto Enriquez
Party	Liberal	Nacionalista	Aksyon
Running mate		Antonio Barron	Dominador Nazareno Jr.
Popular vote	17,083	11,138	9,003
Percentage	38.18	24.89	20.12
Mayor before election
Bernardo Paredes
KAMPI
Elected mayor
Romeo Ramos
Liberal

Local elections were held in Cavite City on May 10, 2010, within the Philippine general election. Registered voters of the city elected candidates for mayor, vice mayor, and ten councilors at-large.

== Results ==
=== For Mayor ===
Outgoing Mayor Bernardo Paredes was serving his third and final term. Vice Mayor Romeo Ramos, who had contested an order by the Commission on Elections to vacate his post in 2009, was elected mayor.

Cavite City mayoral election
Party	Candidate	Votes	%
Liberal	Romeo Ramos	17,083	38.18
Nacionalista	Timoteo Encarnacion Jr.	11,138	24.89
Aksyon	Restituto Enriquez	9,003	20.12
Independent	Benjamin Rusit	5,842	13.06
Independent	Augusto Angcanan Jr.	1,678	3.75
Total votes		44,744	100.00

=== For Vice Mayor ===
Cavite City vice mayoral election
Party	Candidate	Votes	%
Nacionalista	Antonio Barron	28,049	67.17
Aksyon	Dominador Nazareno Jr.	13,707	32.83
Total votes		41,756	100.00

=== City Councilors ===
Cavite City Council election
Party	Candidate	Votes	%
Nacionalista	Edmund Tirona	22,595	6.52
Nacionalista	Percilito Consigo	21,307	6.15
Nacionalista	Denver Christopher Chua	20,546	5.93
Nacionalista	Lawrence Crawford	17,693	5.11
Nacionalista	Michael Ponsones	17,526	5.06
Nacionalista	Mark Joseph Mupas	17,115	4.94
Nacionalista	Carlo Dante Filoteo	14,848	4.29
Nacionalista	Amorico Alvarez	14,588	4.21
Nacionalista	Danna Cayetano-Cordero	14,051	4.05
Independent	Eduardo Novero Jr.	13,449	3.88
Liberal	Araceli Yap	12,234	3.53
Nacionalista	Rosauro De Guzman Jr.	11,662	3.37
Liberal	Dennis De Guzman	9,396	2.71
PMP	Fidel Dones III	7,966	2.30
Aksyon	Roberto Catalan	7,859	2.27
Liberal	Arnoldo Arellano	7,414	2.14
Aksyon	Jason Anciro	7,393	2.13
PMP	Ernest Joseph Nazareno	7,307	2.11
Aksyon	Dante Vale Cruz	6,714	1.94
PMP	Oliver Brioso	6,655	1.92
Liberal	Eduardo Perea	6,193	1.79
Independent	Ritchie Camilo	6,116	1.77
Aksyon	Virgilio Pilapil	5,865	1.69
Aksyon	Roberto Yap	5,830	1.68
Independent	Ritchlie Evaristo	5,567	1.61
PMP	Jimmy Jahnke	5,193	1.50
Aksyon	Benny Abad	5,011	1.45
Liberal	Pascual San Juan	4,968	1.43
Aksyon	Arnold Castor	4,485	1.29
Aksyon	Roberto Samala	4,155	1.20
PMP	Ramon Rodriguez	4,081	1.18
Aksyon	Arnold Mirandilla	3,912	1.13
Liberal	Ricardo San Agustin Jr.	3,512	1.01
Independent	Enrico Mateo	3,374	0.97
Liberal	Nonilon Nambayan	3,087	0.89
Independent	Susan Sabala	2,997	0.86
Independent	Kevin Kerr Ramirez	2,960	0.85
PMP	Alvin Manongsong	2,760	0.80
PMP	Joselito Parin	2,531	0.73
Independent	Victor De Leon	2,421	0.70
Aksyon	Jalpon Ruba II	1,675	0.48
PMP	Lourdes Dahay	768	0.22
Independent	Patricio Reyes	732	0.21
Total votes			
