= 2010 Maine elections =

Elections were held in Maine on November 2, 2010. Primary elections took place on June 8, 2010 for the Democratic Party, Republican Party, and Green Party.

== Federal ==
=== United States House ===
Both of Maine's seats in the United States House of Representatives were up for election in 2010. In District 1, Democratic incumbent Chellie Pingree faced Republican Dean Peter Scontras, co-owner of an alternative energy company. In District 2, Democratic incumbent Mike Michaud faced Republican Jason John Levesque, founder of direct-response marketing firm Argo Marketing.

== State ==
=== Governor ===
Incumbent Governor John Baldacci is term-limited and could not run for re-election in 2010. Republican Paul LePage narrowly beat Independent Eliot Cutler in the 5-way race.

=== State Senate ===
All 35 seats of the Maine Senate were up for election in 2010.

=== State House of Representatives ===
All 151 seats in the Maine House of Representatives were up for election in 2010.

=== Judicial positions ===
Multiple judicial positions will be up for election in 2010.

- Maine judicial elections, 2010 at Judgepedia

=== Ballot measures ===
Five measures were approved in the June 8 election. Three measures will appear on the November 2 general election ballot:
1. conservation bonds
2. dental care bonds
3. a casino in Oxford

- Maine 2010 ballot measures at Ballotpedia

== Local ==
=== County races ===
The following county offices, which vary depending on the county, are up for election in 2010: Judge of Probate, Register of Probate, County Treasurer, Register of Deeds, Sheriff, District Attorney and County Commissioner.
