= 2010 Shreveport mayoral election =

- October 2, 2010 (first round); November 2, 2010 (runoff)
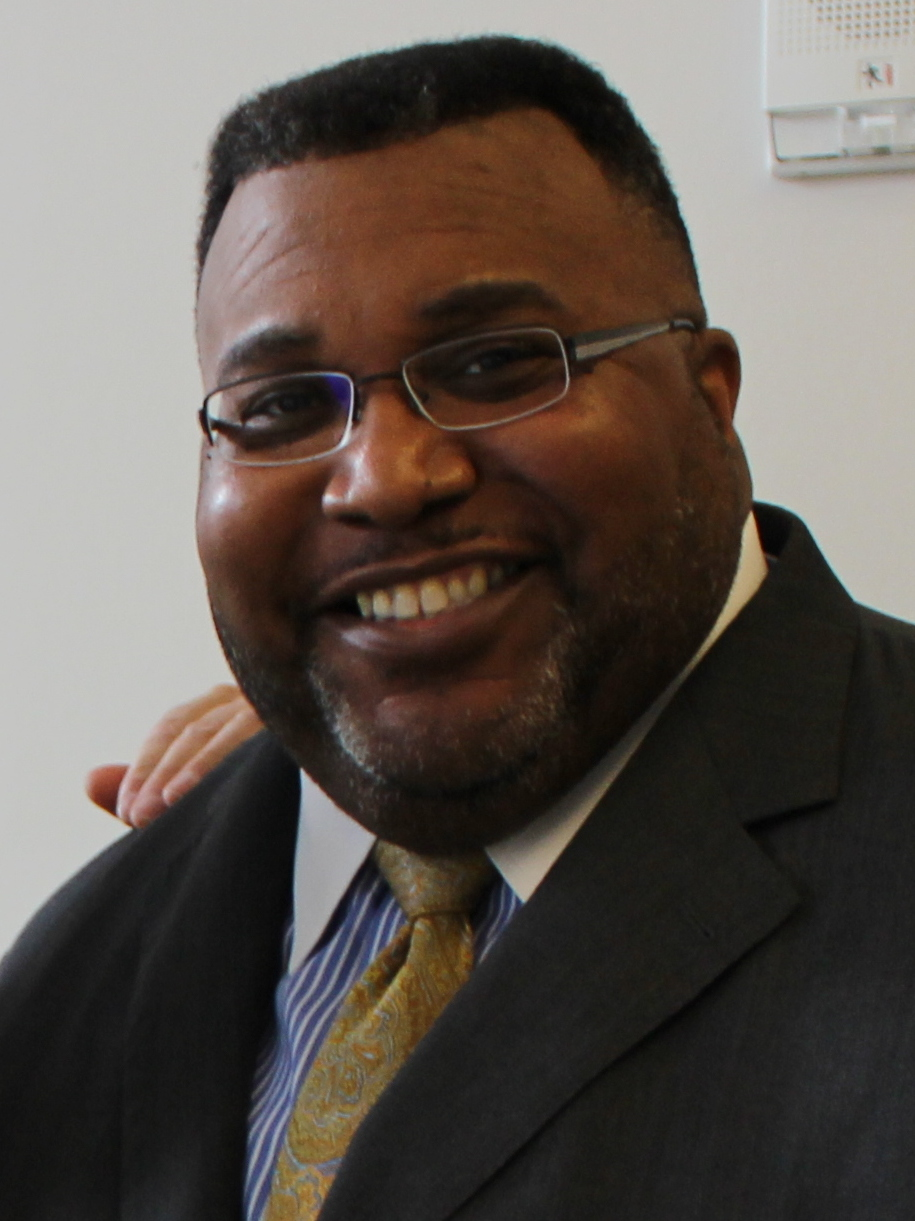

Candidate	Cedric Glover	Bryan Wooley
Party	Democratic	Republican
First round	16,390; 45.29%	11,236; 31.05%
Runoff	37,757; 64.14%	21,108; 35.86%
Candidate	Roy A. Burrell	David Cox
Party	Democratic	Independent
First round	4,722; 13.05%	2,621; 7.24%
Runoff	Eliminated	Eliminated
Mayor before election
Cedric Glover
Democratic
Elected mayor
Cedric Glover
Democratic

The 2010 Shreveport mayoral election resulted in the re-election of incumbent Democrat Cedric Glover who defeated Republican Bryan Wooley in the runoff to win a second term in office. The nonpartisan blanket primary was held on October 2, 2010, and as no candidate obtained the required majority, the general election followed on November 2, 2010.

== Results ==
2010 Mayor of Shreveport primary election
Party	Candidate	Votes	%
Democratic	Cedric Glover (incumbent)	16,390	45.29%
Republican	Bryan Wooley	11,236	31.05%
Democratic	Roy Burrell	4,722	13.05%
Independent	David Cox	2,621	7.24%
Republican	Tim Goeders	510	1.41%
Independent	Dana Bruhnke	342	0.95%
Independent	Hersy Jones Jr.	191	0.53%
Libertarian	Parker Ward	175	0.48%
Total votes		36,187	100%

2010 Mayor of Shreveport general election
Party	Candidate	Votes	%
Democratic	Cedric Glover (incumbent)	37,757	64.14%
Republican	Bryan Wooley	21,108	35.86%
Total votes		58,865	100%
