= 2010 Middlesex County municipal elections =

Local election in Ontario, Canada

Elections were held in Middlesex County, Ontario on October 25, 2010 in conjunction with municipal elections across the province.

== Middlesex County Council ==
County Council consists of the mayors of each municipality plus the deputy mayors of the municipalities over 5,000 people.

Position	Elected
Adelaide Metcalfe Mayor	David Bolton
Lucan Biddulph Mayor	Paul Hodgins
Middlesex Centre Mayor	Al Edmondson
Middlesex Centre Deputy Mayor	Clare Bloomfield
Newbury Reeve	Diane Brewer
North Middlesex Mayor	Don Shipway
North Middlesex Deputy Mayor	Chuck T. W. Hall
Southwest Middlesex Mayor	Doug Reycraft
Southwest Middlesex Deputy Mayor	Vance E. Blackmore
Strathroy Caradoc Mayor	Joanne Vanderheyden
Strathroy Caradoc Deputy Mayor	Brad Richards
Thames Centre Mayor	Jim Maudsley
Thames Centre Deputy Mayor	Marcel Meyer

== Adelaide-Metcalfe ==
Mayoral Candidate	Vote	%
David Bolton	Acclaimed	

== Lucan Biddulph ==
Mayoral Candidate	Vote	%
Paul Hodgins	774	54.8
Perry Caskanette	235	16.6
Linda C. Patterson	216	15.3
Clifford J. Waters	187	13.3

== Middlesex Centre ==
Mayoral Candidate	Vote	%
Al Edmondson (X)	2,877	
Albert F. Bannister	2,072	

== North Middlesex ==
Mayoral Candidate	Vote	%
Don Shipway	1,116	
Cheryl Norman	849	
Ian Brebner	519	

== Southwest Middlesex ==
Mayoral Candidate	Vote	%
Doug Reycraft (X)	Acclaimed	

== Strathroy-Caradoc ==
Mayoral Candidate	Vote	%
Joanne Vanderheyden	5,807	
Harold Timson	914	
John M. Harvard	245	

== Thames Centre ==
Mayoral Candidate	Vote	%
Jim Maudsley (X)	Acclaimed	

== Newbury ==
Reeve Candidate	Vote	%
Diane Brewer (X)	Acclaimed	
