= 2010 Arkansas lieutenant gubernatorial election =

- November 2, 2010

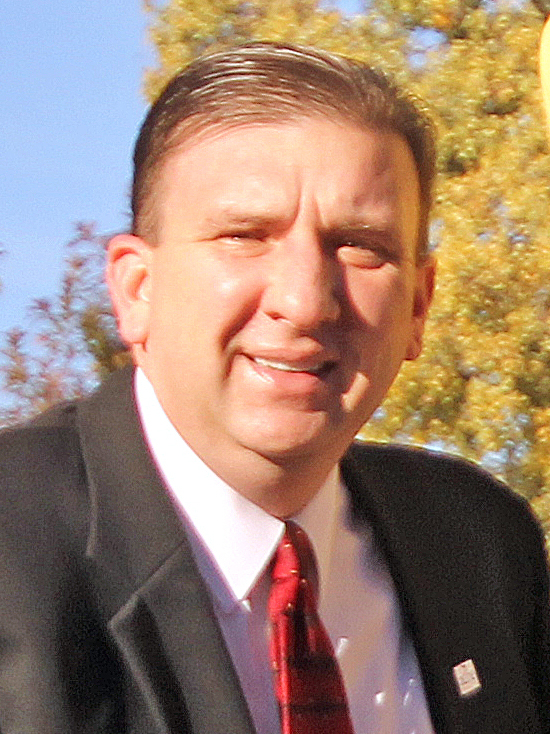
Nominee	Mark Darr	Shane Broadway
Party	Republican	Democratic
Popular vote	389,690	373,591
Percentage	51.05%	48.95%
- County results Darr: 50–60% 60–70% 70–80% Broadway: 50–60% 60–70% 70–80%
Lieutenant Governor before election
Bill Halter
Democratic
Elected Lieutenant Governor
Mark Darr
Republican

The 2010 Arkansas lieutenant gubernatorial election was held on November 2, 2010, to elect the Lieutenant Governor of Arkansas, concurrently with elections to the United States Senate, U.S. House of Representatives, governor, and other state and local elections. Primary elections were held on May 18, 2010.

Incumbent Democratic lieutenant governor Bill Halter was eligible to seek re-election to a second term in office, but instead unsuccessfully ran in the Democratic primary for Arkansas's Class III U.S. Senate seat, losing to incumbent senator Blanche Lincoln in a runoff election. Restaurant owner Mark Darr narrowly defeated state legislator Shane Broadway in the general election, flipping party control of the office.

Darr resigned on February 1, 2014, following the discovery of improper use of state campaign funds and threats of impeachment by the state legislature. A special election to replace Darr would have been required under state law, but governor Mike Beebe signed Senate Bill 139 into law on February 28, 2014, allowing the office to remain vacant until the regularly scheduled general election later that year.

== Democratic primary ==
=== Candidates ===
==== Nominee ====
- Shane Broadway, state senator from the 22nd district (2003–2011) and former speaker of the Arkansas House of Representatives (2001–2003) from the 46th district (1997–2003)

==== Declined ====
- Bill Halter, incumbent lieutenant governor (2007–2011) and former acting commissioner of the Social Security Administration (2001) (ran for U.S. Senate)

=== Endorsements ===
Shane Broadway

Organizations

- Arkansas Realtors Association

=== Results ===
Democratic primary results
Party	Candidate	Votes	%
Democratic	Shane Broadway	Unopposed	
Total votes		—N/a	100.0

== Republican primary ==
=== Candidates ===
==== Nominee ====
- Mark Darr, restaurant owner

==== Eliminated in primary ====
- Donnie Copeland, pastor

=== Results ===
Republican primary results
Party	Candidate	Votes	%
Republican	Mark Darr	64,883	51.93
Republican	Donnie Copeland	60,072	48.07
Total votes		124,955	100.0

== General election ==
=== Post-primary endorsements ===
Shane Broadway (D)

Labor unions

- International Brotherhood of Boilermakers

Newspapers and other media

- Arkansas Times

Organizations

- NRA Political Victory Fund

=== Results ===
2010 Arkansas lieutenant gubernatorial election
Party	Candidate	Votes	%
Republican	Mark Darr	389,690	51.05
Democratic	Shane Broadway	373,591	48.95
Total votes		763,281	100.0
Republican gain from Democratic			
