= 2010 United States House of Representatives election in Wyoming =

2010 United States House of Representatives election in Wyoming's at-large district
- November 2, 2010
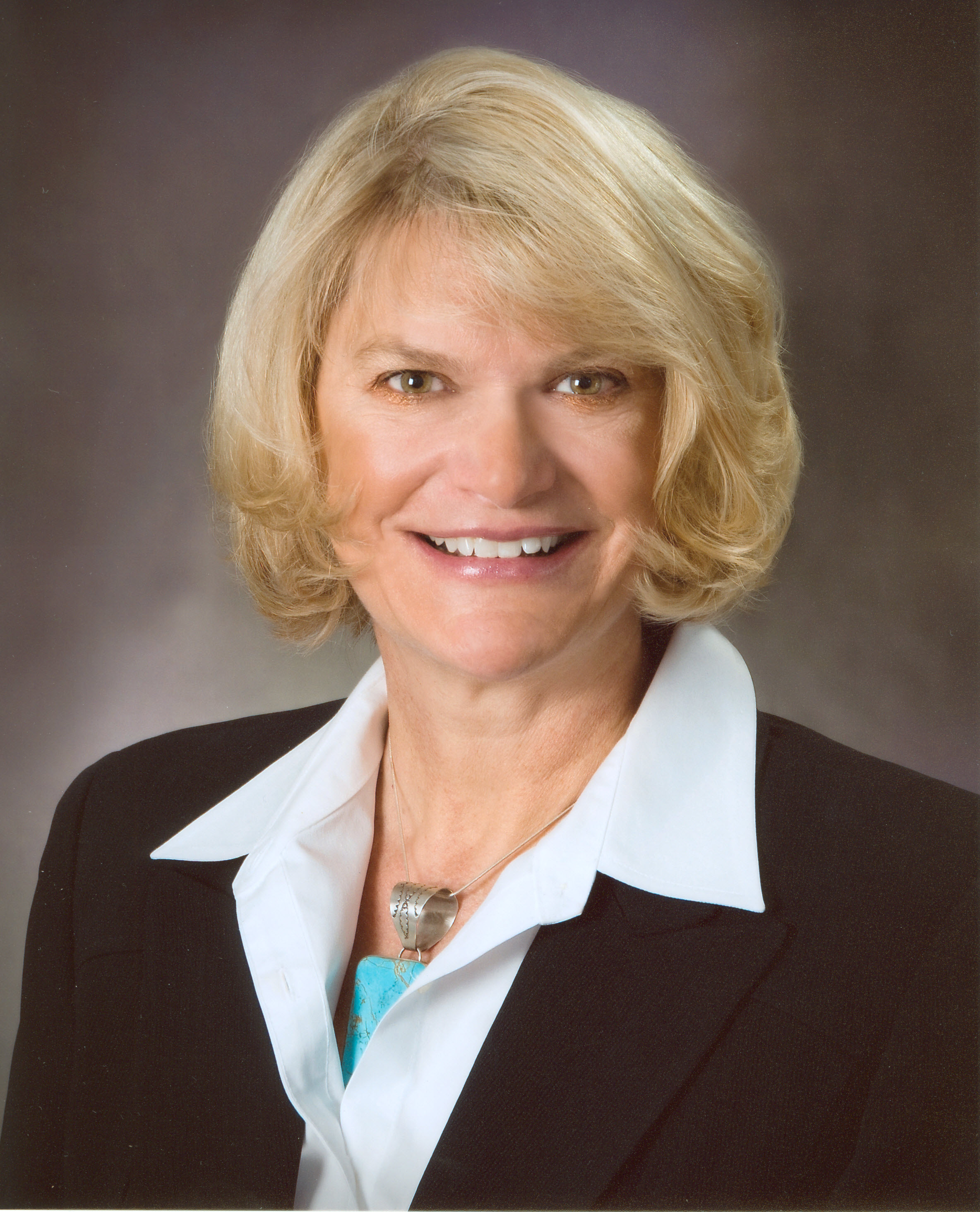

Nominee	Cynthia Lummis	David Wendt
Party	Republican	Democratic
Popular vote	131,661	45,768
Percentage	70.42%	24.48%
- County results Lummis: 50–60% 60–70% 70–80% 80–90% Wendt: 40–50%
U.S. Representative before election
Cynthia Lummis
Republican
Elected U.S. Representative
Cynthia Lummis
Republican

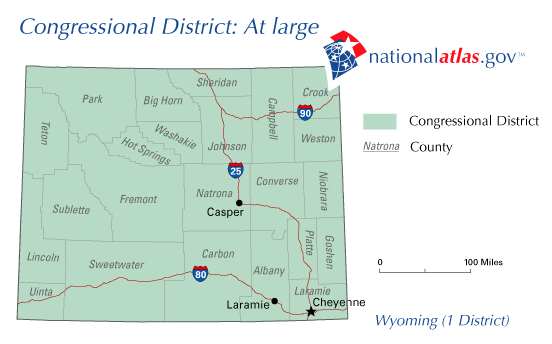

The 2010 United States House of Representatives election in Wyoming was held on November 2, 2010, and determined who would represent the state of Wyoming in the United States House of Representatives. Representatives are elected for two-year terms; the elected served in Congress from 2011 to 2013. The election coincided with the 2010 midterm elections.

Wyoming has one seat in the House, apportioned according to the 2000 United States census. Its 2008-2010 congressional House delegation consisted of one Republican.

== Democratic primary ==
=== Candidates ===
- David Wendt, Director of the Jackson Hole Center for Global Affairs

=== Results ===
Democratic Party primary results
Party	Candidate	Votes	%
Democratic	David Wendt	20,410	99.04
Democratic	Write-ins	198	0.96
Total votes		20,608	100.00

== Republican primary ==
=== Candidates ===
- Cynthia Lummis, incumbent Congresswoman
- Evan Liam Slafter

=== Results ===
Republican primary results
Party	Candidate	Votes	%
Republican	Cynthia Lummis (incumbent)	84,063	82.82
Republican	Evan Liam Slafter	17,148	16.89
Republican	Write-ins	289	0.28
Total votes		101,500	100.00

== General election ==
=== Candidates ===
- Cynthia Lummis, incumbent Congresswoman (R)
- David Wendt, Director of the Jackson Hole Center for Global Affairs (D)
- John V. Love (L)

=== Polling ===
Poll Source	Dates Administered	Cynthia Lummis (R)	David Wendt (D)
Rasmussen Reports	September 30, 2010	61%	29%
Mason-Dixon	July 26–28, 2010	59%	29%

==== Predictions ====
Source	Ranking	As of
The Cook Political Report	Safe R	November 1, 2010
Rothenberg	Safe R	November 1, 2010
Sabato's Crystal Ball	Safe R	November 1, 2010
RCP	Safe R	November 1, 2010
CQ Politics	Safe R	October 28, 2010
New York Times	Safe R	November 1, 2010
FiveThirtyEight	Safe R	November 1, 2010

=== Results ===
Wyoming's at-large congressional district election, 2010
Party	Candidate	Votes	%
Republican	Cynthia Lummis (incumbent)	131,661	70.42
Democratic	David Wendt	45,768	24.48
Libertarian	John V. Love	9,253	4.95
Write-ins		287	0.15
Total votes		186,969	100.00
Republican hold			

==== Counties that flipped from Democratic to Republican ====
- Albany (Largest city: Laramie)
- Sweetwater (Largest city: Rock Springs)
- Laramie (Largest city: Cheyenne)

== See also ==
- Wyoming's at-large congressional district
- 2010 Wyoming elections

Preceded by 2008 elections	United States House elections in Wyoming; 2010	Succeeded by 2012 elections
