= 2010 Washington elections =

Elections were held in Washington on Tuesday, November 2, 2010. Primary elections were held on August 17, 2010.

== Federal ==
=== United States Senate ===
Incumbent Democratic Senator Patty Murray won re-election to her fourth term in office, defeating Republican challenger Dino Rossi by five points.

=== United States House ===
All of Washington's nine seats in the United States House of Representatives were up for election. All but one incumbent ran for re-election, with the exception being Brian Baird (D) of the 3rd District, who retired. Baird's seat was won by Jaime Herrera Beutler (R), while incumbents won re-election in all eight other seats.

== Statewide ==
=== State Supreme Court ===
Three positions on the Washington Supreme Court were up for election in 2010. James M. Johnson and Barbara Madsen won re-election uncontested, while Charles K. Wiggins defeated incumbent Richard B. Sanders by less than 1% of the vote.

=== Ballot measures ===
Nine statewide ballot measures were certified for the November 2, 2010 statewide ballot.

== Legislative ==
=== State Senate ===
Twenty-five of the forty-nine seats in the Washington State Senate were up for election. Despite early leads from several Republican challengers, Democrats ultimately retained control of the Senate, winning fifteen races.

=== State House of Representatives ===
All of the seats in the Washington House of Representatives were up for election in 2010. Republicans gained five seats in the election, leading to a spread of 56 Democrats and 42 Republicans in the State House.
