= 2002 West Lancashire District Council election =

2002 UK local government election

Results of the 2002 West Lancashire District Council election

The 2002 West Lancashire District Council election took place on 2 May 2002 to elect members of West Lancashire District Council in Lancashire, England. The whole council was up for election with boundary changes since the last election in 2000 reducing the number of seats by 1. The Conservative Party gained overall control of the council from Labour.

After the election the composition of the council was:

Party	Seats	±
Conservative	30	+8
Labour	24	-7
Independent	0	-2

== Campaign ==
Before the election Labour had 25 seats on the council, compared to 23 for the Conservatives. All the seats were being contested for the first time since 1974 after boundary changes had taken place. Among the candidates there was a record number of independents at 12, with 6 of them having defected from Labour.

Issues in the election including transport, housing and leisure facilities. The Labour Party said they were the only party that had the experience to run the council and pledged to remove charges for pensioners for pest control. However the Conservatives pledged to improve services, increase recycling, keep parking charges low, form partnerships with private firms to improve facilities, while making efficiency savings.

== Election result ==
The results saw the Conservatives gain control of the council after winning 30 seats compared to 24 for Labour. The Conservatives won the seats in Ormskirk, while Labour held the seats in Skelmersdale. However the former Labour chairman of the council, Andrew Johnson, was defeated in the election in Aughton and Downholland ward after his former seat of Downholland was merged with the more Conservative Aughton in the boundary changes. All of the independent candidates were defeated in the election, which saw an overall turnout of 32.5%.

West Lancashire local election result 2002
Party	Seats	Gains	Losses	Net gain/loss	Seats %	Votes %	Votes	+/−
Conservative	30			+8	55.6	47.5	26,397	
Labour	24			-8	44.4	40.0	22,256	
Independent	0			-2	0	11.5	6,378	
Green	0			0	0	0.8	454	
Socialist Alliance	0			0	0	0.2	93	

== Ward results ==
=== Ashurst ===
Ashurst (3)
Party	Candidate	Votes	%	±%
Labour	Ian Duffy	728		
Labour	Donna Duffy	726		
Labour	Ann Rice	656		
Independent	Marie McElhinney	382		
Independent	Patrick McElhinney	349		
Conservative	James Coomber	219		
Socialist Alliance	Lyndsey Shipstone	93		
Turnout		3,153		

=== Aughton and Downholland ===
Aughton and Downholland (3)
Party	Candidate	Votes	%	±%
Conservative	David O'Toole	1,085		
Conservative	Una Atherley	1,069		
Conservative	David Westley	985		
Labour	Andrew Johnson	780		
Turnout		3,919		

=== Aughton Park ===
Aughton Park (2)
Party	Candidate	Votes	%	±%
Conservative	Ian Grant	879		
Conservative	Geoffrey Roberts	790		
Labour	Gordon Rankin	322		
Turnout		1,991		

=== Bickerstaffe ===
Bickerstaffe (1)
Party	Candidate	Votes	%	±%
Conservative	Patricia Taylor	440	62.2	
Labour	Paul Cotterill	267	37.8	
Majority		173	24.4	
Turnout		707		

=== Birch Green ===
Birch Green (2)
Party	Candidate	Votes	%	±%
Labour	Mary Pendleton	410		
Labour	Jane Roberts	320		
Independent	John Hiley	165		
Conservative	Florence Kean	56		
Turnout		951		

=== Burscough East ===
Burscough East (2)
Party	Candidate	Votes	%	±%
Labour	Walter Carter	582		
Conservative	Florence Westley	582		
Labour	Anne Carter	580		
Conservative	Susan Murrin-Bailey	546		
Turnout		2,290		

=== Burscough West ===
Burscough West (2)
Party	Candidate	Votes	%	±%
Labour	John Draper	732		
Labour	Cynthia Dereli	713		
Conservative	Richard Shepherd	633		
Conservative	Graham Rhys Jones	607		
Turnout		2,685		

=== Derby ===
Derby (3)
Party	Candidate	Votes	%	±%
Conservative	Paul Greenall	811		
Conservative	Adrian Owens	750		
Conservative	David Swiffen	734		
Labour	Noel Delaney	610		
Labour	Elizabeth Rafferty	571		
Green	Anne Doyle	321		
Turnout		3,797		

=== Digmoor ===
Digmoor (2)
Party	Candidate	Votes	%	±%
Labour	Terence Aldridge	609		
Labour	Anne Maguire	461		
Independent	Ian Givens	139		
Conservative	Malcolm Barron	85		
Turnout		1,294		

=== Halsall ===
Halsall (1)
Party	Candidate	Votes	%	±%
Conservative	Doreen Stephenson	431	73.8	
Labour	Dorothy Rimmer	153	26.2	
Majority		278	47.6	
Turnout		584		

=== Hesketh-with-Becconsall ===
Hesketh-with-Becconsall (2)
Party	Candidate	Votes	%	±%
Conservative	Christopher Ashcroft	607		
Conservative	Martin Forshaw	592		
Independent	Gail Hodson	295		
Independent	Lesley Standish-Gore	285		
Labour	Susan Jones	113		
Turnout		1,892		

=== Knowsley ===
Knowsley (3)
Party	Candidate	Votes	%	±%
Conservative	Valerie Hopley	1,059		
Conservative	Peter Lea	1,010		
Conservative	Robert Bailey	913		
Labour	Margaret Pinnington	635		
Labour	Richard Nolan	541		
Turnout		4,158		

=== Moorside ===
Moorside (2)
Party	Candidate	Votes	%	±%
Labour	Patricia Carson	423		
Labour	Susan Riley	415		
Independent	Ronald Ford	144		
Independent	Karl Taraldsen	128		
Turnout		1,110		

=== Newburgh ===
Newburgh (1)
Party	Candidate	Votes	%	±%
Conservative	Kenneth Vincent	533	72.2	
Labour	Jacqueline Citarella	205	27.8	
Majority		328	44.4	
Turnout		738		

=== North Meols ===
North Meols (2)
Party	Candidate	Votes	%	±%
Conservative	John Baldock	549		
Conservative	Jill Baldock	548		
Independent	Joan Draper	383		
Labour	Shan France	304		
Turnout		1,784		

=== Parbold ===
Parbold (2)
Party	Candidate	Votes	%	±%
Conservative	William Waterworth	935		
Conservative	May Blake	920		
Labour	David McKay	305		
Turnout		2,160		

=== Rufford ===
Rufford (1)
Party	Candidate	Votes	%	±%
Conservative	Joan Colling	374	75.3	
Labour	Christopher Cheetham	123	24.7	
Majority		251	50.6	
Turnout		497		

=== Scarisbrick ===
Scarisbrick (2)
Party	Candidate	Votes	%	±%
Conservative	William Cropper	755		
Conservative	Margaret Edwards	695		
Labour	Paul Gray	281		
Turnout		1,731		

=== Scott ===
Scott (3)
Party	Candidate	Votes	%	±%
Labour	Charles Gains	722		
Labour	Francis Williams	710		
Conservative	Cyril Ainscough	656		
Labour	John Hodson	636		
Conservative	Leslie Yeates	587		
Independent	John Fillis	463		
Independent	David Braid	187		
Turnout		3,961		

=== Skelmersdale North ===
Skelmersdale North (2)
Party	Candidate	Votes	%	±%
Labour	Alan Bullen	514		
Labour	Jane McDermott	498		
Independent	Joan Morrison	368		
Independent	Alan Spears	301		
Turnout		1,681		

=== Skelmersdale South ===
Skelmersdale South (3)
Party	Candidate	Votes	%	±%
Labour	Richard Cavanagh	754		
Labour	Sydney Jones	728		
Labour	Doreen Saxon	703		
Independent	Joan Britton	520		
Independent	Sharon Wright	329		
Conservative	Susan Cropper	140		
Green	Martin Lowe	133		
Turnout		3,307		

=== Tanhouse ===
Tanhouse (2)
Party	Candidate	Votes	%	±%
Labour	Robert Pendleton	374		
Labour	William Roberts	321		
Independent	David Gibson	163		
Conservative	Irene O'Donnell	129		
Turnout		987		

=== Tarleton ===
Tarleton (3)
Party	Candidate	Votes	%	±%
Conservative	Robert Hodge	986		
Conservative	John Mee	939		
Conservative	Rosemary Evans	833		
Independent	John Hodson	625		
Independent	Roy Hiscock	583		
Independent	Nadine Ashcroft	569		
Labour	Denise Francis	131		
Turnout		4,666		

=== Up Holland ===
Up Holland (3)
Party	Candidate	Votes	%	±%
Labour	Barbara Burke	940		
Labour	Margaret Skilling	837		
Labour	Anthony Rice	796		
Conservative	Ruth Pollock	615		
Turnout		3,188		

=== Wrightington ===
Wrightington (2)
Party	Candidate	Votes	%	±%
Conservative	Peter Gartside	661		
Conservative	Carolyn Evans	659		
Labour	Derek Thompson	542		
Labour	David Phythian	485		
Turnout		2,347		
