= 2010 Elgin County municipal elections =

Local election in Ontario, Canada

Elections were held in Elgin County, Ontario on October 25, 2010 in conjunction with municipal elections across the province.

== Elgin County Council ==
Position	Elected
Aylmer Mayor	Jack Couckuyt
Bayham Mayor	Paul L. Ens
Central Elgin Mayor	Bill Walters
Central Elgin Deputy Mayor	David Marr
Dutton/Dunwich Mayor	Bonnie Vowel
Malahide Mayor	Dave Mennhill
Malahide Deputy Mayor	Jim Jenkins
Southwold Mayor	James McIntyre
West Elgin Mayor	Bernie Wiehle

== Aylmer ==
Mayoral Candidate	Vote	%
Jack Couckuyt	776	
Bob Habkirk (X)	340	
Ted McDonald	336	
Mary French	231	

== Bayham ==
Mayoral Candidate	Vote	%
Paul L. Ens	785	
Bob Lozon	709	

== Central Elgin ==
Mayoral Candidate	Vote	%
Bill Walters	2,065	
Tom Marks (X)	1,226	
John Robinson	652	
Gordon Smith	455	

== Dutton/Dunwich ==
Mayoral Candidate	Vote	%
Bonnie Vowel (X)	Acclaimed	

== Malahide ==
Mayoral Candidate	Vote	%
Dave Mennhill	1,848	
John R. Wilson (X)	1,120	

== Southwold ==
Mayoral Candidate	Vote	%
James McIntyre (X)	681	
Valerie Cron	614	
Bill Aarts	471	

== West Elgin ==
Mayoral Candidate	Vote	%
Bernie Wiehle	1,102	
Jonathan Wolf	572	
Trudy Balint	461	
