= 2010 American Samoan general election =

- November 2, 2010
- U.S. House delegate
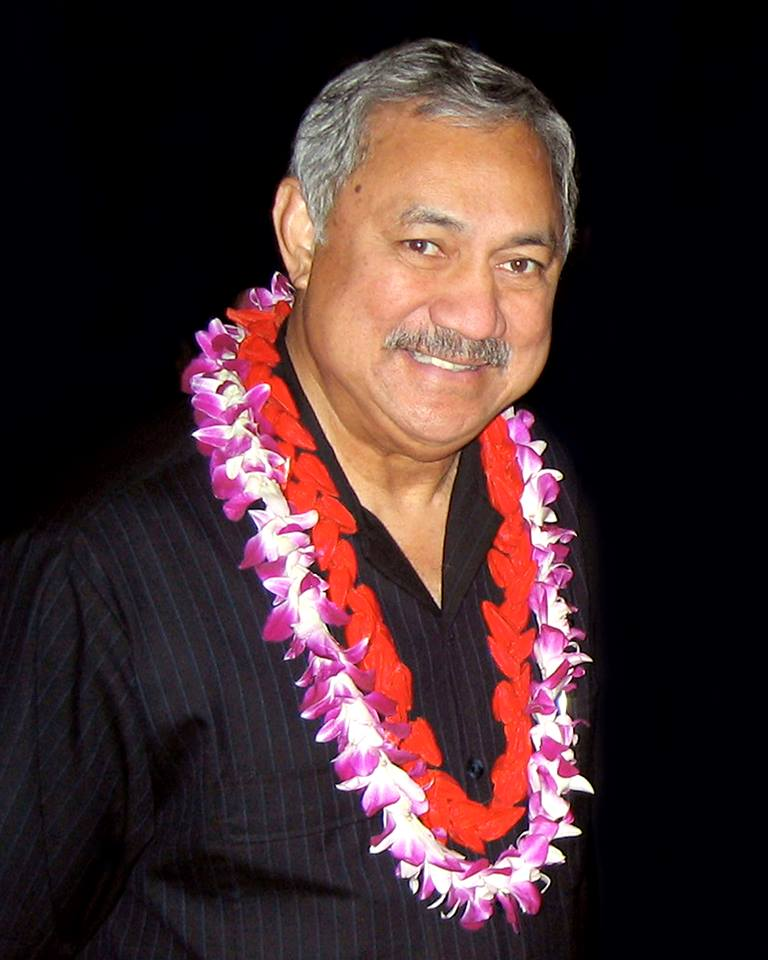

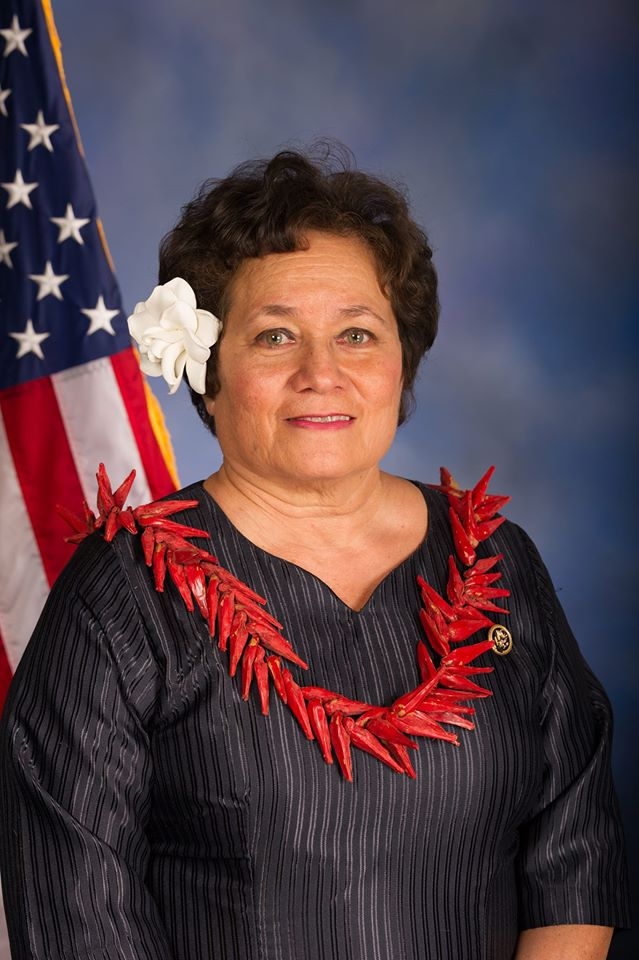
Candidate	Eni Faleomavaega	Amata Coleman Radewagen
Party	Democratic	Republican
Popular vote	6,182	4,422
Percentage	56.41%	40.35%
Delegate before election
Eni Faleomavaega
Democratic
Elected Delegate
Eni Faleomavaega
Democratic

General elections were held in American Samoa on November 2, 2010. The deadline to register as a candidate for the election was September 1, 2010.

Voters in American Samoa chose the 20 elected members of the American Samoa House of Representatives. Voters also cast their ballots for the federal Delegate to the United States House of Representatives in Washington, D.C., and proposed revisions to the American Samoan Constitution.

Incumbent Eni Faleomavaega of the Democratic Party, who had held the seat since 1989, was re-elected as the U.S. House delegate.

== Results ==
=== House of Representatives ===
Voters chose 20 elected members of the American Samoa House of Representatives. Six incumbent representatives lost their re-election bids.

=== Delegate to the U.S. House of Representatives ===
All elections in American Samoa are officially non-partisan, though candidates do identify with a particular political party. Three candidates sought election for Delegate to the U.S. House in 2010.

Incumbent Rep. Eni Faleomavaega, who identifies with the Democratic Party, is seeking re-election. He was re-elected in the 2008 House election with 60% of the vote.

Amata Coleman Radewagen, American Samoa's Republican National Committeewoman who has challenged Faleomavaega in the past, ran again for the seat.

Tuika Tuika, an accountant and former candidate for Governor of American Samoa in the 2008 gubernatorial election, is the third candidate in the election.

In early February 2010, independent Fualaau Rosie Tago Lancaster had announced that she would seek second bid to become American Samoa's delegate to the United States House. Lancaster announced that she will run on a platform promising an emphasis on Veterans issues, better communication and transportation links with the Manu'a Islands, education, healthcare and economic development. Lancaster came in third in the 2008 House election, receiving 5% of the popular vote. However, she did not appear on the general election ballot in November.

Faleomavaega was elected for a twelfth two-year term in office, taking 6,895 ballots, or 56% of the vote.

Candidate	Party	Votes	%
Eni Faleomavaega	Democratic Party	6,182	56.41
Amata Coleman Radewagen	Republican Party	4,422	40.35
Tuika Tuika	Independent	356	3.25
Total		10,960	100.00

== Referendum ==
Voters decided if the amendments and revisions to the Constitution of American Samoa which were proposed at the 2010 Constitutional Convention should be adopted. The government announced how many new amendments to the Constitution would be presented to the territory's voters.

Voters strongly rejected the proposed amendments to the Constitution, with 7,660 (70.17%) voting against the changes to 3,257 (29.83%) who voted yes. Voters rejected the amendments to the Constitution in all 17 electoral districts of American Samoa as well as in the absentee ballot poll.
