= 2010 United Kingdom local elections =

- 6 May 2010

All 32 London boroughs, all 36 metropolitan boroughs, 20 out of 55 unitary authorities, 76 out of 212 district councils, and 4 directly elected mayors

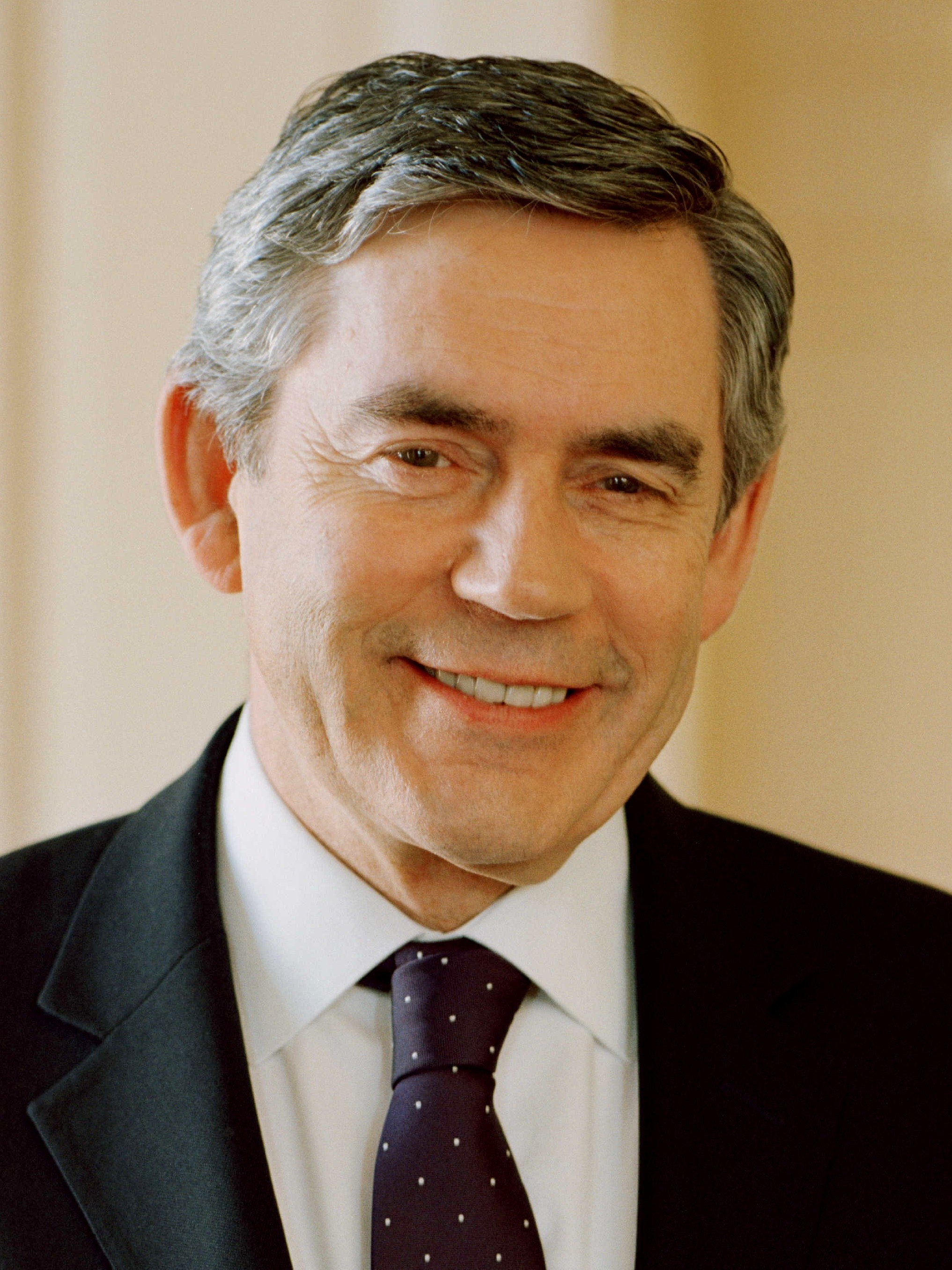

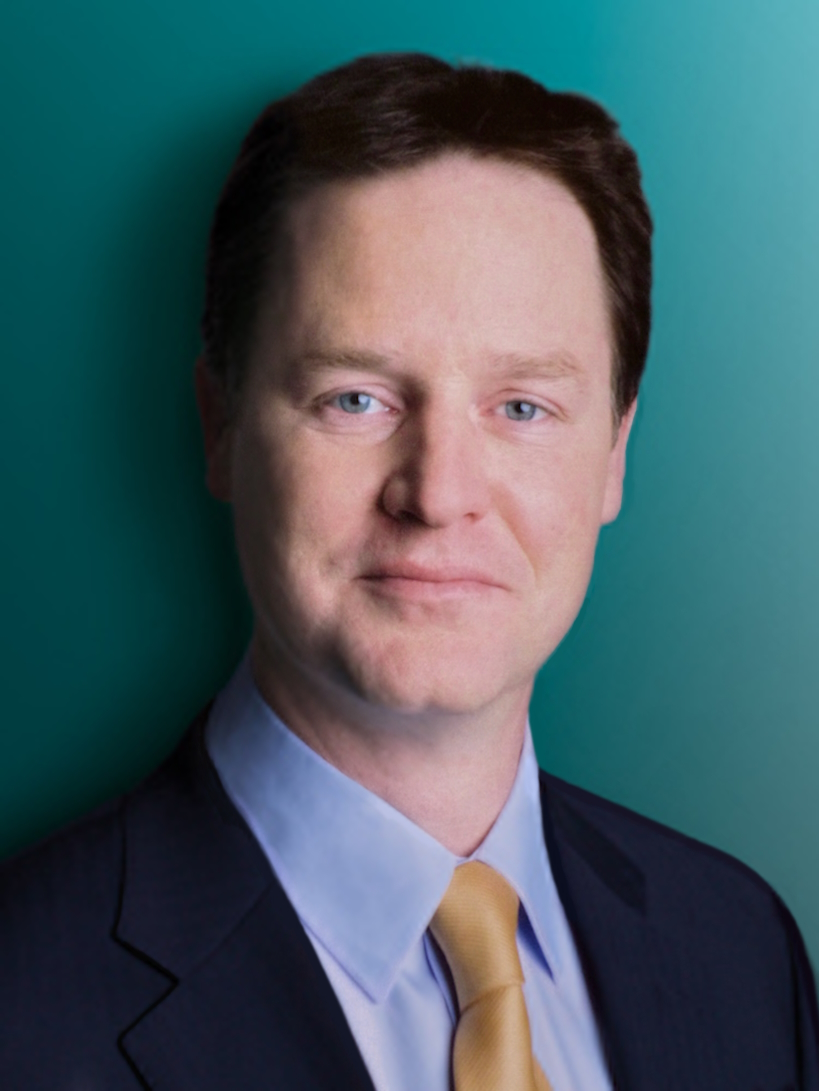
	First party	Second party	Third party
Leader	David Cameron	Gordon Brown	Nick Clegg
Party	Conservative	Labour	Liberal Democrats
Leader since	6 December 2005	24 June 2007	18 December 2007
Percentage	35%	27%	26%
Swing	▼4%	▲1%	▲1%
Councils	66	37	14
Councils +/–	▼4	▲17	▼4
Councillors	3,462	2,976	1,730
Councillors +/–	▼121	▲417	▼132
- Colours denote the winning party, as shown in the main table of results.

The 2010 United Kingdom local elections were held on Thursday 6 May 2010, concurrently with the 2010 general election. Direct elections were held to all 32 London boroughs, all 36 metropolitan boroughs, 76 second-tier district authorities, 20 unitary authorities and various Mayoral posts, all in England. For those authorities elected "all out" these were the first elections since 2006.

The results provided some comfort to the Labour Party, losing the general election on the same day, as it was the first time Conservative councillor numbers declined since 1996.

== Results ==
Party	Councillors		Councils	
Party	Number	Change	Number	Change
Conservative	3,462	▼121	66	▼4
Labour	2,976	▲417	37	▲17
Liberal Democrats	1,730	▼132	14	▼4
Residents	63	Steady	0	Steady
Green	36	▼8	0	Steady
BNP	19	▼27	0	Steady
Liberal	15	▼1	0	Steady
UKIP	9	▼4	0	Steady
Others	298	▼117	0	Steady
No overall control	n/a	n/a	47	▼7

== London boroughs ==
Mapped results for London Boroughs

All seats in the 32 London Boroughs were up for election.

Council	Previous control	Result	Details
Barking and Dagenham	Labour	Labour hold	Details
Barnet	Conservative	Conservative hold	Details
Bexley	Conservative	Conservative hold	Details
Brent	No overall control	Labour gain	Details
Bromley	Conservative	Conservative hold	Details
Camden	No overall control	Labour gain	Details
Croydon	Conservative	Conservative hold	Details
Ealing	Conservative	Labour gain	Details
Enfield	Conservative	Labour gain	Details
Greenwich	Labour	Labour hold	Details
Hackney	Labour	Labour hold	Details
Hammersmith and Fulham	Conservative	Conservative hold	Details
Haringey	Labour	Labour hold	Details
Harrow	Conservative	Labour gain	Details
Havering	Conservative	Conservative hold	Details
Hillingdon	Conservative	Conservative hold	Details
Hounslow	No overall control	Labour gain	Details
Islington	No overall control	Labour gain	Details
Kensington and Chelsea	Conservative	Conservative hold	Details
Kingston upon Thames	Liberal Democrats	Liberal Democrats hold	Details
Lambeth	Labour	Labour hold	Details
Lewisham	No overall control	Labour gain	Details
Merton	No overall control	No overall control hold	Details
Newham	Labour	Labour hold	Details
Redbridge	No overall control	No overall control hold	Details
Richmond upon Thames	Liberal Democrats	Conservative gain	Details
Southwark	No overall control	Labour gain	Details
Sutton	Liberal Democrats	Liberal Democrats hold	Details
Tower Hamlets	Labour	Labour hold	Details
Waltham Forest	No overall control	Labour gain	Details
Wandsworth	Conservative	Conservative hold	Details
Westminster	Conservative	Conservative hold	Details

== Metropolitan boroughs ==
Map showing results for the 32 London Boroughs, 36 Metropolitan Boroughs and 20 unitary authorities where seats were contested.

One third of the seats in all 36 Metropolitan Boroughs were up for election.

Council	Previous control	Result	Details
Barnsley	Labour	Labour hold	Details
Birmingham	No overall control	No overall control hold	Details
Bolton	No overall control	No overall control hold	Details
Bradford	No overall control	No overall control hold	Details
Bury	Conservative	No overall control gain	Details
Calderdale	No overall control	No overall control hold	Details
Coventry	No overall control	Labour gain	Details
Doncaster	No overall control	Labour gain	Details
Dudley	Conservative	Conservative hold	Details
Gateshead	Labour	Labour hold	Details
Kirklees	No overall control	No overall control hold	Details
Knowsley	Labour	Labour hold	Details
Leeds	No overall control	No overall control hold	Details
Liverpool	Liberal Democrats	Labour gain	Details
Manchester	Labour	Labour hold	Details
Newcastle upon Tyne	Liberal Democrats	Liberal Democrats hold	Details
North Tyneside	Conservative	No overall control gain	Details
Oldham	No overall control	No overall control hold	Details
Rochdale	Liberal Democrats	No overall control gain	Details
Rotherham	Labour	Labour hold	Details
St. Helens	No overall control	Labour gain	Details
Salford	Labour	Labour hold	Details
Sandwell	Labour	Labour hold	Details
Sefton	No overall control	No overall control hold	Details
Sheffield	Liberal Democrats	No overall control gain	Details
Solihull	Conservative	No overall control gain	Details
South Tyneside	Labour	Labour hold	Details
Stockport	Liberal Democrats	Liberal Democrats hold	Details
Sunderland	Labour	Labour hold	Details
Tameside	Labour	Labour hold	Details
Trafford	Conservative	Conservative hold	Details
Wakefield	Labour	Labour hold	Details
Walsall	Conservative	Conservative hold	Details
Wigan	Labour	Labour hold	Details
Wirral	No overall control	No overall control hold	Details
Wolverhampton	No overall control	No overall control hold	Details

== Unitary authorities ==
One third of the council seats were up for election in 20 unitary authorities.

Council	Previous control	New Control	Details
Blackburn with Darwen	No overall control	No overall control	Details
Bristol	Liberal Democrats	Liberal Democrats	Details
Derby	No overall control	No overall control	Details
Halton	Labour	Labour	Details
Hartlepool	No overall control	Labour	Details
Kingston upon Hull	Liberal Democrats	Liberal Democrats	Details
Milton Keynes	No overall control	No overall control	Details
North East Lincolnshire	No overall control	No overall control	Details
Peterborough	Conservative	Conservative	Details
Plymouth	Conservative	Conservative	Details
Portsmouth	No overall control	Liberal Democrats	Details
Reading	No overall control	No overall control	Details
Slough	Labour	Labour	Details
Southampton	Conservative	Conservative	Details
Southend-on-Sea	Conservative	Conservative	Details
Stoke-on-Trent	No overall control	No overall control	Details
Swindon	Conservative	Conservative	Details
Thurrock	No overall control	No overall control	Details
Warrington	No overall control	No overall control	Details
Wokingham	Conservative	Conservative	Details

The elections in Stoke-on-Trent had originally been cancelled following a referendum result which decided to abolish the existing Mayor and Cabinet system of governance, with replacement elections to take place in 2011 following a review of the council by the Boundary Committee for England. However, it was later decided to hold elections to one-third of the council in 2010 as planned.

== Non-metropolitan districts ==
The elections that were due to be held in Exeter and Norwich were cancelled due to structural changes. Following the 2010 general election, the structural changes were cancelled, leading to elections in both cities in September 2010 (see 2010 Exeter City Council election and 2010 Norwich City Council election).

=== Half of council ===
Seven district councils had half of their seats up for election.

Council	Previous control	New Control	Details
Adur	Conservative	Conservative	Details
Cheltenham	No overall control	Liberal Democrats	Details
Fareham	Conservative	Conservative	Details
Gosport	No overall control	Conservative	Details
Hastings	No overall control	Labour	Details
Nuneaton and Bedworth	Conservative	No overall control	Details
Oxford	No overall control	Labour	Details

=== Third of council ===
69 district councils had one third of their seats up for election.

Council	Previous control	New Control	Details
Amber Valley	Conservative	Conservative	Details
Barrow-in-Furness	No overall control	No overall control	Details
Basildon	Conservative	Conservative	Details
Basingstoke and Deane	Conservative	Conservative	Details
Bassetlaw	Conservative	Conservative	Details
Brentwood	Conservative	Conservative	Details
Broxbourne	Conservative	Conservative	Details
Burnley	Liberal Democrats	Liberal Democrats	Details
Cambridge	Liberal Democrats	Liberal Democrats	Details
Cannock Chase	No overall control	No overall control	Details
Carlisle	No overall control	No overall control	Details
Castle Point	Conservative	Conservative	Details
Cherwell	Conservative	Conservative	Details
Chorley	Conservative	Conservative	Details
Colchester	No overall control	No overall control	Details
Craven	No overall control	Conservative	Details
Crawley	Conservative	Conservative	Details
Daventry	Conservative	Conservative	Details
Eastleigh	Liberal Democrats	Liberal Democrats	Details
Elmbridge	Conservative	Conservative	Details
Epping Forest	Conservative	Conservative	Details
Gloucester	No overall control	No overall control	Details
Great Yarmouth	Conservative	Conservative	Details
Harlow	Conservative	Conservative	Details
Harrogate	No overall control	Conservative	Details
Hart	No overall control	Conservative	Details
Havant	Conservative	Conservative	Details
Hertsmere	Conservative	Conservative	Details
Huntingdonshire	Conservative	Conservative	Details
Hyndburn	Conservative	No overall control	Details
Ipswich	No overall control	No overall control	Details
Lincoln	Conservative	No overall control	Details
Maidstone	Conservative	Conservative	Details
Mole Valley	Conservative	No overall control	Details
Newcastle-under-Lyme	No overall control	No overall control	Details
North Hertfordshire	Conservative	Conservative	Details
Pendle	No overall control	No overall control	Details
Preston	No overall control	No overall control	Details
Purbeck	No overall control	No overall control	Details
Redditch	Conservative	Conservative	Details
Reigate and Banstead	Conservative	Conservative	Details
Rochford	Conservative	Conservative	Details
Rossendale	Conservative	Conservative	Details
Rugby	Conservative	Conservative	Details
Runnymede	Conservative	Conservative	Details
Rushmoor	Conservative	Conservative	Details
St Albans	Liberal Democrats	Liberal Democrats	Details
South Cambridgeshire	Conservative	Conservative	Details
South Lakeland	Liberal Democrats	Liberal Democrats	Details
Stevenage	Labour	Labour	Details
Stratford-on-Avon	Conservative	Conservative	Details
Stroud	Conservative	Conservative	Details
Swale	Conservative	Conservative	Details
Tamworth	Conservative	Conservative	Details
Tandridge	Conservative	Conservative	Details
Three Rivers	Liberal Democrats	Liberal Democrats	Details
Tunbridge Wells	Conservative	Conservative	Details
Watford	Liberal Democrats	Liberal Democrats	Details
Waveney	Conservative	Conservative	Details
Welwyn Hatfield	Conservative	Conservative	Details
West Lancashire	Conservative	Conservative	Details
West Lindsey	Conservative	Conservative	Details
West Oxfordshire	Conservative	Conservative	Details
Weymouth and Portland	No overall control	No overall control	Details
Winchester	Conservative	Liberal Democrats	Details
Woking	Conservative	No overall control	Details
Worcester	No overall control	No overall control	Details
Worthing	Conservative	Conservative	Details
Wyre Forest	Conservative	Conservative	Details

== Mayoral elections ==
There were four mayoral elections.

Local Authority	Previous Mayor	New Mayor	Details
Hackney	Jules Pipe (Labour)	Jules Pipe (Labour)	Details
Lewisham	Sir Steve Bullock (Labour)	Sir Steve Bullock (Labour)	Details
Newham	Sir Robin Wales (Labour)	Sir Robin Wales (Labour)	Details
Watford	Dorothy Thornhill (Liberal Democrat)	Dorothy Thornhill (Liberal Democrat)	Details
