= 2010 Waveney District Council election =

2010 UK local government election

Map of the results

The 2010 Waveney District Council election took place on 6 May 2010 to elect members of Waveney District Council in England. This was on the same day as other local elections.

== Summary ==
2010 Waveney District Council election
Party	This election			Full council			This election		
Party	Seats	Net	Seats %	Other	Total	Total %	Votes	Votes %	+/−
Conservative	10	▼1	62.5	20	30	62.5	17,110	39.6	-1.3
Labour	6	▲3	37.5	9	15	31.3	14,456	33.5	+5.9
Liberal Democrats	0	▼1	0.0	1	2	4.2	6,706	15.5	+4.0
Green	0	Steady	0.0	1	1	2.1	3,148	7.3	-3.6
Independent	0	▼1	0.0	0	0	0.0	89	0.2	-3.3
UKIP	0	Steady	0.0	0	0	0.0	1,667	3.9	-1.7
