= 2010 Peterborough City Council election =

Peterborough City Council election

Results of the 2010 Peterborough City Council election

The 2010 Peterborough City Council election took place on 6 May 2010 to elect members of Peterborough City Council in England. This was on the same day as other local elections.

== Election result ==
2010 Peterborough City Council election
Party	This election			Full council			This election		
Party	Seats	Net	Seats %	Other	Total	Total %	Votes	Votes %	+/−
Conservative	12	Steady	63.2	32	44	77.2	29,536	44.9	-6.7
Independent	3	Steady	15.8	3	6	10.5	5,230	8.0	-3.5
Liberal	1	Steady	5.3	2	3	5.3	2,708	4.1	-0.6
Labour	1	▲1	5.3	1	2	3.5	18,064	27.5	+10.0
Liberal Democrats	2	▼1	10.5	0	2	3.5	6,816	10.4	+0.3
English Democrat	0	Steady	0.0	0	0	0.0	2,355	3.6	N/A
Green	0	Steady	0.0	0	0	0.0	1,053	1.6	-2.0
