= 2010 Hillingdon London Borough Council election =

2010 local election in England

Map of the results of the 2010 Hillingdon council election. Conservatives in blue and Labour in red.

Elections for Hillingdon Borough Council in London were held on 6 May 2010. The 2010 United Kingdom General Election and other local elections took place on the same day.

In London council elections the entire council is elected every four years, as opposed to some local elections where one councillor is elected every year in three of the four years.

== Summary of result ==
Hillingdon Council election result 2010
Party	Seats	Gains	Losses	Net gain/loss	Seats %	Votes %	Votes	+/−
Conservative	46	1	0	+1				
Labour	19	1	0	+1				
Liberal Democrats	0	0	2	-2				
Green	0	0	0	0				
Independent	0	0	0	0				
BNP	0	0	0	0			1,954	
National Front	0	0	0	0			1,172	
UKIP	0	0	0	0			611	

== Ward results ==
Barnhill Ward
Party	Candidate	Votes	%	±%
Labour	John Major	3,305	21.7	
Labour	Lindsay Bliss	3,253	21.4	
Labour	Roshan Ghei	3,027	21.4	
Conservative	Gordon Fewkes	1,273	8.4	
Conservative	Sarwan Singh Heer	1,221	8.0	
Conservative	Tariq Choudhary	1,189	7.8	
Liberal Democrats	Jennifer Cope	669	4.4	
Liberal Democrats	Mary Outhwaite	544	3.6	
Liberal Democrats	Verna Veitch	400	2.6	
National Front	Andrew Cripps	324	2.1	
Majority		1,754		
Turnout		15,205		

Botwell Ward
Party	Candidate	Votes	%	±%
Labour	Janet Gardner	3,282	20.5	
Labour	Phoday Jarjussey	2,895	18.1	
Labour	Mohammed Khursheed	2,869	18.0	
Conservative	Graham Horn	1,671	10.5	
Conservative	Labhaya Chamdal	1,574	9.8	
Conservative	Peter Smallwood	1,570	9.8	
Liberal Democrats	Michael Healy	816	5.1	
Liberal Democrats	Nigel Bakhai	661	4.1	
Liberal Democrats	Neville Parsonage	644	4.0	
Majority		1,198		
Turnout		15,982		

Brunel Ward
Party	Candidate	Votes	%	±%
Conservative	Sandra Jenkins	2,542	17.1	
Conservative	Brian Stead	2,235	15.1	
Conservative	Richard Mills	2,219	15.0	
Labour	John Campbell	1,590	10.7	
Labour	Iain Chopping	1,383	9.3	
Labour	Sharon Atubo	1,347	9.1	
Liberal Democrats	Jason Bannister	1,052	7.1	
Liberal Democrats	John Grigg	988	6.7	
Liberal Democrats	Humam Abdul-Motalib	815	5.5	
Green	Hazel Dawe	339	2.3	
Green	Susan Murray	323	2.2	
Majority		629		
Turnout		14,833		

Cavendish Ward
Party	Candidate	Votes	%	±%
Majority				
Turnout				

Charville Ward
Party	Candidate	Votes	%	±%
Labour	Beulah East	2,479	15.4	
Conservative	Mary O'Connor	2,336	14.6	
Conservative	Neil Fyfe	2,296	14.3	
Labour	David Horne	2,223	13.8	
Labour	Christopher Payne	2,176	13.6	
Conservative	Anwar Bamber	2,127	13.3	
BNP	Dianne Neal	618	3.9	
Liberal Democrats	Geoffrey Jacobs	541	3.4	
Liberal Democrats	Ian Kitt	527	3.3	
Liberal Democrats	Melanie Winterbotham	444	2.8	
Green	Michael Harling	284	1.8	
Majority		73		
Turnout				

Eastcote and East Ruislip Ward
Party	Candidate	Votes	%	±%
Majority				
Turnout				

Harefield Ward
Party	Candidate	Votes	%	±%
Conservative	Richard Barnes	1,972	29.6	
Conservative	Henry Higgins	1,703	25.6	
Liberal Democrats	Anthony Brian	804	12.1	
Liberal Democrats	Hilary Sculthorp	634	9.5	
Labour	Anthony Eginton	542	8.1	
Labour	Rowena McNamara	505	7.6	
National Front	Ian Edward	504	7.6	−6.3
Majority		899		
Turnout				

Heathrow Villages Ward
Party	Candidate	Votes	%	±%
Conservative	David Benson	1,938	15.9	
Labour	June Nelson	1,696	13.9	
Conservative	Sukhpal Kaur Brar	1,659	13.6	
Labour	Anthony Burles	1,641	13.5	
Conservative	Santokh Singh Dhillon	1,615	13.2	
Labour	Jagjit Singh	1,604	13.2	
BNP	Cheryl MacDonald	596	4.9	
Independent	Christine Taylor	539	4.4	
Independent	Russell Page	453	3.7	
Independent	Jane Taylor	447	3.7	
Majority		18		
Turnout				

Hillingdon East Ward
Party	Candidate	Votes	%	±%
Majority				
Turnout				

Ickenham Ward
Party	Candidate	Votes	%	±%
Majority				
Turnout				

Manor Ward
Party	Candidate	Votes	%	±%
Majority				
Turnout				

Northwood Ward
Party	Candidate	Votes	%	±%
Majority				
Turnout				

Pinkwell Ward
Party	Candidate	Votes	%	±%
Majority				
Turnout				

South Ruislip Ward
Party	Candidate	Votes	%	±%
Conservative	Shirley Harper-O'Neill	2,517	16.1	
Conservative	Allan Kauffman	2,499	16.0	
Conservative	Judy Kelly	2,450	15.6	
Liberal Democrats	Alister Cryan	1,340	8.6	
Labour	Ingeld Gardner	1,270	8.1	
Labour	Brenda Jones	1,237	7.9	
Labour	Clifford Pattenden	1,163	7.4	
Liberal Democrats	Christine Leonard	1,151	7.3	
Liberal Democrats	Nicholas Watts	1,082	6.9	
UKIP	Robin Kirby	611	3.9	
National Front	Francis McAllister	344	2.2	
Majority		1,110		
Turnout				

Townfield Ward
Party	Candidate	Votes	%	±%
Majority				
Turnout				

Uxbridge North Ward
Party	Candidate	Votes	%	±%
Majority				
Turnout				

Uxbridge South Ward
Party	Candidate	Votes	%	±%
Majority				
Turnout				

West Drayton Ward
Party	Candidate	Votes	%	±%
Conservative	Michael Bull	2,650	17.5	
Conservative	Paul Buttivant	2,352	15.5	
Labour	Anita MacDonald	2,183	14.4	
Conservative	Nadia Choudhary	1,979	13.0	
Labour	Prakash Auchombit	1,567	10.3	
Labour	Mustapha Sowe	1,518	10.0	
Independent	Ann Banks	1,194	7.9	
BNP	Leslie Jolley	740	4.9	
Independent	Geoffrey Courtenay	640	4.2	
Independent	Shajeel Malik	349	2.3	
Majority				
Turnout				

West Ruislip Ward
Party	Candidate	Votes	%	±%
Majority				
Turnout				

Yeading Ward
Party	Candidate	Votes	%	±%
Majority				
Turnout				

Yiewsley Ward
Party	Candidate	Votes	%	±%
Majority				
Turnout				
