= 2010 Purbeck District Council election =

2010 UK local government election

Results of the 2010 Purbeck District Council election

The 2010 Purbeck District Council election took place on 6 May 2010 to elect members of Purbeck District Council in Dorset, England. One third of the council was up for election and the council stayed under no overall control.

After the election, the composition of the council was

- Liberal Democrat 12
- Conservative 10
- Independent 2

== Background ==
Purbeck was one of only four councils in the 2010 local elections to have a candidate elected without opposition, with an Independent candidate being returned unopposed.

== Election result ==
The results saw the Liberal Democrats gain one seat from the Conservatives to hold exactly half of the seats on the council. With the election having taken place at the same time as the 2010 general election. Overall turnout in the election was over 72%.

Purbeck local election result 2010
Party	Seats	Gains	Losses	Net gain/loss	Seats %	Votes %	Votes	+/−
Conservative	5	0	1	-1	62.5	48.2	6,162	+0.9%
Liberal Democrats	2	1	0	+1	25.0	37.5	4,787	-8.1%
Independent	1	0	0	0	12.5	0	0	-2.2%
Labour	0	0	0	0	0	10.5	1,345	+5.7%
UKIP	0	0	0	0	0	3.8	487	+3.8%

== Ward results ==
Bere Regis
Party	Candidate	Votes	%	±%
Independent	Peter Wharf	unopposed		
Independent hold		Swing		

Creech Barrow
Party	Candidate	Votes	%	±%
Conservative	Nicholas Cake	822	73.3	+3.8
Labour	Edward Huskinson	300	26.7	+17.0
Majority		522	46.5	−2.2
Turnout		1,122	73.8	+28.6
Conservative hold		Swing		

Langton
Party	Candidate	Votes	%	±%
Conservative	Michael Lovell	536	52.4	−19.5
Liberal Democrats	William Knight	432	42.3	+23.0
Labour	Leigh van de Zande	54	5.3	−3.6
Majority		104	10.2	−42.4
Turnout		1,022	74.3	+22.6
Conservative hold		Swing		

Lytchett Matravers
Party	Candidate	Votes	%	±%
Liberal Democrats	Mark Gracey	1,178	52.6	
Conservative	David Cross	1,060	47.4	
Majority		118	5.2	
Turnout		2,238	74.8	+22.1
Liberal Democrats gain from Conservative		Swing		

Purbeck West
Party	Candidate	Votes	%	±%
Conservative	Barry Quinn	540	67.8	+28.5
Labour	Jon Davey	256	32.2	+14.8
Majority		284	35.7	+30.3
Turnout		796	69.6	+25.4
Conservative hold		Swing		

Swanage South
Party	Candidate	Votes	%	±%
Conservative	Gary Suttle	1,391	42.3	−8.3
Liberal Democrats	Michael Hadley	945	28.8	−1.7
Labour	Maxwell Stanford	735	22.4	+3.5
UKIP	Michael Hobson	214	6.5	+6.5
Majority		446	13.6	−6.5
Turnout		3,285	67.6	+29.1
Conservative hold		Swing		

Wareham
Party	Candidate	Votes	%	±%
Liberal Democrats	David Budd	1,810	55.1	−2.5
Conservative	Jane Thomas	1,204	36.6	−5.8
UKIP	Keith Simpson	273	8.3	+8.3
Majority		606	18.4	+3.2
Turnout		3,287	71.5	+24.5
Liberal Democrats hold		Swing		

Winfrith
Party	Candidate	Votes	%	±%
Conservative	Keith Barnes	609	59.1	−21.8
Liberal Democrats	Amanda Williams	422	40.9	+40.9
Majority		187	18.1	−43.7
Turnout		1,031	75.7	+28.7
Conservative hold		Swing		
