= 2010 Welwyn Hatfield Borough Council election =

Welwyn Hatfield Borough Council election

Results of the 2010 Welwyn Hatfield Borough Council election

The 2010 Welwyn Hatfield Borough Council election took place on 6 May 2010 to elect members of Welwyn Hatfield Borough Council in England. This was on the same day as other local elections.

== Election result ==
2010 Welwyn Hatfield Borough Council election
Party	This election			Full council			This election		
Party	Seats	Net	Seats %	Other	Total	Total %	Votes	Votes %	+/−
Conservative	16	▲2	88.9	26	42	87.5	28,838	53.9	-5.8
Liberal Democrats	1	Steady	5.6	2	3	6.3	12,093	22.6	+4.4
Labour	1	▼2	5.6	2	3	6.3	11,189	20.9	+1.5
Green	0	Steady	0.0	0	0	0.0	1,160	2.2	-0.4
BNP	0	Steady	0.0	0	0	0.0	222	0.4	+0.2

== Ward results ==
=== Brookmans Park and Little Heath ===
Brookmans Park and Little Heath
Party	Candidate	Votes	%	±%
Conservative	John Dean	2,717	77.3	±0.0
Liberal Democrats	Jenny Blumson	547	15.6	+1.8
Labour	Donald Mahon	249	7.1	−1.8
Majority		2,170	61.7	N/A
Turnout		3,513	76.7	+31.3
Conservative hold		Swing	▼0.9	

=== Haldens ===
Haldens
Party	Candidate	Votes	%	±%
Conservative	Martyn Levitt	1,525	46.9	−3.6
Labour	Mbizo Mpufo	806	24.8	−11.4
Liberal Democrats	Shirley Shaw	745	22.9	+9.6
Green	Berenice Dowlen	174	5.4	N/A
Majority		719	22.1	N/A
Turnout		3,250	67.0	+32.9
Conservative hold		Swing	▲3.9	

=== Handside ===
Handside
Party	Candidate	Votes	%	±%
Liberal Democrats	Tony Skottowe	1,824	44.8	−1.5
Conservative	Chris Cory	1,812	44.5	−3.4
Labour	John Pomroy	433	10.6	+4.8
Majority		12	0.3	N/A
Turnout		4,069	77.6	+21.7
Liberal Democrats hold		Swing	▲1.0	

=== Hatfield Central ===
Hatfield Central
Party	Candidate	Votes	%	±%
Conservative	Bukky Olawoyin	988	36.1	−6.4
Labour	Colin Croft	965	35.3	−5.4
Liberal Democrats	Hazel Laming	784	28.6	+11.8
Majority		23	0.8	N/A
Turnout		2,737	56.3	+27.8
Conservative gain from Labour		Swing	▼0.5	

=== Hatfield East ===
Hatfield East
Party	Candidate	Votes	%	±%
Conservative	Tony Kingsbury	1,692	52.6	−2.5
Liberal Democrats	Lis Meyland-Smith	783	24.3	+2.7
Labour	Margaret White	741	23.0	−0.3
Majority		909	28.3	N/A
Turnout		3,216	64.7	+31.2
Conservative hold		Swing	▼2.6	

=== Hatfield South ===
Hatfield South
Party	Candidate	Votes	%	±%
Labour	Linda Mendez	817	40.0	+2.1
Conservative	David Hughes	767	37.5	−10.1
Liberal Democrats	Sheila Archer	460	22.5	+8.0
Majority		50	2.5	N/A
Turnout		2,044	55.1	+26.9
Labour gain from Conservative		Swing	▲6.1	

=== Hatfield Villages ===
Hatfield Villages (2 seats due to by-election)
Party	Candidate	Votes	%	±%
Conservative	Howard Morgan	1,143	47.2	−15.5
Conservative	Lynne Sparks	1,107	45.7	−17.0
Labour	Bridie Croft	609	25.2	+0.8
Liberal Democrats	Bobby Bridgeman	568	23.5	+10.6
Liberal Democrats	Maurice Richardson	552	22.8	+9.9
Labour	Brian Wilson	166	6.9	−17.5
Turnout		2,421	61.7	+36.0
Conservative hold				
Conservative hold				

=== Hatfield West ===
Hatfield West
Party	Candidate	Votes	%	±%
Conservative	Caron Juggins	1,703	47.6	−0.6
Labour	Cathy Watson	1,071	29.9	−3.1
Liberal Democrats	James Finlay	807	22.5	+3.7
Majority		632	17.7	N/A
Turnout		3,581	58.2	+24.7
Conservative hold		Swing	▲1.3	

=== Hollybush ===
Hollybush
Party	Candidate	Votes	%	±%
Conservative	Nick Pace	1,566	47.2	+5.5
Labour	Margaret Birleson	1,108	33.4	−8.5
Liberal Democrats	Ewan Armstrong-Bridges	643	19.4	+2.9
Majority		458	13.8	N/A
Turnout		3,317	62.5	+34.3
Conservative gain from Labour		Swing	▲7.0	

=== Howlands ===
Howlands
Party	Candidate	Votes	%	±%
Conservative	George Michaelides	1,132	36.2	−3.5
Labour	Alan Chesterman	783	25.1	+3.0
Liberal Democrats	Lynda Cowan	719	23.0	+14.6
Green	Jill Weston	489	15.7	−14.1
Majority		349	11.1	N/A
Turnout		3,123	68.2	+29.0
Conservative hold		Swing	▼3.3	

=== Northaw and Cuffley ===
Northaw and Cuffley (2 seats due to by-election)
Party	Candidate	Votes	%	±%
Conservative	John Nicholls	2,418	75.8	−3.2
Conservative	Adrian Prest	1,798	56.4	−22.6
Labour	Nigel Bain	582	18.2	N/A
BNP	Mark Fuller	222	7.0	N/A
Turnout		3,190	73.7	+37.4
Conservative hold				
Conservative hold				

=== Panshanger ===
Panshanger
Party	Candidate	Votes	%	±%
Conservative	Roger Trigg	1,734	51.4	−0.4
Liberal Democrats	Frank Marsh	896	26.6	+12.6
Labour	Zacha Hennessey	619	18.4	−1.2
Green	Adrian Toole	122	3.6	−11.0
Majority		838	24.8	N/A
Turnout		3,371	67.9	+35.8
Conservative hold		Swing	▼6.5	

=== Peartree ===
Peartree
Party	Candidate	Votes	%	±%
Conservative	Dom Cox	1,185	39.0	+9.9
Liberal Democrats	Caroline Duke	1,060	34.9	−2.9
Labour	Steve Roberts	793	26.1	−7.1
Majority		125	4.1	N/A
Turnout		3,038	58.1	+31.2
Conservative gain from Labour		Swing	▲6.4	

=== Sherrads ===
Sherrads
Party	Candidate	Votes	%	±%
Conservative	Jon Beckerman	1,728	51.5	+5.9
Labour	Tony Crump	786	23.4	+2.3
Liberal Democrats	Jon Arch	625	18.6	+0.9
Green	Susan Groom	214	6.4	−9.2
Majority		942	28.1	N/A
Turnout		3,353	75.0	+31.3
Conservative hold		Swing	▲1.8	

=== Welham Green ===
Welham Green
Party	Candidate	Votes	%	±%
Conservative	Keith Pieri	1,285	65.1	+14.1
Liberal Democrats	Simon Archer	393	19.9	−14.6
Labour	Diana Bell	296	15.0	+9.4
Majority		892	45.2	N/A
Turnout		1,974	68.7	+19.0
Conservative hold		Swing	▲14.4	

=== Welwyn East ===
Welwyn East
Party	Candidate	Votes	%	±%
Conservative	Steven Markiewicz	2,538	67.7	−7.8
Liberal Democrats	Ian Skidmore	687	18.3	+5.1
Labour	Peter Hayman	365	9.7	−1.6
Green	Mark Knight	161	4.3	N/A
Majority		1,851	49.4	N/A
Turnout		3,751	77.4	+35.7
Conservative hold		Swing	▼6.5	
