= 2010 Brentwood Borough Council election =

2010 UK local government election

Results of the 2010 Brentwood Borough Council election

The 2010 Brentwood council election took place on 6 May 2010 to elect members of Brentwood District Council in Essex, England as part of the 2010 United Kingdom local elections. One third of the council was up for election with the council previously having a majority for the Conservative Party. The Conservative Party lost two seats to the Liberal Democrats in Brentwood North and Brentwood West respectively.

Prior to the election the composition of the council was:

- Conservative 28
- Liberal Democrat 6
- Labour 2
- Independent 1

Following the election the composition of the council is:

- Conservative 27
- Liberal Democrat 8
- Labour 1
- Independent 1

== Composition of expiring seats before election ==
Ward	Party	Incumbent Elected	Incumbent	Result
Brentwood North	Conservative	2006	Russell Quirk	Lost seat to Lib Dems
Brentwood South	Labour	2006	David Minns	Lost seat to Conservative
Brentwood West	Conservative	2006	Karen Sheehan	Lost seat to Lib Dems
Brizes & Doddinghurst	Conservative	2006	Keith Parker	Con Hold
Herongate, Ingrave & West Horndon	Conservative	2006	Linda Golding	Con Hold
Hutton Central	Conservative	2006	Alan Braid	Con Hold
Hutton East	Conservative	2006	Jennifer Monnickendam	Con Hold
Hutton South	Conservative	2006	Roger Hirst	Con Hold
Ingatestone, Fryerning & Mountnessing	Conservative	2006	Richard Harrison	Con Hold
Pilgrims Hatch	Liberal Democrats	2006	Barry Aspinell	Lib Dem Hold
Shenfield	Conservative	2006	Lionel Lee	Con Hold
South Weald	Conservative	2006	Ann Coe	Con Hold
Warley	Conservative	2006	Janet Pound	Con Hold
