= 2010 Newcastle City Council election =

Newcastle UK local election 2010

- 6 May 2010

27 out of 78 seats to Newcastle City Council (including 1 by-election) 40 seats needed for a majority
- Turnout: 59.3% (▲21.2)

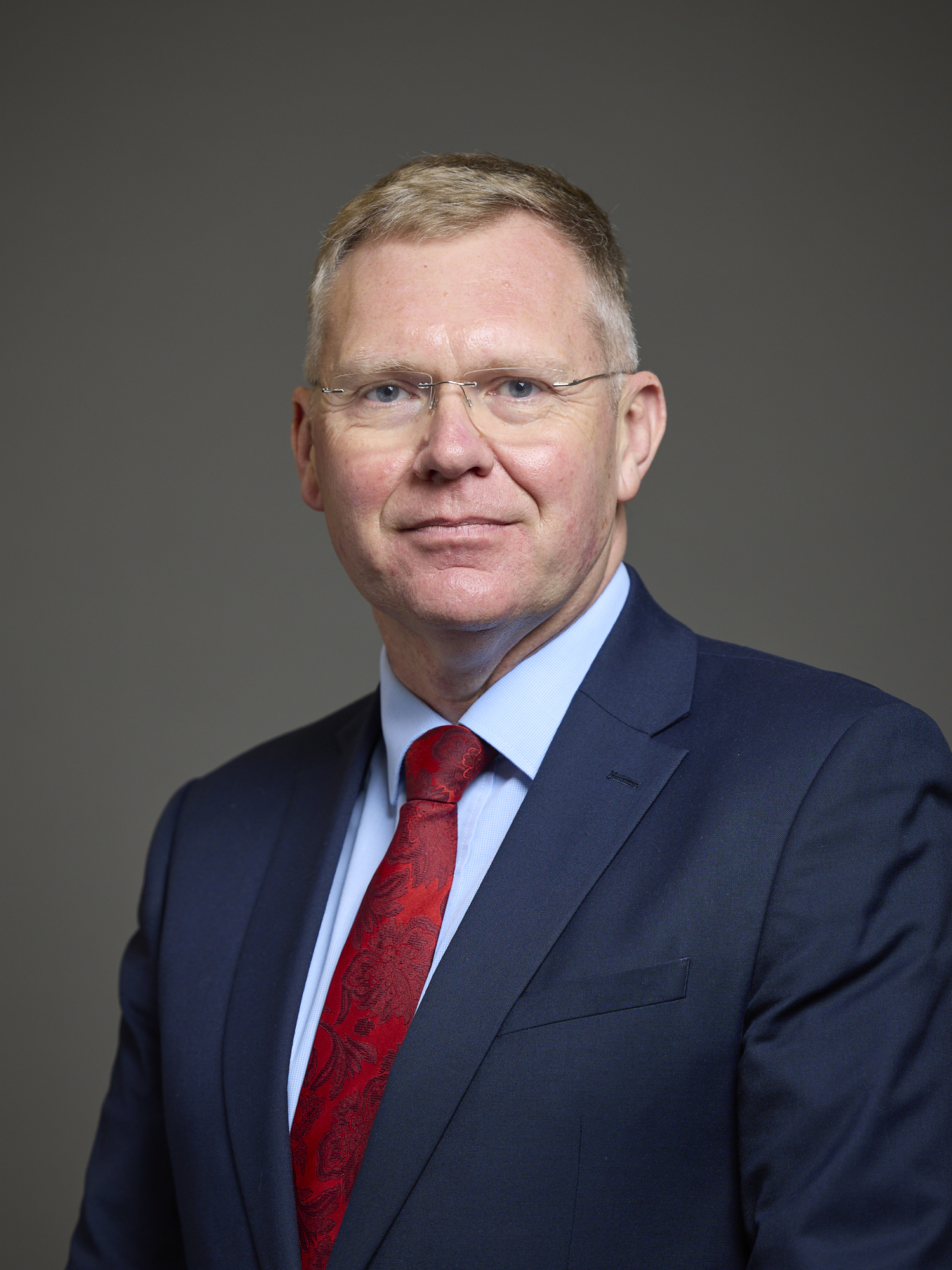
	First party	Second party	Third party
Leader	David Falkner	Nick Forbes	N/A
Party	Liberal Democrats	Labour	Independent
Leader's seat	Fawdon	Westgate	N/A
Seats before	48	28	2
Seats won	11	16	0
Seats after	42	34	2
Seat change	▼6	▲6	Steady
Popular vote	45,472	46,572	325
Percentage	38.1%	39.1%	0.3%
Swing	▼8.7	▲8.3	▼0.6
- Results of the 2010 Newcastle City Council election

The 2010 Newcastle City Council election took place on 6 May 2010 to elect one third of the members of Newcastle City Council in England. The elections took place on the same day as other council elections in England and Wales and the general election.

Following the last set of local elections held in 2008, two members of the Liberal Democrats resigned and sat as independents. The Liberal Democrats also gained one seat from Labour in a by-election.

There were 27 of the 78 seats on the council up for election, being the usual third of the council plus a by-election in the Denton ward. The result saw the Labour Party gain six seats from the Liberal Democrats.

== Previous council composition ==
After 2008 election		Before 2010 election		After 2010 election	
Party	Seats	Party	Seats	Party	Seats
Liberal Democrats	49	Liberal Democrats	48	Liberal Democrats	42
Labour	29	Labour	28	Labour	34
Independent	0	Independent	2	Independent	2

Changes 2008-2010:

- January 2009: Terry Cooney (Labour) dies; Mitzi Emery (Liberal Democrats) gains the Fenham ward seat in a byelection.
- October 2009: Marc Donnelly and Pat Hillicks leave the Liberal Democrats to sit as Independents.

== Results Summary ==
2010 Newcastle City Council election
Party	This election				Full council			This election		
Party	Candidates	Seats	Net	Seats %	Other	Total	Total %	Votes	Votes %	+/−
Liberal Democrats	{{{candidates}}}	11	▼6	40.7	31	42	53.8	45,472	38.1	▼8.7
Labour	{{{candidates}}}	16	▲6	59.3	18	34	43.6	46,572	39.1	▲8.3
Independent	{{{candidates}}}	0	Steady	0.0	2	2	2.6	325	0.3	▼0.6
Conservative	{{{candidates}}}	0	Steady	0.0	0	0	0.0	17,240	14.5	▲0.6
BNP	{{{candidates}}}	0	Steady	0.0	0	0	0.0	6,659	5.6	▲0.3
Green	{{{candidates}}}	0	Steady	0.0	0	0	0.0	2,560	2.1	▲0.5
UKIP	{{{candidates}}}	0	Steady	0.0	0	0	0.0	363	0.3	▲0.1
National Front	{{{candidates}}}	0	Steady	0.0	0	0	0.0	62	0.1	New

== Ward Results ==
=== Benwell and Scotswood ===
Benwell and Scotswood
Party	Candidate	Votes	%	±%
Labour	Jeremy Beecham*	2,390	54.8	+6.7
Liberal Democrats	Alice McIlveen	886	20.3	−0.1
Conservative	Edythe Clayton	556	12.7	+0.5
BNP	Doug Graham	533	12.2	−2.1
Majority		1504	34.5	
Turnout		4365	50.9	+14.8
Labour hold		Swing		

=== Blakelaw ===
Blakelaw
Party	Candidate	Votes	%	±%
Labour	Phil Risk	1,814	42.3	+11.9
Liberal Democrats	Bill Schardt	1,588	37.0	−12.6
Conservative	James Langley	456	10.6	+0.1
BNP	Jim Lowdon	430	10.0	+0.4
Majority		226	5.3	
Turnout		4288	53.9	+17.4
Labour gain from Liberal Democrats		Swing		

=== Byker ===
Byker
Party	Candidate	Votes	%	±%
Labour	Nick Kemp*	2,070	57.7	+1.2
Liberal Democrats	Karen Heslop	871	24.3	+7.4
Conservative	Alice Gingell	330	9.2	−0.1
BNP	Ken Baldwin	317	8.8	−4.0
Majority		1199	33.4	
Turnout		3588	50.1	+18.5
Labour hold		Swing		

=== Castle ===
Castle
Party	Candidate	Votes	%	±%
Liberal Democrats	Anita Lower*	2,451	48.6	−11.3
Labour	Eric Mackinlay	1,435	28.4	+13.0
Conservative	Jon Aydon	718	14.2	−10.5
BNP	Terry Gibson	342	6.8	N/A
Independent	Alan Biggins	101	2.0	N/A
Majority		1016	20.2	
Turnout		5047	67.5	+24.8
Liberal Democrats hold		Swing		

=== Dene ===
Dene
Party	Candidate	Votes	%	±%
Liberal Democrats	Sharon Bailey	2,698	52.6	−10.0
Labour	Ian Rossiter	1,353	26.4	+9.2
Conservative	Heather Chambers	779	15.2	−4.9
BNP	David Tullin	178	3.5	N/A
Green	Taz Burwaiss	118	2.3	N/A
Majority		1346	26.2	
Turnout		5126	68.2	+25.4
Liberal Democrats hold		Swing		

=== Denton ===
Denton (2 seats due to by-election) Replacing Peter Arnold (Liberal Democrats)
Party	Candidate	Votes	%	±%
Liberal Democrats	Sarah Cross	1,804	37.5	−12.2
Labour	Michael Burke	1,668	34.7	+9.0
Labour	Simon Bird	1,663		
Liberal Democrats	Henry Gallagher	1,281		
Conservative	Ernest Shorton	696	14.5	+3.6
Conservative	Olga Shorton	516		
UKIP	Ian Proud	363	7.5	+3.6
BNP	Neil Mooney	278	5.8	−4.0
BNP	Lynda Scurr	198		
Majority		1346	26.2	
Turnout			59.6	+15.2
Liberal Democrats hold		Swing		
Labour gain from Liberal Democrats		Swing		

=== East Gosforth ===
East Gosforth
Party	Candidate	Votes	%	±%
Liberal Democrats	David Slesenger*	2,601	49.6	−13.0
Labour	Hilary Franks	1,525	29.1	+12.5
Conservative	Martin Sharman	853	16.3	−4.5
Green	David Coombes	263	5.0	N/A
Majority		1076	20.5	
Turnout		5242	70.9	+26.6
Liberal Democrats hold		Swing		

=== Elswick ===
Elswick
Party	Candidate	Votes	%	±%
Labour	Habib Rahman	2,126	59.4	+21.2
Liberal Democrats	Barbara Down	619	17.3	+4.7
BNP	Denny Gallagher	414	11.6	−15.3
Conservative	Ronald Toward	278	7.8	+0.5
Independent	Derek Malcolm	80	2.2	N/A
National Front	Simon Bigg	62	1.7	N/A
Majority		1507	42.1	
Turnout		3579	48.0	+14.6
Labour hold		Swing		

=== Fawdon ===
Fawdon
Party	Candidate	Votes	%	±%
Liberal Democrats	David Faulkner*	2,076	49.2	−10.8
Labour	DJ Mather	1,514	35.9	+14.9
Conservative	Pam Flux	362	8.6	+2.0
BNP	Steven Spence	270	6.4	N/A
Majority		562	13.3	
Turnout		4222	59.2	+18.0
Liberal Democrats hold		Swing		

=== Fenham ===
Fenham
Party	Candidate	Votes	%	±%
Labour	Helen McStravick	1,884	40.3	+7.2
Liberal Democrats	PJ Morrissey	1,563	33.4	−0.5
BNP	Ken Booth	641	13.7	−13.3
Conservative	Alison Wake	487	10.4	+4.4
Green	Keith Metcalf	99	2.1	N/A
Majority		321	6.9	
Turnout		4674	58.6	+19.0
Labour gain from Liberal Democrats		Swing		

=== Kenton ===
Kenton
Party	Candidate	Votes	%	±%
Labour	Ged Bell	2,291	52.6	−0.3
Liberal Democrats	Yetunde Adediran	1,053	24.2	−4.8
Conservative	Kevin O'Neill	693	15.9	−2.3
BNP	Alan Spence	319	7.3	N/A
Majority		1238	28.4	
Turnout		4356	54.8	+20.2
Labour hold		Swing		

=== Lemington ===
Lemington
Party	Candidate	Votes	%	±%
Labour	David Cook	1,866	42.2	+4.3
Liberal Democrats	Barbara Moorhead	1,694	38.4	−4.5
Conservative	Sarah Armstrong	472	10.7	+2.4
BNP	Ian Belcher	385	8.7	−2.2
Majority		172	3.8	
Turnout		4417	59.1	+18.9
Labour gain from Liberal Democrats		Swing		

=== Newburn ===
Newburn
Party	Candidate	Votes	%	±%
Labour	Linda Wright	2,000	44.0	+5.1
Liberal Democrats	Susan Long	1,695	37.3	−5.7
Conservative	Carl Ellis	521	11.5	+4.0
BNP	Paul Kennett	330	7.3	−3.3
Majority		305	6.7	
Turnout		4546	63.2	+18.4
Labour hold		Swing		

=== North Heaton ===
North Heaton
Party	Candidate	Votes	%	±%
Liberal Democrats	Greg Stone	2,345	45.1	−10.2
Labour	David Denholm	1,831	35.2	+12.7
Conservative	Neville Armstrong	680	13.1	+0.1
Green	Michael Rabley	342	6.6	−2.6
Majority		514	9.9	
Turnout		5198	67.9	+27.3
Liberal Democrats hold		Swing		

=== North Jesmond ===
North Jesmond
Party	Candidate	Votes	%	±%
Liberal Democrats	Catherine Pagan	1,938	46.7	−7.5
Labour	Alison Orlandi	987	23.8	−2.2
Conservative	James Marwick	945	22.8	+3.0
Green	Tim Dowson	281	6.8	N/A
Majority		951	22.9	
Turnout		4151	57.9	+29.5
Liberal Democrats hold		Swing		

=== Ouseburn ===
Ouseburn
Party	Candidate	Votes	%	±%
Liberal Democrats	Gareth Kane	1,713	46.0	−5.1
Labour	Ian Preston	1,201	32.3	+4.0
Conservative	Emma Carr	452	12.1	+2.9
Green	Dave Shepherdson	244	6.6	−4.8
BNP	Lisa Dunleavy	111	3.0	N/A
Majority		512	13.7	
Turnout		3721	49.9	+26.3
Liberal Democrats hold		Swing		

=== Parklands ===
Parklands
Party	Candidate	Votes	%	±%
Liberal Democrats	Diane Packham	3,117	55.4	−7.1
Conservative	Keith Piper	1,128	20.0	+0.8
Labour	Susan Pearson	1,123	20.0	+8.7
Independent	Andrea Bell	144	2.6	−4.3
BNP	Ray Hall	116	2.1	N/A
Majority		1989	35.4	
Turnout		5628	74.2	+27.2
Liberal Democrats hold		Swing		

=== South Heaton ===
South Heaton
Party	Candidate	Votes	%	±%
Labour	Sophie White	1,735	46.1	Steady
Liberal Democrats	Mark Nelson	1,394	37.0	−2.5
Conservative	Kenneth Wake	289	7.7	+2.5
Green	Andrew Gray	245	6.5	−2.7
BNP	Michael Strong	104	2.8	N/A
Majority		341	9.1	
Turnout		3767	56.8	+21.7
Labour hold		Swing		

=== South Jesmond ===
South Jesmond
Party	Candidate	Votes	%	±%
Liberal Democrats	Tom Woodwark	1,936	48.6	−6.1
Labour	Tom Hardwick	997	25.0	+4.5
Conservative	Joanne Lavender	726	18.2	−6.7
Green	Tony Waterston	262	6.6	N/A
BNP	Sheila Gregory	60	1.5	N/A
Majority		939	23.6	
Turnout		3981	56.3	+28.0
Liberal Democrats hold		Swing		

=== Walker ===
Walker
Party	Candidate	Votes	%	±%
Labour	John Stokel-Walker	2,703	70.0	+12.6
Liberal Democrats	Michael Burn	626	16.2	−3.5
BNP	John Mitchell	281	7.3	−3.6
Conservative	Marian McWilliams	250	6.5	−0.3
Majority		2077	53.8	
Turnout		3860		
Labour hold		Swing		

=== Walkergate ===
Walkergate
Party	Candidate	Votes	%	±%
Labour	Maureen Lowson	2,009	46.0	+17.9
Liberal Democrats	David Besag	1,706	39.1	−16.4
Conservative	Stephen Lowrey	346	7.9	+1.1
BNP	Shaun Russell	303	6.9	−2.8
Majority		303	6.9	
Turnout		4364	61.3	+20.0
Labour gain from Liberal Democrats		Swing		

=== West Gosforth ===
West Gosforth
Party	Candidate	Votes	%	±%
Liberal Democrats	Bill Shepherd	2,847	50.9	−11.3
Conservative	Karen Jewers	1,485	26.6	+1.5
Labour	Howard Elcock	941	16.8	+4.0
Green	Sandy Irvine	237	4.2	N/A
BNP	Bill Curry	82	1.5	N/A
Majority		1363	24.3	
Turnout		3981	74.7	+28.0
Liberal Democrats hold		Swing		

=== Westerhope ===
Westerhope
Party	Candidate	Votes	%	±%
Labour	Brian Hunter	1,947	36.5	+14.8
Liberal Democrats	Neil Hamilton	1,762	33.0	−20.5
Conservative	Jason Smith	1,298	24.3	+7.6
BNP	Bill Armstrong	330	6.2	−1.8
Majority		185	3.5	
Turnout		5337	70.4	+19.1
Labour gain from Liberal Democrats		Swing		

=== Westgate ===
Westgate
Party	Candidate	Votes	%	±%
Labour	Geoff O'Brien	1,366	46.5	−18.2
Liberal Democrats	Peter Andras	843	28.7	+7.7
Conservative	Elaine Bamford	369	12.6	−1.6
BNP	Mick Roche	184	6.3	N/A
Green	Laurence Ellacott	175	6.0	N/A
Majority		523	17.8	
Turnout		2937	46.7	+21.6
Labour hold		Swing		

=== Wingrove ===
Wingrove
Party	Candidate	Votes	%	±%
Labour	Joyce McCarty	1,924	44.1	+2.5
Liberal Democrats	James Hollis	1,078	24.7	−11.0
Conservative	Mehrban Sadiq	916	21.0	+9.9
Green	John Pearson	294	6.7	−4.9
BNP	Russ Rickerby	146	3.4	N/A
Majority		846	19.4	
Turnout		4358	54.4	+19.6
Labour hold		Swing		

=== Woolsington ===
Woolsington
Party	Candidate	Votes	%	±%
Labour	George Pattison	2,209	49.7	+1.7
Liberal Democrats	James Kenyon	1,287	29.0	−6.5
Conservative	William Holloway	639	14.4	+5.5
BNP	Gary Gibson	307	6.9	−0.7
Majority		922	20.7	
Turnout		4442	56.9	+15.4
Labour hold		Swing		
