= 2010 Great Yarmouth Borough Council election =

2010 UK local government election

Map of the results of the 2010 Great Yarmouth council election. Conservatives in blue and Labour in red. Wards in grey were not contested in 2010.

The 2010 Great Yarmouth Borough Council election took place on 6 May 2010 to elect members of Great Yarmouth Borough Council in Norfolk, England. One third of the council was up for election and the Conservative Party stayed in overall control of the council.

After the election, the composition of the council was:

- Conservative 24
- Labour 15

== Background ==
Before the election the Conservatives held control of the council with 24 seats, compared to 15 for Labour. 14 seats were contested at the election with both the Conservative and Labour parties defending 7 seats. Claydon ward had 2 seats up for election after Labour councillor Dick Barker died in February 2010. Both the Conservative and Labour parties contested all 14 seats, while there were also 5 Liberal Democrats and 2 independent candidates.

With the council election being held at the same time as the general election, local issues including the outer harbour, an additional river crossing and local regeneration, were mixed with national issues during the campaign.

== Election result ==
The Conservatives remained in control of the council, with the political balance on the council staying the same. The Conservatives gained a seat in Caister South from Labour, but lost one back to Labour in Yarmouth North.

In Yarmouth North both candidates tied on 1,034 votes each after four recounts. As a result, a pack of playing cards was used to determine the result. The Conservative candidate, Bob Peck, drew a three and Labour's Charlie Marsden then drew a seven. Therefore, Labour were allocated one more vote and gained the seat from the Conservatives.

Great Yarmouth local election result 2010
Party	Seats	Gains	Losses	Net gain/loss	Seats %	Votes %	Votes	+/−
Conservative	7	1	1	0	50.0	49.4	18,085	-5.3%
Labour	7	1	1	0	50.0	42.5	15,544	+8.2%
Liberal Democrats	0	0	0	0	0	6.2	2,276	+0.1%
Independent	0	0	0	0	0	1.9	691	+1.9%

== Ward results ==
Bradwell North
Party	Candidate	Votes	%	±%
Conservative	Graham Plant	1,801	55.8	+8.8
Labour	Hilary Wainwright	1,427	44.2	+0.2
Majority		374	11.6	+8.6
Turnout		3,228	65.3	+32.6
Conservative hold		Swing		

Bradwell South & Hopton
Party	Candidate	Votes	%	±%
Conservative	Mike Butcher	1,925	58.9	+10.9
Labour	Barbara Wright	1,344	41.1	+21.9
Majority		581	17.8	−7.7
Turnout		3,269	65.4	+21.6
Conservative hold		Swing		

Caister North
Party	Candidate	Votes	%	±%
Conservative	Tony Smith	1,212	51.0	−4.3
Labour	Nick Dack	739	31.1	+1.0
Liberal Democrats	Nicholas Dyer	427	18.0	+3.4
Majority		473	19.9	−5.4
Turnout		2,378	65.4	+33.4
Conservative hold		Swing		

Caister South
Party	Candidate	Votes	%	±%
Conservative	Ronald Hanton	1,049	44.6	−5.0
Labour	Patrick Hacon	905	38.5	−11.9
Liberal Democrats	Rod Cole	399	17.0	+17.0
Majority		144	6.1	
Turnout		2,353	68.1	+31.3
Conservative gain from Labour		Swing		

Central & Northgate
Party	Candidate	Votes	%	±%
Labour	Mike Castle	1,256	44.4	+1.3
Conservative	Tom Garrod	1,089	38.5	+0.5
Liberal Democrats	Gordon Dean	484	17.1	+7.9
Majority		167	5.9	+0.7
Turnout		2,829	50.6	+23.9
Labour hold		Swing		

Claydon (2)
Party	Candidate	Votes	%	±%
Labour	Coleen Walker	1,512		
Labour	Bernard Williamson	1,429		
Conservative	Bob Scott	1,259		
Conservative	Matthew Smith	1,222		
Turnout		5,422	54.8	+26.4
Labour hold		Swing		
Labour hold		Swing		

East Flegg
Party	Candidate	Votes	%	±%
Conservative	Shirley Weymouth	1,549	57.6	−9.3
Labour	Caroline Mynett	589	21.9	+4.5
Liberal Democrats	Pam Mayhew	550	20.5	+4.8
Majority		960	35.7	−13.8
Turnout		2,688	70.1	+33.7
Conservative hold		Swing		

Gorleston
Party	Candidate	Votes	%	±%
Conservative	John Burroughs	1,687	63.9	−12.7
Labour	Katie James	954	36.1	+12.7
Majority		733	27.8	−25.4
Turnout		2,641		
Conservative hold		Swing		

Lothingland
Party	Candidate	Votes	%	±%
Conservative	Barry Stone	1,750	64.2	−8.3
Labour	Chris Williamson	974	35.8	+8.3
Majority		776	28.5	−16.5
Turnout		2,724	64.6	+34.2
Conservative hold		Swing		

Magdalen
Party	Candidate	Votes	%	±%
Labour	Trevor Wainwright	1,535	50.7	+2.7
Conservative	Carl Smith	1,127	37.3	−14.7
Independent	Margaret McMahon-Morris	363	12.0	+12.0
Majority		408	13.4	
Turnout		3,025	59.2	+28.6
Labour hold		Swing		

Nelson
Party	Candidate	Votes	%	±%
Labour	Val Pettit	1,120	48.2	+2.9
Conservative	Malcolm Bird	875	37.7	+2.6
Independent	Alan Sowle	328	14.1	+14.1
Majority		245	10.5	+0.3
Turnout		2,323	41.3	+22.0
Labour hold		Swing		

Southtown & Cobholm
Party	Candidate	Votes	%	±%
Labour	John Holmes	725	44.0	−2.1
Conservative	Victor Ling	506	30.7	+8.2
Liberal Democrats	Tony Harris	416	25.3	+14.3
Majority		219	13.3	−10.3
Turnout		1,647	44.4	+23.9
Labour hold		Swing		

Yarmouth North
Party	Candidate	Votes	%	±%
Labour	Charlie Marsden	1,035	50.0	+8.2
Conservative	Bob Peck	1,034	50.0	−8.2
Majority		1	0	
Turnout		2,068	60.8	+26.2
Labour gain from Conservative		Swing		
