= 2010 Oldham Metropolitan Borough Council election =

2010 local election in England

Results of the 2010 Oldham Metropolitan Borough Council election

Elections to Oldham Council were held on 6 May 2010, on the same day as the UK General Election. One third of the council was up for election. The council remained in no overall control..

After the election, the composition of the council was

- Labour 27
- Liberal Democrat 27
- Conservative 6

== Election result ==
Oldham local election result 2010
Party	Seats	Gains	Losses	Net gain/loss	Seats %	Votes %	Votes	+/−
Labour	13	5	0	+5		38.3	37,297	+6.8
Liberal Democrats	7	0	3	-3		30.5	29,753	-7.1
Conservative	0	0	1	-1		25.5	24,883	+1.1
Independent	0	0	1	-1		4.3	4,153	+2.2
BNP	0	0	0			0.5	516	-1.3
England First	0	0	0			0.4	425	-0.9
Respect	0	0	0			0.4	387	+0.4

== Ward results ==
=== Alexandra ward ===
Alexandra ward
Party	Candidate	Votes	%	±%
Labour	Hugh McDonald	1,337	34.4	+5.3
Conservative	Raja Iqbal	923	23.7	−6.8
Liberal Democrats	Pat Lord	815	21.0	−12.8
Independent	Asaf Ali	631	16.2	+16.2
Independent	Phil Howarth	181	4.7	−1.9
Majority		414	10.7	
Turnout		3,887		
Labour hold		Swing		

=== Chadderton Central ward ===
Chadderton Central ward
Party	Candidate	Votes	%	±%
Labour	Colin McLaren	2,430	50.6	+18.6
Conservative	Robert Barnes	1,450	30.2	−5.5
Liberal Democrats	Kevin Dawson	858	17.9	+10.1
Respect	Ikram Ali	66	1.4	+1.4
Majority		980	20.4	+16.7
Turnout		4,804	60.68	+25.81
Labour hold		Swing		

=== Chadderton North ward ===
Chadderton North ward
Party	Candidate	Votes	%	±%
Labour	Barbara Brownridge	2,244	43.2	+12.8
Conservative	Phil Rogers	1,969	37.9	−17.9
Liberal Democrats	Keith Taylor	816	15.7	+1.9
Respect	Ibrahim Ali	166	3.2	+3.2
Majority		275	5.3	
Turnout		5,195		
Labour gain from Conservative		Swing		

=== Chadderton South ward ===
Chadderton South ward
Party	Candidate	Votes	%	±%
Labour	Joy Wrigglesworth	2,362	53.1	+12.4
Conservative	Lewis Quigg	1,480	33.3	+2.1
Liberal Democrats	Fazal Fazal	608	13.7	+3.7
Majority		882	19.8	+10.3
Turnout		4,450		
Labour hold		Swing		

=== Coldhurst ward ===
Coldhurst ward
Party	Candidate	Votes	%	±%
Labour	Abdul Malik	2,678	49.9	−2.9
Liberal Democrats	Mohib Uddin	2,100	39.1	+0.3
Conservative	Sharif Miah	593	11.0	+2.6
Majority		578	10.8	−3.2
Turnout		5,371		
Labour gain from Liberal Democrats		Swing		

=== Crompton ward ===
Crompton ward
Party	Candidate	Votes	%	±%
Liberal Democrats	Philomena Dillon	2,458	44.7	−14.1
Conservative	David Dunning	1,413	25.7	−3.1
Labour	Gareth Jones	1,107	20.1	+7.7
BNP	Alwyn Stott	516	9.4	+9.4
Majority		1,045	19.0	−11.0
Turnout		5,494		
Liberal Democrats hold		Swing		

=== Failsworth East ward ===
Failsworth East ward
Party	Candidate	Votes	%	±%
Labour	Barbara Dawson	2,492	52.9	+9.6
Conservative	David McDonald	1,438	30.5	−13.2
Liberal Democrats	Dorothy Shaw	546	11.6	+5.9
Independent	John Parker	235	22.4	+24.4
Majority		1,054	22.4	
Turnout		4,711		
Labour hold		Swing		

=== Failsworth West ward ===
Failsworth West ward
Party	Candidate	Votes	%	±%
Labour	John Battye	2,062	45.3	+12.2
Conservative	Neil Cartridge	1,285	28.2	−9.5
Independent	Warren Bates	640	14.1	+14.1
Liberal Democrats	Phil Renold	564	12.4	+7.2
Majority		777	17.1	
Turnout		4,551		
Labour hold		Swing		

=== Hollinwood ward ===
Hollinwood ward
Party	Candidate	Votes	%	±%
Labour	Jean Stretton	1,653	43.8	+3.6
Liberal Democrats	Stephen Barrow	1,281	34.0	−17.4
Conservative	Ann Heeks	568	15.1	+6.7
Independent	John Berry	269	7.1	+7.1
Majority		372	9.8	
Turnout		3,771		
Labour gain from Liberal Democrats		Swing		

=== Medlock Vale ward ===
Medlock Vale ward
Party	Candidate	Votes	%	±%
Labour	Yasmin Toor	1,877	42.1	+2.2
Liberal Democrats	Rafiq Pazeer	1,606	36.0	+3.5
Conservative	Ken Heeks	886	18.9	+11.0
Respect	Habibur Rahman	94	2.1	+2.1
Majority		271	6.1	−1.3
Turnout		4,463		
Labour hold		Swing		

=== Royton North ward ===
Royton North ward
Party	Candidate	Votes	%	±%
Labour	Olwen Chadderton	2,539	48.5	+12.3
Conservative	Joseph Farquhar	1,684	32.1	+5.3
Liberal Democrats	Stephen Fairbrother	1,016	19.4	−5.2
Majority		855	16.3	+7.0
Turnout		5,239		
Labour hold		Swing		

=== Royton South ward ===
Royton South ward
Party	Candidate	Votes	%	±%
Labour	Phil Harrison	2,047	40.9	+10.3
Liberal Democrats	Mari Wiswell	1,484	29.6	−13.2
Conservative	Allan Fish	1,416	28.3	+1.6
Respect	Zaki Mostufa	61	1.2	+1.2
Majority		563	11.3	
Turnout		5,008		
Labour gain from Liberal Democrats		Swing		

=== Saddleworth North ward ===
Saddleworth North ward
Party	Candidate	Votes	%	±%
Liberal Democrats	Alan Roughley	1,879	33.9	−20.0
Independent	Ken Hulme	1,628	29.4	+29.4
Conservative	Pam Byrne	1,223	22.1	−6.2
Labour	Aileen Bell	816	14.7	−10.9
Majority		251	4.5	−26.8
Turnout		5,546		
Liberal Democrats hold		Swing		

=== Saddleworth South ward ===
Saddleworth South ward
Party	Candidate	Votes	%	±%
Liberal Democrats	John McCann	2,731	47.0	−1.5
Conservative	Graham Sheldon	2,396	41.2	−2.0
Labour	Kaiser Rehman	685	5.8	−6.0
Majority		335	5.2	−17.8
Turnout		5,812		
Liberal Democrats hold		Swing		

=== Saddleworth West and Lees ward ===
Saddleworth West and Lees ward
Party	Candidate	Votes	%	±%
Liberal Democrats	Barbara Beeley	2,625	48.7	−7.1
Labour	Paul Fryer	1,438	26.5	+8.9
Conservative	Derek Chadderton	1,340	22.0	−2.8
Majority		1,187	29.1	+0.2
Turnout		5,403		
Liberal Democrats hold		Swing		

=== St James ward ===
St James ward
Party	Candidate	Votes	%	±%
Liberal Democrats	Roger Hindle	1,595	39.4	−5.4
Labour	Nigel Newton	1,332	32.9	+10.9
Conservative	David Atherton	697	17.2	−0.9
England First	Andrew Clayton	425	10.5	−4.6
Majority		263	6.5	+16.2
Turnout		4,049		
Liberal Democrats hold		Swing		

=== St Marys ward ===
St Marys ward
Party	Candidate	Votes	%	±%
Labour	Ali Salamat	2,649	49.1	+12.3
Liberal Democrats	Ajawat Hussain	2,229	41.3	−14.7
Conservative	David Caddick	520	9.6	+2.4
Majority		420	7.8	
Turnout		5,398		
Labour gain from Independent		Swing		

=== Shaw ward ===
Shaw ward
Party	Candidate	Votes	%	±%
Liberal Democrats	Rod Blyth	2,233	47.5	−9.8
Conservative	Phelyp Bennet	1,454	30.9	+14.7
Labour	Dilys Fletcher	1,014	21.6	+10.0
Majority		779	16.6	−24.5
Turnout		4,701		
Liberal Democrats hold		Swing		

=== Waterhead ward ===
Waterhead ward
Party	Candidate	Votes	%	±%
Liberal Democrats	Lynne Thompson	1,774	39.4	−17.9
Labour	Joseph Fitzpatrick	1,582	35.1	+13.5
Conservative	Edna Wolstenhulme	655	14.5	+1.0
Independent	Stuart Allsopp	496	11.0	+3.4
Majority		192	4.3	−31.4
Turnout		4,507		
Liberal Democrats hold		Swing		

=== Werneth ward ===
Werneth ward
Party	Candidate	Votes	%	±%
Labour	Shoab Akhtar	2,963	58.5	+1.0
Conservative	Basit Shah	1,493	29.5	+20.5
Liberal Democrats	Keith Begley	535	10.6	−22.9
Independent	Koddus Ali	73	1.4	+1.4
Majority		1,470	29.0	+5.0
Turnout		5,064		
Labour hold		Swing		
