= 2010 Milton Keynes Council election =

2010 UK local government election

The 2010 Milton Keynes Council election took place on 6 May 2010 to elect members of Milton Keynes Unitary Council in Buckinghamshire, England. One third of the council – the 17 seats contested in the 2006 election – was up for election and the council, which totalled 51 seats, remained under no overall control. An extra seat in Stony Stratford was also contested.

After the election, the composition of the council was:

- Liberal Democrat 24 (+3)
- Conservative 17 (–3)
- Labour 9
- Independent 1

== Election result ==
The Liberal Democrats won seats in Linford South, Linford North and Walton Park from the Conservative Party, despite the Conservatives' victory in both of the borough's newly formed Milton Keynes South and Milton Keynes North constituencies in the 2010 general election.

Milton Keynes local election result 2010
Party	Seats	Gains	Losses	Net gain/loss	Seats %	Votes %	Votes	+/−
Liberal Democrats	9	3	0	+3	50.0	30.2	28,650	+0.1%
Conservative	5	0	3	-3	44.4	33.5	31,887	-6.7%
Labour	3	0	0	0	16.7	24.9	23,625	+2.8%
UKIP	0	0	0	0	0	6.3	6,026	+2.6%
Green	0	0	0	0	0	4.3	4,115	+2.8%
BNP	0	0	0	0	0	0.2	222	+0.2%
