= 2010 Cheltenham Borough Council election =

2010 UK local government election

Results of the 2010 Cheltenham Borough Council election

The 2010 Cheltenham Council election took place on 6 May 2010 to elect members of Cheltenham Borough Council in Gloucestershire, England. Half of the council was up for election and the Liberal Democrats stayed in overall control of the council.

After the election, the composition of the council was

- Liberal Democrat 25
- Conservative 12
- People Against Bureaucracy 3

== Candidates ==
In total 64 candidates stood in the election for the 22 seats that were being contested. Among those defending seats were 2 Liberal Democrat cabinet members, the Conservative group leader Stuart Hutton and 2 People Against Bureaucracy councillors. Other candidates included 12 from the Green Party, a record high for the party in Cheltenham.

== Election result ==
The results saw the Liberal Democrats increase their majority on the council after gaining 4 seats from the Conservatives. Among the Conservative defeats to the Liberal Democrats was the Conservative group leader Stuart Hutton in Warden Hill ward and Conservative councillor David Hall who was defeated in Up Hatherley by 1 vote. The Liberal Democrat gains meant they held 25 seats after the election, as against 12 for the Conservatives and 3 People Against Bureaucracy councillors.

Cheltenham Borough Council Election Result 2010
Party	Seats	Gains	Losses	Net gain/loss	Seats %	Votes %	Votes	+/−
Liberal Democrats	16	4	0	+4	72.7	51.1	32,084	+6.2%
Conservative	4	0	4	-4	18.2	38.5	24,142	-7.3%
PAB	2	0	0	0	9.1	4.4	2,769	-1.3%
Green	0	0	0	0	0	3.6	2,278	+2.9%
Labour	0	0	0	0	0	2.3	1,456	-0.6%

== Ward results ==
All Saints
Party	Candidate	Votes	%	±%
Liberal Democrats	Charles Stewart*	1,420	52.4	−6.7
Conservative	Peter Christensen	937	34.6	+1.0
Labour	Diana Hale	190	7.0	+4.1
Green	Ian Lander	164	6.0	+1.6
Majority		483	17.8	−7.7
Turnout		2,711	63.8	+31.9
Liberal Democrats hold		Swing		

Battledown
Party	Candidate	Votes	%	±%
Conservative	Paul McLain*	1,563	52.1	−14.6
Liberal Democrats	Paul McCloskey	1,438	47.9	+18.8
Majority		125	4.2	−33.4
Turnout		3,001	73.6	+32.2
Conservative hold		Swing		

Benhall & The Reddings
Party	Candidate	Votes	%	±%
Liberal Democrats	Nigel Britter*	1,701	54.9	+5.6
Conservative	Chris Mason	1,241	40.1	−10.6
Green	Birgit Whitman	155	5.0	N/A
Majority		460	14.9	+13.5
Turnout		3,097	75.9	+29.8
Liberal Democrats hold		Swing		

Charlton Kings
Party	Candidate	Votes	%	±%
Liberal Democrats	Helena McCloskey	1,611	47.8	+0.4
Conservative	Chris Ryder*	1,537	45.6	−3.4
Green	Sarah Field	222	6.6	N/A
Majority		74	2.2	+0.5
Turnout		3,370	78.6	+32.6
Liberal Democrats gain from Conservative		Swing		

Charlton Park
Party	Candidate	Votes	%	±%
Conservative	Penny Hall*	1,641	52.0	−15.9
Liberal Democrats	Paul Baker	1,512	48.0	+15.9
Majority		129	4.1	−31.7
Turnout		3,153	78.3	+31.3
Conservative hold		Swing		

College
Party	Candidate	Votes	%	±%
Liberal Democrats	Garth Barnes*	1,664	54.3	−4.7
Conservative	Charlie Perkins	1,175	38.4	−2.6
Green	Victoria Angelo-Thomson	223	7.3	N/A
Majority		489	16.0	−2.1
Turnout		3,062	70.2	+30.7
Liberal Democrats hold		Swing		

Hesters Way
Party	Candidate	Votes	%	±%
Liberal Democrats	Simon Wheeler	1,767	68.1	+3.0
Conservative	Richard East	829	31.9	+2.6
Majority		938	36.1	+0.3
Turnout		2,596	51.8	+27.5
Liberal Democrats hold		Swing		

Lansdown
Party	Candidate	Votes	%	±%
Conservative	Barbara Driver*	1,361	49.5	−9.8
Liberal Democrats	Leone Meyer	1,186	43.1	+9.6
Green	John Heywood	205	7.4	N/A
Majority		175	6.4	−19.5
Turnout		2,752	60.2	+32.0
Conservative hold		Swing		

Leckhampton
Party	Candidate	Votes	%	±%
Liberal Democrats	Ian Bickerton	1,639	48.8	+4.8
Conservative	Tim Harman	1,506	44.8	−11.2
Green	Timothy Bonsor	216	6.4	N/A
Majority		133	4.0	−8.0
Turnout		3,361	81.4	+28.5
Liberal Democrats gain from Conservative		Swing		

Oakley (2)
Party	Candidate	Votes	%	±%
Liberal Democrats	Colin Hay*	1,174	51.7	+0.4
Liberal Democrats	Rowena Hay	1,066	46.9	−4.4
Conservative	Mireille Weller	646	28.4	−2.9
Conservative	Nathan Weller	583	25.7	−2.7
Labour	Brian Hughes	294	12.9	−4.5
Labour	Clive Harriss	282	12.4	−5.0
Majority		420	18.5	−1.5
Turnout		2,297	53.5	+23.4
Liberal Democrats hold		Swing		
Liberal Democrats hold		Swing		

Park
Party	Candidate	Votes	%	±%
Conservative	Rob Garnham*	1,917	51.0	−16.7
Liberal Democrats	Alexis Cassin	1,585	42.2	+9.9
Green	Jon Stubbings	257	6.8	N/A
Majority		332	8.8	−26.6
Turnout		3,759	71.9	+35.1
Conservative hold		Swing		

Pittville
Party	Candidate	Votes	%	±%
PAB	Diane Hibbert*	971	32.9	+13.2
Liberal Democrats	John Oates	966	32.7	−0.8
Conservative	Geraldine Beaty	863	29.2	−9.5
Green	Cathy Green	151	5.1	+1.1
Majority		5	0.2	−5.0
Turnout		2,951	69.0	+31.3
PAB hold		Swing		

Prestbury
Party	Candidate	Votes	%	±%
PAB	Les Godwin*	1,798	53.0	−2.1
Conservative	Terence Derry	842	24.8	−2.2
Liberal Democrats	Heiman Chan	754	22.2	+9.5
Majority		956	28.2	+0.2
Turnout		3,394	73.5	+31.8
PAB hold		Swing		

Springbank (2)
Party	Candidate	Votes	%	±%
Liberal Democrats	Peter Jeffries	1,688	64.3	−3.0
Liberal Democrats	John Morris*	1,626	61.9	−5.4
Conservative	Helen Smith	746	28.4	−4.3
Conservative	Leon Mekitarian	729	27.8	−4.9
Majority		880	33.5	−1.0
Turnout		2,650	54.3	+31.2
Liberal Democrats hold		Swing		
Liberal Democrats hold		Swing		

St. Mark's
Party	Candidate	Votes	%	±%
Liberal Democrats	Sandra Holliday*	1,517	55.3	+5.0
Conservative	Michael Bourne	804	29.3	−4.9
Labour	Rod Gay	290	10.6	+1.9
Green	Sherri Williams	131	4.8	−1.9
Majority		713	26.0	−0.4
Turnout		2,742	58.9	+32.5
Liberal Democrats hold		Swing		

St. Paul's
Party	Candidate	Votes	%	±%
Liberal Democrats	Jon Walklett	1,347	64.9	−0.8
Conservative	Greg Patton	518	25.0	−9.3
Green	Adrian Becker	210	10.1	N/A
Majority		829	40.0	+8.5
Turnout		2,075	44.1	+28.1
Liberal Democrats hold		Swing		

St. Peter's
Party	Candidate	Votes	%	±%
Liberal Democrats	Pat Thornton*	1,685	60.1	+2.2
Conservative	Emma Logan	847	30.2	−4.9
Labour	Robert Irons	271	9.7	+2.7
Majority		838	29.9	+7.1
Turnout		2,803	54.5	+28.5
Liberal Democrats hold		Swing		

Swindon Village
Party	Candidate	Votes	%	±%
Liberal Democrats	Paul Massey*	1,728	65.1	+7.7
Conservative	John Hardman	925	34.9	+16.4
Majority		803	30.3	−3.0
Turnout		2,653	59.0	+25.6
Liberal Democrats hold		Swing		

Up Hatherley
Party	Candidate	Votes	%	±%
Liberal Democrats	Andrew McKinlay**	1,470	46.0	−12.4
Conservative	David Hall*	1,469	46.0	+4.4
Labour	Neville Mozley	129	4.0	N/A
Green	Matthew Hodgkinson	125	3.9	N/A
Majority		1	0.0	−16.9
Turnout		3,193	76.6	+31.6
Liberal Democrats gain from Conservative		Swing		

Andrew McKinlay was a sitting councillor in St Paul's.

Warden Hill
Party	Candidate	Votes	%	±%
Liberal Democrats	Josephine Teakle	1,540	47.8	+17.9
Conservative	Stuart Hutton*	1,463	45.4	−24.7
Green	Adam Van Coevorden	219	6.8	N/A
Majority		77	2.4	−37.9
Turnout		3,222	73.1	+33.4
Liberal Democrats gain from Conservative		Swing		
