= 2010 Pendle Borough Council election =

2010 UK local government election

Map of the results of the 2010 Pendle Borough Council election. Labour in red, Conservatives in blue, Liberal Democrats in yellow and British National Party in dark blue. Wards in dark grey were not contested in 2010.

The 2010 Pendle Borough Council election took place on 6 May 2010 to elect members of Pendle Borough Council in Lancashire, England. One third of the council was up for election and the council stayed under no overall control.

After the election, the composition of the council was

- Conservative 17
- Liberal Democrat 16
- Labour 13
- British National Party 2
- Independent 1

== Background ==
Before the election the Liberal Democrats ran the council, but without a majority, with 18 seats. The Conservatives held 16 seats, Labour 11, the British National Party 2 and there was 1 independent. 16 seats were contested in the election with the Liberal Democrats defending 7, both the Conservative and Labour parties 4 each and the British National Party defended 1 seat.

== Election result ==
The results saw no party win a majority on the council after the Conservatives gained a seat to become the largest party on the council with 17 councillors. The Liberal Democrats dropped 3 to 16 seats, while Labour gained 2 seats to move to 13 councillors. Overall turnout in the election was 66.4%.

Following the election Conservative Mike Blomeley became leader of the council, after the council meeting saw the Conservative and Labour councillors support an all-party executive. The Liberal Democrats rejected this and refused to serve on the council executive, as they opposed giving Labour any power over housing decisions.

Pendle local election result 2010
Party	Seats	Gains	Losses	Net gain/loss	Seats %	Votes %	Votes	+/−
Labour	6	2	0	+2	37.5	28.0	11,415	+5.0%
Conservative	5	1	0	+1	31.3	34.1	13,881	-6.4%
Liberal Democrats	4	0	3	-3	25.0	29.3	11,922	-0.2%
BNP	1	0	0	0	6.3	8.0	3,258	+3.2%
England First	0	0	0	0	0	0.7	279	+0.7%

== Ward results ==
Barrowford
Party	Candidate	Votes	%	±%
Conservative	Jonathan Eyre	1,563	55.0	−12.3
Labour	Sue Nike	906	31.9	+7.5
Liberal Democrats	Donna Caley	372	13.1	+4.8
Majority		657	23.1	−19.9
Turnout		2,841	70.3	+27.9
Conservative hold		Swing		

Boulsworth
Party	Candidate	Votes	%	±%
Conservative	George Askew	1,487	48.0	
Liberal Democrats	Thomas James	665	21.5	
Labour	Gerry McCabe	647	20.9	
BNP	Jane Mulligan	300	9.7	
Majority		822	26.5	
Turnout		3,099	74.2	+25.8
Conservative hold		Swing		

Bradley
Party	Candidate	Votes	%	±%
Labour	Mohammed Iqbal	1,386	48.4	−5.7
Liberal Democrats	Tanzil Ahmed	816	28.5	+1.4
Conservative	Tim Eyre	381	13.3	−5.5
England First	David Geddes	279	9.7	+9.7
Majority		570	19.9	−7.1
Turnout		2,862	62.1	+22.8
Labour hold		Swing		

Brierfield
Party	Candidate	Votes	%	±%
Labour	Mohammed Arshad	1,152	42.8	−4.4
Conservative	Abdul Hussain	759	28.2	−6.4
Liberal Democrats	Pervaz Afzal	403	15.0	−3.2
BNP	Lee Karmer	379	14.1	+14.1
Majority		393	14.6	+2.0
Turnout		2,693	73.4	+23.7
Labour gain from Liberal Democrats		Swing		

Clover Hill
Party	Candidate	Votes	%	±%
Labour	Kathleen Shore	777	32.3	−5.4
Liberal Democrats	James Wood	720	29.9	−2.3
Conservative	Janice Taylor	588	24.4	−5.6
BNP	John Rowe	323	13.4	+13.4
Majority		57	2.4	−3.1
Turnout		2,408	63.9	+20.5
Labour gain from Liberal Democrats		Swing		

Coates
Party	Candidate	Votes	%	±%
Liberal Democrats	Lindsay Gaskell	1,280	45.4	−0.1
Conservative	Keith Bailey	915	32.5	−11.1
Labour	Richard Smith	337	12.0	+1.2
BNP	Malcolm Foster	286	10.1	+10.1
Majority		365	13.0	+11.1
Turnout		2,818	68.1	+32.4
Liberal Democrats hold		Swing		

Craven
Party	Candidate	Votes	%	±%
Liberal Democrats	David Whipp	1,372	47.6	+22.1
Conservative	Jenny Purcell	1,175	40.7	+15.8
Labour	John Pope	337	11.7	+8.4
Majority		197	6.8	
Turnout		2,884	68.2	+19.3
Liberal Democrats hold		Swing		

Earby
Party	Candidate	Votes	%	±%
Conservative	Chris Tennant	1,684	50.9	−18.6
Liberal Democrats	Jackie Taylforth	687	20.8	+2.7
Labour	Robert Oliver	488	14.7	+2.3
BNP	James Jackman	450	13.6	+13.6
Majority		997	30.1	−21.3
Turnout		3,309	69.2	+30.2
Conservative hold		Swing		

Horsfield
Party	Candidate	Votes	%	±%
Conservative	Neil Butterworth	828	34.6	−14.6
Liberal Democrats	Sharon Davies	814	34.0	−3.2
Labour	David Johns	435	18.2	+4.6
BNP	Julie Fairless	314	13.1	+13.1
Majority		14	0.6	−11.4
Turnout		2,391	60.1	+25.8
Conservative gain from Liberal Democrats		Swing		

Marsden
Party	Candidate	Votes	%	±%
BNP	Brian Parker	502	30.5	−8.6
Labour	David Foat	474	28.8	+7.8
Conservative	Jack Gregory	448	27.3	−4.9
Liberal Democrats	Aaron Whitehall-Pain	220	13.4	+5.6
Majority		28	1.7	−5.2
Turnout		1,644	62.4	+21.3
BNP hold		Swing		

Reedley
Party	Candidate	Votes	%	±%
Conservative	Pauline McCormick	1,492	49.2	−21.9
Labour	Robert Allen	839	27.7	+11.5
Liberal Democrats	Kenneth Massey	699	23.1	+10.4
Majority		653	21.6	−33.3
Turnout		3,030	72.7	+29.9
Conservative hold		Swing		

Southfield
Party	Candidate	Votes	%	±%
Labour	Sheena Dunn	908	38.1	+1.5
Liberal Democrats	Judith Robinson	754	31.6	+0.7
Conservative	Paul McKenna	724	30.3	−2.3
Majority		154	6.5	+2.5
Turnout		2,386	59.8	+22.7
Labour hold		Swing		

Vivary Bridge
Party	Candidate	Votes	%	±%
Liberal Democrats	David Clegg	832	34.2	−1.4
Conservative	Joe Cooney	711	29.2	+0.7
Labour	Anthony Hargreaves	514	21.1	+7.4
BNP	Veronica Cullen	376	15.5	−6.6
Majority		121	5.0	−2.0
Turnout		2,433	59.6	+25.8
Liberal Democrats hold		Swing		

Walverden
Party	Candidate	Votes	%	±%
Labour	Julie Henderson	697	38.3	−5.7
Liberal Democrats	Asghar Ali	632	34.8	+5.9
Conservative	Barbara King	489	26.9	−0.2
Majority		65	3.6	−11.6
Turnout		1,818	68.0	+16.4
Labour hold		Swing		

Waterside
Party	Candidate	Votes	%	±%
Liberal Democrats	Dorothy Lord	984	44.1	+4.2
Conservative	John Hall	487	21.8	+4.7
Labour	Anthony Martin	430	19.3	+7.1
BNP	Ian Robinson	328	14.7	−12.6
Majority		497	22.3	+9.7
Turnout		2,229	58.1	+25.0
Liberal Democrats hold		Swing		

Whitefield
Party	Candidate	Votes	%	±%
Labour	Asjad Mahmood	1,088	57.0	+27.0
Liberal Democrats	Rashid Quadri	672	35.2	−29.8
Conservative	Margaret Beckett	150	7.9	+2.9
Majority		416	21.8	
Turnout		1,910	73.2	+8.3
Labour hold		Swing		
