= 2010 Stratford-on-Avon District Council election =

2010 UK local government election

Results of the 2010 Stratford-on-Avon District Council election

The 2010 Stratford-on-Avon District Council election took place on 6 May 2010 to elect members of Stratford-on-Avon District Council in Warwickshire, England. One third of the council was up for election and the Conservative Party stayed in overall control of the council.

After the election, the composition of the council was

- Conservative 30
- Liberal Democrat 20
- Independent 3

== Background ==
Before the election the Conservatives controlled the council with 29 seats, compared to 19 Liberal Democrats and 3 independents, with a further 2 seats being vacant. 20 seats were contested in the election by a total of 58 candidates.

== Election result ==
The results saw the Conservatives hold control of the council after winning 11 of the 20 seats contested, compared to 8 seats for the Liberal Democrats and 1 independent. The Conservatives gained a seat in Kinwarton from the Liberal Democrats, but lost another seat back to the Liberal Democrats in Stratford Alveston to leave the political balance unchanged.

Stratford-on-Avon local election result 2010
Party	Seats	Gains	Losses	Net gain/loss	Seats %	Votes %	Votes	+/−
Conservative	11	1	1	0	55.0	47.8	24,712	-3.2%
Liberal Democrats	8	1	1	0	40.0	36.6	18,891	-3.3%
Independent	1	0	0	0	5.0	7.6	3,931	+4.2%
Labour	0	0	0	0	0	6.6	3,396	+2.9%
Green	0	0	0	0	0	1.4	715	+0.8%

== Ward results ==
Alcester
Party	Candidate	Votes	%	±%
Liberal Democrats	Susan Juned	1,651	49.6	+8.2
Conservative	Yvonne Hine	1,438	43.2	−11.9
Labour	Barry Doherty	241	7.2	+3.7
Majority		213	6.4	
Turnout		3,330	68.8	+24.9
Liberal Democrats hold		Swing		

Bidford and Salford
Party	Candidate	Votes	%	±%
Liberal Democrats	Daren Pemberton	1,448	38.3	−3.0
Conservative	Maurice Howse	1,354	35.8	+35.8
Independent	Michael Atkins	551	14.6	−37.4
Labour	Matthew Stephens	316	8.4	+1.7
Green	Karen Varga	109	2.9	+2.9
Majority		94	2.5	
Turnout		3,778	69.5	+36.6
Liberal Democrats hold		Swing		

Brailes
Party	Candidate	Votes	%	±%
Conservative	Philip Seccombe	976	70.1	+15.0
Liberal Democrats	Laura Nelson	416	29.9	−15.0
Majority		560	40.2	+30.1
Turnout		1,392	77.6	+19.6
Conservative hold		Swing		

Harbury
Party	Candidate	Votes	%	±%
Liberal Democrats	Richard Tonge	1,461	52.2	+1.9
Conservative	Richard Hamburger	1,340	47.8	−1.9
Majority		121	4.3	+3.7
Turnout		2,801	73.8	+28.3
Liberal Democrats hold		Swing		

Henley
Party	Candidate	Votes	%	±%
Conservative	Jeremy Jones	1,664	65.1	−9.5
Liberal Democrats	Karyl Rees	606	23.7	+10.0
Labour	John Hartigan	285	11.2	+11.2
Majority		1,058	41.4	−19.5
Turnout		2,555	70.1	+26.1
Conservative hold		Swing		

Kinwarton
Party	Candidate	Votes	%	±%
Conservative	Michael Gittus	675	52.2	+5.5
Liberal Democrats	Nina Knapman	565	43.7	−9.6
Labour	Jeffrey Kenner	54	4.2	+4.2
Majority		110	8.5	
Turnout		1,294	74.8	+29.0
Conservative gain from Liberal Democrats		Swing		

Long Compton
Party	Candidate	Votes	%	±%
Conservative	Stephen Gray	859	63.3	−9.0
Liberal Democrats	Virginia Mason	499	36.7	+9.0
Majority		360	26.5	−18.1
Turnout		1,358	75.5	+28.1
Conservative hold		Swing		

Long Itchington
Party	Candidate	Votes	%	±%
Conservative	Robert Stevens	901	64.6	−5.9
Liberal Democrats	Michael Pugh	494	35.4	+20.7
Majority		407	29.2	−26.6
Turnout		1,395	73.3	+29.8
Conservative hold		Swing		

Quinton
Party	Candidate	Votes	%	±%
Conservative	Michael Brain	959	67.3	−6.1
Liberal Democrats	Jeffery Dench	467	32.7	+32.7
Majority		492	34.5	−12.4
Turnout		1,426	71.5	+24.9
Conservative hold		Swing		

Sambourne
Party	Candidate	Votes	%	±%
Conservative	Justin Kerridge	696	64.7	−9.1
Liberal Democrats	Clive Rickhards	380	35.3	+9.1
Majority		316	29.4	−18.1
Turnout		1,076	73.4	+28.0
Conservative hold		Swing		

Shipston
Party	Candidate	Votes	%	±%
Liberal Democrats	Philip Vial	1,376	48.0	−0.7
Conservative	Clive Smithard	1,108	38.6	−9.4
Labour	Christopher Aston	315	11.0	+7.7
Green	Robert Ballantyne	70	2.4	+2.4
Majority		268	9.3	+8.6
Turnout		2,869	71.0	+22.4
Liberal Democrats hold		Swing		

Snitterfield
Party	Candidate	Votes	%	±%
Conservative	Helen Hayter	940	70.0	−8.4
Liberal Democrats	John Insoll	403	30.0	+8.4
Majority		537	40.0	−16.8
Turnout		1,343	74.9	+28.6
Conservative hold		Swing		

Southam
Party	Candidate	Votes	%	±%
Conservative	Jennifer Ellard	1,631	46.5	−5.6
Liberal Democrats	Helena Knight	977	27.9	+4.7
Labour	Peter Thomas	900	25.7	+1.0
Majority		654	18.6	−8.8
Turnout		3,508	69.6	+36.5
Conservative hold		Swing		

Stratford Alveston
Party	Candidate	Votes	%	±%
Liberal Democrats	Ian Fradgley	1,938	45.2	−3.9
Conservative	Stuart Beese	1,682	39.2	−3.1
Independent	Michael Crutchley	378	8.8	+8.8
Labour	Samuel Hargreaves	288	6.7	+6.7
Majority		256	6.0	−0.8
Turnout		4,286	74.8	+26.5
Liberal Democrats gain from Conservative		Swing		

Stratford Avenue and New Town
Party	Candidate	Votes	%	±%
Liberal Democrats	Clive Thomas	1,531	39.0	−8.6
Conservative	Ian Hurst	1,423	36.2	−9.8
Independent	Juliet Short	620	15.8	+15.8
Labour	Stephen Troup	352	9.0	+2.7
Majority		108	2.8	+1.2
Turnout		3,926	65.6	+28.1
Liberal Democrats hold		Swing		

Stratford Guild and Hathaway
Party	Candidate	Votes	%	±%
Liberal Democrats	Jenny Fradgley	1,876	45.0	−2.3
Conservative	Irving David	1,473	35.3	−4.3
Independent	William Lowe	364	8.7	+8.7
Labour	David Talbot	315	7.6	+2.0
Green	Hugh Chatwin	144	3.5	−4.1
Majority		403	9.7	+2.0
Turnout		4,172	70.7	+28.7
Liberal Democrats hold		Swing		

Studley
Party	Candidate	Votes	%	±%
Liberal Democrats	Hazel Wright	1,755	55.4	−3.6
Conservative	William McCarthy	1,085	34.2	−1.3
Labour	Jacqueline Abbott	330	10.4	+5.0
Majority		670	21.1	−2.4
Turnout		3,170	69.1	+28.5
Liberal Democrats hold		Swing		

Tanworth
Party	Candidate	Votes	%	±%
Conservative	Peter Oakley	1,723	73.8	−12.8
Liberal Democrats	Eric Holder	613	26.2	+12.8
Majority		1,110	47.5	−25.8
Turnout		2,336	73.1	+31.6
Conservative hold		Swing		

Vale of the Red Horse
Party	Candidate	Votes	%	±%
Conservative	Gillian Roache	1,048	70.7	−9.4
Liberal Democrats	Kenneth Osborne	435	29.3	+9.4
Majority		613	41.3	−18.8
Turnout		1,483	77.9	+28.3
Conservative hold		Swing		

Wellesbourne
Party	Candidate	Votes	%	±%
Independent	Roger Wright	2,018	48.7	+48.7
Conservative	Daniel Kendall	1,737	41.9	−8.2
Green	Jessica Pinson	392	9.5	+9.5
Majority		281	6.8	
Turnout		4,147	75.4	+30.4
Independent hold		Swing		
