= 2010 Watford Borough Council election =

2010 UK local government election

2010 local election results in Watford

Elections to Watford Borough Council were held on 6 May 2010. Three years in every four, a third of the council (13 councillors) retires and elections are held (in the fourth year, elections are held for county councillors). The council election was held on the same day as the national General Election, when the Labour Party government lost power and the Watford parliamentary constituency was won by the Conservative Party.

In this council election, the Labour Party gained one seat and the Liberal Democrats lost one. However. the Liberal Democrats remained firmly in control of the council.

After the election, the composition of the council was:

- Liberal Democrat 25
- Conservative 4
- Labour 4
- Green 3

== Council election result ==
Watford local election result 2008
Party	Seats	Gains	Losses	Net gain/loss	Seats %	Votes %	Votes	+/−
Liberal Democrats	7	0	1	-1	58.3	38.0	16,361	
Conservative	2	0	0	-	16.7	30.0	12,934	
Labour	2	1	0	+1	16.7	25.0	10,769	
Green	1	-	-	-	8.3	7.1	3,040	

== Ward results ==
Callowland
Party	Candidate	Votes	%	±%
Green	Ann Lovejoy	930	27.6	
Liberal Democrats	Tricia Gollop	859	25.5	
Labour	Guru Awasthi	854	25.4	
Conservative	Guy Miller	723	21.5	
Majority		71	2.1	
Turnout		3366	61	
Green hold		Swing		

Central
Party	Candidate	Votes	%	±%
Liberal Democrats	Christopher Leslie	1,211	36.8	
Labour	Ian Lowery	1,140	34.6	
Conservative	Richard Bamford	731	22.2	
Green	Caryn Argun	212	6.4	
Majority		71	2.2	
Turnout		3294	54.3	
Liberal Democrats hold		Swing		

Holywell
Party	Candidate	Votes	%	±%
Labour	Jackie Connal	1,495	43.3	
Liberal Democrats	Janet Baddeley	1,200	34.7	
Conservative	Carole Bamford	639	18.5	
Green	Alison Wiesner	121	3.5	
Majority		295	8.6	
Turnout		3455	54.8	
Labour gain from Liberal Democrats		Swing		

Leggatts
Party	Candidate	Votes	%	±%
Conservative	Stephen Johnson	1,098	31.5	
Labour	Ahsan Khan	995	28.5	
Liberal Democrats	Zaheer Ahmed	935	26.8	
Green	Ian Brandon	459	13.2	
Majority		103	3.0	
Turnout		3487	64.3	
Conservative hold		Swing		

Meriden
Party	Candidate	Votes	%	±%
Liberal Democrats	Kareen Hastrick	1,185	33.8	
Conservative	Pamela Bell	1,156	33.0	
Labour	Geoffrey O'Connell	992	28.3	
Green	Michael Argun	168	4.8	
Majority		29	0.8	
Turnout		3501	63.3	
Liberal Democrats hold		Swing		

Nascot
Party	Candidate	Votes	%	±%
Liberal Democrats	Mark Watkin	1,779	43.5	
Conservative	Miles Bennington	1,610	39.3	
Labour	Joanna Grindrod	509	12.4	
Green	Sally Ivins	196	4.8	
Majority		169	4.2	
Turnout		4094	72.2	
Liberal Democrats hold		Swing		

Oxhey
Party	Candidate	Votes	%	±%
Liberal Democrats	Iain Sharpe	1,924	53.6	
Conservative	Sarah Son	1,044	29.1	
Labour	Ann Akubue	482	13.4	
Green	Christine Chandler	141	3.9	
Majority		880	24.5	
Turnout		3591	69.1	
Liberal Democrats hold		Swing		

Park
Party	Candidate	Votes	%	±%
Conservative	Malcolm Meerabux	2,006	45.7	
Liberal Democrats	Peter Jeffree	1,645	37.4	
Labour	Mike Jones	586	13.3	
Green	Alex MacGregor Mason	156	3.6	
Majority		361	8.3	
Turnout		4393	74.8	
Conservative hold		Swing		

Stanborough
Party	Candidate	Votes	%	±%
Liberal Democrats	Keith Crout	1,687	47.4	
Conservative	Linda Topping	1,072	30.12	
Labour	Frederick Oshunniyi	643	18.1	
Green	Kevin Pettifer	157	4.4	
Majority		615	17.3	
Turnout		3559	67	
Liberal Democrats hold		Swing		

Tudor
Party	Candidate	Votes	%	±%
Liberal Democrats	Lindsey Scudder	1,352	39.6	
Conservative	Richard Southern	1,220	35.7	+2.1
Labour	Mark Xerri	685	20.1	
Green	Clare Pitkin	159	4.7	
Majority		132	3.9	
Turnout		3416	72.1	
Liberal Democrats hold		Swing		

Vicarage
Party	Candidate	Votes	%	±%
Labour	Jagtar Singh Dhindsa	1,652	45.5	
Liberal Democrats	Bobby Amin	1,133	31.2	
Conservative	David Ealey	642	17.7	
Green	Helen Wynne	201	5.5	
Majority		519	14.3	
Turnout		3628	64.7	
Labour gain from Liberal Democrats		Swing		

Woodside
Party	Candidate	Votes	%	±%
Liberal Democrats	Karen Collett	1,451	43.7	
Conservative	Joseph Harrison	993	29.9	
Labour	John Young	736	22.2	
Green	Iain Wadey	140	4.2	
Majority		458	13.8	
Turnout		3320	63.5	
Liberal Democrats hold		Swing		

== Mayoral election ==
2010 Watford mayoral election
- 6 May 2010
- Turnout: 41,758 (65.2%)
	First party	Second party
Candidate	Dorothy Thornhill	Stephen Johnson
Party	Liberal Democrats	Conservative
First round	19,153 (45.9%)	10,403 (24.9%)
Final round	23,429 (67.1%)	11,508 (32.9%)
	Third party	Fourth party
Candidate	Nigel Bell	Alex MacGregor Mason
Party	Labour	Green
First round	10,029 (24.0%)	2,173 (5.2%)
Final round	Eliminated	Eliminated
Mayor before election
Dorothy Thornhill
Liberal Democrat
Elected Mayor
Dorothy Thornhill
Liberal Democrat

Incumbent Liberal Democrat mayor Dorothy Thornhill ran for re-election. In April 2010, three parties announced their candidates to challenge Thornhill. The Conservative Party selected Stephen Johnson, borough councillor for Leggatts, as their candidate, while the Labour Party selected councillor Nigel Bell of Holywell as their candidate. The Green Party selected Alex MacGregor Mason as their candidate.

Thornhill won re-election for her third term with 67.1% of the vote in the final round, while the Conservative Party candidate Stephen Johnson finished second with 32.9% of the vote in the second round. The Labour Party's Nigel Bell and the Green Party's Alex MacGregor Mason were eliminated after finishing third and fourth in the first round respectively.

2010 Watford mayoral election
Party	Candidate	1st round		2nd round			1st round votesTransfer votes, 2nd round
Party	Candidate	Total	Of round	Transfers	Total	Of round	1st round votesTransfer votes, 2nd round
Liberal Democrats	Dorothy Thornhill	19,153	45.9%	4,276	23,429	67.1%	
Conservative	Stephen Johnson	10,403	24.9%	1,105	11,508	32.9%	
Labour	Nigel Bell	10,029	24.0%				
Green	Alex MacGregor Mason	2,173	5.2%				
Turnout		41,758					
Liberal Democrats hold							
