= 2010 Bury Metropolitan Borough Council election =

2010 UK local government election

Results of the 2010 Bury Metropolitan Borough Council election

Elections to Bury Council took place on 6 May 2010. One third of the Council was up for election and the Conservative Party lost overall control of the Council.

17 seats were contested. The Labour Party won 11 seats, the Conservatives won 4 seats, and the Liberal Democrats won 2 seats

After the election, the total composition of the council was as follows:

- Labour 20
- Conservative 23
- Liberal Democrats 8

== Election result ==
Bury local election result 2010
Party	Seats	Gains	Losses	Net gain/loss	Seats %	Votes %	Votes	+/−
Labour	11	4	0	+4		35.9	35,779	+10.3
Conservative	4	0	3	-3		35.7	35,584	-9.3
Liberal Democrats	2	0	1	-1		22.3	22,196	+4.4
BNP	0	0	0			4.2	4,164	-4.6
Green	0	0	0	0	0	1.0	956	+1.0
English Democrat	0	0	0	0	0	0.2	186	+0.0
Independent	0	0	0	0	0	0.7	726	-1.7

== Ward results ==
Besses
Party	Candidate	Votes	%	±%
Labour	Kenneth Audin	2,076	42.1	+1.0
Liberal Democrats	Julie Baum	1,262	25.6	+2.3
Conservative	Ian Silvester	1,109	22.5	+0.3
BNP	Jennifer Jamieson	302	6.1	+6.1
English Democrat	Stephen Morris	186	3.8	−9.6
Majority		814	16.5	−1.3
Turnout		4,935	59.9	
Labour hold		Swing		

Church
Party	Candidate	Votes	%	±%
Conservative	Bob Biddy	2,639	43.1	−20.8
Labour	Susan Southworth	1,700	27.7	+6.9
Liberal Democrats	Jim Eagle	1,197	19.5	+11.9
BNP	Julia Kay	376	6.1	−1.6
Independent	Ian Hayes	213	3.5	+3.5
Majority		939	15.3	−27.8
Turnout		6,125	71.1	
Conservative hold		Swing		

East
Party	Candidate	Votes	%	±%
Labour	Trevor Holt	2,103	46.2	+1.3
Conservative	Azmat Hussain	1,294	28.4	−11.6
Liberal Democrats	Lynda Arthur	714	15.7	+0.7
BNP	Thomas Nuttall	436	9.6	+9.6
Majority		809	17.8	+12.9
Turnout		4,547	57.7	
Labour hold		Swing		

Elton
Party	Candidate	Votes	%	±%
Conservative	Michael Hankey	2,143	38.0	−23.2
Labour	James Frith	1,928	34.1	+8.6
Liberal Democrats	Robert Sloss	1,137	20.1	+6.8
BNP	Stewart Clough	437	7.7	+7.7
Majority		215	3.8	−31.9
Turnout		5,645	66.1	
Conservative hold		Swing		

Holyrood
Party	Candidate	Votes	%	±%
Liberal Democrats	Tim Pickstone	2,779	47.1	−4.7
Labour	Ben Shatliff	1,773	30.1	+8.9
Conservative	Carl Curran	1,344	22.8	−4.2
Majority		1,006	17.1	−7.6
Turnout		5,896	66.5	
Liberal Democrats hold		Swing		

Moorside
Party	Candidate	Votes	%	±%
Labour	Sandra Walmsley	2,289	43.4	+2.7
Conservative	Peter Ashworth	1,528	29.0	−9.0
Liberal Democrats	Nissa Finney	804	15.2	+8.1
BNP	Phil Sedman	396	7.5	−2.6
Independent	Victor Hagan	133	2.5	−1.6
Green	Nicole Haydock	124	2.3	+2.3
Majority		761	14.4	+11.8
Turnout		5,274	58.0	
Labour gain from Conservative		Swing		

North Manor
Party	Candidate	Votes	%	±%
Conservative	James Taylor	3,277	53.1	−17.1
Liberal Democrats	Ewan Arthur	1,322	21.4	+12.6
Labour	Frank Shatliff	1,321	21.4	+6.4
Green	Glyn Heath	255	4.1	+4.1
Majority		1,955	31.6	−23.6
Turnout		6,175	75.4	
Conservative hold		Swing		

Pilkington Park
Party	Candidate	Votes	%	±%
Conservative	Bernie Vincent	2,589	24.7	
Conservative	Robert Caserta	2,530	24.2	
Labour	John Mallon	1,813	17.3	
Labour	Steve Perkins	1,649	15.7	
Liberal Democrats	Wayne Burrows	994	9.5	
Liberal Democrats	Joanne O'Hanlon	894	8.5	
Majority		59		
Majority		717		
Turnout		10,469	66.6	
Conservative hold		Swing		
Conservative hold		Swing		

Radcliffe East
Party	Candidate	Votes	%	±%
Labour	Nick Parnell	1,887	36.5	+6.9
Conservative	Catherine Berry	1,737	33.6	−11.6
Liberal Democrats	Mike Halsall	1,077	20.8	+10.8
BNP	Reg Norris	465	9.0	−6.2
Majority		150	2.9	
Turnout		5,166	60.5	
Labour gain from Conservative		Swing		

Radcliffe North
Party	Candidate	Votes	%	±%
Labour	Jane Lewis	2,176	38.4	+3.4
Conservative	Janice Cheetham	2,117	37.4	−8.4
Liberal Democrats	Kamran Islam	648	11.4	+5.3
Independent	George Ramsay	380	6.7	+6.7
BNP	Graham Tonkin	341	6.0	−7.1
Majority		59	1.0	
Turnout		5,662	63.9	
Labour gain from Conservative		Swing		

Radcliffe West
Party	Candidate	Votes	%	±%
Labour	Rishi Shori	1,970	41.4	−3.2
Conservative	Samantha Davies	1,345	28.3	+1.0
Liberal Democrats	Lynn Molloy	928	19.5	+12.9
BNP	Jean Purdy	509	10.7	−7.5
Majority		625	13.1	+10.0
Turnout		4,752	56.1	
Labour hold		Swing		

Ramsbottom
Party	Candidate	Votes	%	±%
Labour	Val Robinson	2,943	41.1	+14.2
Conservative	Ian Bevan	2,668	37.2	−24.9
Liberal Democrats	Paul Jenkins	1,298	18.1	+7.2
Green	Peter Mather	254	3.5	+3.5
Majority		275	3.8	
Turnout		7,163	69.3	
Labour hold		Swing		

Redvales
Party	Candidate	Votes	%	±%
Labour	Tamoor Tariq	2,357	42.1	+9.8
Conservative	Khalid Hussain	1,492	26.6	−16.8
Liberal Democrats	Tim Boaden	1,186	21.2	+12.3
BNP	Peter Hallows	565	10.1	+0.7
Majority		865	15.4	
Turnout		5,600	62.3	
Labour hold		Swing		

Sedgley
Party	Candidate	Votes	%	±%
Labour	Alan Quinn	2,173	35.7	+10.8
Liberal Democrats	Andrew Garner	2,001	32.9	−8.1
Conservative	Jonathan Grosskopf	1,913	31.4	+0.0
Majority		172	2.8	
Turnout		6,087	68.5	
Labour gain from Liberal Democrats		Swing		

St. Mary's
Party	Candidate	Votes	%	±%
Liberal Democrats	Donal O'Hanlon	2,053	38.1	−5.3
Labour	Noel Bayley	1,754	32.5	−1.1
Conservative	Raymond Soloman	1,264	23.4	+0.4
Green	George Heron	323	6.0	+6.0
Majority		299	5.5	−4.3
Turnout		5,394	64.5	
Liberal Democrats hold		Swing		

Tottington
Party	Candidate	Votes	%	±%
Conservative	Iain Gartside	2,521	45.3	−11.7
Labour	Simon Carter	1,608	28.9	+8.3
Liberal Democrats	David Foss	1,098	19.7	+4.4
BNP	Brian Jepson	337	6.0	−1.0
Majority		913	16.4	−20.0
Turnout		5,564	69.1	
Conservative hold		Swing		

Unsworth
Party	Candidate	Votes	%	±%
Labour	Ann Audin	2,259	44.1	+8.1
Conservative	Bev Sullivan	2,074	40.4	−15.9
Liberal Democrats	Theo Tymczyna	794	15.5	+7.8
Majority		185	3.7	
Turnout		5,127	68.4	
Labour gain from Conservative		Swing		
