= 2010 Rochdale Metropolitan Borough Council election =

2010 UK local government election

Elections to Rochdale Metropolitan Borough Council in Greater Manchester, England were held on 6 May 2010, the same day as the general election, with one-third of the council facing the voters. The Liberal Democrats lost control of the council.

After the election, the composition of the council was:

- Liberal Democrat 26
- Labour 22
- Conservative 11

== Election result ==
Rochdale local election result 2010
Party	Seats	Gains	Losses	Net gain/loss	Seats %	Votes %	Votes	+/−
Labour	9	3	0	+3		36.9	34,014	+5.6
Liberal Democrats	7	0	5	-5		31.6	29,155	-4.5
Conservative	4	2	0	+2		25.9	23,925	-0.6
BNP	0	0	0	0		1.9	1,723	+1.1
Respect	0	0	0	0		1.2	1,152	+1.2
Green	0	0	0	0		0.5	467	+0.5
Independent	0	0	0	0		1.2	1,839	+0.8

== Ward results ==
=== Balderstone and Kirkholt ward ===
Balderstone and Kirkholt ward
Party	Candidate	Votes	%	±%
Liberal Democrats	Dale Mulgrew	1,400	37.2	+0.5
Labour	Stefan Cholewka	1094	29.1	−12.0
Conservative	Michael Butler	755	20.1	−9.3
Independent	Darren Pedley	515	13.7	+13.7
Majority		306	8.1	+5.4
Turnout		3,764		
Liberal Democrats hold		Swing		

=== Bamford ward ===
Bamford ward
Party	Candidate	Votes	%	±%
Conservative	Ian Duckworth	2,269	43.5	−12.7
Liberal Democrats	William Hobhouse	1,934	37.1	+5.7
Labour	James Brown	1,010	19.4	+7.1
Majority		335	6.4	−5.9
Turnout		5,213		
Conservative gain from Liberal Democrats		Swing		

=== Castleton ward ===
Castleton ward
Party	Candidate	Votes	%	±%
Liberal Democrats	Peter John Davison	1,360	29.8	−25.9
Labour	Jean Hornby	1305	28.6	+3.0
Independent	Francis Wilford Salt	763	16.7	+16.7
Conservative	Ronnie Crossley	737	16.1	−2.7
BNP	Allan Howard Jones	400	8.8	+8.8
Majority		55	1.2	−28.8
Turnout		4,565		
Liberal Democrats hold		Swing		

=== Central Rochdale ward ===
Central Rochdale ward
Party	Candidate	Votes	%	±%
Labour	Sultan Ali	2,334	51.2	+11.7
Liberal Democrats	Khalid Mahmood	1676	36.8	−15.1
Conservative	Roger Howarth	550	12.1	+3.5
Majority		658	14.4	
Turnout		4,560		
Labour hold		Swing		

=== East Middleton ward ===
East Middleton ward
Party	Candidate	Votes	%	±%
Labour	June West	2,180	46.9	+1.1
Liberal Democrats	Terrance William Smith	1298	28.0	+5.1
Conservative	David Harris	1166	25.1	−4.0
Majority		882	19.0	+0.1
Turnout		4,644		
Labour hold		Swing		

=== Healey ward ===
Healey ward
Party	Candidate	Votes	%	±%
Liberal Democrats	Hilary Josephine Rogers	1,718	33.5	
Conservative	Andrew Neilson	1,546	30.1	
Labour	Jim Moran	1,529	29.8	
Liberal Democrats	Alan Taylor	1,355	26.4	
Conservative	Keith Taylor	1,046	20.4	
Labour	Margret Taylor	1,001	19.5	
Green	Ian Andrews	467	9.1	
Green	Samir Chatterjee	260	5.1	
Turnout		5128		
Liberal Democrats hold		Swing		
Conservative hold		Swing		

=== Hopwood Hall ward ===
Hopwood Hall ward
Party	Candidate	Votes	%	±%
Labour	Carol Elizabeth Wardle	2,301	49.3	−4.4
Conservative	Peter Burt	1130	24.2	−6.6
Liberal Democrats	James Anthony MacSparran	744	15.9	−0.4
BNP	Donald Ford	496	10.6	+10.6
Majority		1,171	25.1	+2.3
Turnout		4,671		
Labour hold		Swing		

=== Kingsway ward ===
Kingsway ward
Party	Candidate	Votes	%	±%
Labour	Daalat Ali	2,245	49.4	+7.7
Liberal Democrats	Doreen Morton	1,690	37.0	−9.5
Conservative	Mudassar Razzaq	624	13.7	+2.0
Majority		555	12.4	
Turnout		4,559		
Labour gain from Liberal Democrats		Swing		

=== Littleborough Lakeside ward ===
Littleborough Lakeside ward
Party	Candidate	Votes	%	±%
Conservative	Stephanie Mills	1,928	40.2	−1.1
Liberal Democrats	Pauline Maguire	1,594	33.2	−11.6
Labour	John Hartley	1,277	26.6	+12.8
Majority		334	7.0	
Turnout		4,799		
Conservative gain from Liberal Democrats		Swing		

=== Milkstone and Deeplish ward ===
Milkstone and Deeplish ward
Party	Candidate	Votes	%	±%
Liberal Democrats	Shah Wazir	1,774	37.2	−16.5
Labour	Mohammed Zaman	1704	35.7	+12.8
Respect	Javed Iqbal	999	20.9	+20.9
Conservative	John Kershaw	293	6.1	+1.0
Majority		70	1.5	−29.4
Turnout		4,770		
Liberal Democrats hold		Swing		

=== Milnrow and Newhey ward ===
Milnrow and Newhey ward
Party	Candidate	Votes	%	±%
Liberal Democrats	Andrew John Kelly	1,905	38.3	−9.9
Labour	Martin Eric Rodgers	1557	31.3	+6.3
Conservative	Catherine Marie Merrick	1364	27.4	+0.6
Respect	Joyce Kathleen Burden	153	3.1	+3.1
Majority		193	3.9	−17.5
Turnout		4,979		
Liberal Democrats hold		Swing		

=== Norden ward ===
Norden ward
Party	Candidate	Votes	%	±%
Liberal Democrats	Wera Hobhouse	2,240	42.1	+13.2
Conservative	Maureen Patricia Sullivan	1927	36.2	−11.8
Labour	Ann Marie Courtney	839	15.8	+6.6
BNP	Arthur Hughes	319	6.0	−7.9
Majority		313	5.9	
Turnout		5,325		
Liberal Democrats hold		Swing		

=== North Heywood ward ===
North Heywood ward
Party	Candidate	Votes	%	±%
Liberal Democrats	Peter Rush	2,028	51.7	+6.9
Labour	Mervyn Clive Simpson	1328	33.8	−4.5
Conservative	David Garnett	568	14.5	−2.4
Majority		700	17.8	+11.2
Turnout		3,924		
Liberal Democrats hold		Swing		

=== North Middleton ward ===
North Middleton ward
Party	Candidate	Votes	%	±%
Labour	Jonathan Paul Burns	2,237	51.5	+9.2
Conservative	Bernard Thomas Braiden	1069	24.6	−5.8
Liberal Democrats	Frank Cooper	1040	23.9	−3.4
Majority		1,168	26.9	+15.1
Turnout		4,346		
Labour hold		Swing		

=== Smallbridge and Firgrove ward ===
Smallbridge and Firgrove ward
Party	Candidate	Votes	%	±%
Labour	Bernard Martin Burke	1,702	42.4	+5.9
Liberal Democrats	Christine Akram	1381	34.4	−11.3
Conservative	Len Branton	934	23.3	+5.4
Majority		321	8.0	
Turnout		4,017		
Labour gain from Liberal Democrats		Swing		

=== South Middleton ward ===
South Middleton ward
Party	Candidate	Votes	%	±%
Conservative	Michael Charles Holly	2,103	41.4	−17.0
Labour	Michael Gary Burke	1977	39.0	+5.2
Liberal Democrats	Jane Al-Attar	995	19.6	+11.8
Majority		126	2.5	−22.0
Turnout		5,075		
Conservative hold		Swing		

=== Spotland and Falinge ward ===
Spotland and Falinge ward
Party	Candidate	Votes	%	±%
Labour	Surinder Biant	1,883	40.5	+0.9
Liberal Democrats	Peter Clegg	1483	31.9	−13.0
Conservative	Steven Scholes	718	15.5	+0.0
Independent	Carl Faulkner	561	12.1	+12.1
Majority		400	8.6	
Turnout		4,645		
Labour gain from Liberal Democrats		Swing		

=== Wardle and West Littleborough ward ===
Wardle and West Littleborough ward
Party	Candidate	Votes	%	±%
Conservative	Robert Clegg	2,545	54.3	−26.1
Liberal Democrats	Reginald James Lane	1074	22.9	+13.0
Labour	David Finlay	1067	22.8	+13.0
Majority		1,471	31.4	−39.1
Turnout		4,686		
Conservative hold		Swing		

=== West Heywood ward ===
West Heywood ward
Party	Candidate	Votes	%	±%
Labour	Alan Michael McCarthy	2,203	50.3	−3.0
Liberal Democrats	Simon Paul Steward	1109	25.3	+5.2
Conservative	Darren Philip Bayman	1069	24.4	−1.1
Majority		1,094	25.0	−1.8
Turnout		4,381		
Labour hold		Swing		

=== West Middleton ward ===
West Middleton ward
Party	Candidate	Votes	%	±%
Labour	Neil Patrick Emmott	2,232	54.7	+2.1
Liberal Democrats	Neil Proctor	712	17.4	−7.6
Conservative	Robert Alexander Herd	630	15.4	−7.0
BNP	Peter Greenwood	508	12.4	+12.4
Majority		1,520	37.2	+9.6
Turnout		4,082		
Labour hold		Swing		
