= 2010 Bolton Metropolitan Borough Council election =

2010 UK local government election

Results of the 2010 Bolton Metropolitan Borough Council election

Elections to Bolton Metropolitan Borough Council were held on 6 May 2010, on the same day as the General Election which led to a much higher turnout than in recent years. One third of the council was up for election and the council stayed under no overall control.

20 seats were contested with 13 being won by the Labour Party, 6 by the Conservatives and 1 by the Liberal Democrats.

In the Smithills ward, the Lib Dems held the seat but defeated the sitting Councillor, R Silvester, who had previously moved from the Lib Dems to the Labour Party.

After the election, the total composition of the council was:

- Labour 30
- Conservative 22
- Liberal Democrats 8

== Election result ==
Bolton local election result 2010
Party	Seats	Gains	Losses	Net gain/loss	Seats %	Votes %	Votes	+/−
Labour	13	3	0	+3		39.5	48,880	+7.1
Conservative	6	0	1	-1		33.9	41,919	-8.0
Liberal Democrats	1	0	2	-2		21.4	26,474	+1.0
Green	0	0	0	0	0	2.2	2,728	-0.3
BNP	0	0	0	0	0	1.5	1,865	+0.3
Independent	0	0	0	0	0	1.7	2,139	+1.6

== Council composition ==
Prior to the election the composition of the council was:

↓
28	23	9
Labour	Conservative	Lib Dems

After the election the composition of the council was:

↓
30	22	8
Labour	Conservative	Lib Dems

== Ward results ==
=== Astley Bridge ward ===
Astley Bridge ward
Party	Candidate	Votes	%	±%
Conservative	John Walsh	3,204	46.5	−17.9
Labour	Asif Ibrahim	2,034	29.5	+13.9
Liberal Democrats	Clive Richard Atty	1,257	18.4	−1.8
Independent	Neville Mercer	396	5.7	+5.7
Majority		1,170	16.8	−27.6
Turnout		6,947	69.1	+33.1
Conservative hold		Swing	Con to Labour 15.9	

=== Bradshaw ward ===
Bradshaw ward
Party	Candidate	Votes	%	±%
Conservative	Paul Brierley	3,464	53.7	−15.0
Labour	Kate Challender	1,733	26.9	+10.1
Liberal Democrats	Stephen Frederick Howarth	1,090	16.9	+7.6
Green	Anne Mumberson	163	2.5	−2.8
Majority		1,731	26.7	−25.2
Turnout		6,478	72.1	+31.4
Conservative hold		Swing	Con to Labour 12.5	

=== Breightmet ward ===
Breightmet ward
Party	Candidate	Votes	%	±%
Labour	Lynda Jean Byrne	2,787	49.6	+16.8
Conservative	Sandra MacNeill	1,951	34.7	−12.4
Liberal Democrats	David Charles Tyas Cooper	876	15.6	+11.1
Majority		836	14.8	
Turnout		5,655	59.2	+18.6
Labour hold		Swing	Con to Labour 14.6	

=== Bromley Cross ward ===
Bromley Cross ward
Party	Candidate	Votes	%	±%
Conservative	David Wells Greenhalgh	4,236	54.5	−14.4
Labour	Anthony Muscat Terribile	1,774	22.8	+6.2
Liberal Democrats	Stewart Malcolm Ball	1,456	18.7	+10.9
Green	Lynne Hyland	303	3.9	+0.4
Majority		2,462	31.5	−20.8
Turnout		7,821	74.1	+33.3
Conservative hold		Swing	Con to LD 12.6	

=== Crompton ward ===
Crompton ward
Party	Candidate	Votes	%	±%
Labour	Sufrana Bashir-Ismail	3,749	62.4	+12.4
Conservative	Amina Khilji	1,325	22.0	−6.0
Liberal Democrats	Jaleh Salari	938	15.6	−6.4
Majority		2,424	40.3	+18.4
Turnout		6,012	61.7	+22.9
Labour hold		Swing	LD to Labour 9.4	

=== Farnworth ward ===
Farnworth ward
Party	Candidate	Votes	%	±%
Labour	Noel Spencer	2,612	53.2	+11.7
Conservative	Ruth Kenny	1,040	21.2	+2.1
Liberal Democrats	David Arthur Connor	994	20.3	−14.1
Green	Diana Hayes	260	5.3	+0.3
Majority		1,572	32.0	+24.9
Turnout		4,906	45.9	+20.5
Labour hold		Swing	LD to Labour 12.9	

=== Great Lever ward ===
Great Lever ward
Party	Candidate	Votes	%	±%
Labour	Mohammed Ayub	2,844	49.9	+3.3
Conservative	Mohammad Idrees	1,805	31.6	−4.7
Liberal Democrats	Matthew David Tyas Cooper	785	13.8	+6.9
Green	Alan Johnson	270	4.7	−5.8
Majority		1,039	18.2	+8.2
Turnout		5,704	58.3	+21.8
Labour hold		Swing	Green to LD 6.3	

=== Halliwell ward ===
Halliwell ward
Party	Candidate	Votes	%	±%
Labour	Akhtar Zaman	3,228	65.1	+2.6
Liberal Democrats	Francine Godfrey	882	17.8	+1.3
Conservative	Gareth Morris	845	17.1	−4.0
Majority		2,346	47.3	+5.9
Turnout		4,955	55.1	+23.5
Labour hold		Swing	Con to Labour 3.3	

=== Harper Green ward ===
Harper Green ward
Party	Candidate	Votes	%	±%
Labour	Mike Francis	2,312	44.8	+0.1
Liberal Democrats	Wendy Connor	1,203	23.3	+8.5
Conservative	Bill Dawson	903	17.5	−23.0
Independent	Laurence John Williamson	625	12.1	+12.1
Green	Eric Thomas Hyland	114	2.2	+2.2
Majority		1,109	21.5	+17.3
Turnout		5,157	54.0	+27.3
Labour hold		Swing	Con to Ind 17.5	

=== Heaton and Lostock ward ===
Heaton and Lostock ward
Party	Candidate	Votes	%	±%
Conservative	Colin Shaw	4,643	57.6	−13.0
Labour	John William Gillatt	1,973	24.5	+7.1
Liberal Democrats	Christine Joyce Macpherson	1,265	15.7	+8.9
Green	Daniel James Mann	184	2.3	−2.9
Majority		2,670	33.1	−20.1
Turnout		8,065	75.6	+30.3
Conservative hold		Swing	Con to LD 10.9	

=== Horwich and Blackrod ward ===
Horwich and Blackrod ward
Party	Candidate	Votes	%	±%
Labour	Stephen Pickup	2,423	38.1	+7.7
Conservative	Michael Hollick	2,229	35.1	−8.6
Liberal Democrats	Kenneth Thomson	1,319	20.7	−5.2
Green	Graham Chadwick	388	6.1	+6.1
Majority		194	3.0	
Turnout		6,359	65.9	+30.9
Labour gain from Conservative		Swing	Con to Labour 8.1	

=== Horwich North East ward ===
Horwich North East ward
Party	Candidate	Votes	%	±%
Labour	Kevin P. McKeon	2,243	33.0	+10.3
Liberal Democrats	Stephen Michael Rock	2,153	31.7	−12.3
Conservative	Carol Ann Forshaw	1,970	29.0	−1.7
BNP	Ivan Andrew Cooper	421	6.2	+6.2
Majority		90	1.3	
Turnout		6,787	69.4	+32.2
Labour gain from Liberal Democrats		Swing	LD to Labour 11.3	

=== Hulton ward ===
Hulton ward
Party	Candidate	Votes	%	±%
Conservative	Andrew Philip Morgan	2,873	57.5	−6.7
Labour	Shafaqat Shaikh	1,928	31.9	−1.4
Liberal Democrats	Paul Anthony Harasiwka	888	14.7	+2.2
Green	James David Tomkinson	364	6.0	+6.0
Majority		945	15.6	−5.3
Turnout		6,053	61.8	−27.8
Conservative hold		Swing	Con to Green 6.3	

=== Kearsley ward ===
Kearsley ward
Party	Candidate	Votes	%	±%
Labour	Derek Burrows	2,706	46.4	+12.2
Liberal Democrats	Tracey Kane	1,797	30.8	−15.8
Conservative	Diane Bamber	1,331	22.8	+3.5
Majority		909	15.6	
Turnout		5,834	56.5	+26.7
Labour hold		Swing	LD to Labour 14.0	

=== Little Lever and Darcy Lever ward ===
Little Lever and Darcy Lever ward
Party	Candidate	Votes	%	±%
Labour	Maureen Connell	2,036	31.6	−5.5
Conservative	Rees Gibbon	1,794	27.8	−17.7
Liberal Democrats	Eric John Hyde	1,342	20.8	+9.8
Independent	Sean Colin Hornby	1,118	17.3	+17.3
Green	Alwynne Cartmell	161	2.5	−3.9
Majority		242	3.7	
Turnout		6,451	66.0	+27.3
Labour hold		Swing	Con to Ind 17.5	

=== Rumworth ward ===
Rumworth ward
Party	Candidate	Votes	%	±%
Labour	Ismail Ibrahim	3,928	70.0	+6.8
Liberal Democrats	Glen Carl Atkinson	855	14.7	+14.7
Conservative	Michelle Laura Ionn	825	15.2	−6.6
Majority		3,073	54.8	+13.4
Turnout		5,608	56.0	+26.7
Labour hold		Swing	Con to LD 10.6	

=== Smithills ward ===
Smithills ward
Party	Candidate	Votes	%	±%
Liberal Democrats	Anthony James Radlett	2,741	41.0	−6.6
Labour Co-op	Richard Edward Warner Silvester	1,699	25.4	+9.8
Conservative	Christine Deidre Flannagan	1,632	24.4	−7.4
BNP	Anthony Backhouse	461	6.9	+6.9
Green	Rachel Elizabeth Mann	153	2.3	−1.3
Majority		1,042	15.6	+0.8
Turnout		6,686	67.3	+29.4
Liberal Democrats gain from Labour		Swing	Con to Labour 8.6	

=== Tonge with the Haulgh ward ===
Tonge with the Haulgh ward
Party	Candidate	Votes	%	±%
Labour	Nick Peel	2,495	48.0	+7.7
Conservative	Kath Kavanagh	1,418	27.3	−7.4
Liberal Democrats	Michael George Langdon	756	14.6	+8.5
BNP	Dorothee Sayers	525	10.1	−5.7
Majority		1,077	20.7	+15.1
Turnout		5,194	57.7	+23.2
Labour hold		Swing	Con to LD 7.9	

=== Westhoughton North and Chew Moor ward ===
Westhoughton North and Chew Moor ward
Party	Candidate	Votes	%	±%
Conservative	Martyn Cox	2,826	38.2	−9.4
Labour Co-op	Karen Louise Lawrinson	2,263	30.6	+6.1
Liberal Democrats	Derek John Gradwell	2,087	28.2	+4.2
Green	Ian David McHugh	222	3.0	−0.9
Majority		563	7.6	−15.5
Turnout		7,398	67.6	+34.4
Conservative hold		Swing	Con to Labour 7.7	

=== Westhoughton South ward ===
Westhoughton South ward
Party	Candidate	Votes	%	±%
Labour	Kevan Stanley Jones	2,113	34.6	+7.5
Liberal Democrats	Julia Mary Silvester	1,790	29.3	−8.1
Conservative	Paul Vernon Wild	1,605	26.3	−5.1
BNP	Richard Adam Bates	458	7.5	+7.5
Green	Kirsty Rachael Upham	146	2.4	−1.7
Majority		323	5.3	
Turnout		6,112	63.5	+31.2
Labour gain from Liberal Democrats		Swing	LD to Labour 7.8	
