= 2010 Broxbourne Borough Council election =

2010 UK local government election

Results of the 2010 Broxbourne Borough Council election

The Broxbourne Council election, 2010 was held on 6 May 2010 to elect council members of the Broxbourne Borough Council, a local government authority in Hertfordshire, England.

== Composition of expiring seats before election ==
Ward	Party	Incumbent Elected	Incumbent	Standing again?
Broxbourne	Conservative	2006	Joyce Ball	No
Bury Green	Conservative	2006	Martin Greensmyth	Yes
Cheshunt Central	Conservative	2006	Keith Brown	Yes (Note: Keith Brown stood in Hoddesdon North Ward in 2010.)
Cheshunt North	Conservative	2006	Kay Leese	No
Flamstead End	Conservative	2006	Paul Seeby	Yes
Goffs Oak	Conservative	2006	Mark Mills-Bishop	Yes
Hoddesdon North	Conservative	2006	Alan Smith	No
Hoddesdon Town	Conservative	2006	Kenneth Ayling	Yes
Rosedale	Conservative	2006	David Lewis	Yes
Rye Park	Conservative	2006	Moyra O'Neill	No
Theobalds	Conservative	2006	Carol Crump-Eynon	Yes
Waltham Cross	Labour	2006	Malcolm Aitken	Yes
Wormley & Turnford	Conservative	2006	Gordon Nicholson	Yes

== Election results ==
Broxbourne local election result 2010
Party	Seats	Gains	Losses	Net gain/loss	Seats %	Votes %	Votes	+/−
Conservative	12	0	0	0	92.31	59.69	25,615	-3.77
Labour	1	0	0	0	7.69	21.09	9,051	+1.89
Liberal Democrats	0	0	0	0	0.00	11.26	4,830	+9.27
BNP	0	0	0	0	0.00	7.96	3,417	-7.38

== Results summary ==
An election was held in all 13 wards on Thursday 6 May 2010.

The May 2010 election saw the largest number of Liberal Democrat candidates in a Broxbourne election since the whole council was elected in 1999 following the Boundary Commission review.

The Liberal Democrats succeeded in achieving 3rd place in the popular vote despite fielding the smallest number of candidates (9) of any party.

The overall BNP result was the worst achieving by the party in recent years. All of the BNP candidates finished in last place in the 10 wards the BNP contested.

Additionally the BNP share of the vote fell by over 7% when compared with the last Broxbourne Council elections held in 2008.

No seats changed hands in this election.

The new political balance of the council following this election was:

- Conservative 35 seats
- Labour 3 seats

The next Local Government Election was scheduled to be held on 5 May 2011 when seats will be contested in all of the 13 wards.

In December 2010 Councillor Joanne Welch left the Conservative Group and sat as an Independent member. As a result of this the new political balance of the council was:

- Conservative 34 seats
- Labour 3 seats
- Independent 1 seat

== Ward results ==
Broxbourne Ward Result 6 May 2010
Party	Candidate	Votes	%	±%
Conservative	Sheila Ann Benford	2,359	65.60	−5.43
Liberal Democrats	Peter Raymond Huse	826	22.97	+10.80
Labour	Raymond Harold Cook	411	11.43	+1.86
Majority		1,533		
Turnout		3,596	71.59	
Conservative hold		Swing		

Bury Green Ward Result 6 May 2010
Party	Candidate	Votes	%	±%
Conservative	Martin Greensmyth	1,566	53.91	−5.76
Labour	Ian Graham Hunter	534	18.38	0.56
Liberal Democrats	Michael Robert Hanks	432	14.87	+14.87
BNP	Wendy Jane Ward	373	12.84	−10.17
Majority		1,032		
Turnout		2,905	61.45	
Conservative hold		Swing		

Cheshunt Central Ward Result 6 May 2010
Party	Candidate	Votes	%	±%
Conservative	Jason Brimson	2,251	64.83	−2.02
Labour	Christopher John Simonovitch	813	23.42	+6.65
BNP	Ramon Paul Johns	408	11.75	−4.63
Majority		1,438		
Turnout		3,472	61.68	
Conservative hold		Swing		

Cheshunt North Ward Result 6 May 2010
Party	Candidate	Votes	%	±%
Conservative	Gary Kenneth Clark	1,852	56.17	−8.42
Labour	Peter George Charles Alford	676	20.50	+1.76
Liberal Democrats	Amanda Jane Newman	427	12.96	+12.96
BNP	Carolyn Iles	342	10.37	−6.30
Majority		1,176		
Turnout		3,297	59.75	
Conservative hold		Swing		

Flamstead End Ward Result 6 May 2010
Party	Candidate	Votes	%	±%
Conservative	Paul Nicholas Seeby	2,056	60.36	−7.73
Labour	Shirley McInnes	524	18.38	+3.97
Liberal Democrats	Michael Cripps	471	13.83	+13.83
BNP	Ian John Seeby	355	10.42	−7.08
Majority		1,532		
Turnout		3,406	64.67	
Conservative hold		Swing		

Goffs Oak Ward Result 6 May 2010
Party	Candidate	Votes	%	±%
Conservative	Mark Bevis James Mills-Bishop	3,194	76.72	−0.51
Labour	Cherry Lorraine Robbins	649	15.59	+4.30
BNP	Russell Jesse Shevill	320	7.69	−3.79
Majority		2,545		
Turnout		4,163	67.14	
Conservative hold		Swing		

Hoddesdon North Ward Result 6 May 2010
Party	Candidate	Votes	%	±%
Conservative	Keith Martin Brown	2,317	62.67	−10.33
Liberal Democrats	Fraser Scott	556	15.04	+15.04
Labour	Edward Herbert Hopwood	548	14.82	+0.07
BNP	Terence Frederick Savage	276	7.47	−4.78
Majority		1,761		
Turnout		3,697	66.75	
Conservative hold		Swing		

Hoddesdon Town Ward Result 6 May 2010
Party	Candidate	Votes	%	±%
Conservative	Kenneth Alan Ayling	1,832	56.60	−3.08
Liberal Democrats	Kirstie Jane Mounsteven De Rivaz	742	22.92	+9.57
Labour	Neil Harvey	663	20.48	+5.68
Majority		1,090		
Turnout		3,237	58.79	
Conservative hold		Swing		

Rosedale Ward Result 6 May 2010
Party	Candidate	Votes	%	±%
Conservative	David Arthur Lewis	1,167	57.15	−3.68
Labour	Alexander David McInnes	456	22.33	+11.21
BNP	Stephen McCole	419	20.52	−7.23
Majority		711		
Turnout		2,042	61.02	
Conservative hold		Swing		

Rye Park Ward Result 6 May 2010
Party	Candidate	Votes	%	±%
Conservative	Keith Victor Bellamy	1,559	50.50	−6.20
Labour	Annette Judith Marples	783	25.36	−5.68
Liberal Democrats	Michael John Winrow	482	15.61	+15.61
BNP	William James Dewick	263	8.52	−3.64
Majority		776		
Turnout		3,087	59.32	
Conservative hold		Swing		

Theobalds Ward Result 6 May 2010
Party	Candidate	Votes	%	±%
Conservative	Carol Ann Crump-Eynon	2,197	66.02	+0.89
Labour	Ronald Douglas McCole	1,131	33.98	+11.80
Majority		1,066		
Turnout		3,328	61.12	
Conservative hold		Swing		

Waltham Cross Ward Result 6 May 2010
Party	Candidate	Votes	%	±%
Labour	Malcolm David Aitken	1,137	41.53	−0.26
Conservative	Jill Thatcher	1,027	37.51	+6.27
Liberal Democrats	Nigel Francis De Rivaz	326	11.91	+11.91
BNP	Christopher David Francis	248	9.06	−17.90
Majority		110		
Turnout		2,738	53.52	
Labour hold		Swing		

Wormley & Turnford Ward Result 6 May 2010
Party	Candidate	Votes	%	±%
Conservative	Gordon Nicholson	2,238	56.73	−6.56
Labour	Tom Michael Stone	726	18.40	−1.11
Liberal Democrats	Doreen Angela Bossis	568	14.40	+14.40
BNP	Mark Anthony Gerrard	413	10.47	−6.73
Majority		1,512		
Turnout		3,945	58.31	
Conservative hold		Swing		
