= 2010 Stroud District Council election =

Council election in Gloucestershire, England

Results of the 2010 Stroud District Council election

The 2010 Stroud Council election took place on 6 May 2010 to elect members of Stroud District Council in Gloucestershire, England. One third of the council was up for election and the Conservative Party stayed in overall control of the council.

After the election, the composition of the council was

- Conservative 30
- Liberal Democrat 7
- Labour 7
- Green 6
- Independent 1

== Election result ==
The results saw the Conservatives retain control of the council with 30 councillors despite losing 2 seats to the Liberal Democrats. The Liberal Democrats gained Dursley and Wotton-under-Edge wards from the Conservatives, to move to 7 seats, level with Labour.

Stroud local election result 2010
Party	Seats	Gains	Losses	Net gain/loss	Seats %	Votes %	Votes	+/−
Conservative	12	1	2	-1	66.7	44.1	21,102	-7.1%
Liberal Democrats	3	2	0	+2	16.7	15.6	7,487	+3.4%
Labour	2	0	0	0	11.1	27.2	13,019	+9.8%
Green	1	0	0	0	5.6	13.0	6,242	-4.8%
Independent	0	0	1	-1	0	0	0	-

== Ward results ==
Berkeley (2)
Party	Candidate	Votes	%	±%
Conservative	Gordon Craig	1,281		
Conservative	John Stanton	1,253		
Labour	Jaswant Gangotra	800		
Labour	John Greenwood	790		
Turnout		4,124	71.0	+32.0
Conservative hold		Swing		
Conservative hold		Swing		

Bisley
Party	Candidate	Votes	%	±%
Conservative	Daniel Le Flemming	721	48.1	−15.3
Green	Anna Bonallack	585	39.1	+15.4
Labour	Theresa Watt	192	12.8	+8.2
Majority		136	9.1	−30.6
Turnout		1,498	83.3	+31.4
Conservative hold		Swing		

Cainscross
Party	Candidate	Votes	%	±%
Labour	Karon Cross	1,725	44.6	+2.4
Conservative	Ian Robinson	1,123	29.0	−7.2
Liberal Democrats	Sylvia Bridgland	678	17.5	+6.8
Green	Helen Cranston	341	8.8	−2.1
Majority		602	15.6	+9.5
Turnout		3,867	70.1	+36.8
Labour hold		Swing		

Cam East
Party	Candidate	Votes	%	±%
Conservative	John Hudson	942	38.3	−9.6
Labour	Miranda Clifton	858	34.9	−3.2
Liberal Democrats	Darren Jones	586	23.8	+9.8
Green	Indigo Redfern	73	3.0	+3.0
Majority		84	3.4	−6.4
Turnout		2,459	75.6	+29.5
Conservative hold		Swing		

Cam West
Party	Candidate	Votes	%	±%
Liberal Democrats	Dennis Andrewartha	1,068	45.8	+13.0
Conservative	Jeffrey Tyndall	662	28.4	+0.4
Labour	Josephine Colebrook	604	25.9	−13.4
Majority		406	17.4	
Turnout		2,334	72.3	+34.3
Liberal Democrats hold		Swing		

Chalford
Party	Candidate	Votes	%	±%
Conservative	Chas Fellows	2,033	51.5	−4.7
Green	Richard Dean	1,041	26.4	−2.8
Labour	Sally Thorpe	872	22.1	+13.1
Majority		992	25.1	−1.9
Turnout		3,946	78.4	+35.2
Conservative hold		Swing		

Coaley and Uley
Party	Candidate	Votes	%	±%
Conservative	Graham Trave	844	55.9	+20.9
Labour	Tricia Leonard	665	44.1	+35.1
Majority		179	11.9	
Turnout		1,509	81.6	+30.0
Conservative gain from Independent		Swing		

Dursley
Party	Candidate	Votes	%	±%
Liberal Democrats	Brian Marsh	1,136	33.0	+0.7
Conservative	Timothy Frankau	1,120	32.5	−1.9
Labour	Geoffrey Wheeler	1,026	29.8	+1.6
Green	Miriam Yagud	163	4.7	−0.5
Majority		16	0.5	
Turnout		3,445	68.1	+29.1
Liberal Democrats gain from Conservative		Swing		

Hardwicke
Party	Candidate	Votes	%	±%
Conservative	Graham Littleton	1,606	63.1	−6.2
Labour	Barbara Peacock	940	36.9	+18.9
Majority		666	26.2	−25.1
Turnout		2,546	67.8	+34.0
Conservative hold		Swing		

Nailsworth
Party	Candidate	Votes	%	±%
Conservative	Rowland Blackwell	1,588	41.1	−0.8
Green	Catherine Farrell	1,364	35.3	−7.8
Labour	Jo Smith	908	23.5	+13.9
Majority		224	5.8	
Turnout		3,860	72.9	+26.5
Conservative hold		Swing		

Painswick
Party	Candidate	Votes	%	±%
Conservative	Frances Roden	1,716	58.9	−10.1
Green	Peter Adams	717	24.6	+3.8
Labour	Joan Moore	481	16.5	+6.3
Majority		999	34.3	−13.8
Turnout		2,914	80.5	+30.5
Conservative hold		Swing		

Randwick, Whiteshill and Ruscombe
Party	Candidate	Votes	%	±%
Green	Philip Booth	765	68.8	+13.0
Conservative	Jason Bullingham	215	19.3	−9.3
Labour	John Appleton	132	11.9	+2.4
Majority		550	49.5	+22.3
Turnout		1,112	77.4	+25.8
Green hold		Swing		

Severn
Party	Candidate	Votes	%	±%
Conservative	John Jones	1,511	53.1	−7.5
Liberal Democrats	John Howe	825	29.0	+9.7
Labour	Lesley Williams	507	17.8	+4.8
Majority		686	24.1	−17.2
Turnout		2,843	76.4	+33.5
Conservative hold		Swing		

Stonehouse
Party	Candidate	Votes	%	±%
Labour	Gary Powell	1,684	41.9	+1.7
Conservative	Trevor Baker	1,433	35.7	−6.4
Liberal Democrats	Andrew Fisk	583	14.5	+14.5
Green	Clare Sheridan	315	7.8	−4.0
Majority		251	6.3	
Turnout		4,015	67.4	+33.3
Labour hold		Swing		

The Stanleys
Party	Candidate	Votes	%	±%
Conservative	Nigel Studdert-Kennedy	941	37.6	−14.7
Labour	Stephen Lydon	593	23.7	+0.7
Liberal Democrats	Phillip Herbert	558	22.3	+11.4
Green	Nicola Hillard	412	16.5	+2.7
Majority		348	13.9	−15.4
Turnout		2,504	76.5	+35.3
Conservative hold		Swing		

Vale
Party	Candidate	Votes	%	±%
Conservative	Penny Wride	892	78.7	+2.7
Labour	Hilary Fowles	242	21.3	+11.7
Majority		650	57.3	−4.2
Turnout		1,134	76.0	+26.9
Conservative hold		Swing		

Wotton-Under-Edge
Party	Candidate	Votes	%	±%
Liberal Democrats	Alan O'Connor	2,053	54.9	+9.9
Conservative	Nick McGarvey	1,221	32.6	−10.9
Green	David Barker	466	12.5	+1.0
Majority		832	22.2	+20.6
Turnout		3,740	73.6	+28.6
Liberal Democrats gain from Conservative		Swing		
