= Feltham North =

Electoral ward in London, England

- Electoral ward for the Hounslow London Borough Council
- Feltham North ward boundaries since 2022
- Borough: Hounslow
- County: Greater London
- Population: 12,906 (2021) (Note: 2021 Census data reported for 2022 ward boundaries)
- Electorate: 8,956 (2026)
- Major settlements: Feltham
- Area: 2.684 square kilometres (1.036 sq mi)

Current electoral ward
- Created: 1965
- Number of members: 3
- Councillors: Muhammad Akram; David Kerr; Adam Parkins
- GSS code: E05000351 (2002–2022); E05013613 (2022–present)

Feltham North is an electoral ward in the London Borough of Hounslow. The ward was first used in the 1964 elections and elects three councillors to Hounslow London Borough Council.

== List of councillors ==
The ward has returned the following councillors:

Seat	Councillor	Took office	Left office	Party	Election
1	Mike Slattery	1964	1968	Labour	1964
2	Walter Miles	1964	1978	Labour	1964 ... 1974
3	Michael Fitzgerald	1964	1967	Labour	1964
3	Fred Powe (Note: Fred Powe was a councillor for Cranford from 1971 to 1982. He was Mayor of Hounslow for the 1971/2 municipal year.)	1967	1968	Labour	1967
1	William Gamble	1968	1971	Labour	1968
3	John Barr	1968	1971	Labour	1968
1	Jack Brown	1971	1974	Labour	1971
3	John Tilley	1971	1978	Labour	1971, 1974
1	Wendy Bates	1974	1978	Labour	1974
1	Allan Wilson	1978	1982	Conservative	1978
2	Neville Aris	1978	1982	Conservative	1978
3	Richard Kean	1978	1982	Conservative	1978
1	William Nimmo	1982	1986	Labour	1982
2	David Connor	1982	1990	Labour	1982, 1986
3	Leslie Bawn	1982	1986	Labour	1982
1	Michael Hunt	1986	2006	Labour	1986 ... 2002
3	John Chatt	1986	2006	Labour	1986 ... 2002
2	Stuart Walmsley	1990	2002	Labour	1990, 1994, 1998
2	Robert Bowen	2002	2014	Conservative	2002, 2006, 2010
1	Gillian Hutchison (Note: Gillian Hutchison changed parties in 2013.)	2006	2014	Conservative	2006, 2010
1	Gillian Hutchison	2006	2014	UKIP	2006, 2010
3	Allan Wilson	2006	2014	Conservative	2006, 2010
1	John Chatt	2014	2019	Labour	2014, 2018
2	Hina Mir	2014	2018	Labour	2014
3	Khulique Malik	2014	2018	Labour	2014
2	Aqsa Ahmed	2018	2022	Labour	2018
3	Komal Chaudri	2018	2022	Labour	2018
1	Kuldeep Tak (Note: Kuldeep Tak changed parties in 2024.)	2019	2026	Conservative	2019, 2022
1	Kuldeep Tak	2019	2026	Labour	2019, 2022
2	Samina Nagra	2022	2026	Labour	2022
3	Muhammad Akram	2022	Incumbent	Labour	2022, 2026
1	David Kerr	2026	Incumbent	Reform	2026
2	Adam Parkins	2026	Incumbent	Reform	2026

== Summary ==
Councillors elected by party at each general borough election.

- Labour
- Conservative
- Reform

== Hounslow council elections since 2022 ==
There was a revision of ward boundaries in Hounslow in 2022.

=== 2026 election ===
The election took place on 7 May 2026.

2026 Hounslow London Borough Council election: Feltham North
Party	Candidate	Votes	%	±%
Labour	Muhammad Akram	1,171	30.6	−15.6
Reform	David Kerr	1,122	29.4	New
Reform	Adam Parkins	1,094	28.6	New
Labour	Emma Yates	1,090	28.5	−16.1
Labour	Kuldeep Tak	1,016	26.6	−15.9
Reform	Khushwant Singh	993	26.0	New
Conservative	Indra Lingden	901	23.6	−22.2
Conservative	Chaitanya Sinha	800	20.9	−23.0
Conservative	Wafa Khider	783	20.5	−21.5
Green	Sergejs Adamovs	646	16.9	+1.4
Independent	Dan Barnett	437	11.4	New
Liberal Democrats	Arlene Juriansz	331	8.7	New
Independent	Krissh Thangavelu	172	4.5	New
Turnout		3,822	42.7	+9.1
Labour hold		Swing		
Reform gain from Labour		Swing	23.1	
Reform gain from Conservative		Swing	21.3	

=== 2022 election ===
The election took place on 5 May 2022.

2022 Hounslow London Borough Council election: Feltham North
Party	Candidate	Votes	%	±%
Labour	Samina Nagra	1,288	46.2	
Conservative	Kuldeep Tak	1,276	45.8	
Labour	Muhammad Akram	1,244	44.6	
Conservative	Nimmi Madadi	1,225	43.9	
Labour	Tariq Mehmood	1,186	42.5	
Conservative	Zubair Awan	1,172	42.0	
Green	Chantel Wetzel	431	15.5	
Turnout		2,789		
Labour win (new boundaries)				
Conservative win (new boundaries)				
Labour win (new boundaries)				

== 2002–2022 Hounslow council elections ==
Feltham North ward boundaries from 2002 to 2022

There was a revision of ward boundaries in Hounslow in 2002.

=== 2019 by-election ===
The by-election took place on 12 December 2019, following the death John Chatt.

2019 Feltham North by-election
Party	Candidate	Votes	%	±%
Conservative	Kuldeep Tak	2,025	43.5	+16.8
Labour	Adesh Farmahan	1,975	42.5	−1.5
Liberal Democrats	Joseph Bourke	351	7.5	−1.0
Green	Ioana-Simona Voicila	209	4.5	−3.5
Independent	Nooralhaq Nasimi	91	2.0	+2.0
Majority		50	1.1	
Turnout		4,651		
Conservative gain from Labour		Swing		

=== 2018 election ===
The election took place on 3 May 2018.

2018 Hounslow London Borough Council election: Feltham North
Party	Candidate	Votes	%	±%
Labour	John Chatt	1,463	48.8	+7.2
Labour	Aqsa Ahmed	1,399	46.6	+6.5
Labour	Komal Chaudri	1,321	44.0	+7.7
Conservative	Martin Gallagher	888	29.6	+4.4
Conservative	Anand Rai	838	27.9	+4.6
Conservative	Zilfiqar Ali	765	25.5	+2.6
Independent	Ian Stewart	425	14.2	N/A
Independent	June Stewart	380	12.7	N/A
Liberal Democrats	Jack Moran	283	9.4	±0.0
Green	Leah Hammocks	266	8.9	−2.2
Green	Anthony Agius	180	6.0	N/A
Liberal Democrats	Naomi Stoney	150	5.0	N/A
Green	Elly Lewis-Holmes	128	4.3	N/A
Turnout				
Labour hold		Swing		
Labour hold		Swing		
Labour hold		Swing		

=== 2014 election ===
The election took place on 22 May 2014.

2014 Hounslow London Borough Council election: Feltham North
Party	Candidate	Votes	%	±%
Labour	John Chatt	1,332	41.6	+7.0
Labour	Hina Mir	1,283	40.1	+7.9
Labour	Khulique Malik	1,163	36.3	+4.8
UKIP	Gillian Hutchison	1,061	33.1	−3.3
Conservative	Jarek Kalinowski	808	25.2	−27.8
Conservative	Gurbachan Athwal	746	23.3	−13.7
Conservative	Abdul Majid	734	22.9	−13.5
Green	Greg Ivison	356	11.1	N/A
Liberal Democrats	Carl Pierce	301	9.4	−8.0
Turnout		3,202	37.3	
Labour gain from Conservative		Swing		
Labour gain from Conservative		Swing		
Labour gain from Conservative		Swing		

=== 2010 election ===
The election on 6 May 2010 took place on the same day as the United Kingdom general election.

2010 Hounslow London Borough Council election: Feltham North
Party	Candidate	Votes	%	±%
Conservative	Robert Bowen	2,493	53.0	
Conservative	Allan Wilson	1,740	37.0	
Conservative	Gillian Hutchison	1,713	36.4	
Labour	Syd Yates	1,627	34.6	
Labour	Sukhbir Dhaliwal	1,515	32.2	
Labour	Dharmpal Dudee	1,483	31.5	
Liberal Democrats	Doug Edwards	819	17.4	
BNP	Jean Tomkins	534	11.3	
Turnout		4,705	57.6	
Conservative hold		Swing		
Conservative hold		Swing		
Conservative hold		Swing		

=== 2006 election ===
The election took place on 4 May 2006.

2006 Hounslow London Borough Council election: Feltham North
Party	Candidate	Votes	%	±%
Conservative	Robert Bowen	1,917	56.7	
Conservative	Gillian Hutchison	1,491		
Conservative	Allan Wilson	1,477		
Labour	Michael Hunt	750	22.2	
Labour	Michael Carman	709		
Labour	Harbinder Sarai	645		
National Front	Pamela Chambers	411	12.2	
Liberal Democrats	Douglas Edwards	301	8.9	
Turnout			39.9	
Conservative hold		Swing		
Conservative gain from Labour		Swing		
Conservative gain from Labour		Swing		

=== 2002 election ===
The election took place on 2 May 2002.

2002 Hounslow London Borough Council election: Feltham North
Party	Candidate	Votes	%	±%
Conservative	Robert Bowen	1,109		
Labour	Michael Hunt	779		
Labour	John Chatt	758		
Labour	Stuart Walmsley	730		
Liberal Democrats	Anthony Hutchins	500		
Liberal Democrats	Rachel Morley	419		
Liberal Democrats	Philip Vial	248		
Turnout				
Conservative win (new boundaries)				
Labour win (new boundaries)				
Labour win (new boundaries)				

== 1978–2002 Hounslow council elections ==
Feltham North ward boundaries from 1978 to 2002

There was a revision of ward boundaries in Hounslow in 1978.

=== 1998 election ===
The election on 7 May 1998 took place on the same day as the 1998 Greater London Authority referendum.

1998 Hounslow London Borough Council election: Feltham North
Party	Candidate	Votes	%	±%
Labour	Michael Hunt	1,063	46.44	▼14.54
Labour	Stuart Walmsley	1,060		
Labour	John Chatt	1,036		
Conservative	Allan Wilson	544	18.70	▼5.59
Ind. Residents	Brian Green	463	20.42	New
Conservative	Gregory Pugsley	412		
Liberal Democrats	William Howliston	401	14.44	▼0.29
Conservative	Hasan Imam	316		
Liberal Democrats	Penning Colin	292		
Liberal Democrats	Anthony West	289		
Registered electors		8,879		▲648
Turnout		2,244	25.27	▼15.89
Rejected ballots		16	0.71	▲0.44
Labour hold				
Labour hold				
Labour hold				

=== 1994 election ===
The election took place on 5 May 1994.

1994 Hounslow London Borough Council election: Feltham North
Party	Candidate	Votes	%	±%
Labour	Michael Hunt	1,925	60.98	▲5.96
Labour	John Chatt	1,923		
Labour	Stuart Walmsley	1,876		
Conservative	Allan Wilson	784	24.29	▼10.76
Conservative	David Giles	755		
Conservative	Roy Hine	742		
Liberal Democrats	William Howliston	508	14.73	▲4.80
Liberal Democrats	Anthony West	460		
Liberal Democrats	Sarah Thomas-Bengry	414		
Registered electors		8,231		▼521
Turnout		3,388	41.16	▼3.02
Rejected ballots		9	0.27	▼0.09
Labour hold				
Labour hold				
Labour hold				

=== 1990 election ===
The election took place on 3 May 1990.

1990 Hounslow London Borough Council election: Feltham North
Party	Candidate	Votes	%	±%
Labour	Michael Hunt	2,044	55.02	
Labour	John Chatt	2,012		
Labour	Stuart Walmsley	1,944		
Conservative	Deborah Beach	1,312	35.05	
Conservative	Andrew Cleary	1,286		
Conservative	Richard Coats	1,223		
Liberal Democrats	Ruth Hill	385	9.93	
Liberal Democrats	Norman de Laune	336		
Registered electors		8,752		
Turnout		3,867	44.18	
Rejected ballots		14	0.36	
Labour hold		Swing		
Labour hold		Swing		
Labour hold		Swing		

=== 1986 election ===
The election took place on 8 May 1986.

1986 Hounslow London Borough Council election: Feltham North
Party	Candidate	Votes	%	±%
Labour	David Connor	1,643		
Labour	Michael Hunt	1,620		
Labour	John Chatt	1,569		
Conservative	Charles Stuart	1,027		
Conservative	Barbara Wilson	1,006		
Conservative	Neville Aris	978		
Alliance (SDP)	Raymond Jessop	384		
Alliance (Liberal)	Peter Sharples	361		
Turnout				
Labour hold		Swing		
Labour hold		Swing		
Labour hold		Swing		

=== 1982 election ===
The election took place on 6 May 1982.

1982 Hounslow London Borough Council election: Feltham North
Party	Candidate	Votes	%	±%
Labour	William Nimmo	1,252		
Labour	David Connor	1,226		
Labour	Leslie Bawn	1,199		
Conservative	Richard Kean	1,131		
Conservative	Allan Wilson	1,126		
Conservative	Neville Aris	1,074		
Alliance (SDP)	Charles Blackwell	697		
Alliance (Liberal)	Peter Sharples	679		
Alliance (SDP)	Peter Hills	649		
Turnout				
Labour gain from Conservative		Swing		
Labour gain from Conservative		Swing		
Labour gain from Conservative		Swing		

=== 1978 election ===
The election took place on 4 May 1978.

1978 Hounslow London Borough Council election: Feltham North
Party	Candidate	Votes	%	±%
Conservative	Allan Wilson	1,473		
Conservative	Neville Aris	1,453		
Conservative	Richard Kean	1,439		
Labour	Walter Miles	1,421		
Labour	John Flanagan	1,418		
Labour	Patricia McCarthy	1,346		
Liberal	Larraine DeLaune	208		
Liberal	Peter Sharples	192		
Turnout				
Conservative win (new boundaries)				
Conservative win (new boundaries)				
Conservative win (new boundaries)				

== 1964–1978 Hounslow council elections ==
=== 1974 election ===
The election took place on 2 May 1974.

1974 Hounslow London Borough Council election: Feltham North
Party	Candidate	Votes	%	±%
Labour	John Tilley	1,324		
Labour	Walter Miles	1,302		
Labour	Wendy Bates	1,252		
Conservative	P. Schagen	925		
Conservative	M. Birch	915		
Conservative	A. Wilson	910		
Communist	A. Hodges	83		
Turnout				
Labour hold		Swing		
Labour hold		Swing		
Labour hold		Swing		

=== 1971 election ===
The election took place on 13 May 1971.

1971 Hounslow London Borough Council election: Feltham North
Party	Candidate	Votes	%	±%
Labour	Walter Miles	2,269		
Labour	Jack Brown	2,248		
Labour	John Tilley	2,241		
Conservative	A. Palmer	811		
Conservative	F. Blake	795		
Conservative	J. Harvey	790		
Turnout				
Labour hold		Swing		
Labour hold		Swing		
Labour hold		Swing		

=== 1968 election ===
The election took place on 9 May 1968.

1968 Hounslow London Borough Council election: Feltham North
Party	Candidate	Votes	%	±%
Labour	William Gamble	1,465		
Labour	John Barr	1,395		
Labour	Walter Miles	1,391		
Conservative	J. Harvey	1,230		
Conservative	J. Hemington	1,202		
Conservative	A. Palmer	1,177		
Liberal	J. Bird	321		
Communist	A. Hodges	189		
Turnout				
Labour hold		Swing		
Labour hold		Swing		
Labour hold		Swing		

=== 1967 by-election ===
The by-election took place on 11 May 1967, following the resignation of Michael Fitzgerald.

1967 Feltham North by-election
Party	Candidate	Votes	%	±%
Labour	Fred Powe	1,569		
Conservative	C. Balston	995		
Liberal	W. Cavanagh	303		
Turnout			39.65	
Labour hold		Swing		

=== 1964 election ===
The election took place on 7 May 1964.

1964 Hounslow London Borough Council election: Feltham North
Party	Candidate	Votes	%	±%
Labour	Mike Slattery	2,106		
Labour	Walter Miles	2,087		
Labour	Michael Fitzgerald	2,074		
Conservative	F. Parsons	669		
Conservative	G. Papworth	668		
Conservative	E. Elliott	642		
Liberal	A. Thames	297		
Liberal	W. Humby	279		
Liberal	W. Stannell	267		
Communist	A. Hodges	84		
Turnout		3,109	43.4	
Labour win (new seat)				
Labour win (new seat)				
Labour win (new seat)				
