= Bedfont (ward) =

Electoral ward in London, England

- Electoral ward for the Hounslow London Borough Council
- Borough: Hounslow
- County: Greater London
- Population: 15,149 (2021)
- Electorate: 10,430 (2026)
- Major settlements: Bedfont
- Area: 5.151 km²

Current electoral ward
- Created: 2002
- Councillors: Adesh Farmahan; Russell Haynes; Gerry Lieberman

Bedfont is an electoral ward in the London Borough of Hounslow. The ward was first used in the 2002 elections and elects three councillors to Hounslow London Borough Council.

== Geography ==
The ward is named after the suburb of Bedfont.

== Councillors ==
Election	Councillors		
2026	Adesh Farmahan (Labour)	Russell Haynes (Reform)	Gerry Lieberman (Reform)
2022	Lily Bath (Labour)	Adesh Farmahan (Labour)	Raghwinder Siddhu (Labour)
2018	Adriana Gheorghe (Labour)	Javed Akhunzada (Labour)	Raghwinder Singh Siddhu (Labour)
2014	Keith Anderson (Labour)	Sachin Gupta (Labour)	Samantha Christie (Labour)
2010	Sachin Gupta (Labour)	Liz Mammatt (Conservative)	Tom Bruce (Labour)
2006	John Howliston (Liberal Democrats)	Peter Hills (Hounslow Independent Alliance)	Jiwan Virk (Labour)
2002	John Howliston (Liberal Democrats)	Peter Hills (Liberal Democrats)	David Hughes (Labour)

== Elections ==
=== 2026 Hounslow London Borough Council election ===
Bedfont (3)
Party	Candidate	Votes	%	±%
Reform	Russell Haynes	1,393	33.2	New
Reform	Gerry Lieberman	1,307	31.2	New
Labour	Adesh Farmahan	1,253	29.9	−21.9
Reform	Jagdeep Jassal	1,240	29.6	New
Labour	Komalpreet Sachdeva	1,152	27.5	−24.3
Labour	Harjinder Sohi	1,101	26.3	−17.6
Conservative	Haresh Bhalsod	985	23.5	−15.3
Conservative	Buddhiman Darnal	974	23.2	−13.5
Conservative	Karna Gurung	944	22.5	−8.6
Green	Kalid Mohamud	739	17.6	+4.3
Liberal Democrats	Donal Quinn	444	10.6	New
Turnout		4,190	40.2	+8.4
Reform gain from Labour		Swing	19.1	
Reform gain from Labour		Swing	17.4	
Labour hold		Swing		

=== 2022 Hounslow London Borough Council election ===
Bedfont (3)
Party	Candidate	Votes	%	±%
Labour	Lily Bath	1,768	55.1	
Labour	Adesh Kumar Farmahan	1,663	51.8	
Labour	Raghwinder Singh Siddhu	1,627	50.7	
Conservative	Peter George Edwards	1,245	38.8	
Conservative	John Osborn	1,162	36.7	
Conservative	Hareshkumar Trikamlal Bhalsod	999	31.1	
Green	Dave Wetzel	429	13.3	
Turnout		3,211	31.8	
Labour hold		Swing		
Labour hold		Swing		
Labour hold		Swing		
