= Hounslow London Borough Council elections =

Local elections in England

A map showing the wards of Hounslow since 2022

Hounslow London Borough Council in London, England is elected every four years. 62 councillors are elected from 22 wards, with by-elections held to fill any vacancies between elections.

== Council elections ==
Year	Labour	Conservative	Liberal Democrats (Note: Liberal Party, 1964–1968 and 1974–1978; Liberal and Independent Alliance, 1971; SDP–Liberal Alliance, 1982–1986.)	Reform	Green	Community Group	ABEEC	Hounslow Independent Alliance	Independent	Council control after election
1964	48	12	0	–	–	–	–	–	–	Labour
1968	7	53	0	–	–	–	–	–	–	Conservative
1971 (Note: Boundary changes took place but the number of seats remained the same.)	47	13	0	–	–	–	–	–	–	Labour
1974	37	23	0	–	–	–	–	–	–	Labour
1978 (Note: Boundary changes took place but the number of seats remained the same.)	36	24	0	–	–	–	–	–	–	Labour
1982	33	27	0	–	–	–	–	–	–	Labour
1986	40	17	3	–	–	–	–	–	–	Labour
1990	44	15	1	–	0	–	–	–	–	Labour
1994 (Note: Boundary changes took place but the number of seats remained the same. (Note: The Ealing, Hammersmith and Fulham, and Hounslow (London Borough Boundaries) Order 1993) (Note: The Ealing, Hillingdon and Hounslow (London Borough Boundaries) Order 1993) (Note: The Greater London and Surrey (County and London Borough Boundaries) (No. 4) Order 1993) (Note: The Heathrow Airport (County and London Borough Boundaries) Order 1993))	49	6	5	–	0	0	–	–	–	Labour
1998	44	11	4	–	0	1	–	–	–	Labour
2002 (Note: Boundary changes took place but the number of seats remained the same.)	36	15	5	–	0	3	1	–	–	Labour
2006	24	23	5	–	0	6	–	2	–	No overall control
2010	35	25	0	–	0	0	–	0	–	Labour
2014	49	11	0	–	0	0	–	–	–	Labour
2018	51	9	0	–	0	–	–	–	–	Labour
2022 (Note: Boundary changes increased the number of seats by two.)	52	10	0	–	0	–	–	–	–	Labour
2026	32	17	1	8	3	–	–	–	1	Labour

=== Borough result maps ===
2002 results map

2006 results map

2010 results map

2014 results map

2018 results map

2022 results map

2026 results map

== By-election results ==
=== 1964–1968 ===
The first election to the newly created London Borough of Hounslow was held on 7 May 1964, ahead of the new council assuming its full powers on 1 April 1965. The election returned 48 Labour councillors and 12 Conservative councillors from 60 seats. London borough councils at the time also included aldermen, equal to one-sixth of the number of councillors, elected by the councillors from among themselves or other qualified persons. Several by-elections were subsequently held during the 1964–1968 term.

=== 1968-1971 ===
Heston East by-election, 20 June 1968
Party	Candidate	Votes	%	±%
Conservative	M. Venn	1100		
Labour	M. Nicholls	413		
Liberal	E. Charrington	234		
Turnout			21.8%	

Spring Grove by-election, 20 June 1968
Party	Candidate	Votes	%	±%
Conservative	H. Butler	1641		
Labour	K. Baldry	146		
Turnout			23.7%	

Isleworth South by-election, 24 October 1968
Party	Candidate	Votes	%	±%
Labour	G. McKay	1207		
Conservative	G. Taylor	956		
Communist	B. DomsalIa	47		
Turnout			35.8%	

=== 1971-1974 ===
Clifden by-election, 1 July 1971
Party	Candidate	Votes	%	±%
Labour	P. Scott	1,826		
Conservative	M. Downes	670		
Turnout			33.2%	

East Bedfont by-election, 1 July 1971
Party	Candidate	Votes	%	±%
Labour	J. Duffy	1,577		
Labour	H. Brown	1,560		
Conservative	J. Potter	555		
Conservative	T. Perkins	550		
Liberal	J. A. Quinn	116		
Liberal	J. I. Quinn	114		
Turnout			26.4%	

Heston West by-election, 1 July 1971
Party	Candidate	Votes	%	±%
Labour	A. Wallis	1,517		
Conservative	V. Hopkins	667		
Turnout			28.5%	

Spring Grove by-election, 6 July 1972
Party	Candidate	Votes	%	±%
Conservative	G. Henniker	1,724		
Labour	K. Butler	605		
Turnout			28.8%	

Riverside by-election, 15 March 1973
Party	Candidate	Votes	%	±%
Labour	A. Bearne	1,516		
Conservative	T. Russell	1,505		
Turnout			38.6%	

=== 1974-1978 ===
Heston West by-election, 6 February 1975
Party	Candidate	Votes	%	±%
Labour	Audrey Padley	1,357		
Conservative	Bramwell Ballard	1,282		
Liberal	Michael Simmons	183		
Turnout			37.0	

Cranford by-election, 11 December 1975
Party	Candidate	Votes	%	±%
Labour	Henry North	887		
Conservative	Bramwell Ballard	791		
National Front	James Wood	122		
Turnout			22.1	

Feltham South by-election, 11 December 1975
Party	Candidate	Votes	%	±%
Labour	Kerry Butler	962		
Conservative	Wendy Rogers	880		
National Front	Malcolm Hutton	68		
Communist	David Howell	59		
Turnout			28.4	

Hounslow Central by-election, 25 March 1976
Party	Candidate	Votes	%	±%
Labour	Michael Parker	1,400		
Conservative	David Hannay	1,299		
Ratepayers	Douglas Evans	486		
National Front	Josephine Reid	161		
Liberal	Michael Simmons	147		
National Party	Thomas Carnie	34		
Turnout			51.5	

Heston West by-election, 29 April 1976
Party	Candidate	Votes	%	±%
Labour	Jeffery Spence	1,395		
Conservative	Bramwell Ballard	1,234		
Heston Ratepayers Association	Nicholas Guyatt	687		
Liberal	Charles Baily	193		
National Party	Malcolm Hutton	181		
Turnout			49.3	

Clifden by-election, 7 October 1976
Party	Candidate	Votes	%	±%
Conservative	Robert Stratton	1,238		
Labour	Roy Hall	1,062		
Liberal	Audrey Maclean	619		
National Front	Peter Attridge	346		
Turnout			46.6	

Heston East by-election, 24 November 1977
Party	Candidate	Votes	%	±%
Conservative	Bramwell Ballard	1,562		
Heston Ratepayers Association	Roger Owen	769		
Labour	Paul Maynard	769		
National Front	Josephine Reid	163		
Turnout			33.9	

=== 1990-1994 ===
Cranford by-election, 20 September 1990
Party	Candidate	Votes	%	±%
Labour	Harbakhsh Khangura	1,270	54.4	
Conservative	Jack Austin	771	33.0	
Green	Brett Stacey	204	8.7	
Liberal Democrats	Mohammad Rahman	88	3.8	
Turnout			32.1	
Labour hold		Swing		

The by-election was called following the death of Cllr Henry North.

Hounslow South by-election, 9 July 1992
Party	Candidate	Votes	%	±%
Conservative	Anthony Fairfield	1,193		
Conservative	Wojciech Klamut	1,109		
Labour	Christine Hay	894		
Labour	Balbhadar Jain	884		
Liberal Democrats	Laurance Mann	166		
Liberal Democrats	Ivan Berti	157		
Green	Martin Friend	123		
Green	John Bradley	122		
Turnout			36.7	
Conservative hold		Swing		
Conservative hold		Swing		

The by-election was called following the resignations of Cllrs Valerie Marks and William Martin.

Hounslow South by-election, 22 April 1993
Party	Candidate	Votes	%	±%
Conservative	Walter Hill	1,250	44.0	
Labour	Christine Hay	1,217	42.9	
Liberal Democrats	Iven Berti	262	9.2	
Independent	William Chatterton	110	3.9	
Turnout			36.6	
Conservative hold		Swing		

The by-election was called following the resignation of Cllr Peter Leggett.

Isleworth South by-election, 8 July 1993
Party	Candidate	Votes	%	±%
Labour	Valerie Lamey	831	34.5	
Liberal Democrats	Laurence Mann	713	29.6	
Conservative	Gregory Pugsley	482	20.0	
Independent Labour	William Raymond	198	8.2	
Independent	Thomas Reader	182	7.6	
Turnout			31.8	
Labour hold		Swing		

The by-election was called following the death of Cllr Peter Caldwell.

Feltham South by-election, 11 November 1993
Party	Candidate	Votes	%	±%
Liberal Democrats	Royston Haines	984	38.1	
Labour	Lynda Walmsley	969	37.5	
Conservative	Anthony Gurrin	367	14.2	
National Front	Raymond O'Connor	261	10.1	
Turnout			39.9	
Liberal Democrats gain from Labour Co-op		Swing		

The by-election was called following the death of Cllr Edward Pauling.

=== 1994-1998 ===
Hanworth by-election, 31 August 1995
Party	Candidate	Votes	%	±%
Labour	Les Bawn	1,315		
Liberal Democrats	Ann-Marie Mallon	993		
Conservative	John Bolding	208		
BNP	Warren Glass	119		
Green	Stephen Smith	46		
Turnout				
Labour gain from Liberal Democrats		Swing		

The by-election was called following the resignation of Cllr Michael Hoban.

Isleworth North by-election, 17 July 1997
Party	Candidate	Votes	%	±%
Labour	Janet Tindall	940	46.6	−9.9
Conservative	Adrian Lee	555	27.5	+3.2
Liberal Democrats	Gareth Hartwell	393	19.5	+6.6
Community Group	Caroline Andrews	131	6.5	+6.5
Majority		385	19.1	
Turnout		2,019	25.3	
Labour hold		Swing		

The by-election was called following the resignation of Cllr Antony Louki.

=== 1998-2002 ===
Gunnersbury by-election, 12 November 1998
Party	Candidate	Votes	%	±%
Labour	Tristan Brunnell	750	46.0	−12.2
Conservative	Justin Reynolds	523	32.1	+4.5
Liberal Democrats	Paul Rustad	231	14.2	+0.1
Independent	Donald Golding	125	7.7	+7.7
Majority		227	13.9	
Turnout		1,629	21.3	
Labour hold		Swing		

The by-election was called following the resignation of Cllr Peter Nathan.

East Bedfont by-election, 19 October 2000
Party	Candidate	Votes	%	±%
Liberal Democrats	John Howliston	573	42.0	+17.4
Labour	Caroline Imrie	372	27.3	−11.7
Conservative	John Bolding	283	20.8	+0.7
Independent	Brian Green	135	9.9	−6.4
Majority		201	14.7	
Turnout		1,363	15.3	
Liberal Democrats gain from Labour		Swing		

The by-election was called following the resignation of Cllr Brian Price.

Hounslow Central by-election, 19 October 2000
Party	Candidate	Votes	%	±%
Labour	Robert Whatley	802	59.3	+5.2
Conservative	Ronald Baker	304	22.5	+3.9
Independent	Genevieve Hibbs	135	10.0	−5.4
Liberal Democrats	Mohammad Rahman	112	8.3	−3.7
Majority		498	36.8	
Turnout		1,353	17.5	
Labour hold		Swing		

The by-election was called following the resignation of Cllr Pamela Wharfe.

Chiswick Riverside by-election, 8 March 2001
Party	Candidate	Votes	%	±%
Conservative	Felicity Barwood	939	44.5	+6.9
Liberal Democrats	Paul Rustad	607	28.8	−4.2
Labour	Valerie Yates	565	26.8	−2.6
Majority		332	15.7	
Turnout		2,111	26.7	
Conservative hold		Swing		

The by-election was called following the death of Cllr Josephine Langton.

=== 2002-2006 ===
Hounslow South by-election, 3 October 2002
Party	Candidate	Votes	%	±%
Labour	Pritam Grewal	866	38.0	+3.0
Community Group	Paul Fisher	657	28.8	+15.6
Conservative	John Davies	594	26.0	−9.0
Liberal Democrats	Michael Wilson	156	7.2	−4.2
Majority		209	9.2	
Turnout		2,282	27.9	
Labour gain from Conservative		Swing		

The by-election was called following the death of Cllr Walter Hill.

Heston West by-election, 30 September 2004
Party	Candidate	Votes	%	±%
Labour	Elizabeth Hughes	596	40.7	−19.0
Liberal Democrats	Satnam Khalsa	461	31.5	+31.5
Conservative	Bhupindar Lakhanpaul	406	27.8	+5.2
Majority		135	9.2	
Turnout		1,463	17.8	
Labour hold		Swing		

The by-election was called following the death of Cllr John Gray.

Heston East by-election, 25 November 2004
Party	Candidate	Votes	%	±%
Labour	Shivcharn Gill	593	42.9	+15.1
Conservative	Herdeep Singh	432	31.3	+5.3
Liberal Democrats	Syed Akhtar	356	25.8	+0.0
Majority		161	11.6	
Turnout		1,381	16.7	
Labour hold		Swing		

The by-election was called following the death of Cllr Roger Clarke.

Chiswick Homefields by-election, 9 December 2004
Party	Candidate	Votes	%	±%
Conservative	Gerald McGregor	878	58.1	+12.7
Labour	Valerie Yates	430	28.5	+4.7
Green	Martin Bleach	203	13.4	+4.2
Majority		448	29.6	
Turnout		1,511	18.6	
Conservative hold		Swing		

The by-election was called following the resignation of Cllr Sally Gilson.

Osterley & Spring Grove by-election, 25 August 2005
Party	Candidate	Votes	%	±%
Conservative	Sheila O'Reilly	1,008	52.2	+11.3
Labour	Bandna Chopra	524	27.1	−2.0
Community Group	Andrew Sibley	223	11.6	+2.2
Liberal Democrats	Naseem Pankhida	175	9.1	−2.0
Majority		484	25.1	
Turnout		1,930	22.3	
Conservative hold		Swing		

The by-election was called following the death of Cllr Premila Bhanderi.

=== 2006-2010 ===
Hanworth Park by-election, 12 July 2007
Party	Candidate	Votes	%	±%
Conservative	Paul Jabbal	1,054	41.1	−3.3
Labour	Colin Eilar	729	28.4	+2.1
Liberal Democrats	Simon Martin	507	19.8	+4.2
Independent	Vanessa Smith	201	7.8	−5.9
Green	Anthony Agius	73	2.8	+2.8
Majority		325	12.7	
Turnout		2,564	32.3	
Conservative hold		Swing		

The by-election was called following the resignation of Cllr Harley Buckner.

Chiswick Riverside by-election, 13 December 2007
Party	Candidate	Votes	%	±%
Conservative	Thomas Hearn	1,207	61.1	+16.1
Labour	Edward Mayne	414	21.0	+3.2
Liberal Democrats	Phyllis Ballantyne	250	12.7	−7.1
Green	Martin Bleach	103	5.2	−12.2
Majority		793	40.1	
Turnout		1,974	24.6	
Conservative hold		Swing		

The by-election was called following the death of Cllr Robert Kinghorn.

=== 2010-2014 ===
There were no by-elections.

=== 2014-2018 ===
Brentford by-election, 9 July 2015
Party	Candidate	Votes	%	±%
Labour	Guy Lambert	1,292	54.0	+7.9
Conservative	Patrick Barr	664	27.7	+13.2
Green	Diane Scott	209	8.7	−4.8
Liberal Democrats	Joe Bourke	116	4.8	−1.4
UKIP	George Radulski	113	4.7	−7.4
Majority		628	26.2	
Turnout		2,394		
Labour hold		Swing		

The by-election was called following the resignation of Cllr Ruth Cadbury MP.

Cranford by-election, 11 February 2016
Party	Candidate	Votes	%	±%
Labour	Sukhbir Dhaliwal	1,264	54.7	+0.0
Conservative	Sukhdev Singh Maras	638	27.6	+1.7
Liberal Democrats	Hina Malik	265	11.5	+5.3
UKIP	George Radulski	96	4.2	−9.1
Green	Nico Fekete	48	2.1	+2.1
Majority		626	27.1	
Turnout		2,311		
Labour hold		Swing		

The by-election was called following the death of Cllr Sohan Sangha.

=== 2018-2022 ===
Feltham North by-election, 12 December 2019
Party	Candidate	Votes	%	±%
Conservative	Kuldeep Tak	2,025	43.5	+16.8
Labour	Adesh Farmahan	1,975	42.5	−1.5
Liberal Democrats	Joseph Bourke	351	7.5	−1.0
Green	Ioana-Simona Voicila	209	4.5	−3.5
Independent	Nooralhaq Nasimi	91	2.0	+2.0
Majority		50	1.1	
Turnout		4,651		
Conservative gain from Labour		Swing		

The by-election was called following the death of Cllr John Chatt.

Heston West by-election, 12 December 2019
Party	Candidate	Votes	%	±%
Labour	Balraj Sarai	3,440	64.4	−7.2
Conservative	Haresh Bhalsod	1,312	24.6	+9.3
Liberal Democrats	Hina Malik	377	7.1	−0.8
Green	Jon Elkon	212	4.0	−1.2
Majority		2,128	39.8	
Turnout		5,341		
Labour hold		Swing		

The by-election was called following the death of Cllr Rajinder Bath.

Cranford by-election, 6 May 2021
Party	Candidate	Votes	%	±%
Labour	Devina Ram	2,129	52.0	−13.7
Conservative	Shabnam Nasimi	1,191	29.1	+4.7
Independent	Gurpal Singh Virdi	355	8.7	+8.7
Green	Martin Bleach	284	6.9	+2.5
Liberal Democrats	Sangam Gul	133	3.3	−2.3
Majority		938	22.9	
Turnout		4,092		
Labour hold		Swing		

The by-election was called following the death of Cllr Poonam Dhillon.

Hounslow Heath by-election, 6 May 2021
Party	Candidate	Votes	%	±%
Labour	Madeeha Asim	2,179	52.0	−11.1
Conservative	Nadia Jarche	1,150	27.4	+7.9
Liberal Democrats	Sally Billenness	386	9.2	+0.9
Green	Britta Goodman	322	7.7	−1.4
TUSC	Sukhmani Kaur Sethi	154	3.7	+3.7
Majority		1,029	24.6	
Turnout		4,191		
Labour hold		Swing		

The by-election was called following the resignation of Cllr Hina Kiani.

=== 2022-2026 ===
Heston West by-election, 9 March 2023
Party	Candidate	Votes	%	±%
Labour	Emma Siddhu	1,104	52.4	
Liberal Democrats	Chaitan Shah	470	22.3	
Conservative	Muraad Chaudhry	419	19.9	
Green	Rashid Wahab	65	3.1	
Independent	Bart Kuleba	48	2.3	
Majority		634	30.1	
Turnout		2,106		
Labour hold		Swing		

The by-election was called following the resignation of Cllr Adriana Gheorghe.

Brentford West by-election, 2 May 2024
Party	Candidate	Votes	%	±%
Labour	Emma Yates	988	36.6	
Independent	Theo Dennisson	798	29.6	
Conservative	Michael Denniss	414	15.4	
Green	Freya Summersgill	338	12.5	
Liberal Democrats	William Francis	126	4.7	
TUSC	John Viner	33	1.2	
Majority		190	7.0	
Turnout		2,697		
Labour hold		Swing		

The by-election was called following the resignation of Cllr Lara Parizotto.

Hanworth Village by-election, 4 July 2024
Party	Candidate	Votes	%	±%
Labour	Aysha Tariq	2,027	40.0	
Conservative	Vanita Kanda	1,161	22.9	
Liberal Democrats	William Francis	812	16.0	
Independent	Zubair Awan	549	10.8	
Green	Rashid Wahab	515	10.2	
Majority		866	17.1	
Turnout		5,064		
Labour hold		Swing		

The by-election was called following the resignation of Cllr Noreen Kaleem.

Brentford East by-election, 6 March 2025
Party	Candidate	Votes	%	±%
Labour	Max Mosley	430	48.1	−14.7
Reform	David Kerr	197	22.0	+22.0
Conservative	Christine Cunniffe	99	11.1	−7.5
Green	Rashid Wahab	89	10.0	−8.5
Liberal Democrats	Bernice Roust	79	8.8	+8.8
Majority		233	26.1	
Turnout		894		
Labour hold		Swing		

The by-election was called following the resignation of Cllr Rhys Williams.

Syon and Brentford Lock by-election, 6 March 2025
Party	Candidate	Votes	%	±%
Independent	Theo Dennison	615	33.5	+12.3
Labour	Jennifer Prain	603	32.8	−5.0
Green	Freya Summersgill	218	11.9	−4.2
Conservative	Christine Cunniffe	150	8.2	−6.6
Reform	Chinmay Parulekar	149	8.1	+8.1
Liberal Democrats	Jack Ballentyne	102	5.6	−4.5
Majority		12	0.7	
Turnout		1,837		
Independent gain from Labour		Swing		

The by-election was called following the resignation of Cllr Balraj Sarai.

Cranford by-election, 21 August 2025
Party	Candidate	Votes	%	±%
Labour	Hira Singh Dhillon	951	40.7	−12.6
Conservative	Gurpreet Singh Sidhu	679	29.1	+10.0
Reform	Khushwant Singh	405	17.3	+17.3
Green	Gurpal Singh Virdi	156	6.7	−7.5
Liberal Democrats	Miruna Leitoiu	145	6.2	+6.2
Majority		272	11.6	
Turnout		2,336		
Labour hold		Swing		

The by-election was called following the death of Cllr Sukhbir Singh Dhaliwal.
