= Lord Ranger =

Lord Ranger may refer to:

- Rami Ranger, Baron Ranger (born 1947), British-Indian businessman
- Kulveer Ranger, Baron Ranger of Northwood (born 1975), British strategy and communications executive
