= The Community Group (London Borough of Hounslow) =

Independent Community Group
- Leader: Ian Speed
- Founded: 1994
- Dissolved: 2016
- Headquarters: Isleworth
- Ideology: Localism

Website
- http://www.communitygroup.org.uk/

The Community Group, also known as the Independent Community Group (ICG), and registered with the Electoral Commission as the Community (London Borough of Hounslow), was a small political party based in Isleworth in the London Borough of Hounslow.

The party was founded on 1 January 1994 as the Isleworth Community Group to build a "vibrant community" and to advocate public participation within the decision making processes. It was non-ideological, aiming to reflect local public opinion, and criticised the "incestuous nature of establishment politics".

== Elections ==
The first member of the group joined the council after the 1998 local elections.

Following the 2006 local elections, the group had six councillors, representing Isleworth (Paul Fisher, Phil Andrews and Genevieve Hibbs) and Syon wards (Shirley Fisher, Caroline Andrews and Jon Hardy). They accepted an offer to form a coalition administration with the Conservative group of councillors. This lasted until the Community Group lost all their seats to the Labour Party in the 2010 local elections. The group then debated whether or not to field council candidates in the future. It ultimately did stand in the 2014 local elections, but was again unsuccessful, and in 2016 decided to dissolve.

== Activities ==
The party had a motion passed in 2007 that called on the council not to invite the local MPs, Ann Keen and Alan Keen to council events, because the MPs had protested about the inclusion of former National Front member Phil Andrews in the council's new decision-making executive. It did not stand in the 2010 general election in an attempt to increase the chances of the Keens losing, although Alan Keen held his seat by a comfortable margin.

In March 2009, the party's councillors opposed the expansion of the sewage works in Mogden. The ICG then helped organise a protest against the expansion in April 2009.

== Members ==
Genevieve Hibbs, a former nurse first elected to represent Isleworth in 2002, was the Mayor of Hounslow for a year from May 2008.

Phil Andrews was a member of the National Front from 1977 to 1989, which he says he is "indescribably" ashamed of and now campaigns against racism.

== Council elections ==
Election	Votes		Seats	Position	Role in Council
Election	#	%	#	Position	Role in Council
1998		1.7	1 / 60	3rd	Opposition
2002	2,626	5.6	3 / 60	4th	Opposition
2006	4,008	6.0	6 / 60	▲3rd	Joint Control with Conservatives
2010	3,919	3.3	0 / 60	▼5th	No seats
2014	1,912	2.4	0 / 60	▼6th	No seats
