= Kulveer Ranger =

British life peer and strategic adviser

The Right Honourable The Lord Ranger of Northwood
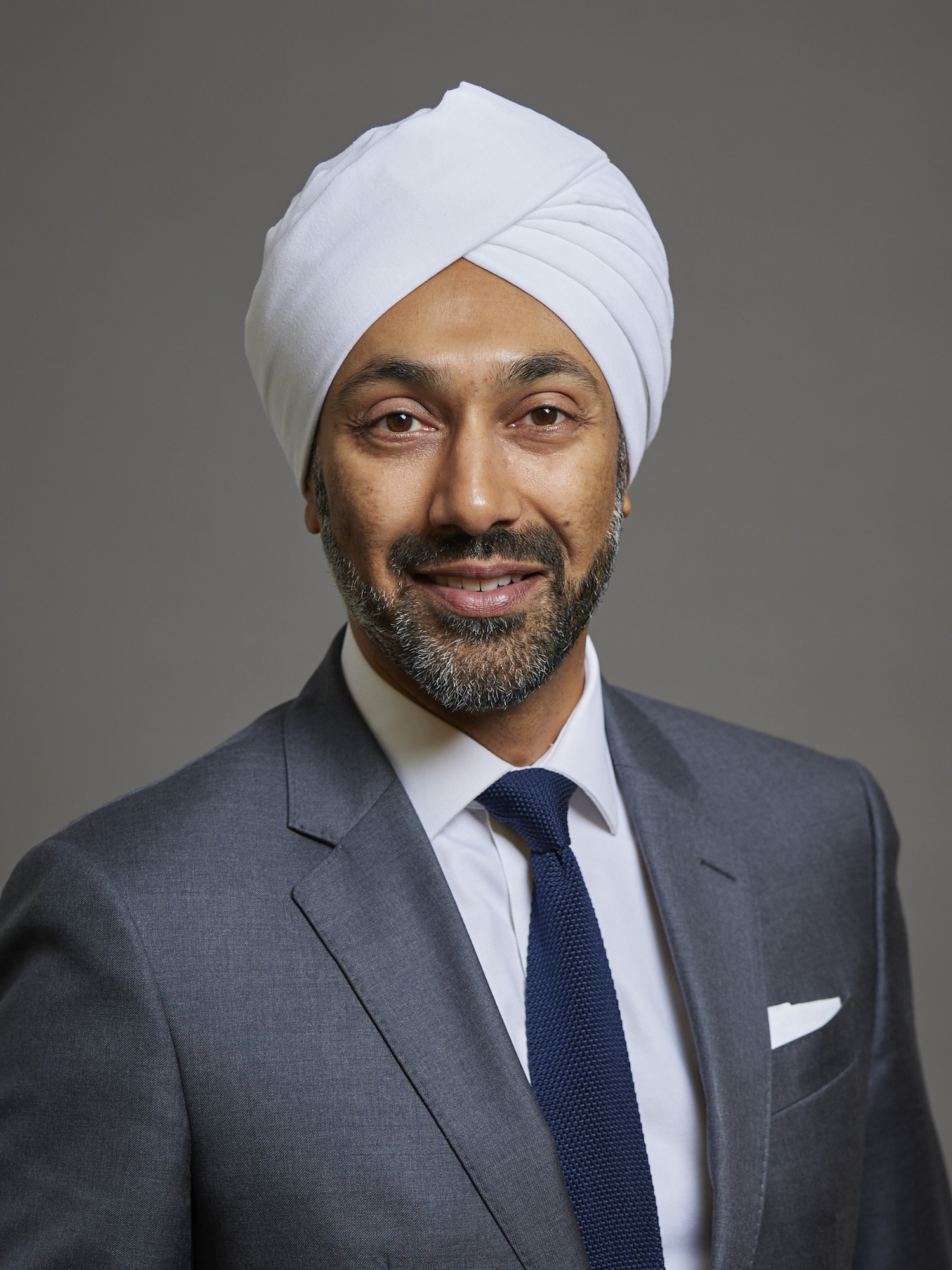
- Official portrait, 2023

Member of the House of Lords
- Lord Temporal
- Life peerage 11 July 2023

Personal details
- Born: Kulveer Singh Ranger; 21 February 1975 (age 51) London, England
- Party: Conservative
- Education: University College London
- Occupation: Management consultant
- Known for: Developing the Oyster Card and the Barclays Cycle Hire scheme for London

Kulveer Singh Ranger, Baron Ranger of Northwood (born 21 February 1975) is a member of the UK House of Lords since 2023, having previously worked in the technology and transport sectors. Prior to joining City Hall, he had worked extensively in the UK transport sector and played a significant role in the introduction of the London Oyster card system.

Ranger was Director for Transport policy, Environment policy and Digital London from 2008 to 2012 during the first mayoralty of Boris Johnson. He oversaw the delivery of the London Cycle Hire Scheme, assisted with the preparation for the 2012 Olympic Games and established the Digital Office for London.

== Career ==
=== Early career ===
Ranger was a management consultant at The Nichols Group and was a member of the London Underground Prestige PFI team that implemented the London Oyster card in 2003.

=== City Hall ===
After Boris Johnson's victory in the 2008 London mayoral election, Johnson selected Ranger to be his director for transport policy. From 2008 he oversaw all transport policy for London and sat on the board of TfL. Ranger led on initiatives including the new Routemaster Bus, public realm improvements such as Oxford Circus, Exhibition Road, and Legible London, and the launch of the Santander Cycle Scheme (Barclays Cycle Hire at the time).

In 2011, he became Director for Environment and Digital London, with his work resulting in a focus on ‘Cleaner Air for London’ with a range of projects and campaigns to improve London's air quality. He established the London Electric Vehicle Partnership which led to the development of the 'Source London' charging network with a number of new electric car charging points established in London to encourage a higher take up of electric vehicles. Ranger also supported the development of the London Datastore.

=== Industry ===
Ranger joined the French multinational digital services company Atos and held senior executive positions across strategy and corporate communications from 2015 to 2023. He was a board member at techUK for six years till 2023. On 25 February 2025, Ranger was voted to be appointed as the next Chair of the British-Serbian Chamber of Commerce.

=== Political ===
Ranger was selected as the Conservative prospective parliamentary candidate (PPC) for Makerfield at the 2005 general election, but lost to the incumbent, then Chairman of the Labour Party, Sir Ian McCartney. He unsuccessfully stood in the ward of Syon at the 2006 Hounslow London Borough Council election.

From 2007 to 2008, Ranger was appointed as Vice-chair of the Conservative Party. Ranger was part of the Conservative A-List for the 2010 general election but did not stand. He was on the long list to be the Conservative party candidate for the 2021 London mayoral election.

==== House of Lords ====
Ranger was nominated for a life peerage in Boris Johnson's resignation honours list. On 11 July 2023, he was created Baron Ranger of Northwood, of Pimlico in the City of Westminster, and was introduced to the House of Lords on 20 July. Ranger gave his maiden speech on 14 November 2023.

In May 2024, the House of Lords Conduct Committee found that Ranger had drunkenly bullied and harassed two members of parliamentary staff in the House of Commons Strangers' Bar in January 2024. The committee recommended that Ranger be suspended for three weeks and denied access to the bars of the House of Lords for twelve months. Ranger resigned the Conservative whip in the Lords and sat as a non-affiliated peer. The committee's recommendations were approved by the House of Lords on 18 July. Following his suspension, the Conservative whip was restored to Ranger on 9 August.

Ranger was appointed to the House of Lords Science and Technology Select Committee in January 2025. He is Vice-chair for the All-Party Parliamentary Group on AI. He is also co-chair of the All-Party Parliamentary Group for Digital Money and Digital Markets.

== Family and early life ==
Ranger is a Sikh, born in Hammersmith in West London, the son of Indian parents. His grandfather Gurnam Singh Sahni set up the first British-Asian newspaper, The Punjab Times, in the mid-1960s.

Ranger gained an honours degree in architecture from University College London. He also has a business diploma from Kingston Business School.

== See also ==
- List of British Sikhs

Orders of precedence in the United Kingdom
Preceded by The Lord Kempsell	Gentlemen; Baron Ranger of Northwood	Followed by Ben Houchen
