= 1964 Hounslow London Borough Council election =

The 1964 Hounslow Council election took place on 7 May 1964 to elect members of Hounslow London Borough Council in London, England. The whole council was up for election and the Labour party gained control of the council.

== Background ==
These elections were the first to the newly formed borough. Previously elections had taken place in the Municipal Borough of Brentford and Chiswick, Municipal Borough of Heston and Isleworth and Feltham Urban District. These boroughs and districts were joined to form the new London Borough of Hounslow by the London Government Act 1963.

A total of 169 candidates stood in the election for the 60 seats being contested across 20 wards. These included a full slate from the Conservative and Labour parties, while the Liberals stood 45 candidates. Other candidates included 4 from the Communist party. All wards were three-seat wards.

This election had aldermen as well as directly elected councillors. Labour got all 10 aldermen.

The Council was elected in 1964 as a "shadow authority" but did not start operations until 1 April 1965.

== Election result ==
The results saw Labour gain the new council with a majority of 36 after winning 48 of the 60 seats. Overall turnout in the election was 46.7%. This turnout included 1,011 postal votes.

== Ward results ==
Clifden (3)
Party	Candidate	Votes	%	±%
Labour	P. C. Cleveland	2,325		
Labour	A. G. King	2,296		
Labour	E. J. Kenward	2,180		
Conservative	E. H. Tabor	1,211		
Conservative	L. J. Beach	1,197		
Conservative	Mrs. E. W. W. Basley	1,180		
Liberal	D. A. Kendall	602		
Turnout		3,804	49.4	
Labour win (new seat)				
Labour win (new seat)				
Labour win (new seat)				

Cranford (3)
Party	Candidate	Votes	%	±%
Labour	W. R. Boyce	1,536		
Labour	M. L. Watts	1,517		
Labour	R. J. Padley	1,512		
Conservative	W. Burridge	814		
Conservative	Mrs. E. M. Knight	791		
Conservative	Mrs. J. Horley	782		
Liberal	K. H. G. Potter	265		
Liberal	J. L. Binding	253		
Liberal	W. J. Wallace	245		
Turnout		2,622	45.3	
Labour win (new seat)				
Labour win (new seat)				
Labour win (new seat)				

East Bedfont (3)
Party	Candidate	Votes	%	±%
Labour	E. J. Pauling	2,251		
Labour	W. R. Sands	2,189		
Labour	H. T. Brown	1,966		
Conservative	Mrs. D. Dacombe	848		
Conservative	J. E. Hemington	801		
Conservative	D. G. Magill	791		
Liberal	G. D. Wood	550		
Liberal	E. F. Cook	421		
Liberal	R. C. Gibson	399		
Turnout		3,474	45.3	
Labour win (new seat)				
Labour win (new seat)				
Labour win (new seat)				

Feltham Central (3)
Party	Candidate	Votes	%	±%
Labour	E. Kinghorn	1,403		
Labour	Mrs. M. E. Nixon	1,392		
Labour	A. J. Sheppard	1,334		
Conservative	R. H. Williams	733		
Conservative	Mrs. E. V. Baker	715		
Conservative	L. G. Trim	715		
Liberal	G. Ord	273		
Liberal	D. A. Vorcoe	244		
Liberal	H. C. Robinson	234		
Turnout		2,386	42.5	
Labour win (new seat)				
Labour win (new seat)				
Labour win (new seat)				

Feltham North (3)
Party	Candidate	Votes	%	±%
Labour	M. P. Slattery	2,106		
Labour	W. Miles	2,087		
Labour	M. Fitzgerald	2,074		
Conservative	F. W. Parsons	669		
Conservative	Mrs. G. Papworth	668		
Conservative	E. Elliott	642		
Liberal	A. Thames	297		
Liberal	W. C. Humby	279		
Liberal	W. G. Stannell	267		
Communist	A. C. Hodges	84		
Turnout		3,109	43.4	
Labour win (new seat)				
Labour win (new seat)				
Labour win (new seat)				

Feltham South (3)
Party	Candidate	Votes	%	±%
Labour	W. E. Gamble	1,519		
Labour	Mrs. D. E. Gatehouse	1,519		
Labour	G. A. Gatehouse	1,509		
Conservative	F. A. Blake	561		
Conservative	Miss M. Desmond	555		
Conservative	F. N. Saunders	539		
Liberal	B. A. Taylor	249		
Liberal	E. E. Sear	232		
Liberal	A. R. Bathe	225		
Turnout		2,332	35.5	
Labour win (new seat)				
Labour win (new seat)				
Labour win (new seat)				

Gunnersbury (3)
Party	Candidate	Votes	%	±%
Labour	Mrs. B. M. Cross	2,021		
Labour	J. M. Carroll	1,997		
Labour	E. L. Davies	1,958		
Conservative	A. V. Sharp	1,422		
Conservative	R. L. Avery	1,407		
Conservative	D. J. R. Staples	1,398		
Liberal	Miss G. Udall	178		
Communist	G. C. T. Giles	120		
Turnout		3,618	53.8	
Labour win (new seat)				
Labour win (new seat)				
Labour win (new seat)				

Hanworth (3)
Party	Candidate	Votes	%	±%
Labour	E. Williams	1,840		
Labour	H. Nixon	1,830		
Labour	J. G. Barr	1,745		
Conservative	S. T. Hunt	443		
Conservative	Mrs. E. Hunt	430		
Conservative	V. E. Hopkins	413		
Liberal	R. P. Power	360		
Liberal	Mrs. S. Casey	257		
Liberal	D. M. Firbank	257		
Turnout		2,574	34.7	
Labour win (new seat)				
Labour win (new seat)				
Labour win (new seat)				

Heston East (3)
Party	Candidate	Votes	%	±%
Conservative	D. F. Ryan	1,767		
Conservative	D. C. L. Usher	1,726		
Conservative	C. J. Ginn	1,713		
Labour	A. W. McQuirk	1,429		
Labour	J. M. Richards	1,425		
Labour	F. Johnson	1,396		
Liberal	H. Candeland	927		
Liberal	B. E. F. Gardener	849		
Liberal	N. Clarke	815		
Turnout		4,063	51.6	
Conservative win (new seat)				
Conservative win (new seat)				
Conservative win (new seat)				

Heston West (3)
Party	Candidate	Votes	%	±%
Labour	F. J. Jansen	1,685		
Labour	J. A. Pope	1,676		
Labour	R. D. Flynn	1,463		
Conservative	B. R. Lenz	1,038		
Conservative	D. G. Podmore	1,027		
Conservative	W. T. Harrup	1,011		
Liberal	B. R. Hunter	447		
Liberal	M. H. Bird	436		
Liberal	J. A. Cates	434		
Turnout		3,186	54.6	
Labour win (new seat)				
Labour win (new seat)				
Labour win (new seat)				

Homefields (3)
Party	Candidate	Votes	%	±%
Conservative	T. J. Crispin	1,814		
Conservative	D. J. Fitzgerald	1,771		
Conservative	G. J. Woodman	1,740		
Labour	H. W. Welch	1,562		
Labour	Miss M. G. Brandon	1,540		
Labour	Mrs. I. M. A. Naylor	1,519		
Liberal	G. D. Smith	631		
Liberal	C. K. Beardsell	621		
Liberal	A. W. Draper	569		
Turnout		3,996	51.0	
Conservative win (new seat)				
Conservative win (new seat)				
Conservative win (new seat)				

Hounslow Central (3)
Party	Candidate	Votes	%	±%
Labour	W. E. Heighes	1,568		
Labour	F. T. Hollocks	1,559		
Labour	A. White	1,538		
Conservative	E. R. Fowles	1,397		
Conservative	R. C. Forster	1,382		
Conservative	F. G. Rayband	1,376		
Liberal	T. R. Jenkins	292		
Liberal	A. B. Smith	289		
Liberal	D. K. Overell	273		
Turnout		3,260	45.1	
Labour win (new seat)				
Labour win (new seat)				
Labour win (new seat)				

Hounslow Heath (3)
Party	Candidate	Votes	%	±%
Labour	K. A. McKay	1,626		
Labour	L. G. Sanderson	1,622		
Labour	A. J. Tinney	1,610		
Conservative	R. D. Moate	1,329		
Conservative	J. S. Thorpe	1,327		
Conservative	P. B. Gall	1,320		
Liberal	W. Stebbings	437		
Liberal	J. N. Stacey	431		
Liberal	J. H. Beasley	365		
Communist	H. C. George	78		
Turnout		3,434	44.8	
Labour win (new seat)				
Labour win (new seat)				
Labour win (new seat)				

Hounslow South (3)
Party	Candidate	Votes	%	±%
Conservative	G. J. Stephens	1,812		
Conservative	A. H. Nixon	1,787		
Conservative	A. A. Beck	1,751		
Labour	D. C. Wetzel	1,676		
Labour	Mrs. I. Hollocks	1,671		
Labour	S. L. Sage	1,647		
Liberal	M. T. James	561		
Liberal	A. B. Leah	544		
Liberal	Mrs. D. F. Stratfold	522		
Turnout		4,030	53.3	
Conservative win (new seat)				
Conservative win (new seat)				
Conservative win (new seat)				

Hounslow West (3)
Party	Candidate	Votes	%	±%
Labour	J. B. Webb	1,816		
Labour	P. H. Blake	1,783		
Labour	G. McKay	1,748		
Conservative	W. J. M. Spencer	1,571		
Conservative	F. H. P. Hobbs	1,560		
Conservative	A. F. H. Miller	1,540		
Liberal	R. J. Ludgate	397		
Liberal	H. W. J. Miles	378		
Liberal	H. Conroy	373		
Turnout		3,773	48.8	
Labour win (new seat)				
Labour win (new seat)				
Labour win (new seat)				

Isleworth North (3)
Party	Candidate	Votes	%	±%
Labour	Mrs. E. M. Coleman	2,058		
Labour	D. B. Wheatley	2,021		
Labour	M. D. Rickwood	1,995		
Conservative	N. V. Wright	1,632		
Conservative	A. G. Cross	1,626		
Conservative	R. J. Barber	1,608		
Turnout		3,697	47.6	
Labour win (new seat)				
Labour win (new seat)				
Labour win (new seat)				

Isleworth South (3)
Party	Candidate	Votes	%	±%
Labour	A. J. Fielder	1,879		
Labour	Mrs. V. G. A. Secker	1,795		
Labour	H. C. James	1,752		
Conservative	J. A. R. Walsh	904		
Conservative	R. C. Sanders	897		
Conservative	Mrs. F. M. Beck	889		
Liberal	D. F. Turner	223		
Turnout		2,905	44.9	
Labour win (new seat)				
Labour win (new seat)				
Labour win (new seat)				

Riverside (3)
Party	Candidate	Votes	%	±%
Labour	M. J. Digby	2,014		
Labour	A. E. Bearne	2,013		
Labour	Miss E. J. Atkinson	1,908		
Conservative	A. H. Bulmer	1,900		
Conservative	Mrs. L. Coates	1,844		
Conservative	M. Metford-Sewell	1,788		
Liberal	A. L. Day	784		
Turnout		4,295	53.5	
Labour win (new seat)				
Labour win (new seat)				
Labour win (new seat)				

Spring Grove (3)
Party	Candidate	Votes	%	±%
Conservative	G. A. M. Greenland	2,319		
Conservative	V. C. Denton	2,315		
Conservative	K. F. Hughes	2,311		
Labour	Mrs. M. A. Warren	634		
Labour	Mrs. R. R. Pledger	625		
Labour	J. Mott	619		
Liberal	E. G. Charrington	432		
Turnout		3,224	41.5	
Conservative win (new seat)				
Conservative win (new seat)				
Conservative win (new seat)				

Turnham Green (3)
Party	Candidate	Votes	%	±%
Labour	G. H. Sykes	1,749		
Labour	S. J. Sarkiss	1,713		
Labour	F. E. Field	1,650		
Conservative	G. E. Henniker	1,604		
Conservative	C. A. Pocock	1,592		
Conservative	L. Gainsborough	1,592		
Liberal	Mrs. C. W. Fitzgerald	370		
Communist	A. J. Shelton	203		
Turnout		3,628	45.5	
Labour win (new seat)				
Labour win (new seat)				
Labour win (new seat)				
