= 2014 Hounslow London Borough Council election =

2014 local election in England

Map of the results of the 2014 Hounslow council election. Conservatives in blue and Labour in red.

The 2014 Hounslow Council election took place on 22 May 2014 to elect members of Hounslow Borough Council in London, England. This was on the same day as other local elections.

== Results ==
Labour maintained control winning 49 seats. The Conservatives won 11 seats.

Hounslow Council election result 2014
Party	Seats	Gains	Losses	Net gain/loss	Seats %	Votes %	Votes	+/−
Labour	49	14	0	+14	81.7	43.9	35,305	+10.2
Conservative	11	0	14	-14	18.3	25.4	20,427	-5.4
UKIP	0	0	0	0	0.0	10.6	8,496	+5.7
Green	0	0	0	0	0.0	9.0	7,241	+1.0
Liberal Democrats	0	0	0	0	0.0	7.0	5,657	-5.0
Community Group	0	0	0	0	0.0	2.4	1,912	-3.1
Independent	0	0	0	0	0.0	1.4	1,164	-0.7
All People's Party	0	0	0	0	0.0	0.2	152	+0.1

== Ward Results ==
=== Bedfont ===
Bedfont (3)
Party	Candidate	Votes	%	±%
Labour	Keith Anderson	1,686	46.4	+17.7
Labour	Sachin Gupta	1,601	44.0	+13.7
Labour	Samantha Christie	1,594	43.8	+16.0
Conservative	Liz Mammatt	1,300	35.8	+6.3
Conservative	Gursh Sandhu	1,131	31.1	+3.6
Conservative	Steven Lacey	1,109	30.5	+3.7
Liberal Democrats	Jin Jhooti	442	12.2	−7.0
Green	Martin Bleach	431	11.9	N/A
Liberal Democrats	Kevin Stevens	398	10.9	−4.4
Turnout		3,636	37.5	
Labour hold		Swing		
Labour gain from Conservative		Swing		
Labour hold		Swing		

=== Brentford ===
Brentford (3)
Party	Candidate	Votes	%	±%
Labour	Ruth Cadbury	2,326	59.1	+16.0
Labour	Melvin Collins	2,066	52.5	+15.1
Labour	Myra Savin	1,875	47.6	+7.6
Conservative	Helen Roskott	733	18.6	−7.0
Conservative	Gabriella Giles	715	18.2	−7.4
Conservative	Julian Tanner	693	17.6	−5.7
Green	John Bradley	683	17.4	+7.8
UKIP	Ryan Thomas	610	15.5	N/A
Liberal Democrats	Joseph Bourke	311	7.9	−16.5
Community Group	David Cox	229	5.8	N/A
Liberal Democrats	Sean Bourke	223	5.7	−23.4
Liberal Democrats	Mona Naqvi	223	5.7	−10.9
All People's Party	Godson Azu	152	3.9	N/A
Turnout		3,936	34.6	
Labour hold		Swing		
Labour hold		Swing		
Labour hold		Swing		

=== Chiswick Homefields ===
Chiswick Homefields (3)
Party	Candidate	Votes	%	±%
Conservative	John Todd	1,758	53.5	+6.7
Conservative	Gerald McGregor	1,672	50.9	+0.4
Conservative	Robert Oulds	1,578	48.0	+3.2
Labour	Mendora Ogbogbo	1,349	41.1	+15.7
Labour	Nada Jarche	1,092	33.2	+10.7
Labour	Crispin Flintoff	797	24.3	+3.1
Liberal Democrats	Charles Rees	337	10.3	−21.9
Green	Olivia Southey	288	8.8	−9.7
Turnout		3,286	39.1	
Conservative hold		Swing		
Conservative hold		Swing		
Conservative hold		Swing		

=== Chiswick Riverside ===
Chiswick Riverside (3)
Party	Candidate	Votes	%	±%
Conservative	Sam Hearn	1,615	45.8	−1.4
Conservative	Felicity Barwood	1,572	44.6	−1.6
Conservative	Paul Lynch	1,560	44.2	−1.6
Labour	Rakib Ruhel	749	21.2	−2.4
Green	Diane Scott	688	19.5	−0.9
Labour	Gordon Sheppy	675	19.1	−0.5
Labour	Rasheed Bhatti	665	18.9	−0.4
Independent	Andy Murray	623	17.7	N/A
Green	Daniel Goldsmith	617	17.5	N/A
Green	Rachhpaul Bedi	478	13.6	N/A
UKIP	Simon Mabbutt	346	9.8	N/A
Liberal Democrats	Phyllis van der Esch	317	9.0	−26.4
Turnout		3,526	30.0	
Conservative hold		Swing		
Conservative hold		Swing		
Conservative hold		Swing		

=== Cranford ===
Cranford (3)
Party	Candidate	Votes	%	±%
Labour	Sohan Singh Sangha	2,085	60.9	+16.3
Labour	Daanish Saeed	1,813	53.0	+6.6
Labour	Gurpal Singh Virdi	1,643	48.0	+2.8
Conservative	Sarbjit Singh Gill	987	28.8	+2.5
Conservative	Del Lalli	851	24.9	−0.8
Conservative	Javaid Iqbal	801	23.4	+3.2
UKIP	Stuart Brown	508	14.8	N/A
Liberal Democrats	Ray Sekhon	235	6.9	N/A
Turnout		3,422	36.4	
Labour hold		Swing		
Labour hold		Swing		
Labour hold		Swing		

=== Feltham North ===
Feltham North (3)
Party	Candidate	Votes	%	±%
Labour	John Chatt	1,332	41.6	+7.0
Labour	Hina Mir	1,283	40.1	+7.9
Labour	Khulique Malik	1,163	36.3	+4.8
UKIP	Gill Hutchinson	1,061	33.1	−3.3
Conservative	Jarek Kalinowski	808	25.2	−27.8
Conservative	Gurbachan Singh Athwal	746	23.3	−13.7
Conservative	Abdul Majid	734	22.9	−13.5
Green	Greg Ivison	356	11.1	N/A
Liberal Democrats	Carl Pierce	301	9.4	−8.0
Turnout		3,202	37.3	
Labour gain from Conservative		Swing		
Labour gain from Conservative		Swing		
Labour gain from Conservative		Swing		

=== Feltham West ===
Feltham West (3)
Party	Candidate	Votes	%	±%
Labour	David Hughes	1,695	48.9	+10.9
Labour	Elizabeth Hughes	1,691	48.8	+15.5
Labour	Alan Mitchell	1,556	44.9	+10.6
UKIP	Colin Botterill	1,171	33.8	−6.1
Conservative	Agnieszka Lipka	861	24.8	−15.1
Conservative	Patryk Malinski	818	23.6	−13.7
Conservative	Anand Rai	718	20.7	−7.4
Turnout		3,465	32.4	
Labour gain from Conservative		Swing		
Labour hold		Swing		
Labour gain from Conservative		Swing		

=== Hanworth ===
Hanworth (3)
Party	Candidate	Votes	%	±%
Labour	Candice Atterton	1,404	48.0	+15.8
Labour	Richard Foote	1,349	46.1	+14.4
Labour	Samia Chaudhary	1,285	43.9	+17.1
UKIP	Dean Botterill	885	30.2	N/A
Conservative	Koisir Khan	550	18.8	−13.6
Conservative	Shakil Ahmed	538	18.4	−10.8
Conservative	Nanda Ratnayake	494	16.9	−12.2
Green	Steve Gough	411	14.0	+11.8
Liberal Democrats	Joan Bennett	370	12.6	−7.5
Turnout		2,927	33.9	
Labour gain from Conservative		Swing		
Labour hold		Swing		
Labour hold		Swing		

=== Hanworth Park ===
Hanworth Park (3)
Party	Candidate	Votes	%	±%
Labour	Tina Howe	1,264	37.9	+5.3
Labour	Bishnu Gurung	1,170	35.1	+9.2
Labour	Hanif Khan	1,124	33.7	+9.5
Conservative	Kath Atkinson	941	28.2	−19.3
UKIP	John Ball	934	28.0	N/A
Conservative	Paul Jabbal	921	27.6	−14.7
Conservative	Philippa Wood	890	26.7	−16.4
UKIP	Becky Stewart	885	26.6	−20.9
UKIP	Beverley Williams	832	25.0	−18.1
Liberal Democrats	Simon Martin	275	8.3	−15.2
Turnout		3,332	38.0	
Labour gain from Conservative		Swing		
Labour gain from Conservative		Swing		
Labour gain from Conservative		Swing		

=== Heston Central ===
Heston Central (3)
Party	Candidate	Votes	%	±%
Labour	Harleen Atwal Hear	2,095	60.5	+7.2
Labour	Manjit Singh Buttar	2,041	59.0	+6.6
Labour	Surinder Singh Purewal	1,951	56.4	+10.1
Conservative	Amarjit Singh Dhillon	1,018	29.4	−9.5
Conservative	Karamat Malik	968	28.0	−7.0
Conservative	Radhesham Karwal	836	24.2	−10.7
UKIP	Clive Barnes	420	12.1	N/A
Turnout		3,461	37.7	
Labour hold		Swing		
Labour hold		Swing		
Labour hold		Swing		

=== Heston East ===
Heston East (3)
Party	Candidate	Votes	%	±%
Labour	Kamaljit Kaur	2,151	67.7	+14.6
Labour	Gurmail Singh Lal	2,063	64.9	+14.5
Labour	Amrit Mann	2,037	64.1	+14.4
Conservative	Michael Kenton	766	24.1	−5.8
Conservative	Sati Bansal	720	22.7	−3.9
Conservative	Rehana Siddiqi	619	19.5	−3.6
Green	Andrew Shaw	456	14.4	+4.8
Turnout		3,177	33.6	
Labour hold		Swing		
Labour hold		Swing		
Labour hold		Swing		

=== Heston West ===
Heston West (3)
Party	Candidate	Votes	%	±%
Labour	Rajinder Bath	2,491	67.4	+12.0
Labour	Lily Bath	2,419	65.5	+16.8
Labour	Shantanu Singh Rajawat	2,323	62.9	+18.3
Conservative	Baljinder Singh Panesar	727	19.7	−10.0
Conservative	Harinder Singh Sahota	668	18.1	−10.2
Conservative	Herdeep Singh	600	16.2	−7.4
UKIP	Anne Barnes	503	13.6	N/A
Liberal Democrats	Patricia Braby	279	7.6	−7.8
Turnout		3,694	40.5	
Labour hold		Swing		
Labour hold		Swing		
Labour hold		Swing		

=== Hounslow Central ===
Hounslow Central (3)
Party	Candidate	Votes	%	±%
Labour	Pritam Singh Grewal	2,283	59.5	+10.5
Labour	Ajmer Grewal	2,224	58.0	+7.6
Labour	Nisar Malik	2,088	54.4	+0.6
Conservative	Christine Quick	997	26.0	−2.0
Conservative	Maneesh Singh	873	22.8	−9.1
Conservative	Rag Tangri	724	18.9	−7.7
Green	Tom Beaton	522	13.6	+2.6
UKIP	Barry Reed	429	11.2	N/A
Liberal Democrats	Margaret Cave	420	10.9	−10.6
Turnout		3,837	33.2	
Labour hold		Swing		
Labour hold		Swing		
Labour hold		Swing		

=== Hounslow Heath ===
Hounslow Heath (3)
Party	Candidate	Votes	%	±%
Labour	Colin Ellar	2,331	65.6	+18.5
Labour	Mukesh Malhotra	2,238	63.0	+16.4
Labour	Corinna Smart	2,177	61.3	+21.5
Conservative	Bela Gallagher	770	21.7	−3.0
Conservative	Patrick Cusworth	739	20.8	−2.0
Conservative	Peter Vanstone	696	19.6	−2.7
Green	Stefan Wills	390	11.0	N/A
Liberal Democrats	Sally Billenness	322	9.1	−14.6
Liberal Democrats	Mark Billenness	271	7.6	N/A
Turnout		3,552	33.8	
Labour hold		Swing		
Labour hold		Swing		
Labour hold		Swing		

=== Hounslow South ===
Hounslow South (3)
Party	Candidate	Votes	%	±%
Labour	Tom Bruce	1,980	50.1	+13.7
Labour	Bob Whatley	1,830	46.3	+10.4
Labour	Shaida Mehrban	1,747	44.2	+9.6
Conservative	Lin Davies	1,283	32.5	−6.9
Conservative	Brad Fisher	1,275	32.3	−5.1
Conservative	Pam Fisher	1,194	30.2	−8.0
UKIP	Kevin Cronin	633	16.0	N/A
Green	Anthony Agius	516	13.1	+0.1
Liberal Democrats	Syed Ali	321	8.1	N/A
Turnout		3,950	44.4	
Labour gain from Conservative		Swing		
Labour gain from Conservative		Swing		
Labour gain from Conservative		Swing		

=== Hounslow West ===
Hounslow West (3)
Party	Candidate	Votes	%	±%
Labour	Jagdish Sharma	2,262	61.7	+8.9
Labour	Puneet Grewal	2,160	58.9	+4.5
Labour	Bandna Chopra	2,081	56.7	+12.9
Conservative	Saad Ahmad	803	21.9	−6.3
Conservative	Jagir Singh Sandhu	700	19.1	−8.5
Conservative	Mandip Singh Thind	658	17.9	−6.8
Independent	Ajmer Singh Dhillon	491	13.4	−41.0
Green	Alexander Vougioukas	359	9.8	+0.6
Liberal Democrats	Robina Howliston	284	7.7	−10.9
Independent	Bill Gallup	244	6.7	N/A
Turnout		3,668	37.6	
Labour hold		Swing		
Labour hold		Swing		
Labour hold		Swing		

=== Isleworth ===
Isleworth (3)
Party	Candidate	Votes	%	±%
Labour	Lynn Green	1,601	45.4	+9.6
Labour	Ed Mayne	1,492	42.4	+7.6
Labour	Sue Sampson	1,491	42.3	+5.7
Community Group	Philip Andrews	746	21.2	−12.1
Community Group	Patricia Doran	684	19.4	−5.7
Community Group	Paul Fisher	658	18.7	−10.6
Conservative	Fadi Farhat	595	16.9	−8.4
Conservative	Sana Jarche	526	14.9	−9.2
Conservative	Mohamad Jarche	507	14.4	−4.6
UKIP	Kelly Adams	447	12.7	N/A
UKIP	Melanie Flynn	374	10.6	N/A
UKIP	Sharon Smith	356	10.1	N/A
Green	John Ferris	350	9.9	−3.4
Liberal Democrats	Sheena Bourke	194	5.5	N/A
Independent	David Griffiths	50	1.4	N/A
Turnout		3,523	39.7	
Labour hold		Swing		
Labour hold		Swing		
Labour hold		Swing		

=== Osterley & Spring Grove ===
Osterley & Spring Grove (3)
Party	Candidate	Votes	%	±%
Labour	Antony Louki	1,632	44.3	+10.1
Conservative	Sheila O'Reilly	1,596	43.3	+0.1
Conservative	Peter Carey	1,588	43.1	+1.7
Labour	Unsa Chaudri	1,536	41.7	+9.4
Labour	Stephen McEvoy	1,506	40.9	+10.0
Conservative	Ajoy Gosain	1,345	36.5	−2.9
Green	Maggie Winkworth	604	16.4	+3.5
Liberal Democrats	John James	438	11.9	−11.5
Turnout		3,683	36.6	
Labour gain from Conservative		Swing		
Conservative hold		Swing		
Conservative hold		Swing		

=== Syon ===
Syon (3)
Party	Candidate	Votes	%	±%
Labour	Steve Curran	1,686	44.0	+8.9
Labour	Katherine Dunne	1,673	43.7	+13.2
Labour	Theo Dennison	1,615	42.2	+8.6
Community Group	Caroline Andrews	937	24.4	−0.8
Community Group	Shirley Fisher	811	21.2	−2.0
Community Group	Ian Speed	742	19.4	−5.1
Conservative	David Gerrey	732	19.1	−6.2
Conservative	Ron Muschiso	617	16.1	−7.2
Conservative	Ranjit Gill	606	15.8	−5.1
UKIP	Paul Motion	549	14.3	+7.2
Green	Tony Firkins	487	12.7	+0.5
Liberal Democrats	Joan Brown	291	7.6	N/A
Turnout		3,829	37.5	
Labour hold		Swing		
Labour hold		Swing		
Labour hold		Swing		

=== Turnham Green ===
Turnham Green (3)
Party	Candidate	Votes	%	±%
Conservative	Samantha Davies	1,587	52.3	+3.7
Conservative	Peter Thompson	1,517	50.0	+4.2
Conservative	Adrian Lee	1,402	46.2	+0.3
Labour	Andrew Lewin	903	29.8	+6.1
Labour	David McLoughlin	881	29.1	+4.1
Labour	Peter Nathan	791	26.1	+6.6
Green	Sean Gibbons	700	23.1	+3.1
Liberal Democrats	William Gewanter	520	17.2	−17.7
Turnout		3,032	35.3	
Conservative hold		Swing		
Conservative hold		Swing		
Conservative hold		Swing		
