= 2018 Hounslow London Borough Council election =

English local election

2018 Hounslow Borough Council election
- 3 May 2018

All 60 seats to Hounslow London Borough Council 31 seats needed for a majority

| | First party | Second party |
|---|---|---|
| Party | Labour | Conservative |
| Last election | 49 seats, 52.7% | 11 seats, 30.2% |
| Seats won | 51 | 9 |
| Seat change | ▲2 | ▼2 |
| Popular vote | 107,713 | 57,285 |
| Percentage | 54.1% | 28.8% |
| Swing | ▲1.4% | ▼1.4% |
- Map of the results of the 2018 Hounslow council election. Labour in red and Conservatives in blue.
Council control before election
Labour
Council control after election
Labour

The 2018 Hounslow Council election took place on 3 May 2018 to elect members of Hounslow Borough Council in London, England. This was on the same day as other local elections. The Labour Party increased their majority on the council by gaining two seats from the Conservatives.

== Result summary ==
Hounslow Council election result 2018
| Party | Seats | Gains | Losses | Net gain/loss | Seats % | Votes % | Votes | +/− |
|---|---|---|---|---|---|---|---|---|
| Labour | 51 | 2 | 0 | +2 | 85.0 | 54.1 | 107,713 | +1.4 |
| Conservative | 9 | 0 | 2 | -2 | 15.0 | 28.8 | 57,285 | -1.4 |
| Liberal Democrats | 0 | 0 | 0 | 0 | 0.0 | 8.1 | 16,123 | +4.5 |
| Green | 0 | 0 | 0 | 0 | 0.0 | 7.8 | 15,599 | +3.4 |
| Independent | 0 | 0 | 0 | 0 | 0.0 | 0.8 | 1,658 | +0.1 |
| Duma Polska | 0 | 0 | 0 | 0 | 0.0 | 0.3 | 559 | New |
| Renew | 0 | 0 | 0 | 0 | 0.0 | 0.1 | 153 | New |
| TUSC | 0 | 0 | 0 | 0 | 0.0 | 0.1 | 139 | New |

== Detailed Results ==
=== Bedfont ===
Bedfont (3)
| Party | Candidate | Votes | % | ±% |
|---|---|---|---|---|
| Labour | Adriana Gheorghe | 1,656 | 48.7 | +2.3 |
| Labour | Javed Akhunzada | 1,649 | 48.5 | +4.5 |
| Labour | Raghwinder Siddhu | 1,623 | 47.7 | +3.9 |
| Conservative | Peter Edwards | 1,321 | 38.8 | +7.7 |
| Conservative | Liz Mammatt | 1,291 | 38.0 | +2.2 |
| Conservative | John Osborn | 1,258 | 37.0 | +6.5 |
| Green | Luke O'Gorman | 212 | 6.2 | −5.7 |
| Liberal Democrats | Paul Moran | 197 | 5.8 | −6.4 |
| Liberal Democrats | Ramnik Jhooti | 171 | 5.0 | −5.9 |
| Green | Olivia Cannakamma | 143 | 4.2 | N/A |
| Liberal Democrats | Arben Kastrati | 110 | 3.2 | N/A |
| Green | Chantel Wetzel | 110 | 3.2 | N/A |
| Turnout | | | | |
| Labour hold | | Swing | | |
| Labour hold | | Swing | | |
| Labour hold | | Swing | | |

=== Brentford ===
Brentford (3)
| Party | Candidate | Votes | % | ±% |
|---|---|---|---|---|
| Labour | Melvin Collins | 2,319 | 57.7 | +5.2 |
| Labour | Edwin Lambert | 2,241 | 55.7 | −3.4 |
| Labour | Corinna Smart | 2,118 | 52.7 | +5.1 |
| Conservative | Christian Giovannini | 921 | 22.9 | +4.3 |
| Conservative | Alexander Gewanter | 857 | 21.3 | +3.1 |
| Green | Victoria George | 811 | 20.2 | +2.8 |
| Conservative | Kinsuk Mitra-Thakur | 789 | 19.6 | +2.0 |
| Green | Thomas Beaton | 573 | 14.2 | N/A |
| Green | John Firkins | 570 | 14.2 | N/A |
| Independent | Torron-Lee Dewar | 250 | 6.2 | N/A |
| Turnout | | | | |
| Labour hold | | Swing | | |
| Labour hold | | Swing | | |
| Labour hold | | Swing | | |

=== Chiswick Homefields ===
Chiswick Homefields (3)
| Party | Candidate | Votes | % | ±% |
|---|---|---|---|---|
| Conservative | John Todd | 1,737 | 45.2 | −8.3 |
| Conservative | Gerald McGregor | 1,663 | 43.3 | −7.6 |
| Conservative | Patrick Barr | 1,621 | 42.2 | −5.8 |
| Labour | Nicholas Fitzpatrick | 1,264 | 32.9 | −8.2 |
| Labour | Caoimhe Hale | 1,233 | 32.1 | −1.1 |
| Labour | David Waller | 1,067 | 27.8 | +3.5 |
| Liberal Democrats | Alice Bailhache | 625 | 16.3 | N/A |
| Liberal Democrats | Charles Rees | 570 | 14.8 | +4.5 |
| Liberal Democrats | Alex Fox | 476 | 12.4 | N/A |
| Green | Martin Bleach | 285 | 7.4 | −1.4 |
| Green | Nicole Ruduss | 270 | 7.0 | N/A |
| Green | Maggie Winkworth | 251 | 6.5 | N/A |
| Renew | Iain Howell | 153 | 4.0 | N/A |
| Turnout | | | | |
| Conservative hold | | Swing | | |
| Conservative hold | | Swing | | |
| Conservative hold | | Swing | | |

=== Chiswick Riverside ===
Chiswick Riverside (3)
| Party | Candidate | Votes | % | ±% |
|---|---|---|---|---|
| Conservative | Sam Hearn | 1,707 | 43.6 | −2.2 |
| Conservative | Michael Denniss | 1,702 | 43.5 | −1.1 |
| Conservative | Gabriella Giles | 1,690 | 43.2 | −1.0 |
| Labour | Sally Malin | 1,381 | 35.3 | +16.2 |
| Labour | Tom White | 1,200 | 30.7 | +11.8 |
| Labour | Rakib Ruhel | 1,184 | 30.2 | +9.0 |
| Liberal Democrats | Francis Beddington | 583 | 14.9 | +5.9 |
| Liberal Democrats | Guy De Boursac | 482 | 12.3 | N/A |
| Liberal Democrats | James McConnell | 431 | 11.0 | N/A |
| Green | Elisabeth Forrester | 423 | 10.8 | −8.7 |
| Green | Fay Miller | 306 | 7.8 | −5.8 |
| Green | Daniel Goldsmith | 294 | 7.5 | −10.0 |
| Duma Polska | Maria Kempinska | 76 | 1.9 | N/A |
| Turnout | | | | |
| Conservative hold | | Swing | | |
| Conservative hold | | Swing | | |
| Conservative hold | | Swing | | |

=== Cranford ===
Cranford (3)
| Party | Candidate | Votes | % | ±% |
|---|---|---|---|---|
| Labour | Sukhbir Dhaliwal | 2,113 | 64.2 | +3.3 |
| Labour | Poonam Dhillon | 2,039 | 62.0 | +9.0 |
| Labour | Khulique Malik | 1,853 | 56.3 | +8.3 |
| Conservative | Sukhdev Maras | 784 | 23.8 | −5.0 |
| Conservative | Eileen Newton | 651 | 19.8 | −5.1 |
| Conservative | Renu Raj | 624 | 19.0 | −4.4 |
| Liberal Democrats | Iman Malik | 180 | 5.5 | −1.4 |
| Liberal Democrats | Sangam Gul | 163 | 5.0 | N/A |
| Green | Jon Elkon | 141 | 4.3 | N/A |
| Green | Freya Summersgill | 135 | 4.1 | N/A |
| Green | Jack Ridley | 132 | 4.0 | N/A |
| Liberal Democrats | Deborah Owoade | 123 | 3.7 | N/A |
| Turnout | | | | |
| Labour hold | | Swing | | |
| Labour hold | | Swing | | |
| Labour hold | | Swing | | |

=== Feltham North ===
Feltham North (3)
| Party | Candidate | Votes | % | ±% |
|---|---|---|---|---|
| Labour | John Chatt | 1,463 | 48.8 | +7.2 |
| Labour | Aqsa Ahmed | 1,399 | 46.6 | +6.5 |
| Labour | Komal Chaudri | 1,321 | 44.0 | +7.7 |
| Conservative | Martin Gallagher | 888 | 29.6 | +4.4 |
| Conservative | Anand Rai | 838 | 27.9 | +4.6 |
| Conservative | Zilfiqar Ali | 765 | 25.5 | +2.6 |
| Independent | Ian Stewart | 425 | 14.2 | N/A |
| Independent | June Stewart | 380 | 12.7 | N/A |
| Liberal Democrats | Jack Moran | 283 | 9.4 | ±0.0 |
| Green | Leah Hammocks | 266 | 8.9 | −2.2 |
| Green | Anthony Agius | 180 | 6.0 | N/A |
| Liberal Democrats | Naomi Stoney | 150 | 5.0 | N/A |
| Green | Elly Lewis-Holmes | 128 | 4.3 | N/A |
| Turnout | | | | |
| Labour hold | | Swing | | |
| Labour hold | | Swing | | |
| Labour hold | | Swing | | |

=== Feltham West ===
Feltham West (3)
| Party | Candidate | Votes | % | ±% |
|---|---|---|---|---|
| Labour | Alan Mitchell | 1,856 | 56.2 | +11.3 |
| Labour | Hina Mir | 1,662 | 50.3 | +1.4 |
| Labour | Mohammed Umair | 1,444 | 43.7 | −5.1 |
| Conservative | Don Lowe | 793 | 24.0 | −0.8 |
| Conservative | Vesna Cvetek | 748 | 22.7 | −0.9 |
| Conservative | Koisor Khan | 677 | 20.5 | −0.2 |
| Independent | Garvin Sneil | 479 | 14.5 | N/A |
| Green | Stephen Barber | 363 | 11.0 | N/A |
| Green | Timothy Harris | 332 | 10.1 | N/A |
| Liberal Democrats | Cameron Caine | 300 | 9.1 | N/A |
| Green | Sylvia Osterreicher | 238 | 7.2 | N/A |
| Liberal Democrats | Tayyaba Khan | 171 | 5.2 | N/A |
| Turnout | | | | |
| Labour hold | | Swing | | |
| Labour hold | | Swing | | |
| Labour hold | | Swing | | |

=== Hanworth ===
Hanworth (3)
| Party | Candidate | Votes | % | ±% |
|---|---|---|---|---|
| Labour | Candice Atterton | 1,525 | 50.7 | +2.7 |
| Labour | Samia Chaudhary | 1,426 | 47.4 | +3.5 |
| Labour | Richard Foote | 1,395 | 46.4 | +0.3 |
| Conservative | Nirmala Madadi | 993 | 33.0 | +14.2 |
| Conservative | Jayawardana Pathiranage | 851 | 28.3 | +9.9 |
| Conservative | Ran Maliyadde | 813 | 27.0 | +10.1 |
| Liberal Democrats | Edward Wilson | 299 | 9.9 | −2.7 |
| Green | Craig Holmes | 255 | 8.5 | −5.5 |
| Green | Karl Brinkley | 252 | 8.4 | N/A |
| Liberal Democrats | Carl Moran | 236 | 7.9 | N/A |
| Liberal Democrats | Hamid Chaker | 209 | 7.0 | N/A |
| Green | Donna McKeown | 171 | 5.7 | N/A |
| Turnout | | | | |
| Labour hold | | Swing | | |
| Labour hold | | Swing | | |
| Labour hold | | Swing | | |

=== Hanworth Park ===
Hanworth Park (3)
| Party | Candidate | Votes | % | ±% |
|---|---|---|---|---|
| Labour | Bishnu Gurung | 1,315 | 40.7 | +5.6 |
| Labour | Puneet Grewal | 1,284 | 39.8 | +1.9 |
| Labour | Hanif Khan | 1,189 | 36.8 | +3.1 |
| Conservative | Sukhbinder Bahia | 1,003 | 31.1 | +2.9 |
| Conservative | Parmod Kad | 961 | 29.8 | +2.2 |
| Conservative | Kuldeep Tak | 895 | 27.7 | +1.0 |
| Liberal Democrats | Richard Clarke | 819 | 25.4 | +17.1 |
| Liberal Democrats | Nitgar Ali | 424 | 13.1 | N/A |
| Liberal Democrats | Daljit Randhawa | 357 | 11.1 | N/A |
| Green | Barry Dunn-Sims | 355 | 11.0 | N/A |
| Green | Naomi Landy | 306 | 9.5 | N/A |
| Green | John Gough | 240 | 7.4 | N/A |
| Turnout | | | | |
| Labour hold | | Swing | | |
| Labour hold | | Swing | | |
| Labour hold | | Swing | | |

=== Heston Central ===
Heston Central (3)
| Party | Candidate | Votes | % | ±% |
|---|---|---|---|---|
| Labour | Harleen Hear | 2,044 | 66.5 | +6.0 |
| Labour | Surinder Purewal | 1,889 | 61.5 | +5.1 |
| Labour | Shivraj Grewal | 1,873 | 61.0 | +2.0 |
| Conservative | Ian May | 681 | 22.2 | −7.2 |
| Conservative | Harpreet Boparai | 671 | 21.8 | −6.2 |
| Conservative | Muraad Chaudhry | 647 | 21.1 | −3.1 |
| Green | Heather Broadbridge | 209 | 6.8 | N/A |
| Liberal Democrats | Duncan Buchanan | 187 | 6.1 | N/A |
| Green | Sergejs Adamovs | 182 | 5.9 | N/A |
| Liberal Democrats | Parmail Kaur | 147 | 4.8 | N/A |
| Green | Benjamin Ginsborg | 146 | 4.8 | N/A |
| Turnout | | | | |
| Labour hold | | Swing | | |
| Labour hold | | Swing | | |
| Labour hold | | Swing | | |

=== Heston East ===
Heston East (3)
| Party | Candidate | Votes | % | ±% |
|---|---|---|---|---|
| Labour | Kamaljit Johal | 1,952 | 65.3 | −2.4 |
| Labour | Gurmail Lal | 1,916 | 64.1 | −0.8 |
| Labour | Amritpal Maan | 1,879 | 62.9 | −1.2 |
| Conservative | Michael Kenton | 613 | 20.5 | −3.6 |
| Conservative | Narinder Grewal | 602 | 20.1 | −2.6 |
| Conservative | Vaibhav Mistry | 522 | 17.5 | −2.0 |
| Green | Jennifer Firkins | 286 | 9.6 | −4.8 |
| Green | Philip Clarke | 225 | 7.5 | N/A |
| Green | Dave Wetzel | 188 | 6.3 | N/A |
| Liberal Democrats | Zohaib Shan | 147 | 4.9 | N/A |
| Turnout | | | | |
| Labour hold | | Swing | | |
| Labour hold | | Swing | | |
| Labour hold | | Swing | | |

=== Heston West ===
Heston West (3)
| Party | Candidate | Votes | % | ±% |
|---|---|---|---|---|
| Labour | Rajinder Bath | 2,408 | 73.1 | +5.7 |
| Labour | Lily Bath | 2,311 | 70.2 | +4.7 |
| Labour | Shantanu Rajawat | 2,110 | 64.1 | +1.2 |
| Conservative | Madeleine Dalgleish | 513 | 15.6 | −4.1 |
| Conservative | Vishal-Karna Kumar | 487 | 14.8 | −3.3 |
| Conservative | Ank Raj | 484 | 14.7 | −1.5 |
| Liberal Democrats | Satnam Khalsa | 264 | 8.0 | +0.4 |
| Liberal Democrats | Aniq Nawaz | 185 | 5.6 | N/A |
| Green | Hannah Murray | 176 | 5.3 | N/A |
| Green | Xaviera Black | 154 | 4.7 | N/A |
| Green | Adam Hagerty | 146 | 4.4 | N/A |
| Turnout | | | | |
| Labour hold | | Swing | | |
| Labour hold | | Swing | | |
| Labour hold | | Swing | | |

=== Hounslow Central ===
Hounslow Central (3)
| Party | Candidate | Votes | % | ±% |
|---|---|---|---|---|
| Labour | Pritam Grewal | 2,402 | 62.6 | +3.1 |
| Labour | Ajmer Grewal | 2,392 | 62.3 | +4.3 |
| Labour | Nisar Malik | 2,211 | 57.6 | +3.2 |
| Conservative | Prasanna Kannan | 804 | 20.9 | −5.1 |
| Conservative | Serena Lit | 793 | 20.7 | −2.1 |
| Conservative | Vrajeshkumar Pandya | 697 | 18.2 | −0.7 |
| Green | Mary-Ellen Archer | 387 | 10.1 | −3.5 |
| Liberal Democrats | Marcelle Von Wendland | 270 | 7.0 | −3.9 |
| Green | Katie Wilmot | 259 | 6.7 | N/A |
| Green | Ann Thomas | 228 | 5.9 | N/A |
| Duma Polska | Krzysztof Giza | 168 | 4.4 | N/A |
| Duma Polska | Zbigniew Adamczyk | 163 | 4.2 | N/A |
| Duma Polska | Malwina Kukaj | 152 | 4.0 | N/A |
| TUSC | John Viner | 81 | 2.1 | N/A |
| Turnout | | | | |
| Labour hold | | Swing | | |
| Labour hold | | Swing | | |
| Labour hold | | Swing | | |

=== Hounslow Heath ===
Hounslow Heath (3)
| Party | Candidate | Votes | % | ±% |
|---|---|---|---|---|
| Labour | Vickram Grewal | 2,421 | 63.3 | −2.3 |
| Labour | Hina Kiani | 2,308 | 60.3 | −2.7 |
| Labour | Afzaal Kiani | 2,298 | 60.0 | −1.3 |
| Conservative | Anabela Gallagher | 749 | 19.6 | −2.1 |
| Conservative | David Gerrey | 705 | 18.4 | −2.4 |
| Conservative | Peter Vanstone | 588 | 15.4 | −4.2 |
| Green | John Friend | 351 | 9.2 | −1.8 |
| Liberal Democrats | Hina Malik | 318 | 8.3 | N/A |
| Liberal Democrats | Sally Billenness | 314 | 8.2 | −0.9 |
| Liberal Democrats | Mark Billenness | 293 | 7.7 | +0.1 |
| Green | Britta Goodman | 259 | 6.8 | N/A |
| Green | John Hanniffy | 200 | 5.2 | N/A |
| Turnout | | | | |
| Labour hold | | Swing | | |
| Labour hold | | Swing | | |
| Labour hold | | Swing | | |

=== Hounslow South ===
Hounslow South (3)
| Party | Candidate | Votes | % | ±% |
|---|---|---|---|---|
| Labour | Thomas Bruce | 2,175 | 58.7 | +8.6 |
| Labour | Karen Smith | 1,926 | 52.0 | +5.7 |
| Labour | Shaida Mehrban | 1,784 | 48.2 | +4.0 |
| Conservative | Bernadette Mitra-Thakur | 1,107 | 29.9 | −2.6 |
| Conservative | Sana Jarche | 1,084 | 29.3 | −3.0 |
| Conservative | Mohamad Jarche | 1,045 | 28.2 | −2.0 |
| Green | Simon Davenport | 421 | 11.4 | −1.7 |
| Liberal Democrats | Syed Ali | 350 | 9.5 | +1.4 |
| Green | Jessica Spiring | 339 | 9.2 | N/A |
| Green | Pawan Hannadige | 255 | 6.9 | N/A |
| TUSC | Sukhmani Sethi | 58 | 1.6 | N/A |
| Turnout | | | | |
| Labour hold | | Swing | | |
| Labour hold | | Swing | | |
| Labour hold | | Swing | | |

=== Hounslow West ===
Hounslow West (3)
| Party | Candidate | Votes | % | ±% |
|---|---|---|---|---|
| Labour | Bandna Chopra | 2,206 | 63.7 | +7.0 |
| Labour | Jagdish Sharma | 2,188 | 63.2 | +1.5 |
| Labour | Sohan Samra | 2,025 | 58.5 | −0.4 |
| Conservative | Hareshkumar Bhalsod | 788 | 22.8 | +0.9 |
| Conservative | Sandra Cullinane | 717 | 20.7 | +1.6 |
| Conservative | Adamya Raj | 679 | 19.6 | +1.7 |
| Green | Caroline Bridgman | 282 | 8.1 | −1.7 |
| Green | Mariette Labelle | 209 | 6.0 | N/A |
| Liberal Democrats | Carl Pierce | 205 | 5.9 | −1.8 |
| Liberal Democrats | Nital Doshi | 186 | 5.4 | N/A |
| Liberal Democrats | Simon Rowland | 184 | 5.3 | N/A |
| Green | David Juritz | 176 | 5.1 | N/A |
| Turnout | | | | |
| Labour hold | | Swing | | |
| Labour hold | | Swing | | |
| Labour hold | | Swing | | |

=== Isleworth ===
Isleworth (3)
| Party | Candidate | Votes | % | ±% |
|---|---|---|---|---|
| Labour | Susan Lockyer | 1,919 | 54.5 | +9.1 |
| Labour | Salman Shaheen | 1,710 | 48.6 | +6.2 |
| Labour | Daanish Saeed | 1,674 | 47.6 | +5.3 |
| Conservative | May Jarche | 812 | 23.1 | +7.4 |
| Conservative | Chandra Alapati | 789 | 22.4 | +5.5 |
| Conservative | Nada Jarche | 750 | 21.3 | +6.9 |
| Liberal Democrats | Robert Thorpe | 570 | 16.2 | +10.7 |
| Liberal Democrats | Joseph Bourke | 495 | 14.1 | N/A |
| Liberal Democrats | Henna Asghar | 483 | 13.7 | N/A |
| Green | Lisa Warren | 357 | 10.2 | N/A |
| Green | Andrew Hatton | 198 | 5.6 | N/A |
| Green | John Ferris | 195 | 5.5 | −4.4 |
| Independent | David Griffiths | 124 | 3.5 | +2.1 |
| Turnout | | | | |
| Labour hold | | Swing | | |
| Labour hold | | Swing | | |
| Labour hold | | Swing | | |

=== Osterley & Spring Grove ===
Osterley & Spring Grove (3)
| Party | Candidate | Votes | % | ±% |
|---|---|---|---|---|
| Labour | Antony Louki | 2,201 | 56.7 | +12.4 |
| Labour | Richard Eason | 1,971 | 50.7 | +9.8 |
| Labour | Unsa Chaudri | 1,904 | 49.0 | +7.3 |
| Conservative | Sheila O'Reilly | 1,420 | 36.6 | −6.7 |
| Conservative | Cynthia Torto | 1,166 | 30.0 | −13.1 |
| Conservative | Maneesh Singh | 1,154 | 29.7 | −6.8 |
| Liberal Democrats | John James | 306 | 7.9 | −4.0 |
| Green | Emilia Grassi | 272 | 7.0 | −9.4 |
| Green | Luke Scott | 217 | 5.6 | N/A |
| Green | Andrew Smart | 213 | 5.5 | N/A |
| Liberal Democrats | Desmond Bourke | 204 | 5.3 | N/A |
| Liberal Democrats | Sean Bourke | 177 | 4.6 | N/A |
| Turnout | | | | |
| Labour hold | | Swing | | |
| Labour gain from Conservative | | Swing | | |
| Labour gain from Conservative | | Swing | | |

=== Syon ===
Syon (3)
| Party | Candidate | Votes | % | ±% |
|---|---|---|---|---|
| Labour | Stephen Curran | 1,963 | 50.9 | +6.9 |
| Labour | Katherine Dunne | 1,950 | 50.6 | +6.9 |
| Labour | Theo Dennison | 1,829 | 47.5 | +5.3 |
| Conservative | Robert Oulds | 1,024 | 26.6 | +7.5 |
| Conservative | Ryan Harrild | 994 | 25.8 | +9.7 |
| Conservative | Satvinder Buttar | 927 | 24.1 | +8.3 |
| Green | Fiona McIver-Wilson | 492 | 12.8 | +0.1 |
| Green | Andrea Black | 479 | 12.4 | N/A |
| Liberal Democrats | Jack Ballentyne | 446 | 11.6 | +4.0 |
| Liberal Democrats | Phyllis Van Der Esch | 375 | 9.7 | N/A |
| Green | Stefan Wells | 356 | 9.2 | N/A |
| Liberal Democrats | Steven Parker | 328 | 8.5 | N/A |
| Turnout | | | | |
| Labour hold | | Swing | | |
| Labour hold | | Swing | | |
| Labour hold | | Swing | | |

=== Turnham Green ===
Turnham Green (3)
| Party | Candidate | Votes | % | ±% |
|---|---|---|---|---|
| Conservative | Joanna Biddolph | 1,612 | 44.6 | −7.7 |
| Conservative | Ronald Mushiso | 1,426 | 39.5 | −10.5 |
| Conservative | Pendhar Gill | 1,394 | 38.6 | −7.6 |
| Labour | Peter Burgess | 1,252 | 34.7 | +4.9 |
| Labour | Ruth Mayorcas | 1,250 | 34.6 | +5.5 |
| Labour | John Stroud-Turp | 1,153 | 31.9 | +5.8 |
| Liberal Democrats | Helen Cross | 859 | 23.8 | +6.6 |
| Liberal Democrats | Leigh Edwards | 738 | 20.4 | N/A |
| Liberal Democrats | Christopher Gillie | 733 | 20.3 | N/A |
| Turnout | | | | |
| Conservative hold | | Swing | | |
| Conservative hold | | Swing | | |
| Conservative hold | | Swing | | |

== By-elections ==
=== Cranford ===
Cranford: 6 May 2021
| Party | Candidate | Votes | % | ±% |
|---|---|---|---|---|
| Labour | Devina Ram | 2,129 | 52.0 | −13.7 |
| Conservative | Shabnam Nasimi | 1,191 | 29.1 | +4.7 |
| Independent | Gurpal Virdi | 355 | 8.7 | N/A |
| Green | Martin Bleach | 284 | 6.9 | +2.5 |
| Liberal Democrats | Sangam Gul | 133 | 3.3 | +2.3 |
| Majority | | 938 | 22.9 | |
| Turnout | | 4,092 | | |
| Labour hold | | Swing | ▼9.2 | |

=== Hounslow Heath ===
Hounslow Heath: 6 May 2021
| Party | Candidate | Votes | % | ±% |
|---|---|---|---|---|
| Labour | Madeeha Asim | 2,179 | 52.0 | −11.1 |
| Conservative | Nadia Jarche | 1,150 | 27.4 | +7.9 |
| Liberal Democrats | Sally Billenness | 386 | 9.2 | +0.9 |
| Green | Britta Goodman | 322 | 7.7 | −1.4 |
| TUSC | Sukhmani Sethi | 154 | 3.7 | N/A |
| Majority | | 1,029 | 24.6 | |
| Turnout | | 4,191 | | |
| Labour hold | | Swing | ▼9.5 | |
