= 2010 Hounslow London Borough Council election =

2010 local election in England

Map of the results of the 2010 Hounslow council election. Conservatives in blue and Labour in red.

Elections for Hounslow Borough Council in London were held on 6 May 2010. The 2010 United Kingdom General Election and other local elections took place on the same day.

In London council elections the entire council is elected every four years, as opposed to some local elections where one councillor is elected every year in three of the four years.

== Results ==
Hounslow Council election result 2010
| Party | Seats | Gains | Losses | Net gain/loss | Seats % | Votes % | Votes | +/− |
|---|---|---|---|---|---|---|---|---|
| Labour | 35 | 11 | 0 | +11 | | | | |
| Conservative | 25 | 2 | 0 | +2 | | | | |
| Liberal Democrats | 0 | 0 | 5 | -5 | | | | |
| Residents | 0 | 0 | 6 | -6 | | | | |
| Independent | 0 | 0 | 2 | -2 | | | | |

== Ward Results ==
=== Bedfont ===
Bedfont (3)
| Party | Candidate | Votes | % | ±% |
|---|---|---|---|---|
| Labour | Sachin Gupta | 1,538 | 30.3 | |
| Conservative | Liz Mammatt | 1,498 | 29.5 | |
| Labour | Tom Bruce | 1,460 | 28.7 | |
| Labour | Cliffe Morgan | 1,414 | 27.8 | |
| Conservative | Bernard Pruden | 1,399 | 27.5 | |
| Conservative | Rodrigo Sanchez | 1,364 | 26.8 | |
| Liberal Democrats | Jin Jhooti | 976 | 19.2 | |
| Hounslow Independent Alliance | Peter Hills | 811 | 16.0 | |
| Liberal Democrats | Pat Braby | 780 | 15.3 | |
| Liberal Democrats | Reeten Banerji | 756 | 14.9 | |
| Hounslow Independent Alliance | Alex Beumer | 689 | 13.6 | |
| Hounslow Independent Alliance | Maggie Goodwin | 636 | 12.5 | |
| BNP | Richard Meier | 589 | 11.6 | |
| Turnout | | 5,082 | 58.3 | |
| Labour gain from Liberal Democrats | | Swing | | |
| Conservative gain from Hounslow Independent Alliance | | Swing | | |
| Labour hold | | Swing | | |

=== Brentford ===
Brentford (3)
| Party | Candidate | Votes | % | ±% |
|---|---|---|---|---|
| Labour | Ruth Cadbury | 2,466 | 43.1 | |
| Labour | Matt Harmer | 2,287 | 40.0 | |
| Labour | Mel Collins | 2,141 | 37.4 | |
| Liberal Democrats | Andrew Dakers | 1,663 | 29.1 | |
| Conservative | Tracey Bleakley | 1,466 | 25.6 | |
| Conservative | Nicky Dykes | 1,466 | 25.6 | |
| Liberal Democrats | Joseph Bourke | 1,394 | 24.4 | |
| Conservative | Colin Ford | 1,332 | 23.3 | |
| Liberal Democrats | Mona Naqvi | 947 | 16.6 | |
| Green | Tony Firkins | 547 | 9.6 | |
| Turnout | | 5,719 | 56.8 | |
| Labour hold | | Swing | | |
| Labour hold | | Swing | | |
| Labour gain from Liberal Democrats | | Swing | | |

=== Chiswick Homefields ===
Chiswick Homefields (3)
| Party | Candidate | Votes | % | ±% |
|---|---|---|---|---|
| Conservative | Gerald McGregor | 2,920 | 50.5 | |
| Conservative | John Todd | 2,704 | 46.8 | |
| Conservative | Robert Oulds | 2,591 | 44.8 | |
| Liberal Democrats | Julie Thomas | 1,864 | 32.2 | |
| Labour | Ann Glennerster | 1,466 | 25.4 | |
| Labour | David Hopper | 1,301 | 22.5 | |
| Labour | Anita Soley | 1,224 | 21.2 | |
| Green | Martin Bleach | 1,071 | 18.5 | |
| CPA | Evangeline Pillai | 132 | 2.3 | |
| Turnout | | 5,781 | 68.6 | |
| Conservative hold | | Swing | | |
| Conservative hold | | Swing | | |
| Conservative hold | | Swing | | |

=== Chiswick Riverside ===
Chiswick Riverside (3)
| Party | Candidate | Votes | % | ±% |
|---|---|---|---|---|
| Conservative | Sam Hearn | 2,756 | 47.2 | |
| Conservative | Felicity Barwood | 2,698 | 46.2 | |
| Conservative | Paul Lynch | 2,675 | 45.8 | |
| Liberal Democrats | Phyllis Ballentyne | 2,070 | 35.4 | |
| Labour | Judy Atkinson | 1,380 | 23.6 | |
| Green | David Goldsmith | 1,192 | 20.4 | |
| Labour | Val Yates | 1,148 | 19.6 | |
| Labour | Niamh O'Brady | 1,129 | 19.3 | |
| Turnout | | 5,844 | 68.3 | |
| Conservative hold | | Swing | | |
| Conservative hold | | Swing | | |
| Conservative hold | | Swing | | |

=== Cranford ===
Cranford (3)
| Party | Candidate | Votes | % | ±% |
|---|---|---|---|---|
| Labour | John Chatt | 2,318 | 46.4 | |
| Labour | Poonam Dhillon | 2,261 | 45.2 | |
| Labour | Sohan Singh Sangha | 2,228 | 44.6 | |
| Conservative | Les Bowdrey | 1,313 | 26.3 | |
| Conservative | Iqbal Butt | 1,286 | 25.7 | |
| Beavers Cranford Party | Sarbjit Singh Gill | 1,030 | 20.6 | |
| Conservative | Shafick Emmambokus | 1,009 | 20.2 | |
| Beavers Cranford Party | Parmod Kad | 966 | 19.3 | |
| Beavers Cranford Party | Sukhdev Singh Maras | 838 | 16.8 | |
| BNP | Lisa Vanstone | 202 | 4.0 | |
| Turnout | | 5,000 | 58.0 | |
| Labour hold | | Swing | | |
| Labour hold | | Swing | | |
| Labour hold | | Swing | | |

=== Feltham North ===
Feltham North (3)
| Party | Candidate | Votes | % | ±% |
|---|---|---|---|---|
| Conservative | Mark Bowen | 2,493 | 53.0 | |
| Conservative | Allan Wilson | 1,740 | 37.0 | |
| Conservative | Gill Hutchinson | 1,713 | 36.4 | |
| Labour | Syd Yates | 1,627 | 34.6 | |
| Labour | Sukhbir Singh Dhaliwal | 1,515 | 32.2 | |
| Labour | Dharmpal Dudee | 1,483 | 31.5 | |
| Liberal Democrats | Doug Edwards | 819 | 17.4 | |
| BNP | Jean Tomkins | 534 | 11.3 | |
| Turnout | | 4,705 | 57.6 | |
| Conservative hold | | Swing | | |
| Conservative hold | | Swing | | |
| Conservative hold | | Swing | | |

=== Feltham West ===
Feltham West (3)
| Party | Candidate | Votes | % | ±% |
|---|---|---|---|---|
| Conservative | Colin Botterill | 2,233 | 39.9 | |
| Labour | John Cooper | 2,123 | 38.0 | |
| Conservative | Barbara Harris | 2,084 | 37.3 | |
| Labour | Alan Mitchell | 1,916 | 34.3 | |
| Labour | Sally Scarlett | 1,865 | 33.3 | |
| Conservative | Koisor Khan | 1,571 | 28.1 | |
| Liberal Democrats | Joan Bennett | 1,368 | 24.5 | |
| BNP | James Taylor | 700 | 12.5 | |
| Turnout | | 5,593 | 54.8 | |
| Conservative hold | | Swing | | |
| Labour hold | | Swing | | |
| Conservative hold | | Swing | | |

=== Hanworth ===
Hanworth (3)
| Party | Candidate | Votes | % | ±% |
|---|---|---|---|---|
| Conservative | Andy Morgan-Watts | 1,478 | 32.4 | |
| Labour | David Hughes | 1,467 | 32.2 | |
| Labour | Alan Barber | 1,443 | 31.7 | |
| Conservative | Ann Daraz | 1,330 | 29.2 | |
| Conservative | Michael Daraz | 1,327 | 29.1 | |
| Labour | Mukesh Malhotra | 1,222 | 26.8 | |
| Liberal Democrats | Robert Smith | 914 | 20.1 | |
| Community Group | Linda Nakamura | 844 | 18.5 | |
| Community Group | Chris Nelhams | 732 | 16.1 | |
| Community Group | Ian Macintosh | 674 | 14.8 | |
| BNP | Maureen Taylor | 499 | 11.0 | |
| Green | Roger Williams | 102 | 2.2 | |
| Turnout | | 4,556 | 56.0 | |
| Conservative gain from Liberal Democrats | | Swing | | |
| Labour gain from Liberal Democrats | | Swing | | |
| Labour gain from Liberal Democrats | | Swing | | |

=== Hanworth Park ===
Hanworth Park (3)
| Party | Candidate | Votes | % | ±% |
|---|---|---|---|---|
| Conservative | Becky Stewart | 2,382 | 47.5 | |
| Conservative | Beverley Williams | 2,162 | 43.1 | |
| Conservative | Paul Jabbal | 2,120 | 42.3 | |
| Labour | Adrian Bayley | 1,633 | 32.6 | |
| Labour | Abid Chaudri | 1,298 | 25.9 | |
| Labour | Anant Sra | 1,212 | 24.2 | |
| Liberal Democrats | Simon Martin | 1,180 | 23.5 | |
| BNP | Katie Butler | 574 | 11.5 | |
| Turnout | | 5,011 | 61.6 | |
| Conservative hold | | Swing | | |
| Conservative hold | | Swing | | |
| Conservative hold | | Swing | | |

=== Heston Central ===
Heston Central (3)
| Party | Candidate | Votes | % | ±% |
|---|---|---|---|---|
| Labour | Mohinder Singh Gill | 2,739 | 53.3 | |
| Labour | Gopal Singh Dhillon | 2,692 | 52.4 | |
| Labour | Peta Vaught | 2,383 | 46.3 | |
| Conservative | Amarjit Singh Dhillon | 1,998 | 38.9 | |
| Conservative | Karamat Malik | 1,798 | 35.0 | |
| Conservative | Bhupindar Lakhanpaul | 1,793 | 34.9 | |
| Independent | Manu Tripathi | 529 | 10.3 | |
| Turnout | | 5,142 | 59.4 | |
| Labour hold | | Swing | | |
| Labour hold | | Swing | | |
| Labour hold | | Swing | | |

=== Heston East ===
Heston East (3)
| Party | Candidate | Votes | % | ±% |
|---|---|---|---|---|
| Labour | Kamaljit Kaur | 2,767 | 53.1 | |
| Labour | Gurmail Lal | 2,623 | 50.4 | |
| Labour | Amrit Mann | 2,589 | 49.7 | |
| Conservative | Mike Kenton | 1,560 | 29.9 | |
| Conservative | Meenu Dhiri | 1,387 | 26.6 | |
| Conservative | Stefan Poulos | 1,204 | 23.1 | |
| Independent | Rasheed Bhatti | 512 | 9.8 | |
| Green | Ian Rushworth | 501 | 9.6 | |
| Independent | Nick Marbrow | 452 | 8.7 | |
| Turnout | | 5,209 | 59.3 | |
| Labour hold | | Swing | | |
| Labour hold | | Swing | | |
| Labour hold | | Swing | | |

=== Heston West ===
Heston West (3)
| Party | Candidate | Votes | % | ±% |
|---|---|---|---|---|
| Labour | Rajinder Bath | 2,957 | 55.4 | |
| Labour | Elizabeth Hughes | 2,599 | 48.7 | |
| Labour | Shantanu Rajawat | 2,382 | 44.6 | |
| Conservative | Gurbachan Singh Athwal | 1,587 | 29.7 | |
| Conservative | Sukhjit Kaur Grewal | 1,511 | 28.3 | |
| Conservative | Ragveer Mattu | 1,263 | 23.6 | |
| Liberal Democrats | Bernard Brady | 820 | 15.4 | |
| Liberal Democrats | Alan Elliott | 810 | 15.2 | |
| Liberal Democrats | Mohammad Butt | 804 | 15.1 | |
| Turnout | | 5,342 | 60.8 | |
| Labour hold | | Swing | | |
| Labour hold | | Swing | | |
| Labour hold | | Swing | | |

=== Hounslow Central ===
Hounslow Central (3)
| Party | Candidate | Votes | % | ±% |
|---|---|---|---|---|
| Labour | Lily Bath | 3,057 | 53.8 | |
| Labour | Ajmer Grewal | 2,865 | 50.4 | |
| Labour | Pritam Grewal | 2,787 | 49.0 | |
| Conservative | Prianka Dillon | 1,814 | 31.9 | |
| Conservative | Christine Quick | 1,592 | 28.0 | |
| Conservative | Fauad Hafeez | 1,515 | 26.6 | |
| Liberal Democrats | Syed Ali | 1,224 | 21.5 | |
| Green | Toby Holmes | 624 | 11.0 | |
| Turnout | | 5,685 | 51.8 | |
| Labour hold | | Swing | | |
| Labour hold | | Swing | | |
| Labour hold | | Swing | | |

=== Hounslow Heath ===
Hounslow Heath (3)
| Party | Candidate | Votes | % | ±% |
|---|---|---|---|---|
| Labour | Colin Ellar | 2,559 | 47.1 | |
| Labour | Darshan Grewal | 2,533 | 46.6 | |
| Labour | Corinna Smart | 2,160 | 39.8 | |
| Conservative | Ranjit Gill | 1,342 | 24.7 | |
| Liberal Democrats | Sally Billenness | 1,290 | 23.7 | |
| Conservative | Ranjiv Godfrey | 1,238 | 22.8 | |
| Conservative | Sunny Kathuria | 1,213 | 22.3 | |
| Community Group | John Connelly | 983 | 18.1 | |
| Community Group | Surjit Singh Dhaliwal | 852 | 15.7 | |
| Community Group | Mohinder Singh | 695 | 12.8 | |
| Turnout | | 5,433 | 55.6 | |
| Labour hold | | Swing | | |
| Labour hold | | Swing | | |
| Labour hold | | Swing | | |

=== Hounslow South ===
Hounslow South (3)
| Party | Candidate | Votes | % | ±% |
|---|---|---|---|---|
| Conservative | Lin Davies | 2,232 | 39.4 | |
| Conservative | Pam Fisher | 2,163 | 38.2 | |
| Conservative | Brad Fisher | 2,114 | 37.4 | |
| Labour | Zara Malik | 2,059 | 36.4 | |
| Labour | Bob Whatley | 2,029 | 35.9 | |
| Labour | Dave Wetzel | 1,957 | 34.6 | |
| Community Group | Patricia Doran | 818 | 14.5 | |
| Community Group | Martin Murphy | 768 | 13.6 | |
| Green | Nicola Evans | 735 | 13.0 | |
| Community Group | Cheryl-Ann Khan | 699 | 12.4 | |
| Turnout | | 5,658 | 66.2 | |
| Conservative hold | | Swing | | |
| Conservative hold | | Swing | | |
| Conservative hold | | Swing | | |

=== Hounslow West ===
Hounslow West (3)
| Party | Candidate | Votes | % | ±% |
|---|---|---|---|---|
| Labour | Ajmer Dhillon | 2,772 | 54.4 | |
| Labour | Jagdish Sharma | 2,690 | 52.8 | |
| Labour | Balvir Sond | 2,234 | 43.8 | |
| Conservative | Abdul Majid | 1,440 | 28.2 | |
| Conservative | Lata Dhiri | 1,408 | 27.6 | |
| Conservative | Tony Viney | 1,257 | 24.7 | |
| Liberal Democrats | Noor Pasha | 948 | 18.6 | |
| Green | Winston Morson | 471 | 9.2 | |
| Independent | Vikas Agrawal | 188 | 3.7 | |
| Turnout | | 5,098 | 56.9 | |
| Labour hold | | Swing | | |
| Labour hold | | Swing | | |
| Labour hold | | Swing | | |

=== Isleworth ===
Isleworth (3)
| Party | Candidate | Votes | % | ±% |
|---|---|---|---|---|
| Labour | Sue Sampson | 1,914 | 36.6 | |
| Labour | Mindu Bains | 1,872 | 35.8 | |
| Labour | Ed Mayne | 1,819 | 34.8 | |
| Community Group | Philip Andrews | 1,741 | 33.3 | |
| Community Group | Paul Fisher | 1,530 | 29.3 | |
| Conservative | Andrew Binns | 1,322 | 25.3 | |
| Community Group | Andrew Sibley | 1,312 | 25.1 | |
| Conservative | Jenny Stoker | 1,260 | 24.1 | |
| Conservative | Jane Vougioukas | 993 | 19.0 | |
| Green | John Ferris | 693 | 13.3 | |
| Turnout | | 5,226 | 62.9 | |
| Labour gain from Community Group | | Swing | | |
| Labour gain from Community Group | | Swing | | |
| Labour gain from Community Group | | Swing | | |

=== Osterley & Spring Grove ===
Osterley & Spring Grove (3)
| Party | Candidate | Votes | % | ±% |
|---|---|---|---|---|
| Conservative | Sheila O'Reilly | 2,554 | 43.2 | |
| Conservative | Peter Carey | 2,444 | 41.4 | |
| Conservative | Barbara Reid | 2,327 | 39.4 | |
| Labour | Harleen Atwal | 2,021 | 34.2 | |
| Labour | Virender Choudhry | 1,910 | 32.3 | |
| Labour | Nisar Malik | 1,829 | 30.9 | |
| Liberal Democrats | John James | 1,382 | 23.4 | |
| Green | Tom Beaton | 764 | 12.9 | |
| Turnout | | 5,910 | 62.2 | |
| Conservative hold | | Swing | | |
| Conservative hold | | Swing | | |
| Conservative hold | | Swing | | |

=== Syon ===
Syon (3)
| Party | Candidate | Votes | % | ±% |
|---|---|---|---|---|
| Labour | Steve Curran | 1,898 | 35.1 | |
| Labour | Theo Dennison | 1,816 | 33.6 | |
| Labour | Jason Ellar | 1,649 | 30.5 | |
| Conservative | Brenda Pooley | 1,367 | 25.3 | |
| Community Group | Caroline Andrews | 1,360 | 25.2 | |
| Community Group | Jonathon Hardy | 1,324 | 24.5 | |
| Conservative | Claire Stanniland | 1,260 | 23.3 | |
| Community Group | Shirley Fisher | 1,253 | 23.2 | |
| Conservative | Vicky Thomas | 1,131 | 20.9 | |
| Green | John Bradley | 659 | 12.2 | |
| Green | John Hunt | 630 | 11.7 | |
| Green | Diane Scott | 461 | 8.5 | |
| UKIP | Jason Hargreaves | 383 | 7.1 | |
| Turnout | | 5,403 | 58.8 | |
| Labour gain from Community Group | | Swing | | |
| Labour gain from Community Group | | Swing | | |
| Labour gain from Community Group | | Swing | | |

=== Turnham Green ===
Turnham Green (3)
| Party | Candidate | Votes | % | ±% |
|---|---|---|---|---|
| Conservative | Samantha Davies | 2,620 | 48.6 | |
| Conservative | Adrian Lee | 2,475 | 45.9 | |
| Conservative | Peter Thompson | 2,469 | 45.8 | |
| Liberal Democrats | Ian Mann | 1,879 | 34.9 | |
| Labour | David McLoughlin | 1,346 | 25.0 | |
| Labour | Jack Mayorcas | 1,276 | 23.7 | |
| Green | Anthony Aguis | 1,079 | 20.0 | |
| Labour | Peter Nathan | 1,050 | 19.5 | |
| Turnout | | 5,389 | 64.2 | |
| Conservative hold | | Swing | | |
| Conservative hold | | Swing | | |
| Conservative hold | | Swing | | |
