= 2006 Hounslow London Borough Council election =

- 4 May 2006

All 60 seats to Hounslow London Borough Council 31 seats needed for a majority
	First party	Second party	Third party
Party	Labour	Conservative	Community Group
Seats won	24	23	6
Seat change	▼12	▲8	▲3
Popular vote	19,205	20,019	4,008
Percentage	28.7%	29.9%	6.0%
Swing	▼8.9%	▲0.6%	▲0.4%
	Fourth party	Fifth party
Party	Liberal Democrats	Hounslow Independent Alliance
Seats won	5	2
Seat change	Steady	▲2
Popular vote	12,573	4,695
Percentage	18.8%	7.0%
Swing	▲5.5%	New
- Map of the results of the 2006 Hounslow council election. Conservatives in blue, Labour in red, Liberal Democrats in yellow, The Community in green and Hounslow Independent Alliance in white.
Council control before election
Labour
Council control after election
No overall control

The 2006 Hounslow Council election took place on 4 May 2006 to elect members of Hounslow London Borough Council in London, England. The whole council was up for election and the Labour Party lost control of the council, but remained the largest party. Meanwhile, the Conservatives gained 8 seats from Labour, with the Community Group gaining 3 seats and Hounslow Independent Alliance gaining 2.

== Election result ==
Hounslow local election result 2006
Party	Seats	Gains	Losses	Net gain/loss	Seats %	Votes %	Votes	+/−
Labour	24	0	12	▼12	40.0	28.7	19,205	▼8.9
Conservative	23	8	0	▲8	38.3	29.9	20,019	▲0.6
Community Group	6	3	0	▲3	10.0	6.0	4,008	▲0.4
Liberal Democrats	5	1	1	Steady	8.3	18.8	12,573	▲5.5
Hounslow Independent Alliance	2	2	0	▲2	3.3	7.0	4,695	New
Green	0	0	0	Steady	0.0	6.9	4,593	▲3.5
National Front	0	0	0	Steady	0.0	1.5	1,009	New
Independent	0	0	0	Steady	0.0	1.2	824	▲0.4

== Ward results ==
=== Bedfont ===
Bedfont (3)
Party	Candidate	Votes	%	±%
Liberal Democrats	John Howliston	882	30.2	
Hounslow Independent Alliance	Peter Hills	749	25.6	
Labour	Jiwan Virk	745	25.5	
Labour	Rachel Heydon	670		
Hounslow Independent Alliance	Kenneth Horwell	642		
Labour	David Hughes	629		
Liberal Democrats	Reetendra Banerji	583		
Liberal Democrats	Girish Rach	574		
Conservative	Clara Catherall	549	18.8	
Hounslow Independent Alliance	Julius Lobo	533		
Conservative	Manohar Dhiri	474		
Conservative	Ronald Mushiso	452		
Turnout			37.4	
Liberal Democrats hold		Swing		
Hounslow Independent Alliance gain from Liberal Democrats				
Labour hold		Swing		

=== Brentford ===
Brentford (3)
Party	Candidate	Votes	%	±%
Labour	Ruth Cadbury	1,447	33.3	
Labour	Matthew Harmer	1,313		
Liberal Democrats	Andrew Dakers	1,265	29.1	
Labour	Alan Sheerins	1,214		
Liberal Democrats	Sunaina Kumar	947		
Conservative	Thomas Hearn	824	18.9	
Green	John Hunt	815	18.7	
Turnout			40.3	
Labour hold		Swing		
Labour hold		Swing		
Liberal Democrats gain from A BEE C				

=== Chiswick Homefields ===
Chiswick Homefields (3)
Party	Candidate	Votes	%	±%
Conservative	Gerald McGregor	1,654	45.5	
Conservative	John Todd	1,608		
Conservative	Robert Oulds	1,540		
Liberal Democrats	Phyllis Ballentyne	698	19.2	
Labour	Ann Glennerster	657	18.1	
Green	Martin Bleach	628	17.3	
Labour	Caroline Needham	591		
Labour	Anita Soley	565		
Turnout			39.6	
Conservative hold		Swing		
Conservative hold		Swing		
Conservative hold		Swing		

=== Chiswick Riverside ===
Chiswick Riverside (3)
Party	Candidate	Votes	%	±%
Conservative	Felicity Barwood	1,803	45.0	
Conservative	Paul Lynch	1,775		
Conservative	Robert Kinghorn	1,709		
Liberal Democrats	Julie Thomas	795	19.8	
Labour	Pamela Smith	713	17.8	
Green	John Devaney	698	17.4	
Labour	Matthew Delaney	694		
Labour	Mukesh Malhotra	509		
Turnout			41.4	
Conservative hold		Swing		
Conservative hold		Swing		
Conservative hold		Swing		

=== Cranford ===
Cranford (3)
Party	Candidate	Votes	%	±%
Labour	Poonam Dhillon	1,346	40.8	
Labour	Mohammed Chaudhary	1,275		
Labour	Sohan Singh Sangha	1,254		
Hounslow Independent Alliance	Sarbjit Singh Gill	971	29.4	
Hounslow Independent Alliance	Parmod Kad	922		
Hounslow Independent Alliance	Sukhdev Singh Maras	815		
Conservative	Jack Austin	491	14.9	
Liberal Democrats	Saima Hameed	431	13.1	
Liberal Democrats	Andrew Darley	417		
Independent	Warwick Prachar	61	1.8	
Turnout			40.8	
Labour hold		Swing		
Labour hold		Swing		
Labour hold		Swing		

=== Feltham North ===
Feltham North (3)
Party	Candidate	Votes	%	±%
Conservative	Robert Bowen	1,917	56.7	
Conservative	Gillian Hutchison	1,491		
Conservative	Allan Wilson	1,477		
Labour	Michael Hunt	750	22.2	
Labour	Michael Carman	709		
Labour	Harbinder Sarai	645		
National Front	Pamela Chambers	411	12.2	
Liberal Democrats	Douglas Edwards	301	8.9	
Turnout			39.9	
Conservative hold		Swing		
Conservative gain from Labour		Swing		
Conservative gain from Labour		Swing		

=== Feltham West ===
Feltham West (3)
Party	Candidate	Votes	%	±%
Conservative	Barbara Harris	1,082	36.2	
Conservative	Peter Pitt	988		
Labour	John Cooper	879	29.4	
Labour	Sarah Scarlett	791		
Labour	Krishan Chopra	767		
Conservative	Meenu Dhiri	759		
National Front	Francis McAllister	598	20.0	
Liberal Democrats	Lakhbir Singh	429	14.4	
Turnout			32.1	
Conservative gain from Labour		Swing		
Conservative gain from Labour		Swing		
Labour hold		Swing		

=== Hanworth ===
Hanworth (3)
Party	Candidate	Votes	%	±%
Liberal Democrats	Andrew Morgan-Watts	1,110	38.3	
Liberal Democrats	Drew Morgan-Watts	1,039		
Liberal Democrats	Linda Nakamura	825		
Conservative	Sandra Cullinane	579	20.0	
Labour	Michael Ogunseye	536	18.5	
Labour	Abid Chaudri	530		
Labour	Kirpa Singh Nannar	482		
Green	Stephen Smith	380	13.1	
Independent	Roger Williams	291	10.0	
Turnout			32.4	
Liberal Democrats hold		Swing		
Liberal Democrats hold		Swing		
Liberal Democrats hold		Swing		

=== Hanworth Park ===
Hanworth Park (3)
Party	Candidate	Votes	%	±%
Conservative	Rebecca Stewart	1,418	44.4	
Conservative	Harley Buckner	1,385		
Conservative	Beverley Williams	1,374		
Labour	Stuart Walmsley	840	26.3	
Labour	Colin Ellar	804		
Labour	Bobbie Wason	795		
Liberal Democrats	Harris Matovu	498	15.6	
Hounslow Independent Alliance	Vanessa Smith	440	13.8	
Turnout			38.3	
Conservative gain from Labour		Swing		
Conservative gain from Labour		Swing		
Conservative gain from Labour		Swing		

=== Heston Central ===
Heston Central (3)
Party	Candidate	Votes	%	±%
Labour	Gopal Singh Dhillon	1,133	37.3	
Labour	Mohinder Singh Gill	1,129		
Labour	Peta Vaught	972		
Conservative	Arti Jangra	832	27.4	
Conservative	Naman Kaur Purewal	801		
Conservative	Nathalal Taank	781		
Hounslow Independent Alliance	Sheila Brown	739	24.3	
Hounslow Independent Alliance	Karamat Malik	717		
Hounslow Independent Alliance	Jagjit Singh Sidhu	573		
Liberal Democrats	Narinderjit Kaur Patel	337	11.1	
Turnout			38.2	
Labour hold		Swing		
Labour hold		Swing		
Labour hold		Swing		

=== Heston East ===
Heston East (3)
Party	Candidate	Votes	%	±%
Labour	Shivcharn Singh Gill	1,327	45.7	
Labour	Gurmail Singh Lal	1,264		
Labour	Amritpal Singh Mann	1,249		
Conservative	Christine Quick	893	30.8	
Conservative	Hasan Imam	806		
Conservative	Onkar Sachdev	803		
Green	Iain Martin	381	13.1	
Liberal Democrats	Cornelis Singh Heule	300	10.3	
Liberal Democrats	Regine Adamaszek	297		
Turnout			34.9	
Labour hold		Swing		
Labour hold		Swing		
Labour hold		Swing		

=== Heston West ===
Heston West (3)
Party	Candidate	Votes	%	±%
Labour	Rajinder Singh Bath	1,409	45.6	
Labour	Sukhbir Singh Dhaliwal	1,223		
Labour	Elizabeth Hughes	1,219		
Liberal Democrats	Satnam Kaur Khalsa	1,059	34.2	
Liberal Democrats	Patricia Braby	973		
Liberal Democrats	Mohammad Butt	881		
Conservative	Kevin O'Reilly	625	20.2	
Turnout			39.3	
Labour hold		Swing		
Labour hold		Swing		
Labour hold		Swing		

=== Hounslow Central ===
Hounslow Central (3)
Party	Candidate	Votes	%	±%
Labour	Pritam Singh Grewal	1,203	30.9	
Labour	Lily Bath	1,190		
Labour	Nisar Malik	1,045		
Conservative	Michael Kenton	897	23.0	
Hounslow Independent Alliance	Anthony Cooper	724	18.6	
Hounslow Independent Alliance	Shan Singh Jassar	629		
Green	Carl Fletcher	556	14.3	
Hounslow Independent Alliance	Ilyas Khwaja	540		
Liberal Democrats	Syed Akhtar	519	13.3	
Turnout			37.1	
Labour hold		Swing		
Labour hold		Swing		
Labour hold		Swing		

=== Hounslow Heath ===
Hounslow Heath (3)
Party	Candidate	Votes	%	±%
Labour	Darshan Singh Grewal	1,133	31.5	
Labour	Surjit Singh Dhaliwal	1,118		
Hounslow Independent Alliance	John Connelly	1,072	29.8	
Labour	Mazhar Raja	1,023		
Hounslow Independent Alliance	Mohammad Butt	831		
Hounslow Independent Alliance	Mohinder Singh	675		
Liberal Democrats	Sonia Kumar	480	13.3	
Independent	Dalbir Singh Cheema	472	13.1	
Conservative	Ravinder Kaushal	440	12.2	
Conservative	Gian Notay	421		
Conservative	Kirpal Notay	368		
Turnout			36.9	
Labour hold		Swing		
Labour hold		Swing		
Hounslow Independent Alliance gain from Labour				

=== Hounslow South ===
Hounslow South (3)
Party	Candidate	Votes	%	±%
Conservative	Linda Davies	1,358	32.7	
Conservative	Bradley Fisher	1,316		
Conservative	Pamela Fisher	1,297		
Labour	Robert Whatley	1,117	26.9	
Labour	Ajit Singh	1,115		
Labour	Seema Malhotra	1,064		
Community Group	Andrew Sibley	1,005	24.2	
Liberal Democrats	Timothy Haigh	672	16.2	
Turnout			46.6	
Conservative hold		Swing		
Conservative gain from Labour		Swing		
Conservative hold		Swing		

=== Hounslow West ===
Hounslow West (3)
Party	Candidate	Votes	%	±%
Labour	Jagdish Sharma	1,496	50.9	
Labour	Ajmer Singh Dhillon	1,459		
Labour	Ajmer Grewal	1,279		
Conservative	Gian Gaur	734	25.0	
Liberal Democrats	Sarbjit Singh Johal	709	24.1	
Liberal Democrats	Noor Pasha	700		
Turnout			34.2	
Labour hold		Swing		
Labour hold		Swing		
Labour hold		Swing		

=== Isleworth ===
Isleworth (3)
Party	Candidate	Votes	%	±%
Community Group	Philip Andrews	1,240	42.7	
Community Group	Paul Fisher	1,163		
Community Group	Genevieve Hibbs	1,074		
Labour	Christopher Boucher	829	28.6	
Labour	Susan Sampson	823		
Labour	Anthony McKendry	767		
Conservative	Brenda Pooley	448	15.4	
Conservative	Donald Burling	409		
Liberal Democrats	Shaun Taylor	384	13.2	
Conservative	Aarti Bhanderi	357		
Turnout			36.9	
Community Group hold		Swing		
Community Group hold		Swing		
Community Group hold		Swing		

=== Osterley and Spring Grove ===
Osterley and Spring Grove (3)
Party	Candidate	Votes	%	±%
Conservative	Sheila O'Reilly	1,428	38.7	
Conservative	Barbara Reid	1,398		
Conservative	Peter Carey	1,358		
Labour	Antony Louki	768	20.8	
Labour	Nisma Malik	729		
Labour	Tarlochan Singh Toor	715		
Liberal Democrats	John James	611	16.6	
Green	Thomas Beaton	535	14.5	
Community Group	Cheryl-Ann Khan	346	9.4	
Turnout			36.5	
Conservative hold		Swing		
Conservative hold		Swing		
Conservative hold		Swing		

=== Syon ===
Syon (3)
Party	Candidate	Votes	%	±%
Community Group	Caroline Andrews	1,417	44.2	
Community Group	Jonathan Hardy	1,353		
Community Group	Shirley Fisher	1,329		
Labour	Melvin Collins	814	25.4	
Labour	Corinna Smart	810		
Labour	Valerie Lamey	798		
Conservative	Finian Manson	524	16.4	
Conservative	Kulveer Singh Ranger	458		
Liberal Democrats	Priscilla Wingate-Saul	449	14.0	
Turnout			36.0	
Community Group gain from Labour		Swing		
Community Group gain from Labour		Swing		
Community Group gain from Labour		Swing		

=== Turnham Green ===
Turnham Green (3)
Party	Candidate	Votes	%	±%
Conservative	Samantha Davies	1,523	45.2	
Conservative	Peter Thompson	1,517		
Conservative	Adrian Lee	1,446		
Liberal Democrats	Henry Kay	644	19.1	
Green	Anthony Agius	600	17.8	
Labour	David McLoughlin	599	17.8	
Labour	Bandna Chopra	441		
Labour	Faheem Aziz	404		
Turnout			36.2	
Conservative hold		Swing		
Conservative hold		Swing		
Conservative hold		Swing		
