= Labinsky otdel =

Coordinates: 45°00′N 41°07′E

Labinsky otdel Лабинскій отдѣлъ
- Otdel
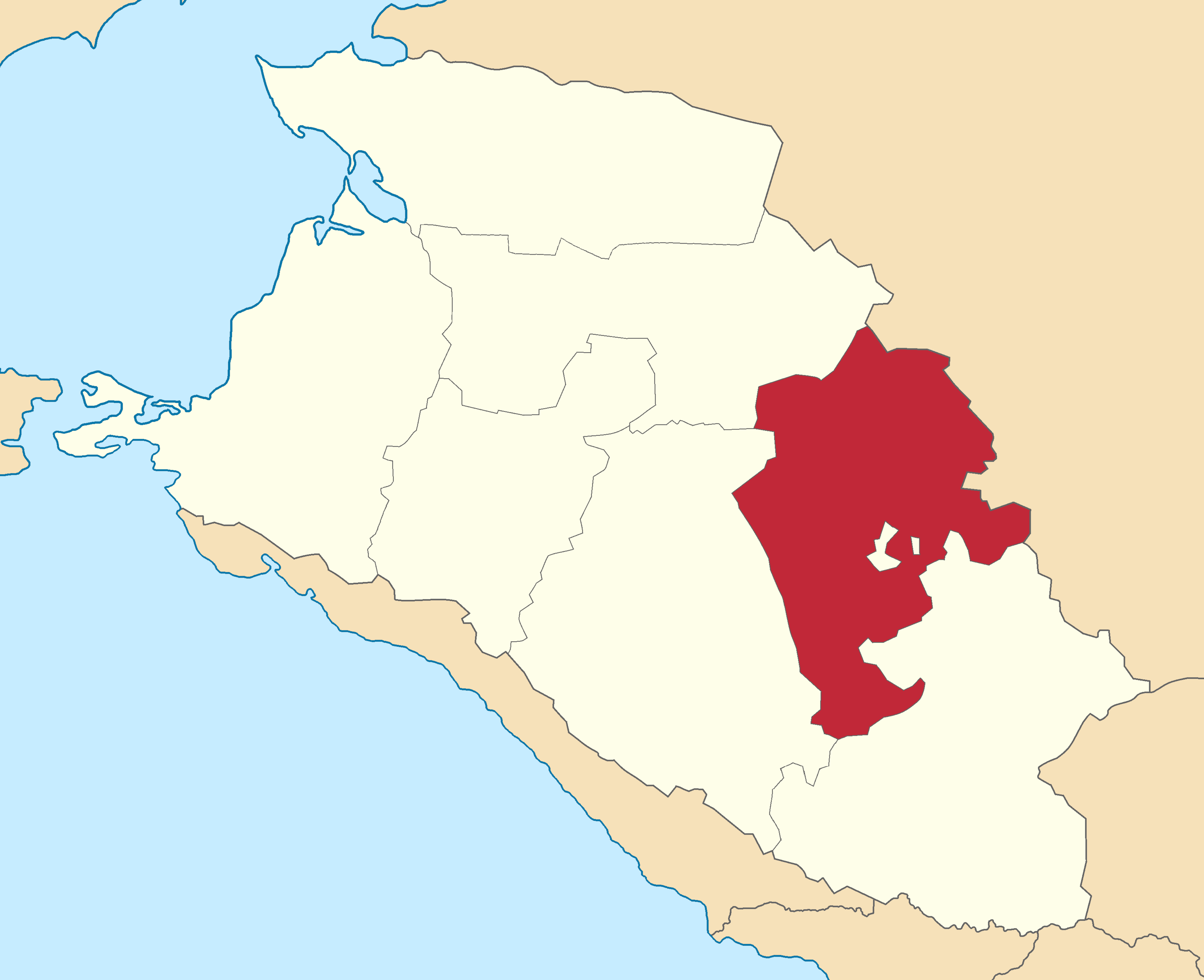
- Location in the Kuban Oblast
- Country: Russian Empire
- Viceroyalty: Caucasus
- Oblast: Kuban
- Established: 1888
- Abolished: 1924
- Capital: Armavir

Area
  - Total: 6,737.26 km^{2} (2,601.27 sq mi)

Population (1916)
  - Total: 518,774
  - Density: 77.0007/km^{2} (199.431/sq mi)
  - Urban: 9.04%
  - Rural: 90.96%

The Labinsky otdel (Note: Russian: Лаби́нскій отдѣ́лъ, romanized: Labínsky otdél) was a Cossack district (otdel) of the Kuban oblast of the Caucasus Viceroyalty of the Russian Empire. It bordered the Kavkazsky otdel to the north, the Maykopsky otdel to the west, the Batalpashinsky otdel to the south, and the Stavropol Governorate to the east. The area of the Labinsky otdel mostly corresponded to the contemporary Krasnodar Krai region of the Russian Federation. The administrative capital of the district was the city of Armavir.

== Administrative divisions ==
The subcounties (uchastoks) of the Labinsky otdel in 1912 were as follows:

Name	1912 population
1-y uchastok (1-й участокъ)	37,897
2-y uchastok (2-й участокъ)	65,810
3-y uchastok (3-й участокъ)	58,973
4-y uchastok (4-й участокъ)	62,311

== Demographics ==
=== Russian Empire Census ===
According to the Russian Empire Census, the Labinsky otdel had a population of 305,733 on 28 January [O.S. 15 January] 1897, including 154,396 men and 151,337 women. The majority of the population indicated Russian to be their mother tongue, with a significant Ukrainian speaking minority.

Linguistic composition of the Labinsky otdel in 1897
Language	Native speakers	%
Russian	229,954	75.21
Ukrainian	57,850	18.92
German	5,870	1.92
Armenian	5,162	1.69
Belarusian	3,881	1.27
Greek	453	0.15
Romanian	375	0.12
Polish	380	0.12
Circassian	302	0.10
Tatar (Note: Before 1918, Azerbaijanis were generally known as "Tatars". This term, employed by the Russians, referred to Turkic-speaking Muslims of the South Caucasus. After 1918, with the establishment of the Azerbaijan Democratic Republic and "especially during the Soviet era", the Tatar group identified itself as "Azerbaijani".)	286	0.09
Romani	243	0.08
Georgian	132	0.04
Czech	97	0.03
Turkish	93	0.03
Bulgarian	86	0.03
Jewish	85	0.03
Mordovian	85	0.03
Kalmyk	59	0.02
Nogai	58	0.02
Persian	40	0.01
Lithuanian	39	0.01
Ossetian	25	0.01
Estonian	21	0.01
Kazi-Kumukh	16	0.01
Kabardian	14	0.00
Avar-Andean	13	0.00
Latvian	12	0.00
Abkhaz	8	0.00
Kumyk	8	0.00
Kyurin	7	0.00
Karachay	3	0.00
Other	76	0.02
TOTAL	305,733	100.00

=== Kavkazskiy kalendar ===
According to the 1917 publication of Kavkazskiy kalendar, the Labinsky otdel had a population of 518,774 on 14 January [O.S. 1 January] 1916, including 260,553 men and 258,221 women, 283,586 of whom were the permanent population, and 235,188 were temporary residents:

Nationality	Urban		Rural		TOTAL	
Nationality	Number	%	Number	%	Number	%
Russians	35,185	75.06	464,999	98.54	500,184	96.42
Armenians	8,415	17.95	735	0.16	9,150	1.76
Other Europeans	3,074	6.56	5,861	1.24	8,935	1.72
North Caucasians	192	0.41	214	0.05	406	0.08
Roma	0	0.00	57	0.01	57	0.01
Jews	7	0.00	20	0.00	27	0.01
Shia Muslims (Note: Primarily Tatars.)	0	0.00	5	0.00	5	0.00
Georgians	0	0.00	6	0.00	6	0.00
Asiatic Christians	0	0.00	2	0.00	2	0.00
Sunni Muslims (Note: Primarily Turco-Tatars.)	0	0.00	2	0.00	2	0.00
TOTAL	46,873	100.00	471,901	100.00	518,774	100.00

== Bibliography ==
- Bournoutian, George A. (2018). Armenia and Imperial Decline: The Yerevan Province, 1900–1914. Milton Park, Abingdon, Oxon: Routledge. ISBN 978-1-351-06260-2. OCLC 1037283914.
- Hovannisian, Richard G. (1971). The Republic of Armenia. Vol. 1: The First Year, 1918–1919. Berkeley: University of California Press. ISBN 978-0520019843.
- Кавказский календарь на 1913 год [Caucasian calendar for 1913] (in Russian) (68th ed.). Tiflis: Tipografiya kantselyarii Ye.I.V. na Kavkaze, kazenny dom. 1913. Archived from the original on 19 April 2022.
- Кавказский календарь на 1917 год [Caucasian calendar for 1917] (in Russian) (72nd ed.). Tiflis: Tipografiya kantselyarii Ye.I.V. na Kavkaze, kazenny dom. 1917. Archived from the original on 4 November 2021.
- Tsutsiev, Arthur (2014). Atlas of the Ethno-Political History of the Caucasus (PDF). Translated by Nora Seligman Favorov. New Haven: Yale University Press. ISBN 9780300153088. Archived (PDF) from the original on 17 June 2023.
