= Ivan Berezutsky =

Russian chef

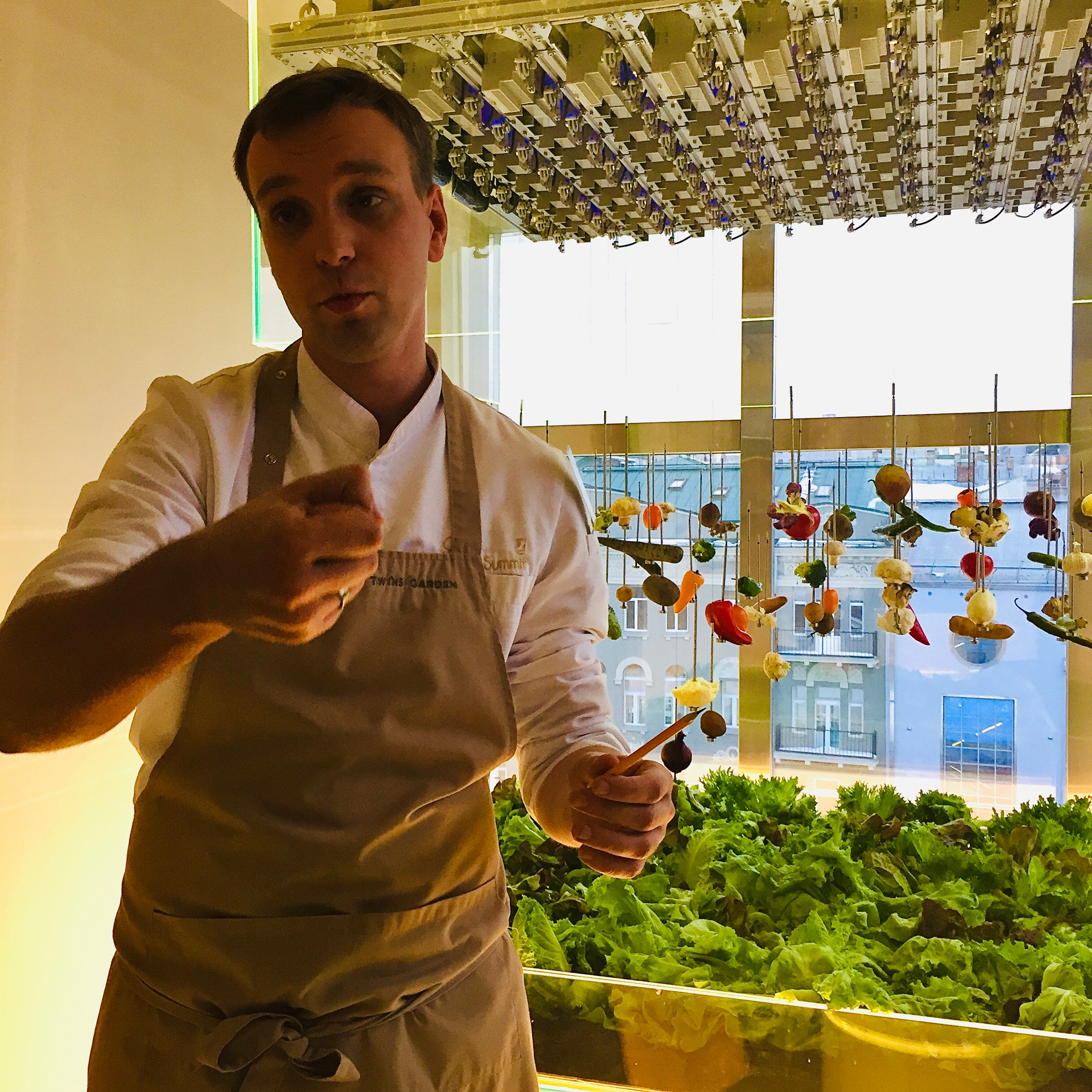
Berezutsky in 2018

Ivan Anatolyevich Berezutsky (Russian: Иван Анатольевич Березуцкий; born December 6, 1985, in Armavir, Soviet Union) is a Russian chef and restaurateur, a chef at the Twins Garden restaurant in Moscow, and a holder of two Michelin stars. In 2019, Twins Garden took 19th place in the international rating of The World's 50 Best Restaurants, having risen by 53 points in comparison with the previous year and was named to be the best restaurant in Moscow (2018-2021) and the best restaurant in Russia (2020, 2022) in the nomination of the national restaurant awards WHERETOEAT Russia. He is the twin brother of chef and restaurateur Sergei Berezutsky.
