= Kuban oblast =

Coordinates: 45°02′N 38°58′E

Kuban oblast Кубанская область
- Oblast
- Coat of arms

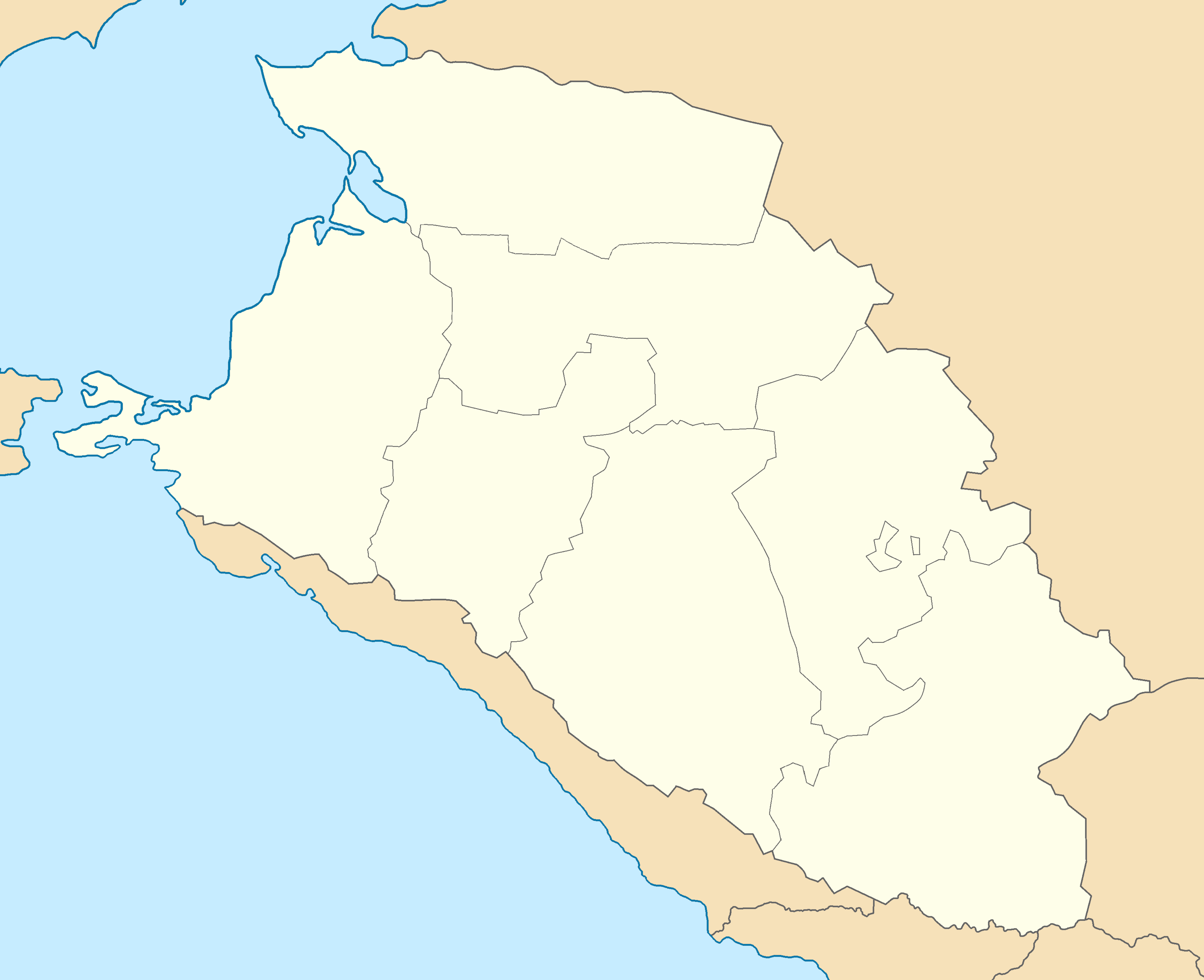
- Administrative map of the Kuban Oblast
- Country: Russian Empire
- Viceroyalty: Caucasus
- Established: 1860
- Abolished: 1917
- Capital: Yekaterinodar (present-day Krasnodar)

Area
  - Total: 94,783.07 km^{2} (36,595.95 sq mi)
- Highest elevation (Mount Elbrus): 5,642 m (18,510 ft)

Population (1916)
  - Total: 3,022,683
  - Density: 31.89054/km^{2} (82.59611/sq mi)
  - Urban: 9.52%
  - Rural: 90.48%

The Kuban oblast (Note: Russian: Куба́нская о́бласть, romanized: Kubánskaya óblast; Ukrainian: Кубанська область, romanized: Kubanska oblast) was a province (oblast) of the Caucasus Viceroyalty of the Russian Empire. It roughly corresponded to most of the Kuban and Circassia regions. It was created in 1860 out of Kuban Cossack territories that had once been part of the Crimean Khanate and the land of the Circassians. It was dissolved upon the assumption of supreme authority by the Kuban Rada in 1917 and the independence of the Kuban People's Republic in 1918. Its capital was the city of Yekaterinodar (present-day Krasnodar).

== Administrative divisions ==
The Cossack districts (otdels) of the Kuban oblast in 1917 were as follows:

Name	Administrative centre and the largest city			Population		Area
Name		1897	1916	1897	1916	Area
Batalpashinsky otdel (Баталпашинскій отдѣлъ)	Batalpashinskaya (Cherkessk)	11,473	---	215,400	298,208	15,328.05 square versts (17,444.27 km^{2}; 6,735.27 mi^{2})
Yeysky otdel (Ейскій отдѣлъ)	Yeysk	35,414	44,765	277,300	384,846	12,127.84 square versts (13,802.24 km^{2}; 5,329.07 mi^{2})
Yeysky otdel (Ейскій отдѣлъ)	Umanskaya (Leningradskaya)	11,137	---	277,300	384,846	12,127.84 square versts (13,802.24 km^{2}; 5,329.07 mi^{2})
Yekaterinodarsky otdel (Екатеринодарскій отдѣлъ)	Yekaterinodar (Krasnodar)	65,606	103,624	245,173	371,788	7,357.78 square versts (8,373.61 km^{2}; 3,233.07 mi^{2})
Kavkazsky otdel (Кавказскій отдѣлъ)	Kavkazskaya	8,293	---	249,182	462,235	13,941.40 square versts (15,866.18 km^{2}; 6,125.97 mi^{2})
Labinsky otdel (Лабинскій отдѣлъ)	Armavir	18,113	46,873	305,733	518,774	5,919.94 square versts (6,737.26 km^{2}; 2,601.27 mi^{2})
Maykopsky otdel (Майкопскій отдѣлъ)	Maykop	34,327	54,762	283,117	468,453	14,435.76 square versts (16,428.79 km^{2}; 6,343.19 mi^{2})
Tamansky otdel (Таманскій отдѣлъ)	Slavyanskaya (Slavyansk-na-Kubani)	15,167	---	342,976	518,379	14,173.84 square versts (16,130.71 km^{2}; 6,228.10 mi^{2})
Tamansky otdel (Таманскій отдѣлъ)	Temryuk	14,734	20,221	342,976	518,379	14,173.84 square versts (16,130.71 km^{2}; 6,228.10 mi^{2})

=== Structure ===
The militarized nature of the Kuban meant that, rather than a traditional governorate (guberniya) with counties (uezds), the territory was administered by the Kuban Cossacks as an oblast which was split into otdels. Each otdel had its own sotnias which in turn would be split into stanitsas and khutors. The ataman ("commander") for each region was not only responsible for the military preparation of the Cossacks, but for the local administration duties. Local stanitsa and khutor atamans were elected, but approved by the atamans of the otdel. These, in turn, were appointed by the supreme ataman of the Kuban host, who was in turn appointed directly by the Russian emperor. Prior to 1870, this system of legislature in the oblast remained a robust military one and all legal decisions were carried out by the stanitsa ataman and two elected judges. Afterwards, however, the system was bureaucratized and the judicial functions were independent of the stanitsas.

== Demographics ==
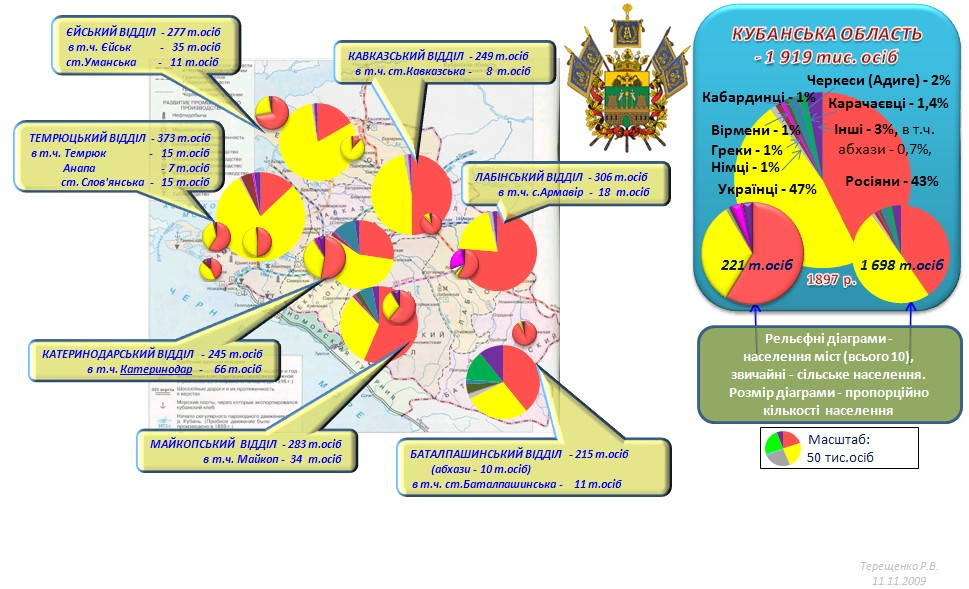
Ethnic groups in 1897; yellow represents Ukrainians and red, Russians (in Ukrainian)

=== Russian Empire Census ===
According to the Russian Empire Census, the Kuban oblast had a population of 1,918,881 on 28 January [O.S. 15 January] 1897, including 973,023 men and 945,858 women. The plurality of the population indicated Ukrainian to be their mother tongue, with a significant Russian speaking minority.

Linguistic composition of the Kuban oblast in 1897
Language	Native speakers	%
Ukrainian	908,818	47.36
Russian	816,734	42.56
Circassian	38,488	2.01
Karachay	26,877	1.40
German	20,778	1.08
Greek	20,137	1.05
Kabardian	14,340	0.75
Armenian	13,926	0.73
Abkhaz	12,481	0.65
Belarusian	12,356	0.64
Nogai	5,880	0.31
Romanian	5,370	0.28
Tatar (Note: Before 1918, Azerbaijanis were generally known as "Tatars". This term, employed by the Russians, referred to Turkic-speaking Muslims of the South Caucasus. After 1918, with the establishment of the Azerbaijan Democratic Republic and "especially during the Soviet era", the Tatar group identified itself as "Azerbaijani".)	3,848	0.20
Polish	2,719	0.14
Turkish	2,187	0.11
Ossetian	1,973	0.10
Jewish	1,942	0.10
Romani	1,753	0.09
Mordovian	1,494	0.08
Czech	1,213	0.06
Georgian	917	0.05
Estonian	880	0.05
Latvian	848	0.04
Kyurin	615	0.03
Kalmyk	378	0.02
Bulgarian	322	0.02
Persian	252	0.01
Lithuanian	238	0.01
Kumyk	205	0.01
Kazi-Kumukh	175	0.01
Bashkir	138	0.01
Avar-Andean	127	0.01
Other	472	0.02
TOTAL	1,918,881	100.00

Religious composition of the Kuban oblast in 1897
Faith	Male	Female	Both	
Faith	Male	Female	Number	%
Eastern Orthodox	884,028	863,291	1,747,319	91.06
Muslim	53,199	49,721	102,920	5.36
Old Believer	12,363	12,580	24,943	1.30
Lutheran	8,559	8,182	16,741	0.87
Armenian Apostolic	7,997	6,653	14,650	0.76
Roman Catholic	4,413	3,121	7,534	0.39
Judaism	1,084	1,021	2,105	0.11
Mennonite	567	580	1,147	0.06
Reformed	425	409	834	0.04
Buddhist	194	161	355	0.02
Armenian Catholic	104	39	143	0.01
Karaite	42	49	91	0.00
Baptist	33	43	76	0.00
Other Christian denomination	10	4	14	0.00
Other non-Christian denomination	5	4	9	0.00
TOTAL	973,023	945,858	1,918,881	100.00

=== Kavkazskiy kalendar ===
A 1916 map of Kuban Oblast with the neighboring Black Sea Governorate and part of Sukhumi Okrug (in Russian).

According to the 1917 publication of Kavkazskiy kalendar, the Kuban oblast had a population of 3,022,683 on 14 January [O.S. 1 January] 1916, including 1,523,057 men and 1,499,626 women, 1,870,280 of whom were the permanent population, and 1,152,403 were temporary residents.

Nationality	Urban		Rural		TOTAL	
Nationality	Number	%	Number	%	Number	%
Russians	257,675	89.50	2,561,356	93.66	2,819,031	93.26
North Caucasians	674	0.23	132,997	4.86	133,671	4.42
Other Europeans	10,098	3.51	20,667	0.76	30,765	1.02
Armenians	15,557	5.40	9,014	0.33	24,571	0.81
Sunni Muslims (Note: Primarily Turco-Tatars.)	1,144	0.40	5,292	0.19	6,436	0.21
Asiatic Christians	390	0.14	3,270	0.12	3,660	0.12
Jews	1,180	0.41	1,173	0.04	2,353	0.08
Georgians	766	0.27	230	0.01	996	0.03
Shia Muslims (Note: Primarily Tatars.)	94	0.03	720	0.03	814	0.03
Roma	278	0.10	63	0.00	341	0.01
Kurds	45	0.02	0	0.00	45	0.00
TOTAL	287,901	100.00	2,734,782	100.00	3,022,683	100.00

== Bibliography ==
- Bournoutian, George A. (2018). Armenia and Imperial Decline: The Yerevan Province, 1900–1914. Milton Park, Abingdon, Oxon: Routledge. ISBN 978-1-351-06260-2. OCLC 1037283914.
- Hovannisian, Richard G. (1971). The Republic of Armenia. Vol. 1: The First Year, 1918–1919. Berkeley: University of California Press. ISBN 978-0520019843.
- Кавказский календарь на 1913 год [Caucasian calendar for 1913] (in Russian) (68th ed.). Tiflis: Tipografiya kantselyarii Ye.I.V. na Kavkaze, kazenny dom. 1913. Archived from the original on 19 April 2022.
- Кавказский календарь на 1917 год [Caucasian calendar for 1917] (in Russian) (72nd ed.). Tiflis: Tipografiya kantselyarii Ye.I.V. na Kavkaze, kazenny dom. 1917. Archived from the original on 4 November 2021.
- Tsutsiev, Arthur (2014). Atlas of the Ethno-Political History of the Caucasus (PDF). Translated by Nora Seligman Favorov. New Haven: Yale University Press. ISBN 9780300153088. Archived (PDF) from the original on 17 June 2023.
