= Batalpashinsky otdel =

Coordinates: 44°13′N 42°03′E

Batalpashinsky otdel Баталпашинскій отдѣлъ
- Otdel
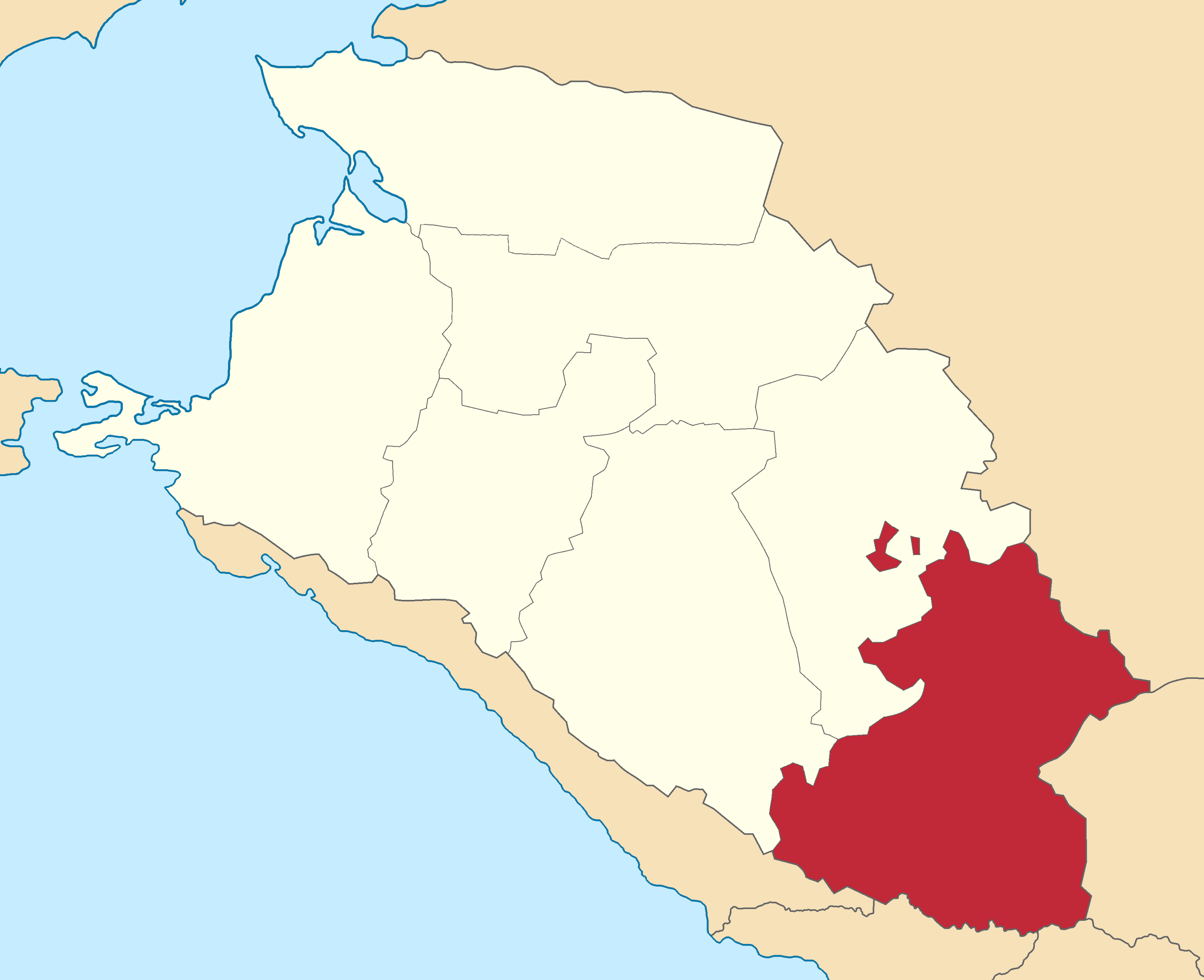
- Location in the Kuban Oblast
- Country: Russian Empire
- Viceroyalty: Caucasus
- Oblast: Kuban
- Established: 1869
- Abolished: 1922
- Capital: Batalpashinskaya (present-day Cherkessk)

Area
  - Total: 17,444.27 km^{2} (6,735.27 sq mi)

Population (1916)
  - Total: 298,208
  - Density: 17.0949/km^{2} (44.2756/sq mi)
  - Rural: 100.00%

The Batalpashinsky otdel (Note: Russian: Баталпаши́нскій отдѣ́лъ, romanized: Batalpashínsky otdél; Ukrainian: Баталпашинський відділ, romanized: Batalpashynskyy viddil) was a Cossack district (otdel) of the Kuban oblast of the Caucasus Viceroyalty of the Russian Empire. It bordered the Stavropol Governorate to the north, the Labinsky and Maykopsky otdels to the west, the Sochi and Sukhumi okrugs to the south, and the Terek Oblast to the east. The area of the Batalpashinsky otdel included most of the contemporary Karachay-Cherkessia region of Russia. The administrative capital was the city of Batalpashinskaya (present-day Cherkessk).

== Administrative divisions ==
The subcounties (uchastoks) of the Batalpashinsky otdel in 1912 were as follows:

| Name | 1912 population |
|---|---|
| 1-y uchastok (1-й участокъ) | 61,259 |
| 2-y uchastok (2-й участокъ) | 72,300 |
| 3-y uchastok (3-й участокъ) | 71,791 |

== Demographics ==
=== Russian Empire Census ===
According to the Russian Empire Census, the Batalpashinsky otdel had a population of 215,400 on 28 January [O.S. 15 January] 1897, including 107,825 men and 107,575 women. The plurality of the population indicated Russian to be their mother tongue, with significant Ukrainian and Karachay speaking minorities.

Linguistic composition of the Batalpashinsky otdel in 1897
| Language | Native speakers | % |
|---|---|---|
| Russian | 90,305 | 41.92 |
| Ukrainian | 58,421 | 27.12 |
| Karachay | 26,867 | 12.47 |
| Abkhaz | 10,370 | 4.81 |
| Kabardian | 8,452 | 3.92 |
| Nogai | 5,746 | 2.67 |
| German | 4,392 | 2.04 |
| Circassian | 3,962 | 1.84 |
| Ossetian | 1,829 | 0.85 |
| Tatar (Note: Before 1918, Azerbaijanis were generally known as "Tatars". This term, employed by the Russians, referred to Turkic-speaking Muslims of the South Caucasus. After 1918, with the establishment of the Azerbaijan Democratic Republic and "especially during the Soviet era", the Tatar group identified itself as "Azerbaijani".) | 1,232 | 0.57 |
| Estonian | 839 | 0.39 |
| Belarusian | 751 | 0.35 |
| Jewish | 530 | 0.25 |
| Greek | 419 | 0.19 |
| Armenian | 380 | 0.18 |
| Polish | 192 | 0.09 |
| Mordovian | 161 | 0.07 |
| Romani | 135 | 0.06 |
| Kumyk | 100 | 0.05 |
| Georgian | 99 | 0.05 |
| Kazi-Kumukh | 47 | 0.02 |
| Romanian | 32 | 0.01 |
| Avar-Andean | 29 | 0.01 |
| Persian | 22 | 0.01 |
| Turkish | 20 | 0.01 |
| Czech | 13 | 0.01 |
| Lithuanian | 5 | 0.00 |
| Bulgarian | 3 | 0.00 |
| Latvian | 3 | 0.00 |
| Bashkir | 2 | 0.00 |
| Other | 42 | 0.02 |
| TOTAL | 215,400 | 100.00 |

=== Kavkazskiy kalendar ===
According to the 1917 publication of Kavkazskiy kalendar, the Batalpashinsky otdel had a population of 298,208 on 14 January [O.S. 1 January] 1916, including 152,171 men and 146,037 women, 208,488 of whom were the permanent population, and 89,720 were temporary residents:

| Nationality | Number | % |
|---|---|---|
| Russians | 209,733 | 70.33 |
| North Caucasians | 77,851 | 26.11 |
| Other Europeans | 5,276 | 1.77 |
| Asiatic Christians | 3,268 | 1.10 |
| Jews | 1,089 | 0.37 |
| Sunni Muslims (Note: Primarily Turco-Tatars.) | 601 | 0.20 |
| Armenians | 390 | 0.13 |
| TOTAL | 298,208 | 100.00 |

== Bibliography ==
- Bournoutian, George A. (2018). Armenia and Imperial Decline: The Yerevan Province, 1900–1914. Milton Park, Abingdon, Oxon: Routledge. ISBN 978-1-351-06260-2. OCLC 1037283914.
- Hovannisian, Richard G. (1971). The Republic of Armenia. Vol. 1: The First Year, 1918–1919. Berkeley: University of California Press. ISBN 978-0520019843.
- Кавказский календарь на 1913 год [Caucasian calendar for 1913] (in Russian) (68th ed.). Tiflis: Tipografiya kantselyarii Ye.I.V. na Kavkaze, kazenny dom. 1913. Archived from the original on 19 April 2022.
- Кавказский календарь на 1917 год [Caucasian calendar for 1917] (in Russian) (72nd ed.). Tiflis: Tipografiya kantselyarii Ye.I.V. na Kavkaze, kazenny dom. 1917. Archived from the original on 4 November 2021.
- Tsutsiev, Arthur (2014). Atlas of the Ethno-Political History of the Caucasus (PDF). Translated by Nora Seligman Favorov. New Haven: Yale University Press. ISBN 9780300153088. Archived (PDF) from the original on 17 June 2023.
