= Yekaterinodarsky otdel =

Coordinates: 45°02′N 38°58′E

Yekaterinodarsky otdel Екатеринодарскій отдѣлъ
- Otdel
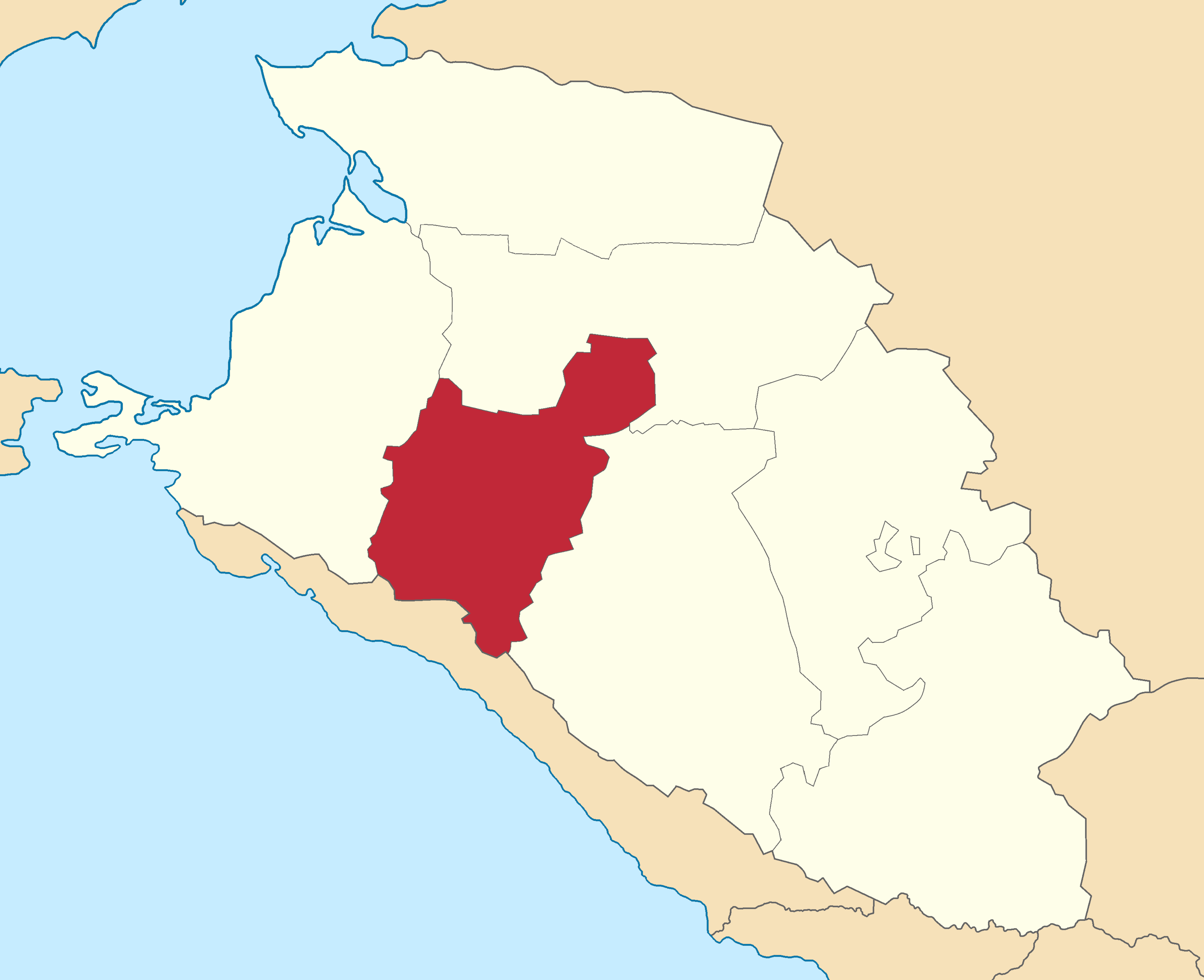
- Location in the Kuban Oblast
- Country: Russian Empire
- Viceroyalty: Caucasus
- Oblast: Kuban
- Established: 1869
- Abolished: 1924
- Capital: Yekaterinodar (present-day Krasnodar)

Area
  - Total: 8,373.61 km^{2} (3,233.07 sq mi)

Population (1916)
  - Total: 371,788
  - Density: 44.4000/km^{2} (114.995/sq mi)
  - Urban: 27.87%
  - Rural: 72.13%

The Yekaterinodarsky otdel (Note: Russian: Екатеринода́рскій отдѣ́лъ, romanized: Yekaterinodársky otdél; Ukrainian: Катеринодарський відділ, romanized: Katerynodarskyy viddil) was a Cossack district (otdel) of the Kuban oblast of the Caucasus Viceroyalty of the Russian Empire. It bordered the Kavkazsky otdel to the north, the Tamansky otdel to the west, the Black Sea Governorate to the south, and the Maykopsky otdel to the east. The area of the Yekaterinodar otdel mostly corresponded to the contemporary Krasnodar Krai region of Russia. The district was eponymously named for its administrative center, Yekaterinodar (present-day Krasnodar).

== Administrative divisions ==
The subcounties (uchastoks) of the Yekaterinodarsky otdel in 1912 were as follows:

Name	1912 population
1-y uchastok (1-й участокъ)	82,661
2-y uchastok (2-й участокъ)	59,843
3-y uchastok (3-й участокъ)	32,407

== Demographics ==
=== Russian Empire Census ===
According to the Russian Empire Census, the Yekaterinodarsky otdel had a population of 245,173 on 28 January [O.S. 15 January] 1897, including 125,832 men and 119,341 women. The majority of the population indicated Ukrainian to be their mother tongue, with significant Russian and Circassian speaking minorities.

Linguistic composition of the Yekaterindarsky otdel in 1897
Language	Native speakers	%
Ukrainian	126,941	51.78
Russian	83,751	34.16
Circassian	19,851	8.10
Greek	3,476	1.42
Armenian	2,807	1.14
German	1,481	0.60
Belarusian	1,328	0.54
Romanian	1,056	0.43
Polish	809	0.33
Turkish	935	0.38
Jewish	524	0.21
Tatar (Note: Before 1918, Azerbaijanis were generally known as "Tatars". This term, employed by the Russians, referred to Turkic-speaking Muslims of the South Caucasus. After 1918, with the establishment of the Azerbaijan Democratic Republic and "especially during the Soviet era", the Tatar group identified itself as "Azerbaijani".)	411	0.17
Mordovian	356	0.15
Romani	248	0.10
Georgian	179	0.07
Czech	177	0.07
Kyurin	158	0.06
Lithuanian	126	0.05
Bashkir	110	0.04
Persian	94	0.04
Kumyk	42	0.02
Ossetian	41	0.02
Avar-Andean	30	0.01
Latvian	28	0.01
Kazi-Kumukh	24	0.01
Bulgarian	22	0.01
Estonian	9	0.00
Kalmyk	5	0.00
Kabardian	3	0.00
Karachay	3	0.00
Nogai	3	0.00
Other	145	0.06
TOTAL	245,173	100.00

=== Kavkazskiy kalendar ===
According to the 1917 publication of Kavkazskiy kalendar, the Yekaterinodarsky otdel had a population of 371,788 on 14 January [O.S. 1 January] 1916, including 187,407 men and 184,381 women, 247,739 of whom were the permanent population, and 124,049 were temporary residents:

Nationality	Urban		Rural		TOTAL	
Nationality	Number	%	Number	%	Number	%
Russians	88,508	85.41	236,408	88.16	324,916	87.39
North Caucasians	300	0.29	28,410	10.59	28,710	7.72
Armenians	5,900	5.69	2,520	0.94	8,420	2.26
Other Europeans	5,963	5.75	816	0.30	6,779	1.82
Sunni Muslims (Note: Primarily Turco-Tatars.)	1,084	1.05	0	0.00	1,084	0.29
Georgians	708	0.68	0	0.00	708	0.19
Jews	462	0.45	10	0.00	472	0.13
Asiatic Christians	385	0.37	0	0.00	385	0.10
Roma	269	0.26	0	0.00	269	0.07
Kurds	45	0.04	0	0.00	45	0.01
TOTAL	103,624	100.00	268,164	100.00	371,788	100.00

== Bibliography ==
- Bournoutian, George A. (2018). Armenia and Imperial Decline: The Yerevan Province, 1900–1914. Milton Park, Abingdon, Oxon: Routledge. ISBN 978-1-351-06260-2. OCLC 1037283914.
- Hovannisian, Richard G. (1971). The Republic of Armenia. Vol. 1: The First Year, 1918–1919. Berkeley: University of California Press. ISBN 978-0520019843.
- Кавказский календарь на 1913 год [Caucasian calendar for 1913] (in Russian) (68th ed.). Tiflis: Tipografiya kantselyarii Ye.I.V. na Kavkaze, kazenny dom. 1913. Archived from the original on 19 April 2022.
- Кавказский календарь на 1917 год [Caucasian calendar for 1917] (in Russian) (72nd ed.). Tiflis: Tipografiya kantselyarii Ye.I.V. na Kavkaze, kazenny dom. 1917. Archived from the original on 4 November 2021.
- Tsutsiev, Arthur (2014). Atlas of the Ethno-Political History of the Caucasus (PDF). Translated by Nora Seligman Favorov. New Haven: Yale University Press. ISBN 9780300153088. Archived (PDF) from the original on 17 June 2023.
