= Yeysky otdel =

Coordinates: 46°19′N 39°23′E

Yeysky otdel Ейскій отдѣлъ
- Otdel
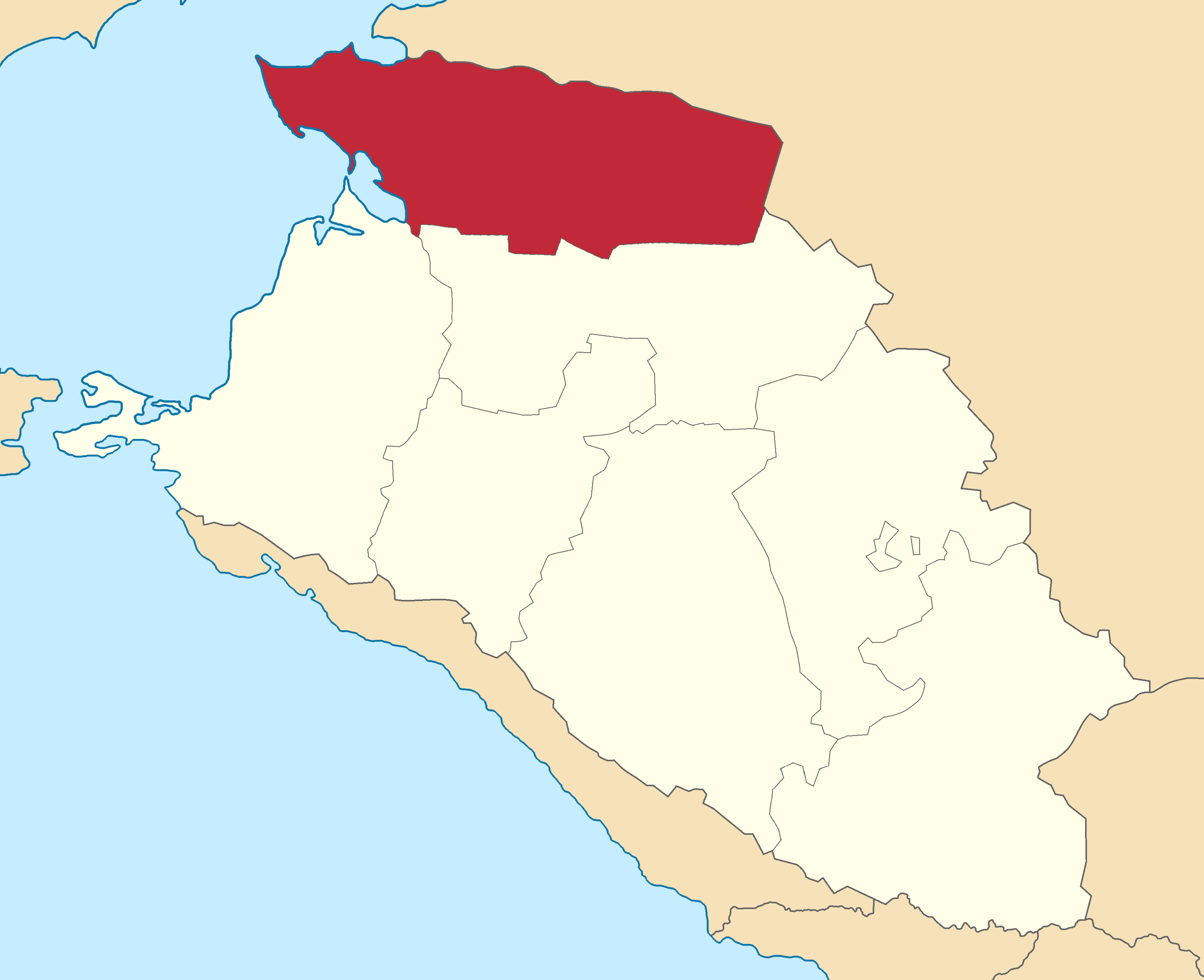
- Location in the Kuban Oblast
- Country: Russian Empire
- Viceroyalty: Caucasus
- Oblast: Kuban
- Established: 1869
- Abolished: 1924
- Capital: Umanskaya (present-day Leningradskaya)

Area
  - Total: 13,802.24 km^{2} (5,329.07 sq mi)

Population (1916)
  - Total: 384,846
  - Density: 27.8829/km^{2} (72.2163/sq mi)
  - Urban: 11.63%
  - Rural: 88.37%

The Yeysky otdel (Note: Russian: Е́йскій отдѣ́лъ, romanized: Yéysky otdél; Ukrainian: Єйський відділ, romanized: Yeyskyy viddil) was a Cossack district (otdel) of the Kuban oblast of the Caucasus Viceroyalty of the Russian Empire. It bordered the Don Host Oblast to the north, the Black Sea to the west, the Kavkazsky otdel to the south, and the Stavropol Governorate to the east. The area of the Yeysky otdel included most of the contemporary Krasnodar Krai region of Russia. The administrative capital was the city of Umanskaya (present-day Leningradskaya).

== Administrative divisions ==
The subcounties (uchastoks) of the Yeysky otdel in 1912 were as follows:

Name	1912 population
1-y uchastok (1-й участокъ)	75,450
2-y uchastok (2-й участокъ)	100,354
3-y uchastok (3-й участокъ)	72,463

== Demographics ==
=== Russian Empire Census ===
According to the Russian Empire Census, the Yeysky otdel had a population of 277,300 on 28 January [O.S. 15 January] 1897, including 140,344 men and 136,956 women. The majority of the population indicated Ukrainian to be their mother tongue, with a significant Russian speaking minority.

Linguistic composition of the Yeysky otdel in 1897
Language	Native speakers	%
Ukrainian	205,063	73.95
Russian	65,449	23.60
German	1,952	0.70
Belarusian	1,303	0.47
Armenian	936	0.34
Latvian	702	0.25
Tatar (Note: Before 1918, Azerbaijanis were generally known as "Tatars". This term, employed by the Russians, referred to Turkic-speaking Muslims of the South Caucasus. After 1918, with the establishment of the Azerbaijan Democratic Republic and "especially during the Soviet era", the Tatar group identified itself as "Azerbaijani".)	508	0.18
Polish	295	0.11
Romani	285	0.10
Kalmyk	208	0.08
Greek	198	0.07
Georgian	84	0.03
Turkish	78	0.03
Jewish	76	0.03
Czech	30	0.01
Lithuanian	23	0.01
Avar-Andean	14	0.01
Romanian	14	0.01
Bulgarian	11	0.00
Mordovian	11	0.00
Persian	9	0.00
Kyurin	8	0.00
Kabardian	6	0.00
Bashkir	4	0.00
Kumyk	2	0.00
Ossetian	2	0.00
Circassian	1	0.00
Estonian	1	0.00
Other	27	0.01
TOTAL	277,300	100.00

=== Kavkazskiy kalendar ===
According to the 1917 publication of Kavkazskiy kalendar, the Yeysky otdel had a population of 384,846 on 14 January [O.S. 1 January] 1916, including 191,196 men and 193,650 women, 360,038 of whom were the permanent population, and 24,808 were temporary residents:

Nationality	Urban		Rural		TOTAL	
Nationality	Number	%	Number	%	Number	%
Russians	43,950	98.18	338,119	99.42	382,069	99.28
Other Europeans	252	0.56	1,378	0.41	1,630	0.42
Armenians	381	0.85	389	0.11	770	0.20
Shia Muslims (Note: Primarily Tatars.)	86	0.19	86	0.03	172	0.04
Sunni Muslims (Note: Primarily Turco-Tatars.)	60	0.13	60	0.02	120	0.03
Jews	36	0.08	35	0.01	71	0.02
North Caucasians	0	0.00	8	0.00	8	0.00
Roma	0	0.00	6	0.00	6	0.00
TOTAL	44,765	100.00	340,081	100.00	384,846	100.00

== Bibliography ==
- Bournoutian, George A. (2018). Armenia and Imperial Decline: The Yerevan Province, 1900–1914. Milton Park, Abingdon, Oxon: Routledge. ISBN 978-1-351-06260-2. OCLC 1037283914.
- Hovannisian, Richard G. (1971). The Republic of Armenia. Vol. 1: The First Year, 1918–1919. Berkeley: University of California Press. ISBN 978-0520019843.
- Кавказский календарь на 1913 год [Caucasian calendar for 1913] (in Russian) (68th ed.). Tiflis: Tipografiya kantselyarii Ye.I.V. na Kavkaze, kazenny dom. 1913. Archived from the original on 19 April 2022.
- Кавказский календарь на 1917 год [Caucasian calendar for 1917] (in Russian) (72nd ed.). Tiflis: Tipografiya kantselyarii Ye.I.V. na Kavkaze, kazenny dom. 1917. Archived from the original on 4 November 2021.
- Tsutsiev, Arthur (2014). Atlas of the Ethno-Political History of the Caucasus (PDF). Translated by Nora Seligman Favorov. New Haven: Yale University Press. ISBN 9780300153088. Archived (PDF) from the original on 17 June 2023.
