= Maykopsky otdel =

Coordinates: 44°36′N 40°05′E

Maykopsky otdel Майкопскій отдѣлъ
- Otdel
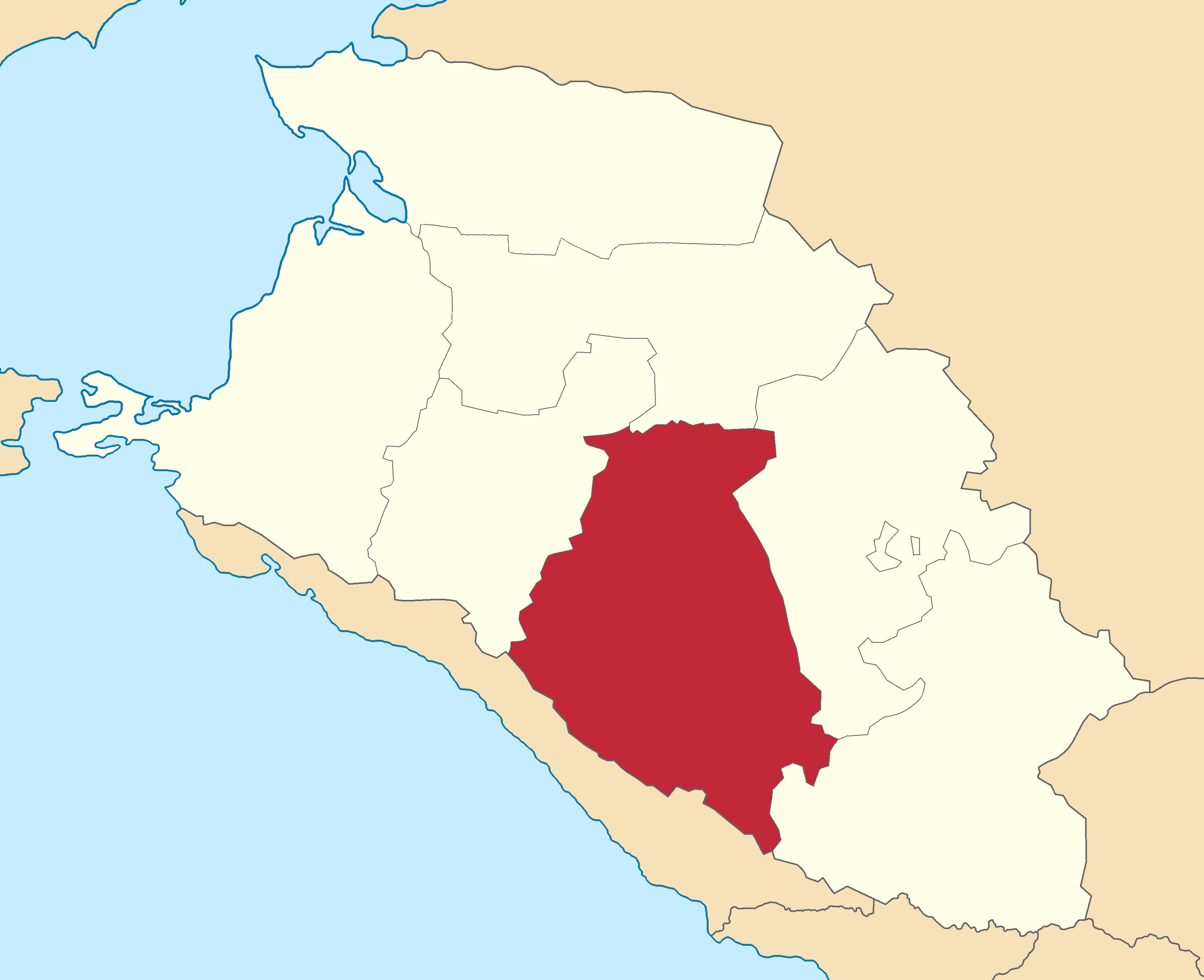
- Location in the Kuban Oblast
- Country: Russian Empire
- Viceroyalty: Caucasus
- Oblast: Kuban
- Established: 1869
- Abolished: 1924
- Capital: Maykop

Area
  - Total: 16,428.79 km^{2} (6,343.19 sq mi)

Population (1916)
  - Total: 468,453
  - Density: 28.5142/km^{2} (73.8513/sq mi)
  - Urban: 11.69%
  - Rural: 88.31%

The Maykopsky otdel (Note: Russian: Майко́пскій отдѣ́лъ, romanized: Maykópsky otdél; Ukrainian: Майкопський відділ, romanized: Maykopskyy viddil) was a district (otdel - literally "department") of the Kuban oblast of the Caucasus Viceroyalty of the Russian Empire. It bordered the Kavkazsky otdel to the north, the Yekaterinodarsky otdel to the west, the Black Sea Governorate to the south, and the Labinsky and Batalpashinsky otdels to the east. The area of the Maykopsky otdel mostly corresponded to Adygea within Russia. The district was eponymously named for its administrative center, Maykop.

== Administrative divisions ==
The subcounties (uchastoks) of the Maykopsky otdel in 1912 were as follows:

Name	1912 population
1-y uchastok (1-й участокъ)	50,811
2-y uchastok (2-й участокъ)	55,927
3-y uchastok (3-й участокъ)	68,841
4-y uchastok (4-й участокъ)	31,570

== Demographics ==
=== Russian Empire Census ===
According to the Russian Empire Census, the Maykopsky otdel had a population of 283,117 on 28 January [O.S. 15 January] 1897, including 143,979 men and 139,138 women. The majority of the population indicated Russian to be their mother tongue, with a significant Ukrainian speaking minority.

Linguistic composition of the Maykopsky otdel in 1897
Language	Native speakers	%
Great-Russian (Russian)	161,230	56.95
Little-Russian (Ukrainian)	88,588	31.29
Circassian	13,892	4.91
Kabardian	5,851	2.07
White-Russian (Belarusian)	3,573	1.26
Abkhaz	2,101	0.74
Armenian	1,835	0.65
Greek	1,597	0.56
German	776	0.27
Mordovian	754	0.27
Tatar (Note: Before 1918, Azerbaijanis were generally known as "Tatars". This term, employed by the Russians, referred to Turkic-speaking Muslims of the South Caucasus. After 1918, with the establishment of the Azerbaijan Democratic Republic and "especially during the Soviet era", the Tatar group identified itself as "Azerbaijani".)	629	0.22
Jewish	486	0.17
Polish	356	0.13
Romani	268	0.09
Turkish	258	0.09
Czech	201	0.07
Romanian	193	0.07
Georgian	146	0.05
Nogai	67	0.02
Kazi-Kumukh	48	0.02
Bulgarian	41	0.01
Kumyk	39	0.01
Persian	39	0.01
Lithuanian	25	0.01
Kyurin	16	0.01
Bashkir	14	0.00
Avar-Andean	9	0.00
Ossetian	9	0.00
Kalmyk	8	0.00
Estonian	3	0.00
Karachay	2	0.00
Other	63	0.02
TOTAL	283,117	100.00

=== Kavkazskiy kalendar ===
According to the 1917 publication of Kavkazskiy kalendar, the Maykopsky otdel had a population of 468,453 on 14 January [O.S. 1 January] 1916, including 235,003 men and 233,450 women, 238,783 of whom were the permanent population, and 229,670 were temporary residents:

Nationality	Urban		Rural		TOTAL	
Nationality	Number	%	Number	%	Number	%
Russians	52,776	96.37	382,235	92.40	435,011	92.86
North Caucasians	145	0.26	25,080	6.06	25,225	5.38
Sunni Muslims (Note: Primarily Turco-Tatars.)	0	0.00	4,629	1.12	4,629	0.99
Armenians	631	1.15	1,090	0.26	1,721	0.37
Other Europeans	693	1.27	657	0.16	1,350	0.29
Jews	459	0.84	0	0.00	459	0.10
Georgians	58	0.11	0	0.00	58	0.01
TOTAL	54,762	100.00	413,691	100.00	468,453	100.00

== Bibliography ==
- Bournoutian, George A. (2018). Armenia and Imperial Decline: The Yerevan Province, 1900–1914. Milton Park, Abingdon, Oxon: Routledge. ISBN 978-1-351-06260-2. OCLC 1037283914.
- Hovannisian, Richard G. (1971). The Republic of Armenia. Vol. 1: The First Year, 1918–1919. Berkeley: University of California Press. ISBN 978-0520019843.
- Кавказский календарь на 1913 год [Caucasian calendar for 1913] (in Russian) (68th ed.). Tiflis: Tipografiya kantselyarii Ye.I.V. na Kavkaze, kazenny dom. 1913. Archived from the original on 19 April 2022.
- Кавказский календарь на 1917 год [Caucasian calendar for 1917] (in Russian) (72nd ed.). Tiflis: Tipografiya kantselyarii Ye.I.V. na Kavkaze, kazenny dom. 1917. Archived from the original on 4 November 2021.
- Tsutsiev, Arthur (2014). Atlas of the Ethno-Political History of the Caucasus (PDF). Translated by Nora Seligman Favorov. New Haven: Yale University Press. ISBN 9780300153088. Archived (PDF) from the original on 17 June 2023.
