= Cherkessk =

City in the Karachay-Cherkess Republic, Russia

Cherkessk Черкесск
- City
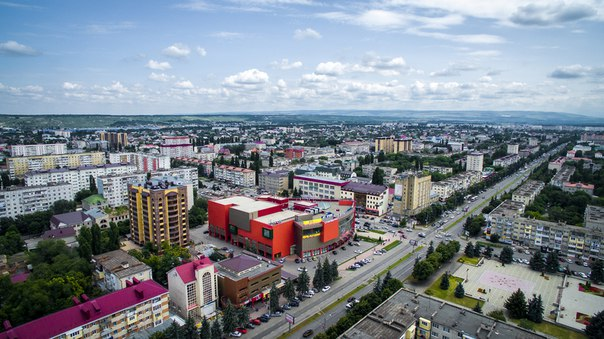
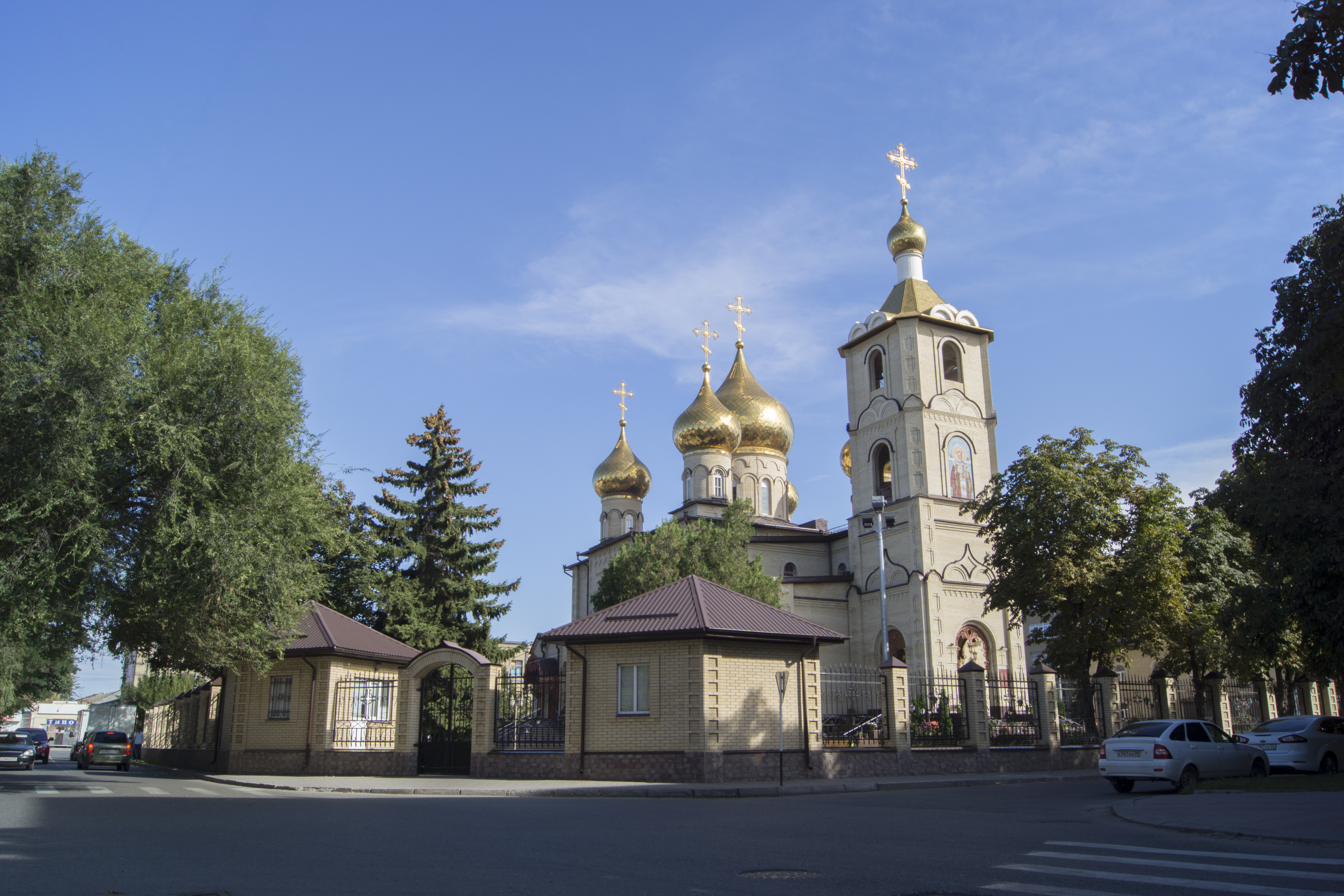
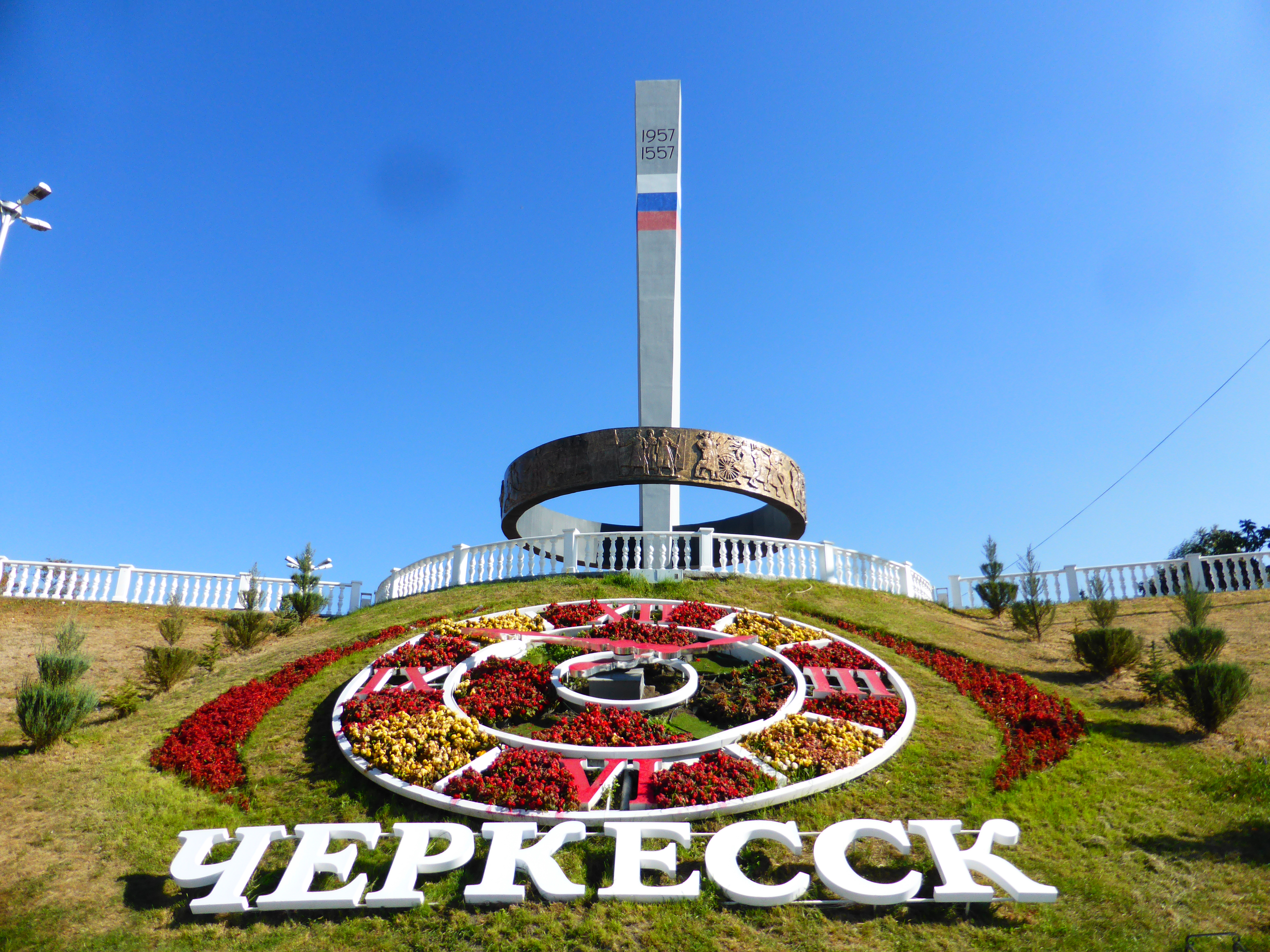
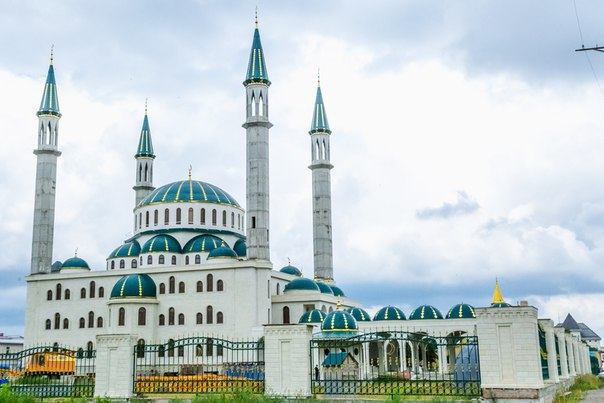
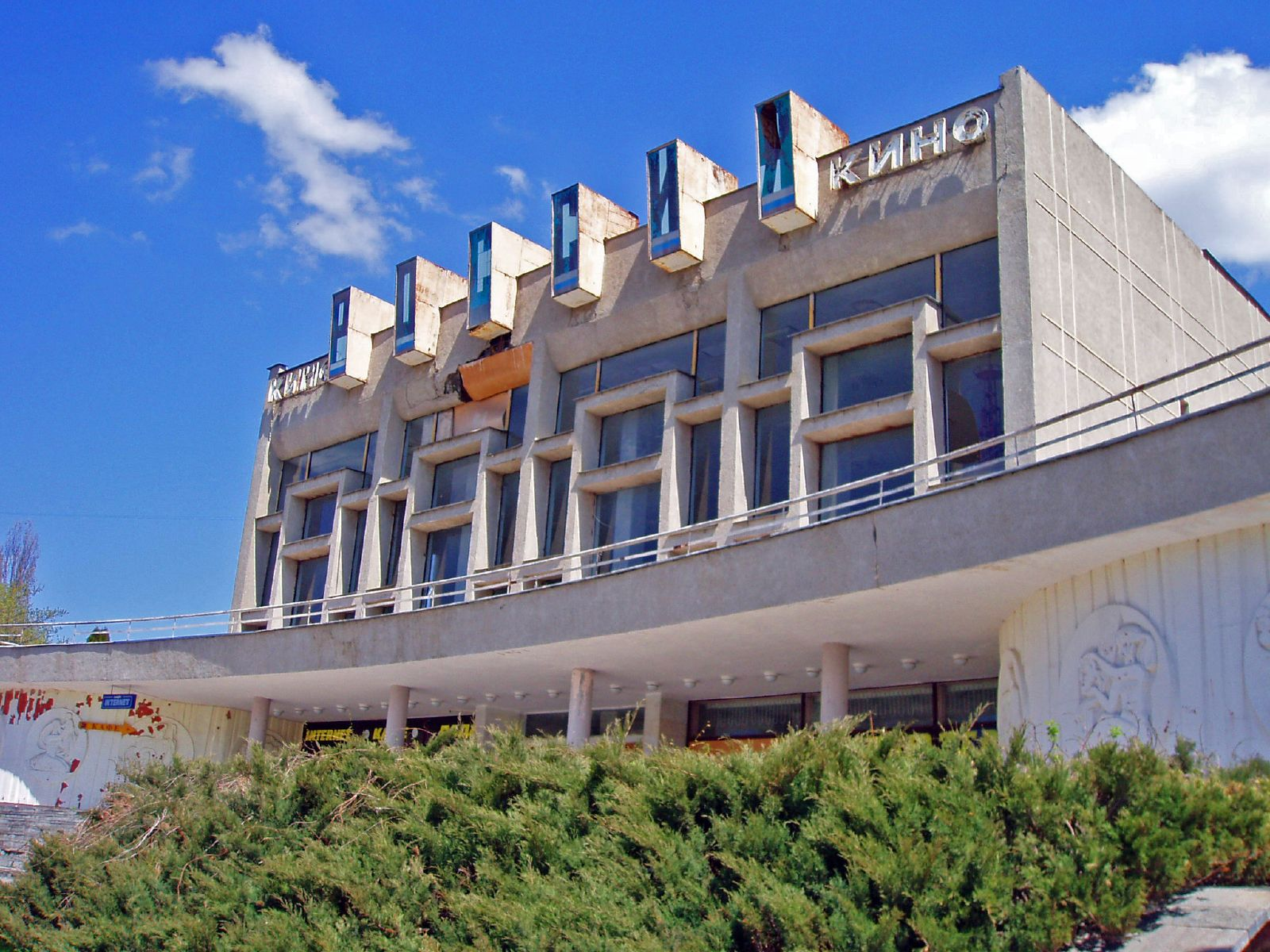
- From the top to bottom-right, Aerial view of the City, Saint Nicholas Cathedral, Friendship Monument, Central Mosque, Soviet-Era Cinema Building

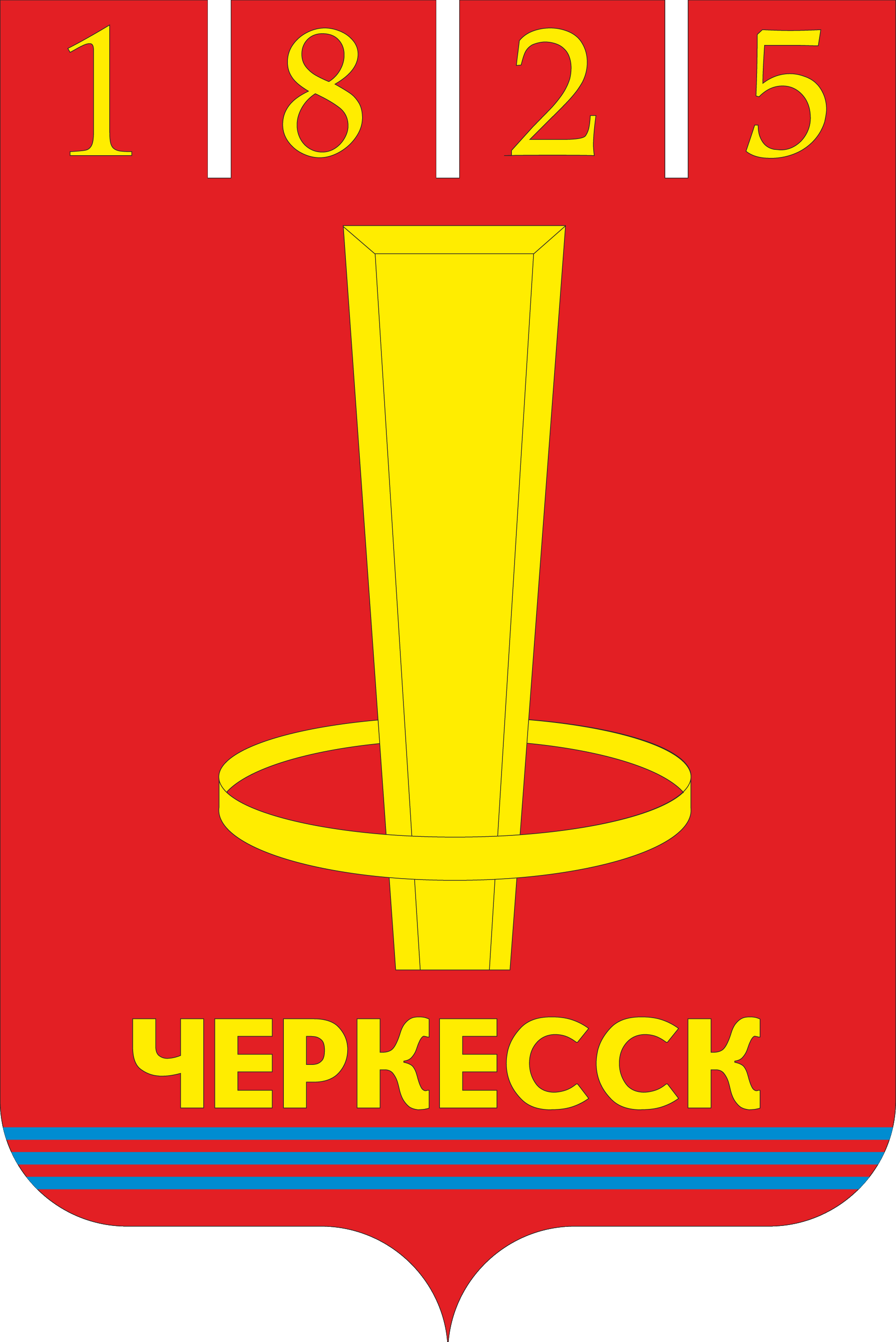
- Coat of arms
- Interactive map of Cherkessk
- Location of Cherkessk Cherkessk (European Russia) Cherkessk (Russia) Cherkessk (Europe)
- Coordinates: 44°13′N 42°03′E
- Country: Russia
- Federal subject: Karachay-Cherkessia
- Founded: 1825
- City status since: 1931

Government
  - Mayor: Alexey Baskaev

Area
  - Total: 69.8 km^{2} (26.9 sq mi)
- Elevation: 530 m (1,740 ft)

Population (2010 Census)
  - Total: 129,069
  - Estimate (1 January 2021): 123,100 (−4.6%)
  - Rank: 127th in 2010
  - Density: 1,849.12/km^{2} (4,789.2/sq mi)

Administrative status
  - Subordinated to: city of republic significance of Cherkessk
  - Capital of: Karachay-Cherkess Republic
  - Capital of: city of republic significance of Cherkessk

Municipal status
  - Urban okrug: Cherkessk Urban Okrug
  - Capital of: Cherkessk Urban Okrug
- Time zone: UTC+3 (MSK)
- Postal code: 3690XX
- Dialing code: +7 8782
- OKTMO ID: 91701000001
- Website: cherkessk09.ru

Cherkessk (Russian: Черке́сск; Adyghe: Шэрджэс къалэ; Kabardian: Черкес-къалэ) is the capital city of Karachay-Cherkessia, Russia, as well as its political, economic, and cultural center. Population: 129,069 (2010 census). 112,782 (2024).

It was previously known as Batalpashinskaya (until 1931), Batalpashinsk (until 1934), Sulimov (until 1937), Yezhovo-Cherkessk (until 1939).

== Names ==
In Russian, the city is called Черке́сск (Čerkessk) and has similar names in the languages of the city's other major ethnic groups. In Karachay, it is Черкесск (Çerkessk) or Черкесск шахар (Çerkessk şahar); in Kabardian, it is Шэрджэс къалэ (Şărdjăs qală) or Черке́сск (Čerkessk); in Abaza, it is Черкес къала (Čerkes q̇ala) or Черкесск (Čerkessk); in Nogai, it is Шеркеш шахар (Şerkeş şahar) and in Chechen, it is Черкесск (Čerkessk).

For its first century of existence, Cherkessk was a stanitsa, a village inside a Cossack host, which from 1825 to 1931 was named Batalpashinskaya stanitsa (Russian: Баталпашинская станица Batalpašinskaja stanica) and nicknamed Pashinka (Пашинка Pašinka) In 1931, it was renamed Batalpashinsk (Баталпашинск Batałpašinsk), and then in quick succession Sulimov (Сулимов Sulimov) in 1934 for Daniil Sulimov, Chairman of the Council of People's Commissars of the Russian SFSR, and following Sulimov's execution in the Great Purge, Yezhovo-Cherkessk (Ежово-Черкесск Ježovo-Čerkessk) in 1937 for Nikolai Yezhov, head of the NKVD. With Yezhov's arrest, the initial "Yezhovo-" was dropped, and the city received its present name in 1939.

== History ==
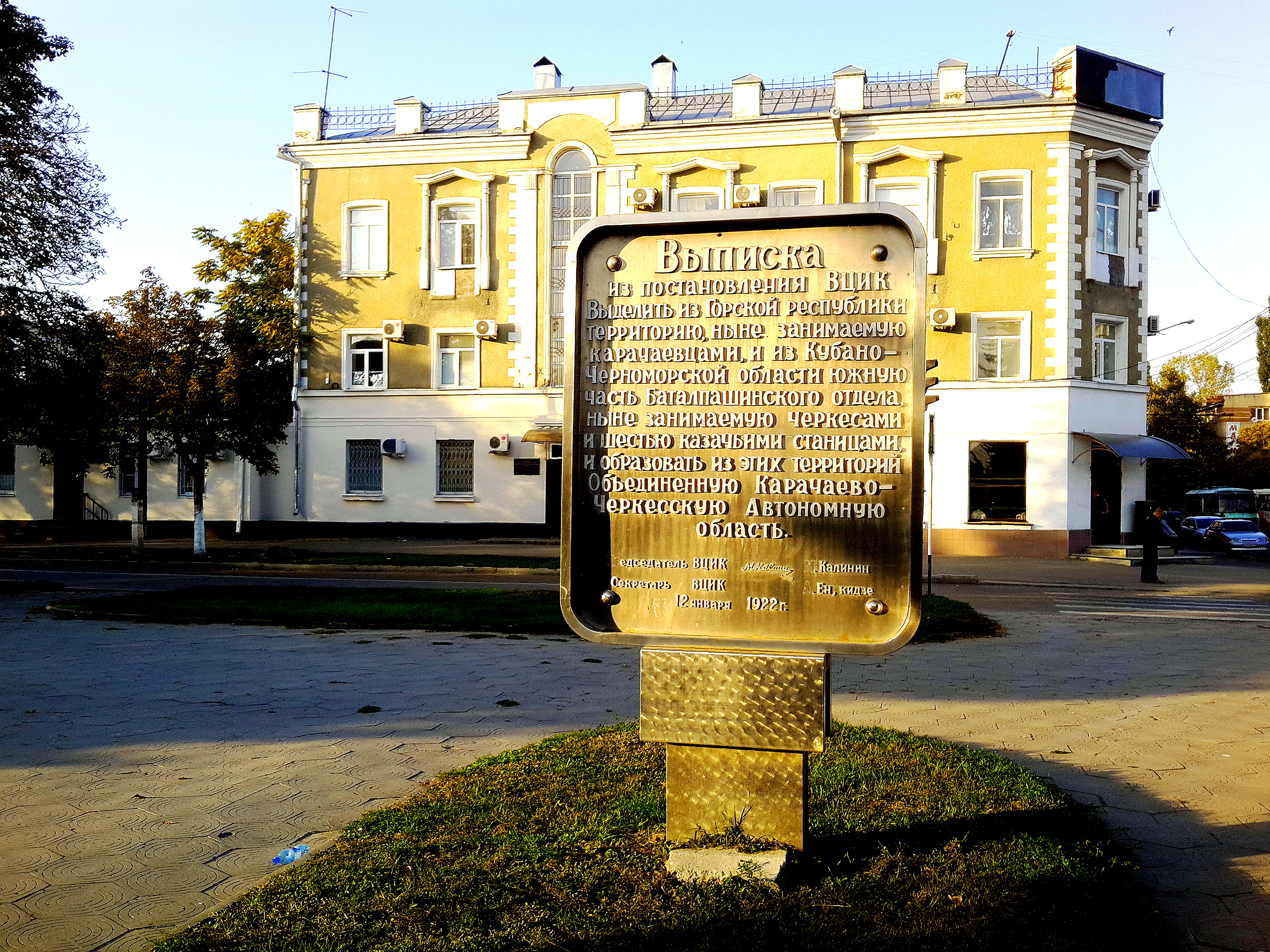
Extract from the decree of the All-Russian Central Executive Committee

What is now Cherkessk was established in 1804 as a Russian military fort on the Kuban River, what was then the border with Circassia, on the spot where in 1790 Russian troops under the command of General Johann Hermann von Fersen (Ivan Ivanovich Herman fon Fersen) defeated the Ottoman Batal Pasha. In honor of the victory over Batal Pasha, the fort was named Batalpashinskaya; it was a redoubt surrounded by an earthen rampart and ditch. (That the fort was named for an enemy leader may have led villagers to prefer the nickname Pashinka.)

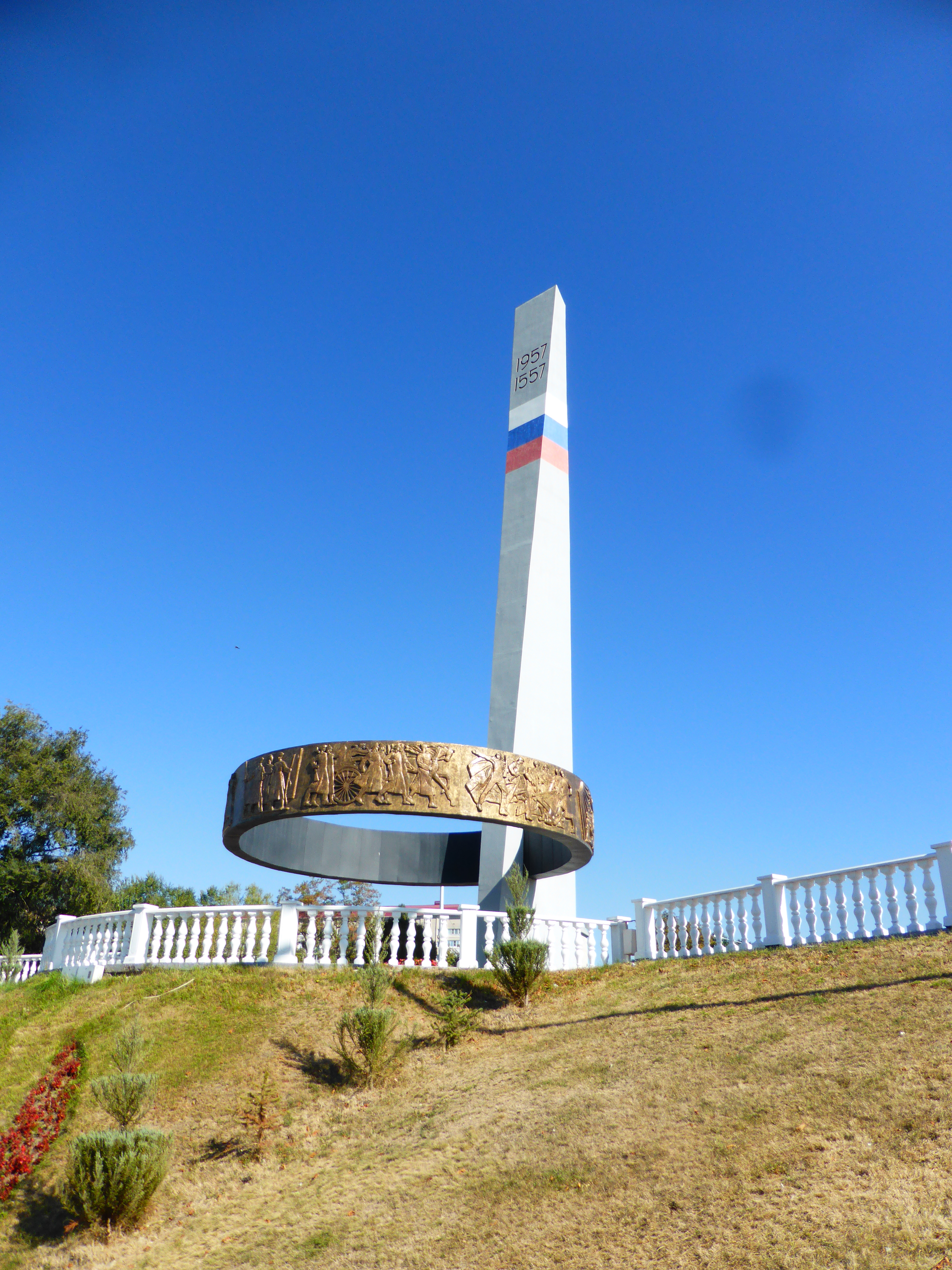
Friendship of the People's Monument

The settlement itself was founded as the Cossack stanitsa of Batalpashinskaya near the Russian Army outpost. The officially recognized year of founding of Batalpashinskaya and modern Cherkessk is 1825. However, the Cossack settlers from the Khopyour and Kuban regiments began arriving in the newly organized stanitsa not earlier than spring of 1826. In 1860, the village was designated as the administrative center of the Batalpashinsky Otdel of the Kuban Oblast. A decree of 30 December 1869 by Tsar Alexander II transformed the village into a city of Batalpashinsk but the decree was never implemented, and Batalpashinskaya remained a stanitsa until the Soviet times. In 1888, the village became a seat of one of Kuban's seven departments.

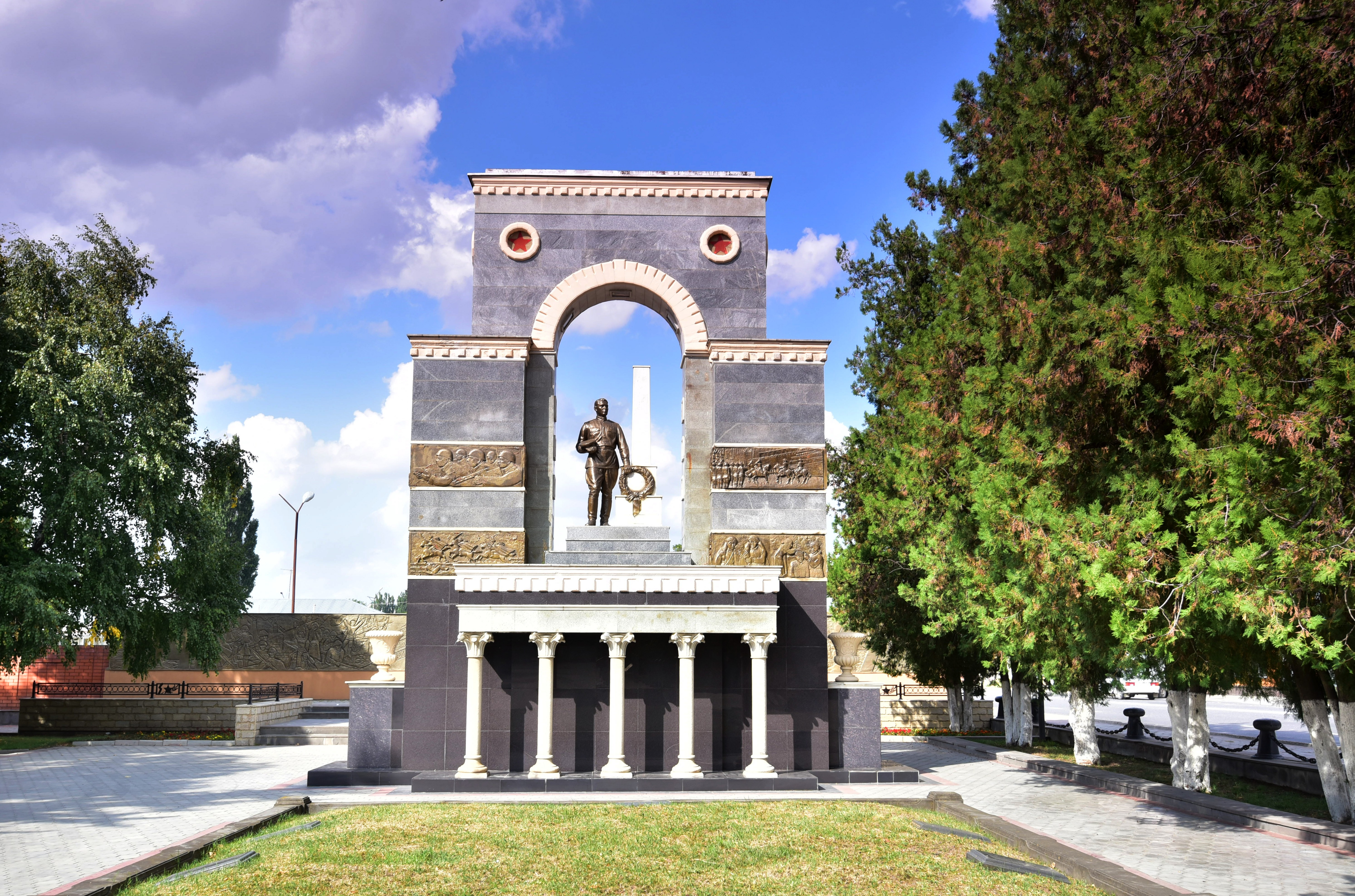
Monument to the Soviet Soldiers of Cherkessk

In 1922, the village became the seat of the Karachay-Cherkess Autonomous Oblast of the RSFSR, and in 1926, the Cherkess National Okrug. In 1931, it was granted town status and renamed Batalpashinsk. It received its current name of Cherkessk in 1939. The city was occupied by the Nazi German Wehrmacht during World War II (the Eastern Front) from 11 August 1942 to 17 January 1943 as part of the Case Blue offensive. In 1957, it became the capital of the reformed Karachay-Cherkess Autonomous Oblast which became the Karachay–Cherkess Republic in 1991 with the fall of the Soviet Union.

== Administrative and municipal status ==
Cherkessk is the capital of the republic. Within the framework of administrative divisions, it is incorporated as the city of republic significance of Cherkessk—an administrative unit with the status equal to that of the districts. As a municipal division, the city of republic significance of Cherkessk is incorporated as Cherkessk Urban Okrug.

== Population ==
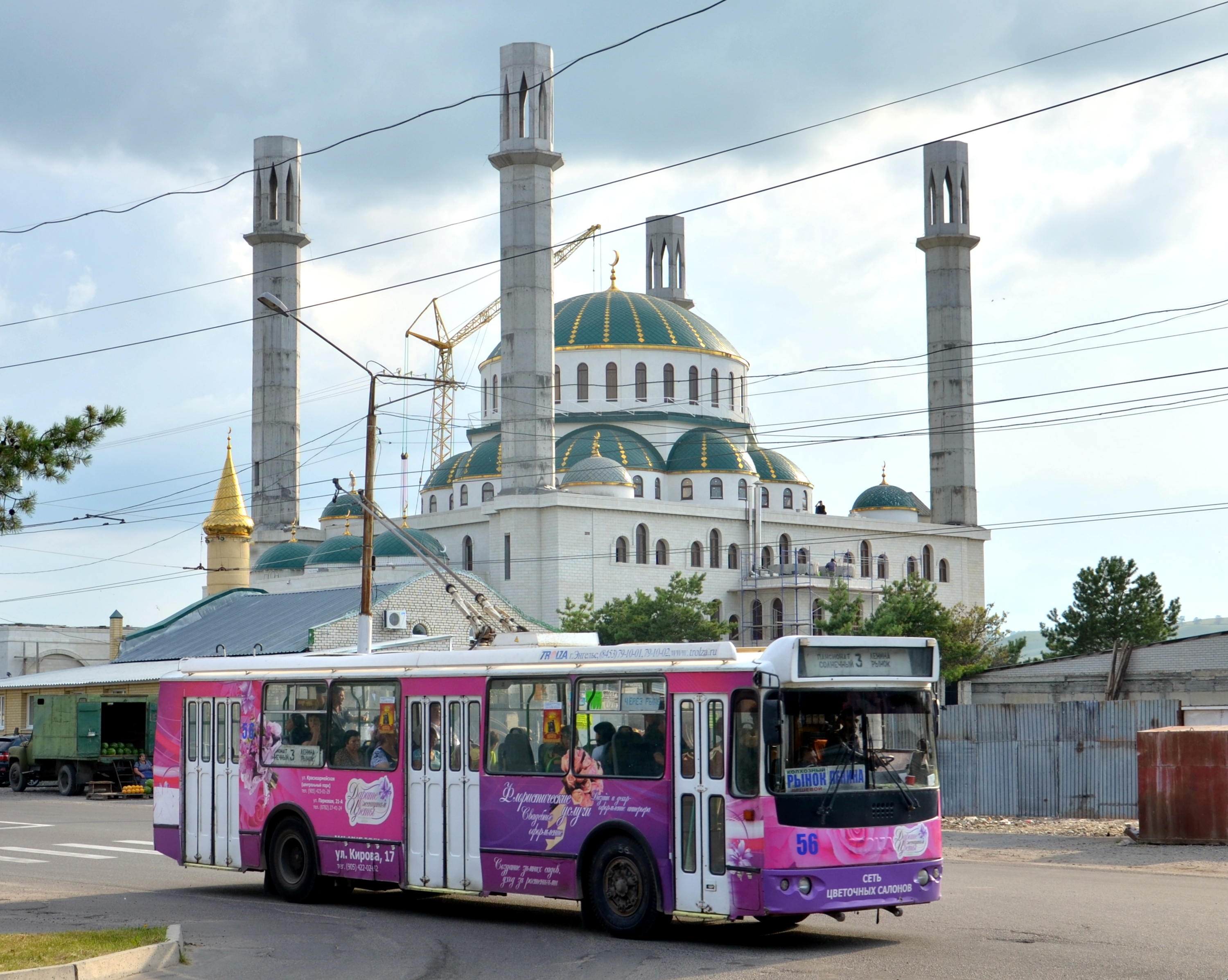
Cherkessk Mosque under construction

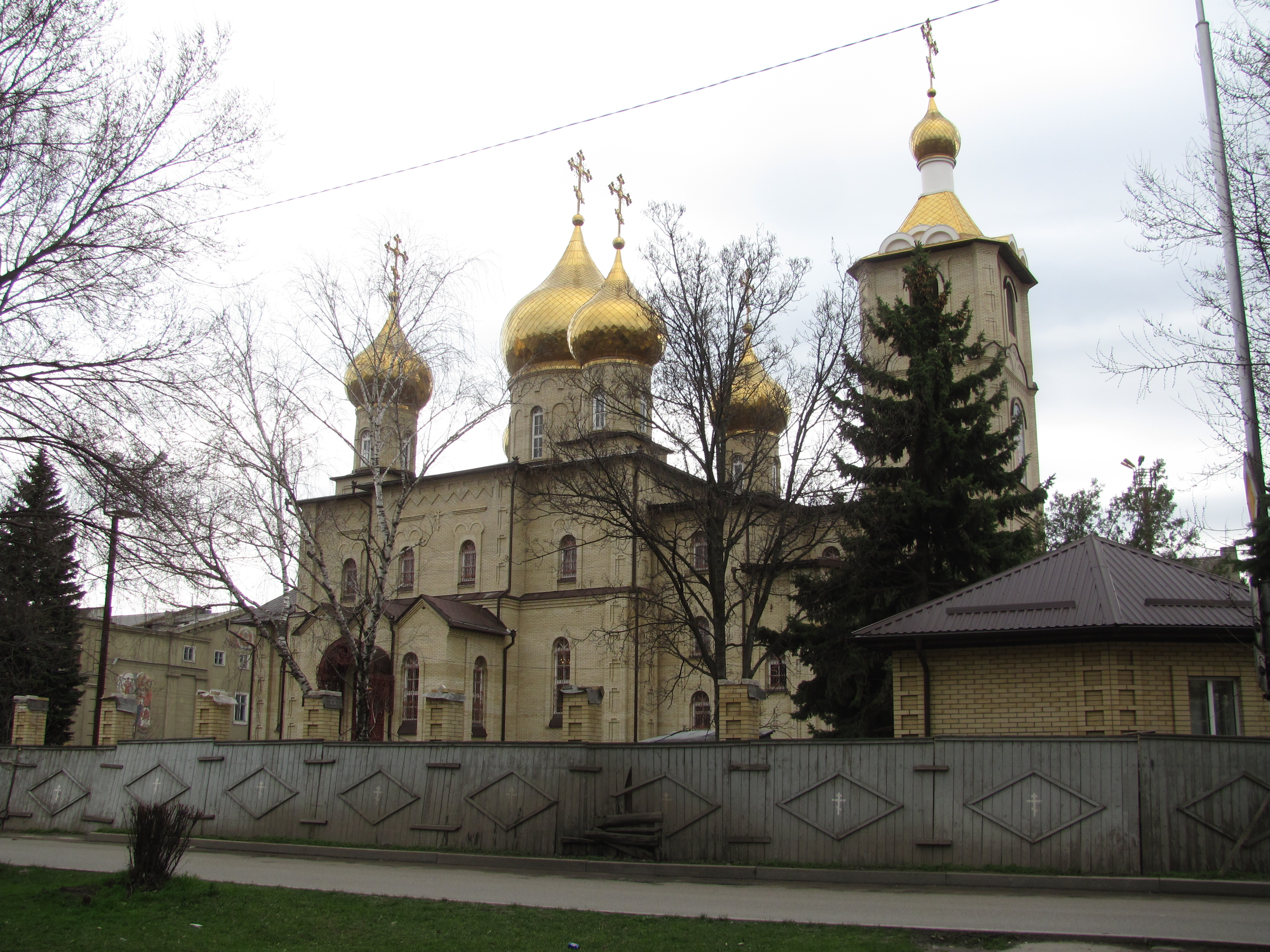
St. Nicholas Cathedral, Cherkessk

The population of Cherkessk was 129,069 in the 2010 Census, 116,244 in the 2002 Census and 113,060 in the 1989 Soviet Census.

=== Ethnic groups ===
The city is inhabited by Russians, native Cherkess (Circassians), Karachays, Abaza, Nogays and minorities of Ukrainians, Greeks and Armenians.

==== 1926 ====
According to the First All-Union Census of the Soviet Union of 1926, inhabitants of Batalpashinsk (present-day Cherkessk) included:

- Russians (82.7%)
- Ukrainians (9.0%)
- Karachays (0.8%)
- Greeks (Pontic Greeks) (0.2%)

==== 1939 ====
The 1937 census results were suppressed and destroyed but the Soviet census of 1939 recorded:

- Russians (87.6%)
- Ukrainians (3.6%)
- Abazin (1.5%)
- Adyghes (i.e. Circassian) (1.4%)
- Karachays (0.8%)
- Ossetians (0.5%)
- Nogais (0.5%)
- Greeks (0.5%)

==== 1959 ====
The Soviet census of 1959 recorded:

- Russians (87.7%)
- Ukrainians (2.8%)
- Circassian (2.1%)
- Abazins (1.8%)
- Karachays (1.6%)
- Nogais (0.4%)
- Greeks (0.4%)
- Ossetians (0.4%)

==== 1970 ====
The Soviet census of 1970 recorded:

- Russians (74.5%)
- Circassian (6.4%)
- Karachays (6.2%)
- Abazins (5.0%)
- Ukrainians (2.1%)
- Nogais (1.0%)
- Greeks (0.5%)
- Ossetians (0.5%)

==== 1989 ====
According to the 1989 data from the final Soviet census, the population of the city included:

- Russians (67.8%)
- Circassian (9.0%)
- Karachays (7.8%)
- Abazins (6.5%)
- Ukrainians (2.2%)
- Nogais (1.2%)
- Ossetians (0.5%)
- Greeks (0.5%)

==== 2002 ====
In 2002, the Russian census reported the population including:

- Russians (55.5%)
- Karachays (13.8%)
- Circassian (12.6%)
- Abazins (8.1%)
- Nogais (1.5%)
- Ukrainians (1.3%)
- Ossetians (0.6%)
- Greeks (Pontic Greeks) (0.4%)
- Other (6.1%)

==== 2010 ====
In 2010, the population included:

- Russians (54.7%)
- Karachays (16.4%)
- Circassian (13.2%)
- Abazins (8.2%)
- Nogais (1.5%)
- Other (6.0%)

==== 2021 ====
In 2021, the population included:

- Russians (45.5%)
- Karachays (23.8%)
- Circassians (16%)
- Abazins (9.5%)
- Nogais (1.5%)
- Other (3.7%)

== Climate ==
Climate data for Cherkessk (1991-2020 normals)
| Month | Jan | Feb | Mar | Apr | May | Jun | Jul | Aug | Sep | Oct | Nov | Dec | Year |
|---|---|---|---|---|---|---|---|---|---|---|---|---|---|
| Daily mean °C (°F) | −2.1 (28.2) | −1.3 (29.7) | 3.6 (38.5) | 9.7 (49.5) | 15.1 (59.2) | 19.1 (66.4) | 21.8 (71.2) | 21.4 (70.5) | 16.6 (61.9) | 10.6 (51.1) | 3.8 (38.8) | −0.3 (31.5) | 9.8 (49.7) |
| Average precipitation mm (inches) | 22 (0.9) | 22 (0.9) | 37 (1.5) | 52 (2.0) | 79 (3.1) | 98 (3.9) | 64 (2.5) | 65 (2.6) | 52 (2.0) | 47 (1.9) | 32 (1.3) | 27 (1.1) | 597 (23.7) |
| Average precipitation days (≥ 1 mm) | 6 | 5 | 7 | 8 | 10 | 11 | 8 | 7 | 7 | 7 | 6 | 6 | 88 |
| Mean monthly sunshine hours | 94 | 118 | 139 | 190 | 232 | 258 | 296 | 279 | 215 | 156 | 115 | 94 | 2,186 |
Source: Климатические нормы

Climate data for Cherkessk
| Month | Jan | Feb | Mar | Apr | May | Jun | Jul | Aug | Sep | Oct | Nov | Dec | Year |
|---|---|---|---|---|---|---|---|---|---|---|---|---|---|
| Mean daily maximum °C (°F) | 2.1 (35.8) | 3.9 (39.0) | 8.2 (46.8) | 14.0 (57.2) | 18.7 (65.7) | 22.6 (72.7) | 25.6 (78.1) | 26.1 (79.0) | 20.9 (69.6) | 14.9 (58.8) | 8.8 (47.8) | 3.8 (38.8) | 14.1 (57.4) |
| Daily mean °C (°F) | −3.0 (26.6) | −1.3 (29.7) | 2.9 (37.2) | 8.7 (47.7) | 13.9 (57.0) | 18.1 (64.6) | 20.9 (69.6) | 21.0 (69.8) | 15.9 (60.6) | 9.7 (49.5) | 3.3 (37.9) | −1.2 (29.8) | 9.1 (48.3) |
| Mean daily minimum °C (°F) | −7.4 (18.7) | −5.9 (21.4) | −2.4 (27.7) | 2.7 (36.9) | 8.1 (46.6) | 12.3 (54.1) | 15.1 (59.2) | 15.4 (59.7) | 10.7 (51.3) | 5.1 (41.2) | −0.8 (30.6) | −5.2 (22.6) | 4.0 (39.2) |
| Average rainfall mm (inches) | 38.3 (1.51) | 29.5 (1.16) | 62.5 (2.46) | 57.8 (2.28) | 120.4 (4.74) | 95.7 (3.77) | 58.7 (2.31) | 46 (1.8) | 60 (2.4) | 50.9 (2.00) | 37.1 (1.46) | 35.9 (1.41) | 692.8 (27.3) |
| Average snowfall cm (inches) | 15.6 (6.1) | 6.2 (2.4) | 11.2 (4.4) | 3.4 (1.3) | 0.0 (0.0) | 0.0 (0.0) | 0.0 (0.0) | 0.0 (0.0) | 0.0 (0.0) | 1.9 (0.7) | 7.7 (3.0) | 14.3 (5.6) | 60.3 (23.5) |
| Average rainy days | 9 | 7 | 9 | 7 | 13 | 12 | 7 | 6 | 6 | 5 | 5 | 7 | 93 |
| Average relative humidity (%) | 83 | 79 | 75 | 67 | 67 | 67 | 64 | 66 | 67 | 74 | 78 | 82 | 72 |
| Mean daily sunshine hours | 3.7 | 4.2 | 4.8 | 6.2 | 7.8 | 9.1 | 9.3 | 9.2 | 7.7 | 5.9 | 3.8 | 3.1 | 6.2 |
| Average ultraviolet index | 1 | 2 | 2 | 3 | 4 | 4 | 6 | 5 | 4 | 2 | 2 | 2 | 3 |
Source: Climate data(Temperatures 1991-2021)Weather2visit, World weather online (rainfall-snowfall-UV 2009-2023)

== Education ==
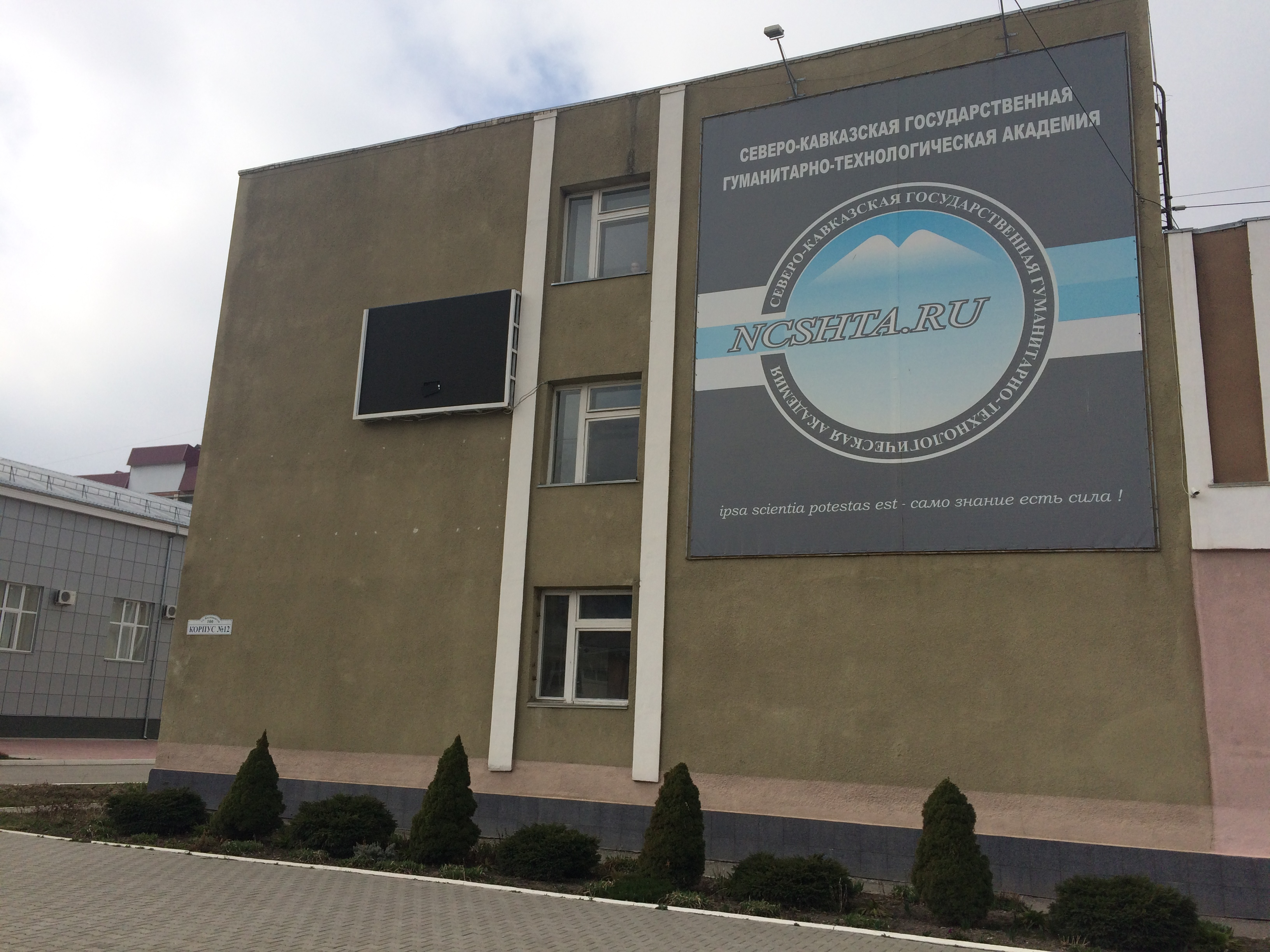
Cherkessk academy

Cherkessk is home to the following education institutions:

- North Caucasian State Academy: civil engineering, mechanical engineering, energy engineering, business management, accounting, finance, medical school. www.kchgta.ru
- Moscow Social Open University (branch)
- Moscow Modern Arts Institute (branch)
- Rostov State Economic University (branch)
- Karachay-Cherkess State College
- Daurov Art College: art, interior design, music, choreography divisions
- Republican Children Art School: music, art, choreography divisions

== Culture ==
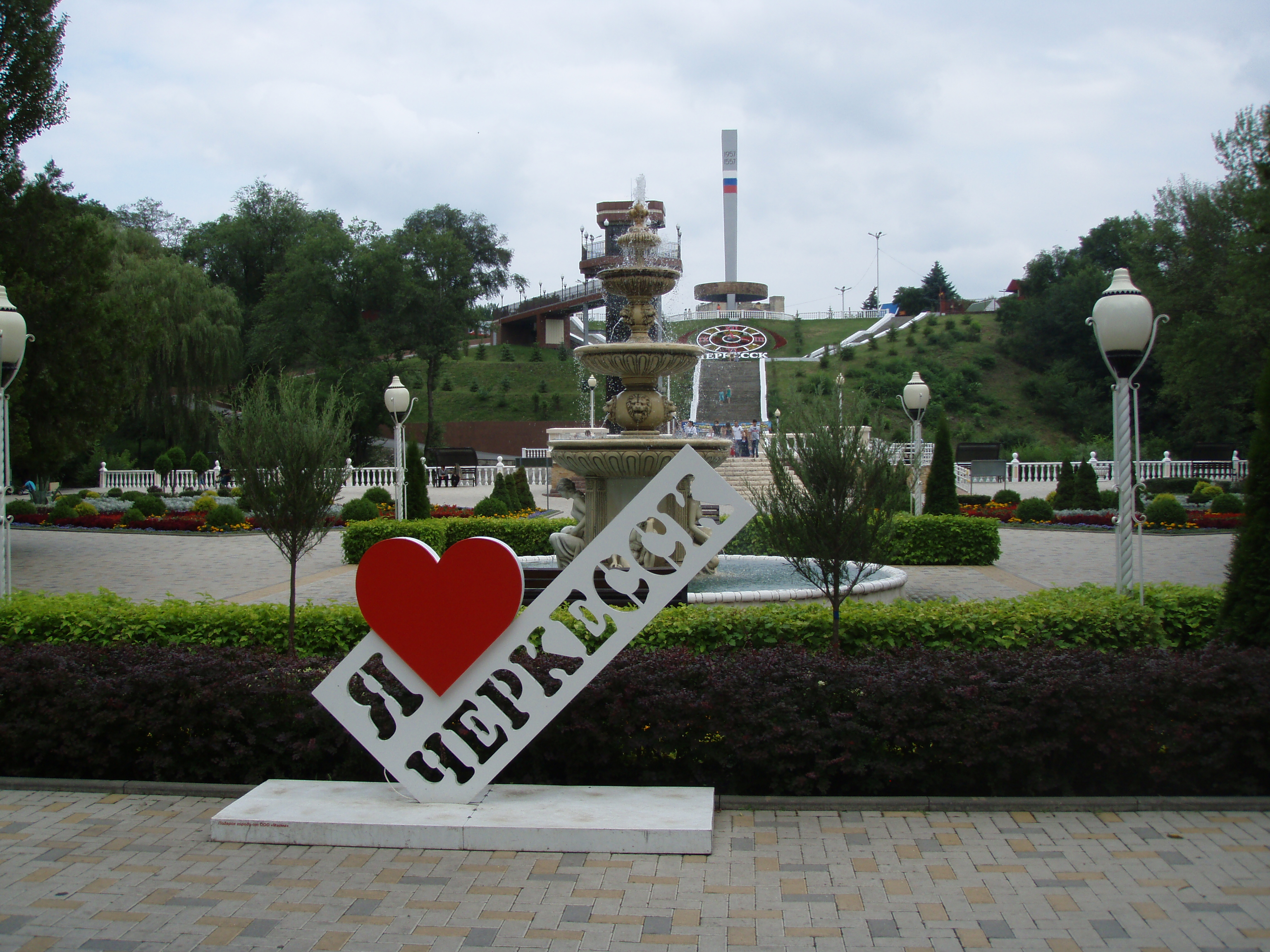
Tourism sign for Cherkessk

- Drama Theater: ethnic, modern and classical plays
- State Philharmonic: classical and ethnic orchestra performances
- Elbrus State Ensemble: ethnic North Caucasian dances, dance studio
- Ensemble of Cossack Dance and Song: ethnic performances

== Sport ==
- The association football team FC Inter Cherkessk play at the Stadium Nart. FC Nart Cherkessk previously played there, until they were dissolved in 2004.
- The demolished Dombay Stadium or Motodrom was a motorcycle speedway stadium located south of the Stadium Nart and Green Island off Ulitsa Michurina (44°13′09″N 42°02′09″E). The stadium hosted important events including the Continental Speedway final round of the Speedway World Championship in 1972 and a semi final of the 1991 Speedway Under-21 World Championship.
- The Cherkessk speedway team (under various nicknames) regularly participated in the Soviet Union Championship from 1972 through to 1992 and then during 1993, in the Russian Championship, winning the bronze medal in 1993.

== Notable people ==
- David Safaryan, World champion in freestyle wrestling representing Armenia
