= Armavir, Russia =

City in Krasnodar Krai, Russia

Armavir Армавир
- City
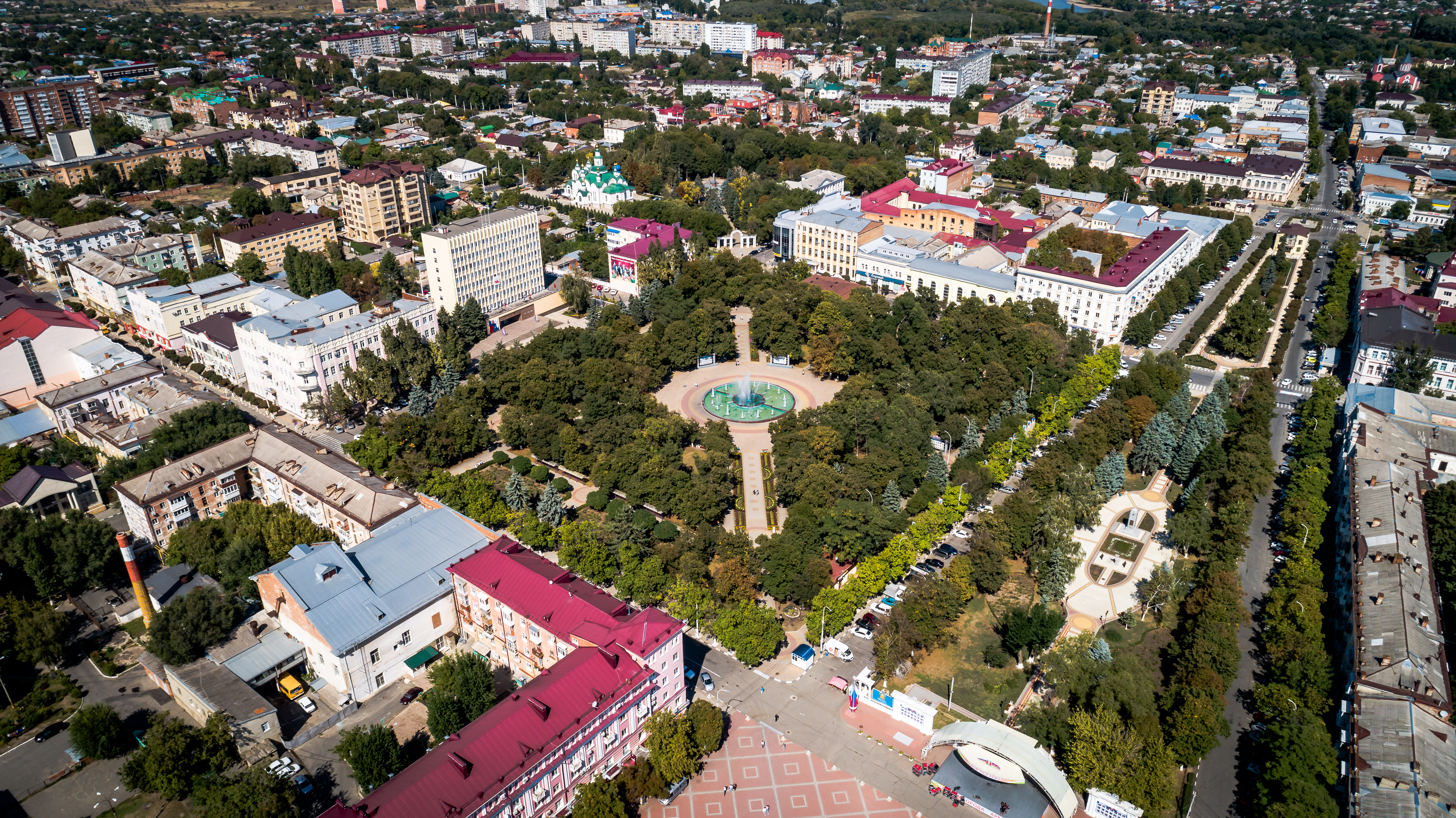
- Aerial view of the city center

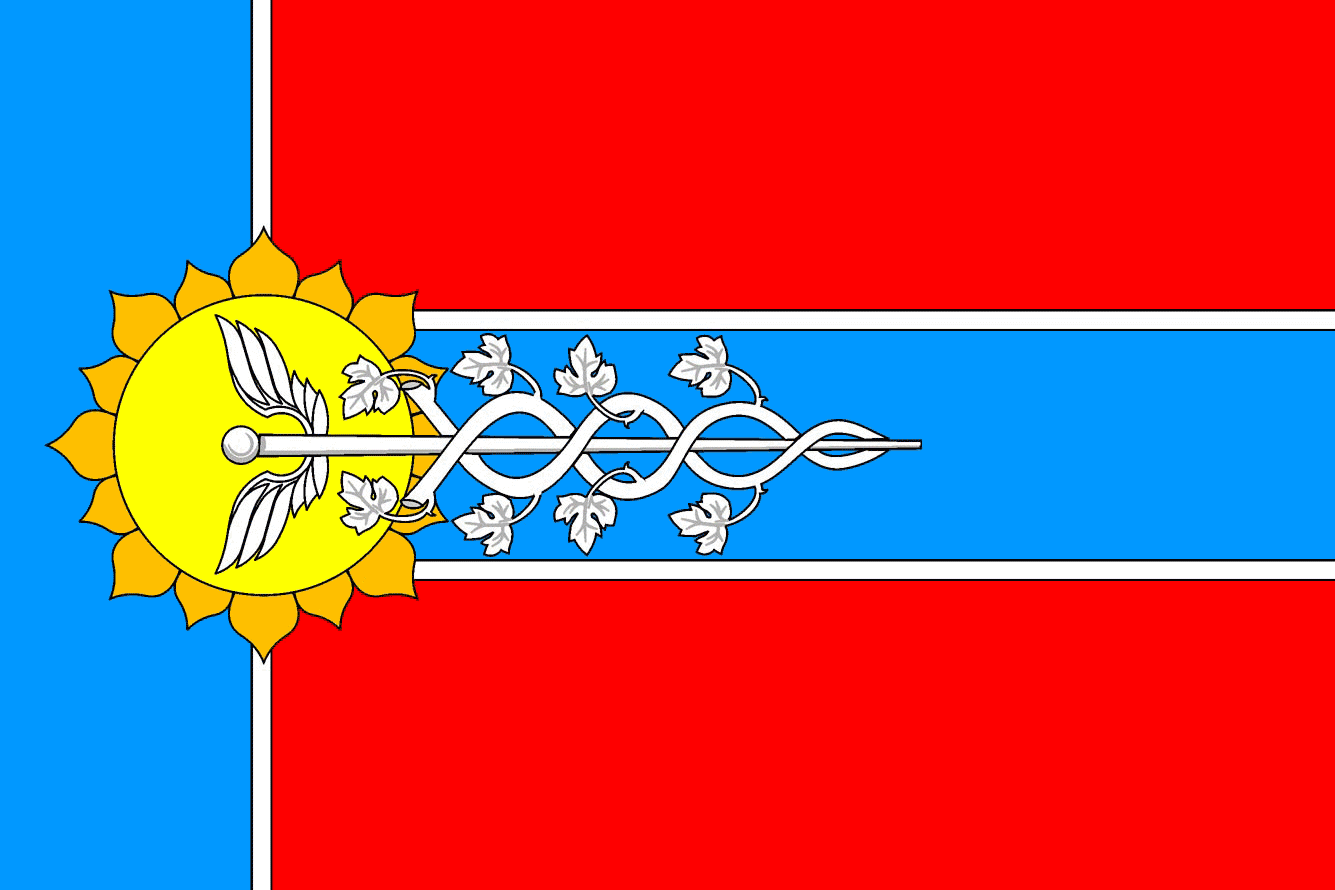
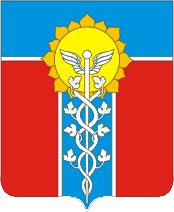
- Flag Coat of arms
- Interactive map of Armavir
- Location of Armavir Armavir (European Russia) Armavir (Europe)
- Coordinates: 45°00′N 41°07′E
- Country: Russia
- Federal subject: Krasnodar Krai
- Founded: 1839
- City status since: January 18, 1914

Government
  - Body: City Duma
  - Head: Andrey Kharchenko (acting)
- Elevation: 190 m (620 ft)

Population (2010 Census)
  - Total: 188,832
  - Estimate (2025): 185,356 (−1.8%)
  - Rank: 96th in 2010

Administrative status
  - Subordinated to: City of Armavir
  - Capital of: City of Armavir

Municipal status
  - Urban okrug: Armavir Urban Okrug
  - Capital of: Armavir Urban Okrug
- Time zone: UTC+3 (MSK)
- Postal codes: 352900–352906, 352909, 352910, 352912, 352913, 352915, 352916, 352918, 352919, 352922–352924, 352930–352932, 352949
- Dialing code: +7 86137
- OKTMO ID: 03705000001
- City Day: Third Sunday of September
- Website: www.armawir.ru

Armavir (Russian: Армави́р; Adyghe: Ермэлхьабл, romanized: Ermălḥabl; Armenian: Արմավիր; Ukrainian: Армавір) is a city in Krasnodar Krai, Russia, located on the left bank of the Kuban River. Population: 187,177 (2021 census); 188,832 (2010 census); 193,964 (2002 census); 160,983 (1989 Soviet census). As of 2020, the city has a population of 188,960, while the agglomeration has a population of 207,570. Armavir is the second-largest industrial center of Krasnodar Krai, after Krasnodar.

== History ==
The area of today's Armavir was first inhabited by Abazins. Later Tatars from the Crimean Khanate also settled here. As a result of the Caucasian War the remaining Abazins were forced to emigrate from North Caucasia to the Ottoman Empire. Armavir is also a part of the historical land of the Circassians.

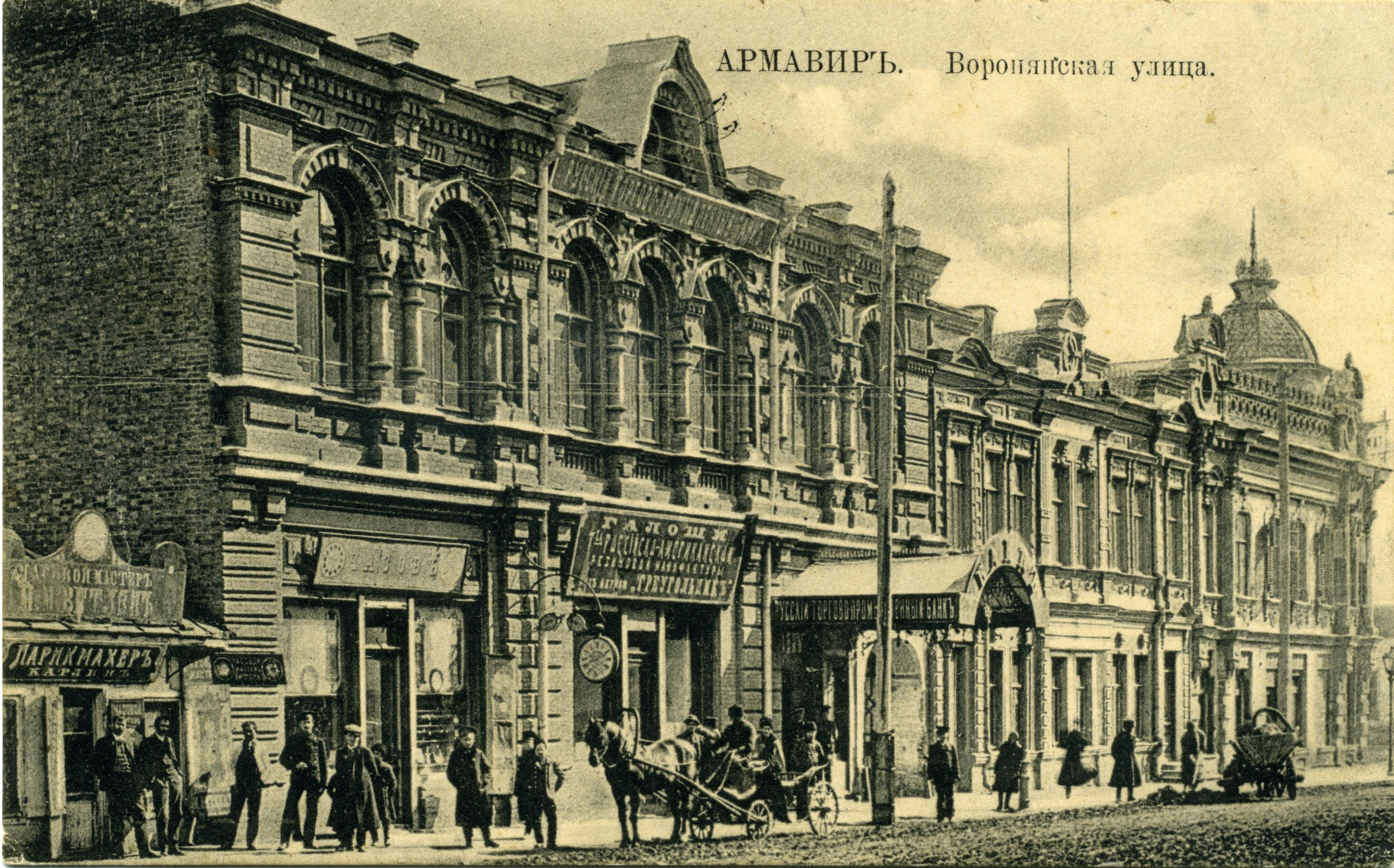
Armavir at the turn of the 19th and 20th centuries

The contemporary settlement was founded in 1839 by Cherkesogai Armenians as Armyansky aul (Армя́нский ау́л). It has been known by its current name since 1848, when it was named after Armavir, one of the historical capitals of ancient Armenia. The city was the administrative center of the Labinsky Otdel of the Kuban Oblast.

During the Russian Civil War of 1918–1920, a number of brutal battles took place near the city. The Taman Army's military campaign ended in Armavir in 1918. The Soviet authority was established in Armavir in March 1920. According to the 1926 census, the population was 44.8% Russian, 23.7% Ukrainian, 18.5% Armenian, 3.9% German, 1.9% Belarusian, 0.7% Polish, 0.6% Tatar and 0.5% Jewish.

During World War II, the city was occupied by the German Army. It was liberated by the Red Army in January 1943.

== Administrative and municipal status ==
Within the framework of administrative divisions, it is, together with eleven rural localities, incorporated as the City of Armavir—an administrative unit with the status equal to that of the districts. As a municipal division, the City of Armavir is incorporated as Armavir Urban Okrug.

== Industry ==
Armavir is the second-largest industrial center of Krasnodar Krai, after Krasnodar. The city is known as center for food processing, mechanical engineering and timber processing industries. Here is located one of the oldest engineering enterprises of Kuban - Kubanzheldormash, founded in 1933.

== Demographics ==
Historical population

Year	Pop.	±%
1897	18,000	—
1926	74,521	+314.0%
1939	83,651	+12.3%
1959	110,994	+32.7%
1970	144,000	+29.7%

Year	Pop.	±%
1979	161,539	+12.2%
1989	160,983	−0.3%
2002	193,964	+20.5%
2010	188,832	−2.6%
2021	187,177	−0.9%

Source: Census data

== Geography ==
=== Climate ===
Armavir has a humid continental climate.

Climate data for Armavir (1991-2020, extremes 1932–present)
Month	Jan	Feb	Mar	Apr	May	Jun	Jul	Aug	Sep	Oct	Nov	Dec	Year
Record high °C (°F)	17.5 (63.5)	23.6 (74.5)	31.0 (87.8)	36.8 (98.2)	35.1 (95.2)	39.8 (103.6)	40.9 (105.6)	41.1 (106.0)	40.0 (104.0)	36.3 (97.3)	27.4 (81.3)	21.1 (70.0)	41.1 (106.0)
Mean daily maximum °C (°F)	3.6 (38.5)	5.7 (42.3)	11.5 (52.7)	18.2 (64.8)	23.4 (74.1)	27.8 (82.0)	30.9 (87.6)	31.0 (87.8)	25.3 (77.5)	18.4 (65.1)	10.5 (50.9)	5.1 (41.2)	17.6 (63.7)
Daily mean °C (°F)	−0.7 (30.7)	0.3 (32.5)	5.4 (41.7)	11.5 (52.7)	16.9 (62.4)	21.1 (70.0)	23.8 (74.8)	23.6 (74.5)	18.3 (64.9)	12.0 (53.6)	5.2 (41.4)	0.9 (33.6)	11.5 (52.7)
Mean daily minimum °C (°F)	−3.7 (25.3)	−3.4 (25.9)	1.2 (34.2)	5.9 (42.6)	11.1 (52.0)	15.1 (59.2)	17.3 (63.1)	17.0 (62.6)	12.5 (54.5)	7.4 (45.3)	1.7 (35.1)	−2.1 (28.2)	6.7 (44.0)
Record low °C (°F)	−33.2 (−27.8)	−30.6 (−23.1)	−24.4 (−11.9)	−9.0 (15.8)	−2.6 (27.3)	1.5 (34.7)	7.8 (46.0)	4.4 (39.9)	−3.4 (25.9)	−9.6 (14.7)	−23.9 (−11.0)	−28.0 (−18.4)	−33.2 (−27.8)
Average precipitation mm (inches)	37 (1.5)	34 (1.3)	44 (1.7)	45 (1.8)	96 (3.8)	83 (3.3)	61 (2.4)	54 (2.1)	52 (2.0)	62 (2.4)	45 (1.8)	40 (1.6)	653 (25.7)
Average precipitation days (≥ 1.0 mm)	8	7	9	7	10	8	6	5	7	7	7	8	89
Average relative humidity (%)	81	76	72	66	69	67	63	60	68	75	79	82	72
Mean monthly sunshine hours	94	113	156	191	255	280	310	286	229	174	109	79	2,276
Source 1: Pogoda.ru.net
Source 2: climatebase.ru (sun, 1936-2012)

== Military ==
Armavir Radar Station is on the site of Baronovsky Airfield, 12 kilometers (7.5 mi) southwest of the town. Armavir (air base) is close to the city.

== Twin towns – sister cities ==
Armavir is twinned with:

- Armavir, Armenia
- Feodosia, Ukraine
- Gomel, Belarus

== Notable people ==
- Konstantin Orbelyan (1928–2014), pianist and composer. People's Artist of the USSR
- Arsen Papikyan (born 1972), professional football manager and a former player
- George Avakian (1919–2017), record producer
