= Kavkazsky otdel =

District in Caucasus, Russian Empire

Coordinates: 45°27′N 40°41′E

Kavkazsky otdel Кавказскій отдѣлъ
- Otdel
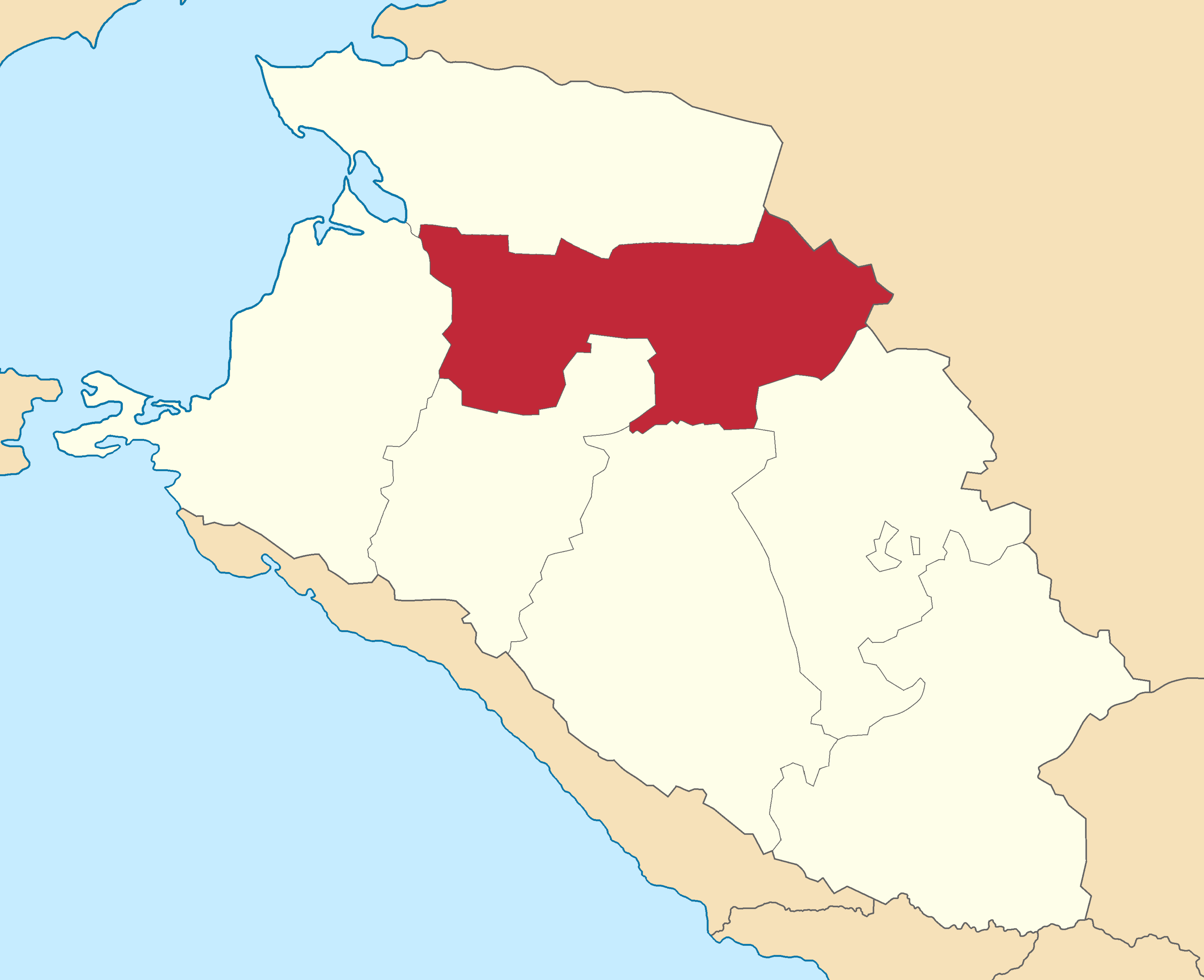
- Location in the Kuban Oblast
- Country: Russian Empire
- Viceroyalty: Caucasus
- Oblast: Kuban
- Established: 1876
- Abolished: 1924
- Capital: Kavkazskaya

Area
  - Total: 15,866.18 km^{2} (6,125.97 sq mi)

Population (1916)
  - Total: 462,235
  - Density: 29.1334/km^{2} (75.4550/sq mi)
  - Rural: 100.00%

The Kavkazsky otdel (Note: Russian: Кавка́зскій отдѣ́лъ, romanized: Kavkázsky otdél; Ukrainian: Кавказький відділ, romanized: Kavkazkyy viddil) was a Cossack district (otdel) of the Kuban oblast of the Caucasus Viceroyalty of the Russian Empire. It bordered the Yeysky otdel to the north, the Tamansky otdel to the west, the Yekaterinodarsky and Maykopsky otdels to the south, and the Stavropol Governorate to the east. The area of the Kavkazsky otdel mostly corresponded to the contemporary Krasnodar Krai region of the Russian Federation. The district was eponymously named for its administrative center, Kavkazskaya.

== Administrative divisions ==
The subcounties (uchastoks) of the Kavkazsky otdel in 1912 were as follows:

Name	1912 population
1-y uchastok (1-й участокъ)	44,713
2-y uchastok (2-й участокъ)	40,780
3-y uchastok (3-й участокъ)	59,122
4-y uchastok (4-й участокъ)	56,488

== Demographics ==
=== Russian Empire Census ===
According to the Russian Empire Census, the Kavkazsky otdel had a population of 249,182 on 28 January [O.S. 15 January] 1897, including 126,540 men and 122,642 women. The majority of the population indicated Russian to be their mother tongue, with a significant Ukrainian speaking minority.

Linguistic composition of the Kavkazsky otdel in 1897
Language	Native speakers	%
Russian	127,385	51.12
Ukrainian	114,037	45.76
German	3,972	1.59
Belarusian	757	0.30
Armenian	728	0.29
Polish	378	0.15
Tatar (Note: Before 1918, Azerbaijanis were generally known as "Tatars". This term, employed by the Russians, referred to Turkic-speaking Muslims of the South Caucasus. After 1918, with the establishment of the Azerbaijan Democratic Republic and "especially during the Soviet era", the Tatar group identified itself as "Azerbaijani".)	335	0.13
Romanian	307	0.12
Romani	279	0.11
Greek	182	0.07
Czech	117	0.05
Latvian	101	0.04
Bulgarian	96	0.04
Mordovian	89	0.04
Georgian	85	0.03
Kalmyk	66	0.03
Ossetian	63	0.03
Turkish	36	0.01
Jewish	30	0.01
Kazi-Kumukh	23	0.01
Kyurin	23	0.01
Circassian	17	0.01
Lithuanian	15	0.01
Kabardian	12	0.00
Kumyk	10	0.00
Persian	6	0.00
Nogai	5	0.00
Estonian	3	0.00
Avar-Andean	2	0.00
Karachay	1	0.00
Other	22	0.01
TOTAL	249,182	100.00

=== Kavkazskiy kalendar ===
According to the 1917 publication of Kavkazskiy kalendar, the Kavkazsky otdel had a population of 462,235 on 14 January [O.S. 1 January] 1916, including 235,883 men and 226,352 women, 235,550 of whom were the permanent population, and 226,685 were temporary residents:

Nationality	Number	%
Russians	454,981	98.43
Other Europeans	5,280	1.14
Armenians	1,046	0.23
Shia Muslims (Note: Primarily Tatars.)	629	0.14
Georgians	224	0.05
North Caucasians	72	0.02
Jews	3	0.00
TOTAL	462,235	100.00

== Bibliography ==
- Bournoutian, George A. (2018). Armenia and Imperial Decline: The Yerevan Province, 1900–1914. Milton Park, Abingdon, Oxon: Routledge. ISBN 978-1-351-06260-2. OCLC 1037283914.
- Hovannisian, Richard G. (1971). The Republic of Armenia. Vol. 1: The First Year, 1918–1919. Berkeley: University of California Press. ISBN 978-0520019843.
- Кавказский календарь на 1913 год [Caucasian calendar for 1913] (in Russian) (68th ed.). Tiflis: Tipografiya kantselyarii Ye.I.V. na Kavkaze, kazenny dom. 1913. Archived from the original on 19 April 2022.
- Кавказский календарь на 1917 год [Caucasian calendar for 1917] (in Russian) (72nd ed.). Tiflis: Tipografiya kantselyarii Ye.I.V. na Kavkaze, kazenny dom. 1917. Archived from the original on 4 November 2021.
- Tsutsiev, Arthur (2014). Atlas of the Ethno-Political History of the Caucasus (PDF). Translated by Nora Seligman Favorov. New Haven: Yale University Press. ISBN 9780300153088. Archived (PDF) from the original on 17 June 2023.
