= Elizabeth Carey =

Elizabeth Carey may refer to:

- Elizabeth Carey (social activist) (1835–1920), Canadian social activist
- Elizabeth Danvers (1545/50–1630), née Neville, Carey by her 2nd marriage, Tudor English noblewoman
- Elizabeth Carey, Lady Berkeley (1576–1635), noblewoman and patron of the arts, daughter of Baroness Hunsdon
- Elizabeth Cary, Viscountess Falkland (née Tanfield; 1585–1639), English poet, dramatist, translator, and historian
- Elizabeth Spencer, Baroness Hunsdon (1552–1618), Carey by her second marriage
- Elizabeth Trevannion (died 1641), Carey by marriage, later Countess of Monmouth
- Betty Lowman Carey (1914–2011), rower

== See also ==
- Elizabeth Cary (disambiguation)
