= Heston and Isleworth =

Heston and Isleworth may refer to the following in England:

- Municipal Borough of Heston and Isleworth
- Heston and Isleworth (UK Parliament constituency)

== See also ==
- Heston
- Isleworth
