= Cranford Park =

Park in London Borough of Hillingdon, United Kingdom

Coordinates: 51°29′19″N 0°24′59″W

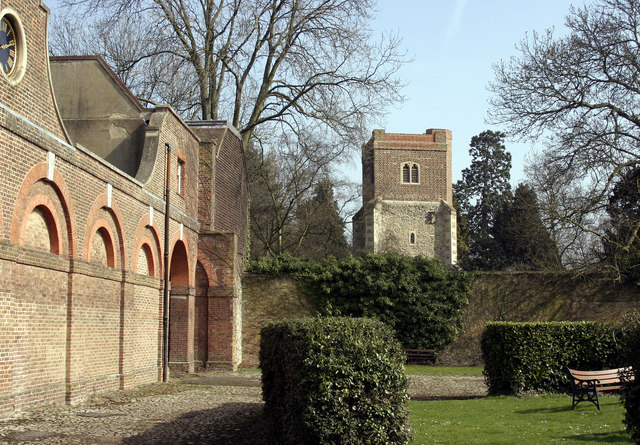
Tower of St Dunstan's Church and the Stable Block (left) at Cranford Park

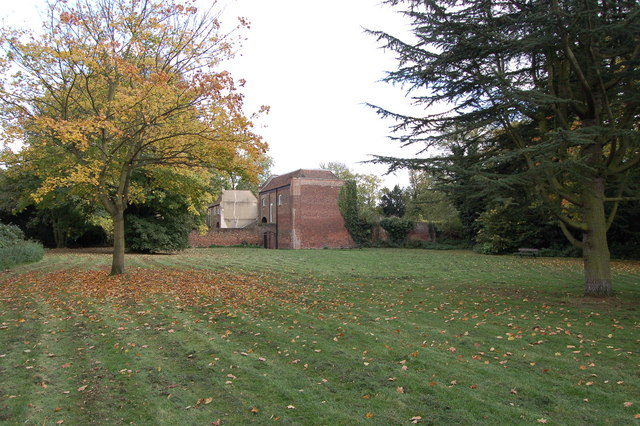
Former walled garden of Cranford House

Cranford Countryside Park is a 144-acre public park in Cranford, in the London Borough of Hillingdon, England. Situated near to Heathrow Airport, it is bordered by the M4 Motorway to the north, the A312 trunk road to the east, and by the towns of Harlington and Cranford to the southwest and southeast respectively. Although Cranford is mostly within the London Borough of Hounslow, the park itself is in the London Borough of Hillingdon, as it straddles the southernmost point of this borough. Although the park is in an urban location, it is vehicle-accessible only by a small road before a motorway entrance slip, and as such it has been described as a 'hidden gem'.

The park features in the London Parks & Gardens Trust's ‘Inventory of Historic Green Spaces’ and is centrally positioned on the Crane Valley's parkland chain. It is fully open to the public from 07:30 to 21:00 during the summer months, and closes instead at dusk during the autumn, winter and spring. Facilities include an information centre, toilets, a car park, a children's playground and a bridlepath route. Situated roughly 1 mile south of Hayes & Harlington railway station and one mile northwest of Hounslow West tube station, Cranford Park is accessible by rail; however, London Buses routes 81, 105, 111, 195, 222, H98, H28 and E6 serve passengers closer to the park's location.

== History ==
The park has significant historical importance, with settlements in the area including within the area of the park dating at least from Saxon times. Within the park grounds are a number of Grade II listed buildings including the medieval St Dunstan's Church and a block of 18th-century stables. There was once a manor house on the site of the park; however, this was demolished following World War 2, shortly before the park was jointly opened to the public by Hayes & Harlington UDC and Heston & Isleworth Borough Council in 1949.

The park surrounds and extends from the church of St Dunstan with Holy Angels, Parish of Cranford. The church is thought to have been founded during the reign of Edward the Confessor, and the surrounding land has been part of the estates of the Knights Templar, Sir Roger Aston and Elizabeth Carey, Lady Berkeley whose living descendants still have possessions here today. It is likely that a place of worship of some capacity has stood on this site since at least the 8th century The earliest known reference is to be found in Sir Montague Sharpe's edition of Middlesex in British, Roman and Saxon Times, in which he mentions the church at Cranford as one of those built upon the site of a compita, or 'little chapel', which usually stood at the cross-roads, and where the Romans offered sacrifices to their rural gods twice a year.

As of 2024, work is currently underway to create a café on the site where the house formerly stood, with access to the underground cellars which remain from the original building.

== Gallery ==
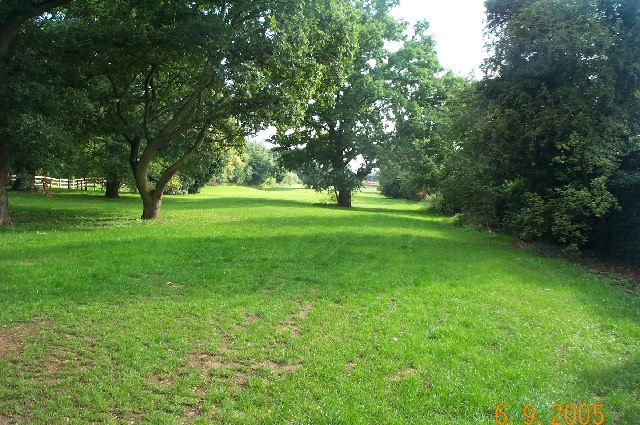
Open space with trees

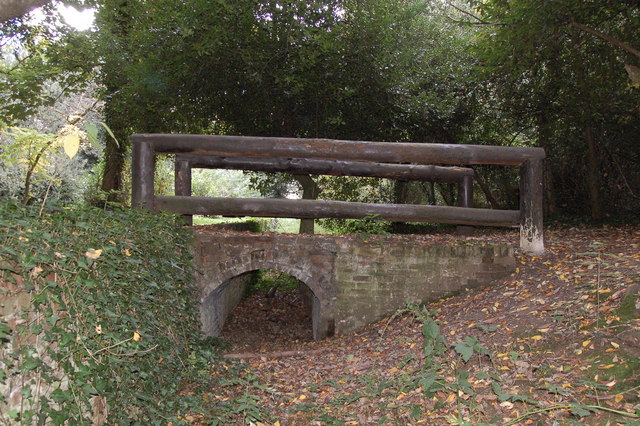
Bridge over a ha-ha in woodland

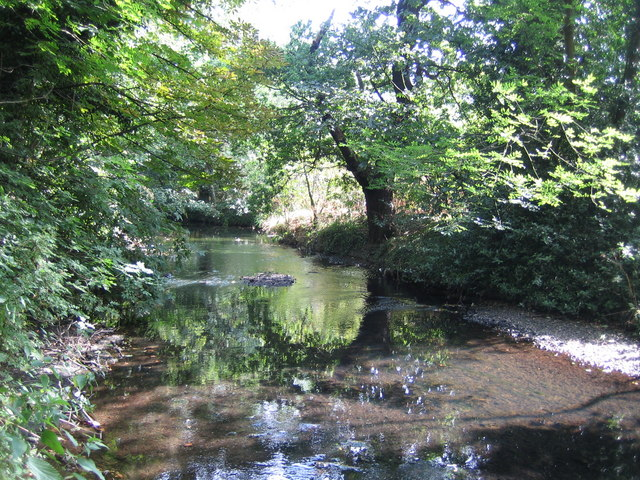
River Crane in Cranford Park

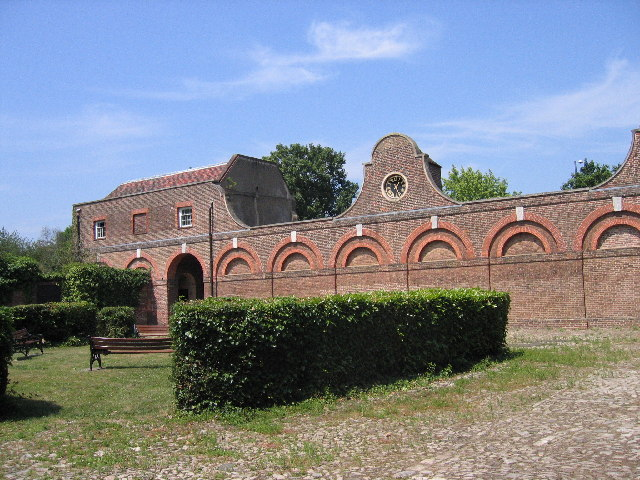
The Stable Block

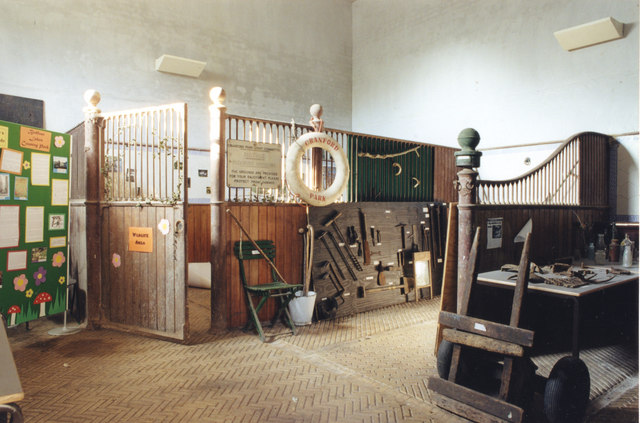
Interior of the Stable Block

=== Church of St Dunstan ===
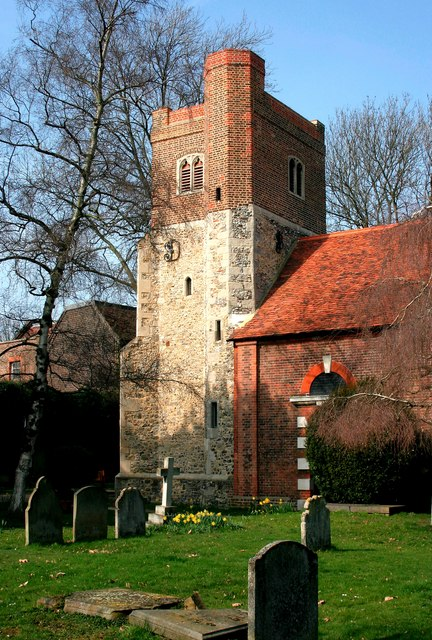
Church tower of St Dunstan

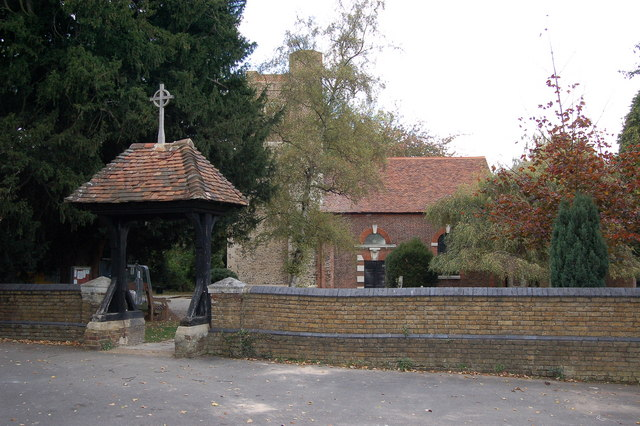
Lychgate

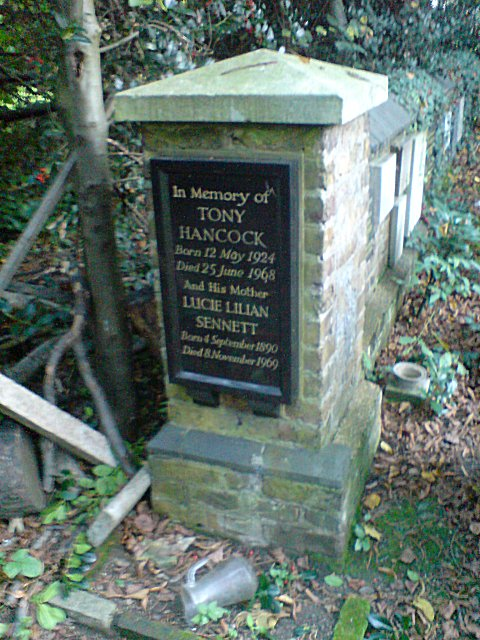
Tony Hancock Memorial

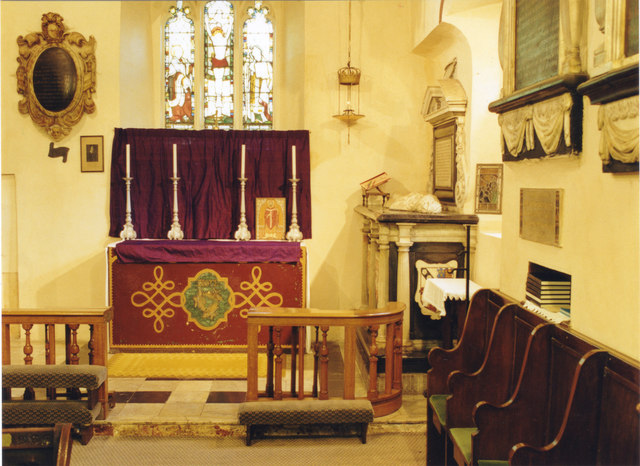
Interior of the church

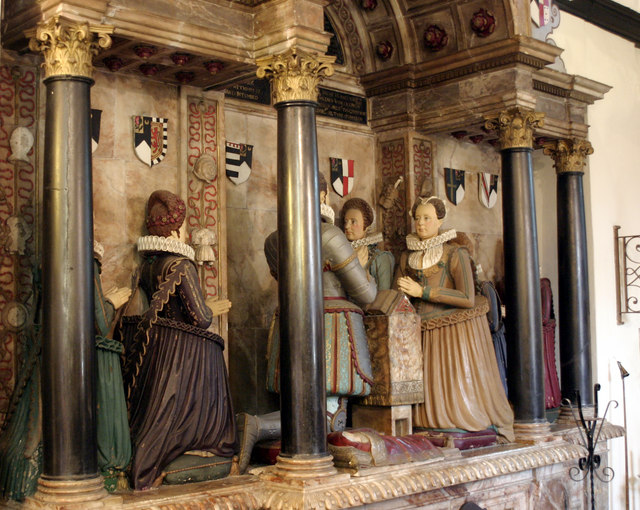
Aston Monument

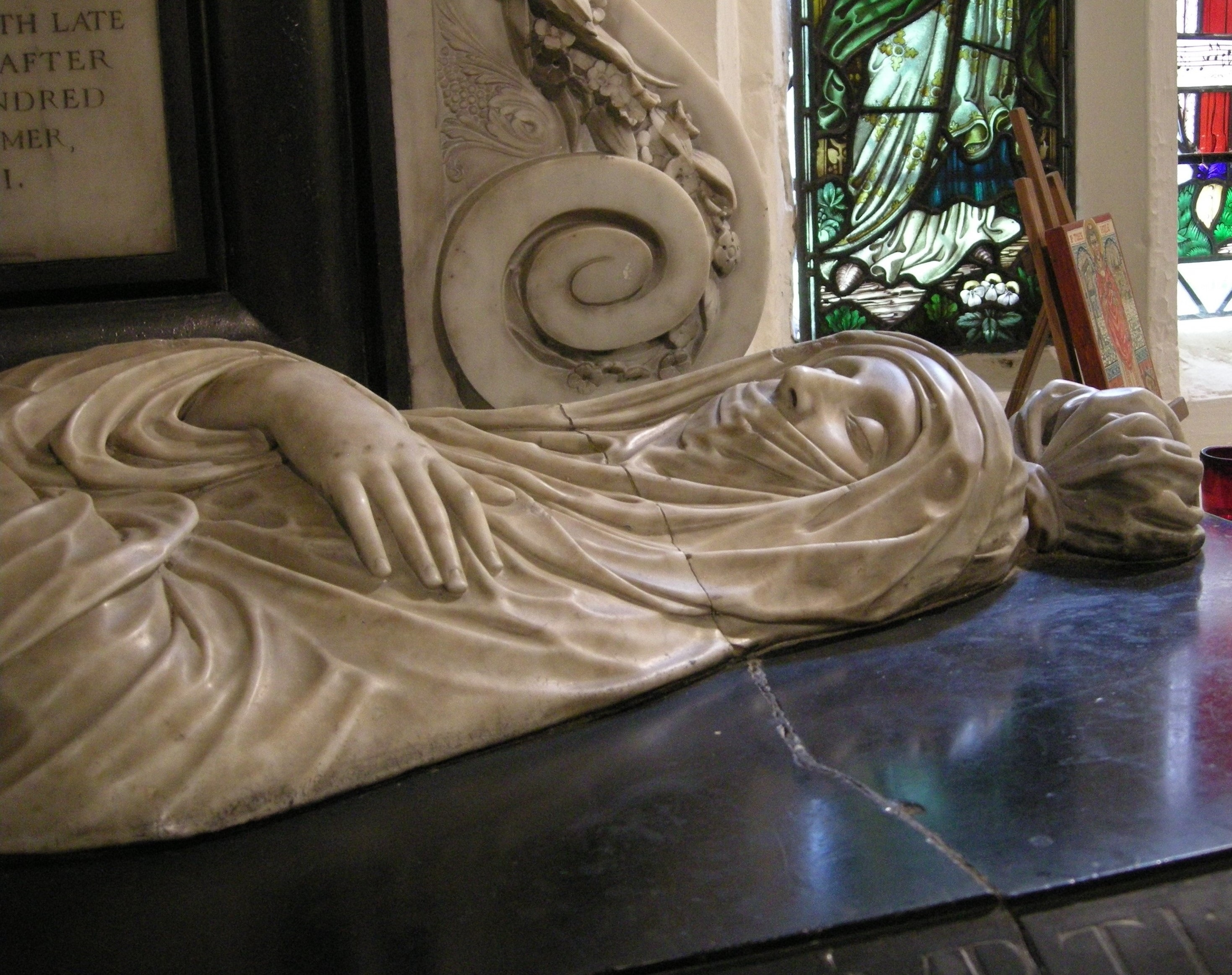
Tomb of Elizabeth Carey, Lady Berkeley
