= Nova Scotia Society for the Prevention of Cruelty =

Animal humane society in Nova Scotia, Canada

- Abbreviation: Nova Scotia SPCA
- Formation: 1877
- Type: Animal welfare organization in Canada
- Legal status: Active
- Purpose: Advocate and public voice, educator and network
- Headquarters: Dartmouth, Nova Scotia
- Location: Nova Scotia
- Region served: Nova Scotia, Canada
- Official language: English; French
- Revenue: $1,602,165
- Staff: 9
- Volunteers: 150+
- Website: http://www.spcans.ca/

The Nova Scotia Society for the Prevention of Cruelty (Nova Scotia SPCA) is a not-for-profit charitable society organized under the Animal Protection Act of the Canadian province of Nova Scotia. The Society is dedicated to the prevention of cruelty to animals and to the promotion of respect and humane care for animals. Its members are committed to providing humane leadership in animal advocacy, protection, education, and veterinary care.

== Mission of the Society ==
The Nova Scotia Society for the Prevention of Cruelty to Animals is involved solely with the prevention of cruelty to animals and the promotion of humane education. The Society maintains an education program which is available to provincial schools. It also has a resource center for students and teachers who want information on animal related topics.

The Society is a charitable, non profit organization that is not funded by the government and is supported mainly by those people who are genuinely concerned with the welfare of animals. The Society relies almost entirely on support from the general public by way of donations, memberships and bequests.

The organization's legal name is the "Nova Scotia Society for the Prevention of Cruelty," reflecting its history of both animal and child cruelty prevention. However, for the purpose of relating to the public and to reflect the current activities of the Society, the name "Nova Scotia Society for the Prevention of Cruelty to Animals (Nova Scotia SPCA)" is used for day-to-day business.

== History ==
=== Early years ===
Nova Scotia has the distinction of being the first place in North America to pass laws for the prevention of cruelty to animals. This was done in the year that Great Britain first enacted such laws – 1822. The acts of Nova Scotia in 1824 made provisions for public whipping to be the punishment for persons convicted of cruelty to animals.

The Nova Scotia Society for the Prevention of Cruelty to Animals became an incorporated Society in 1877. In 1880, the Society was vested with the authority to appoint agents that had all the power and authority by law conferred upon peace officers and constables to secure compliance with any Act to be enforced for the prevention of cruelty to animals. Also in 1880, the Society was authorized and empowered to organize branch societies, which are under the control and subject to the direction of the parent Society.

=== Protection of animals ===
Society records show many instances of the Society's protection of Nova Scotia animals:

- following the Halifax Explosion in 1917, the Society repaired and reconstructed approximately 250 barns, with the assistance of two agents and cash from the Massachusetts SPCA;
- the Society records for the year ending 1932 showed 1272 horses were inspected resulting in 589 owners and drivers being warned;
- on June 2, 1960, after the Society sent a telegram of concern to Prime Minister John Diefenbaker in Ottawa, requesting a full investigation into a proposal to remove horses from Sable Island, a message from the Prime Minister advised: "The horses and their progeny will not be removed from Sable Island but will be left to roam wild and free as has been their custom for centuries."
- late in November, 1961 news came from the offices of the Prime Minister that it was now an offence punishable by a fine of $200, two months in jail, or both: "to molest, interfere with, feed or otherwise have anything to do with the horses on Sable Island," without the written permission of the agent responsible for the administration of the island.

=== Protection of humans ===
In addition to protecting animals from cruelty, in 1880 the law was amended to authorize the Society to deal with cruelty to children under 16 years of age, as well as animals. Under this category, the prime function of the SPCA between 1880 and 1900 was the provision of marriage counseling and legal aid for estranged couples and harassed spouses, usually at the instigation of the wife.

In 1906 the Nova Scotia Department of Social Services took over the actual care of helpless persons. However, for the next 25 years, the Society continued to be empowered to care for Nova Scotia's citizens:

- in 1914, the name of the Society was changed by deleting the word "Animals" in its title, and the law was changed to authorize the Society to have all the powers which were vested in the Children's Aid Society under the provisions of the Children's Protection Act;
- in 1917 and 1918 following the Halifax Explosion the Society assisted with approximately 1,500 injured and/or orphaned children;
- as recently as 1932, the Nova Scotia SPCA was still helping to prevent cruelty to children by investigating and reporting many such events. The Society's report for the year ending December 31, 1932 showed 108 parents warned and 155 children benefiting from these warnings. The Society also removed 100 helpless persons to shelter.

=== Halifax Animal Shelter ===
The Society owned and operated an animal shelter in the city of Halifax until late 1985. At that time, the Society found it necessary to sell the shelter due to financial constraints. For five years from 1985 to 1991, the Society found itself providing its services in the Halifax Metro area handicapped by the fact that it could not operate a shelter.

In 1988, a gentlemen by the name of John A. Kennedy died, leaving a sizable bequest to the Society. Due to the money received from the bequest, the dedication and cooperation of the newly formed Halifax Metro Branch Board, and the Provincial Board and staff, the Society was able to open the doors of its newly constructed Halifax Metro SPCA Animal Shelter in Dartmouth on January 10, 1991. This shelter serves the Halifax Regional Municipality.

On March 10, 1992, a devastating fire caused extensive damage to the newly built Halifax Metro SPCA Animal Shelter. Worst of all, four animals perished in the fire. No one was formally charged for the fire, however arson was suspected. On June 26, 1992, the doors of the reconstructed Halifax Metro SPCA Animal Shelter were opened.

== The Society today ==
=== Province-wide mandate ===
The Society has provincial obligations and is expected to provide effective means for the prevention of cruelty throughout the province. It provides these means by enforcing all laws which now exist or may exist in the future for protection of animals, as well as humane education programs.

The Society is also the parent body to ten branches located in various parts of the province. They service the following areas: Antigonish, Cape Breton, Colchester, Hants, Kings, Lunenburg, Pictou, Queens, Shelburne, and Yarmouth. Four of these branches maintain animal shelters: Colchester Shelter, P. O. Box 914, Truro, Dartmouth; Cape Breton Shelter, 400 East Broadway, Sydney; Pictou County Shelter, Granton Road, New Glasgow; and Yarmouth Shelter, 298 Hardscratch Road, Brooklyn. There is also an SPCA Shelter in Dartmouth which is under the auspices of the board of directors and the Chief Provincial Investigator- SPCA Metro Shelter, 5 Scarfe Court, Dartmouth.

=== Organization ===
In 2014, the Society operated with a 16-member Board of Directors, including representatives from the membership, the branches, and the government of Nova Scotia. There were nine employees and over 150 volunteers.

The Society had revenues of $1,602,165, and expenses of $1,678,124. When earnings from investments were taken into account, the Society had a net deficit of $47,183.

=== Legislation ===
In January, 2010, the Animal Protection Act was proclaimed. It replaced the Animal Cruelty Prevention Act, which had been in place since 1996. The new legislation provides strong legislative protection for animals.

Society peace officers have significant power under the Act. Violators can be fined for a first or second offence not more than $5,000 and in default of payment, to imprisonment for a term not exceeding six months, or both fine and imprisonment. A third offence would net a fine not more than $10,000 and in default of payment, to imprisonment for a term not exceeding six months, or both fine and imprisonment. More importantly, the courts can now prohibit the ownership of animals to the violators of this legislation, and may impose a lifetime ban preventing them from ever owing animals again.

The Society has one provincial Investigator, aided by numerous special constables appointed by the Department of Justice, throughout the province. The majority of these special constables are volunteers. SPCA special constables may seize and impound (when necessary) animals found in neglect or that are being cruelly treated. Seized animals may be reclaimed if conditions are corrected and all expenses of seizure and examination by a veterinarian are paid. The SPCA also enforces sections of the Criminal Code which pertain to cruelty to animals.

In many cases, animals are left to exist in conditions far below the acceptable standards because they have no voice of their own. SPCA special constables rely heavily in information received from concerned citizens to lead them to animals in need of the Society's help. All calls to the Society are kept in confidence. However, if the abuse is extreme, an informant may be called as a witness. Court trials are always the last resort, as the NSSPC will attempt to provide humane education first.

=== No-Kill ===
In 2009, the Society made a commitment to become a no-kill shelter, disclosing detailed statistics including "No Kill Equation" topics, such as the number of animals in foster care, and numbers of feral cats benefiting from trap-neuter-return. In 2010, the organization reported saving 81.8% of the animals leaving its custody, while 50 healthy or treatable animals were euthanized. These numbers were a significant improvement over a 65% save rate in 2009, when 301 animals were euthanized for space. In 2012, the organization reported saving 91.2% of animals leaving its custody, although 12 healthy or treatable animals were euthanized. In 2013, 20 animals were euthanized, while in 2014, 102 animals were euthanized.

A new executive director took over in September 2013. However, the organization continues to describe itself as a "no kill animal welfare organization" on its website in outlining its strategic goals. The organization's vision "that Nova Scotia be a no-kill province and a safe place for all animals with zero tolerance for animal cruelty" is included on its website as well as its 2013 annual report.

In July 2014, the society took over the animal control contract for Kings County, a location which had received negative publicity for euthanizing healthy cats and kittens. Kings County branch members are working on creating Nova Scotia's first cat sanctuary on land adjacent to their Waterville shelter.

== See also ==
- Elizabeth Carey (social activist)
