= Henry Stone (painter) =

English painter

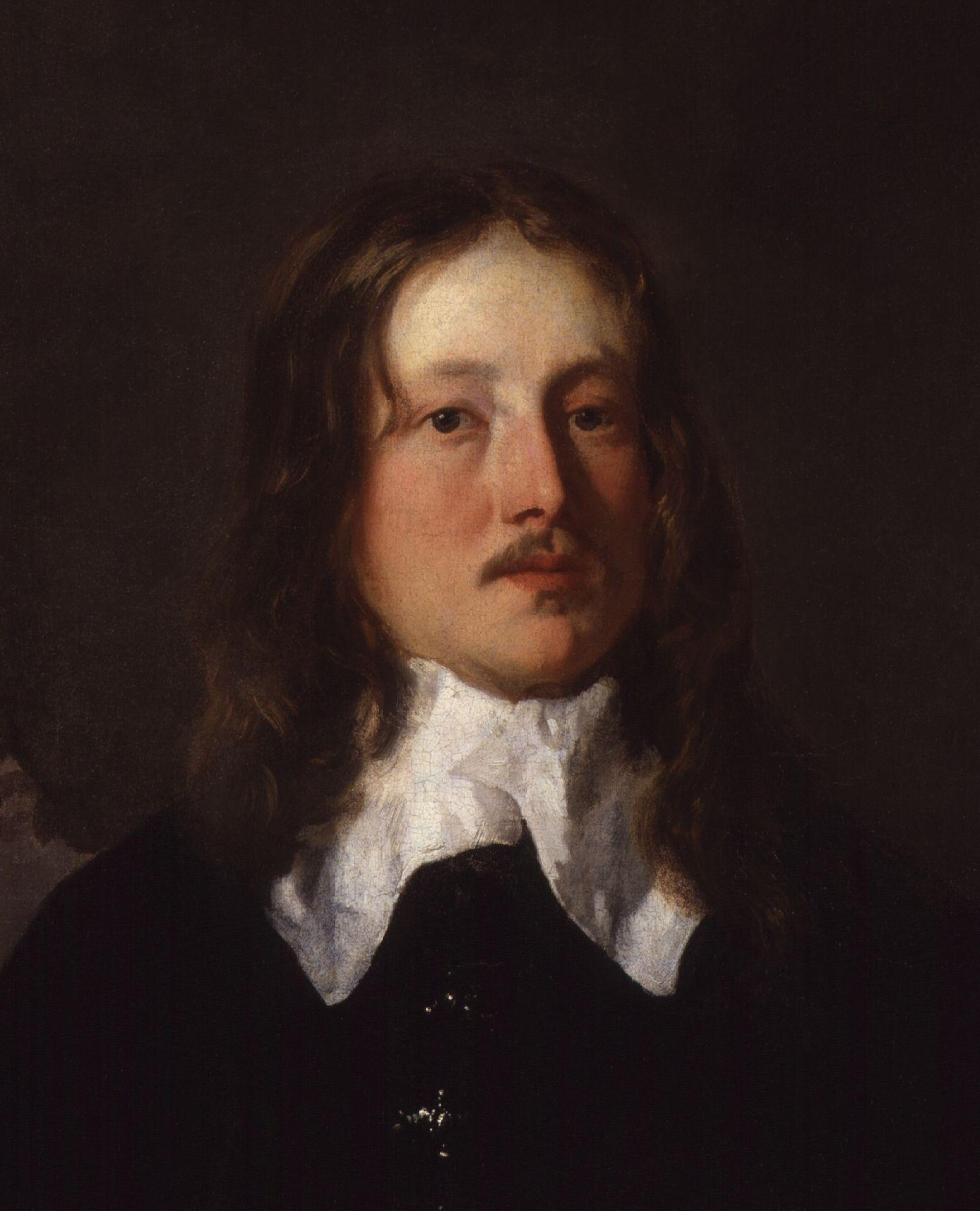
Henry Stone by Sir Peter Lely, 1648, National Portrait Gallery, London

Henry Stone (1616 – 24 August 1653), known as "Old Stone", was an English painter and copyist of the works of Van Dyck.

Henry was the eldest son of notable sculptor and architect Nicholas Stone (1586/7-1647); his brothers Nicholas Stone Jr. (1618–1647) and John Stone (1620–67) were sculptors and masons. Henry went to Holland, where he was apprenticed to his uncle, the painter Thomas de Keyser. He later went on a tour of the continent with his brother Nicholas Jr. visiting France, and Italy to study art, and returned in 1642. After his father's death he and his youngest brother John carried on their father's business of masonry and statuary.

Stone was, however, chiefly known as a portrait painter, and was an excellent copyist of the works of Van Dyck and the Italian Masters. He also published a short work on painting, called "The Third Part of the Art of Painting".

Stone inherited his father's house and workyard in Long Acre, London and died there on 24 August 1653. He was buried on 27 August near his father in St. Martin's Church, and on his inscription it is stated that he had passed the greatest part of thirty-seven years in Holland, France, and Italy. He is usually known as 'Old Stone' to distinguish him from his younger brothers.

Henry's Stone's portrait was painted by Sir Peter Lely.
