= Cranford, London =

Coordinates: 51.4766°N 0.4079°W

Cranford
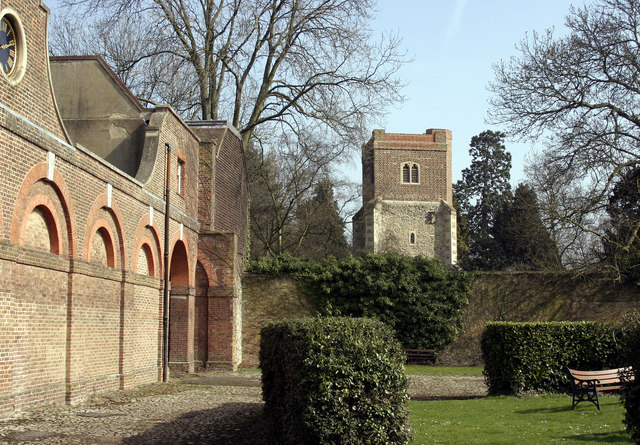
- Cranford Park stable block with the tower of St Dunstan's Church in the background

- Location within Greater London
- Area: 2.72 km^{2} (1.05 sq mi)
- Population: 12,330 (Cranford wards 2011)
  - Density: 4,533/km^{2} (11,740/sq mi)
- OS grid reference: TQ105765
- Civil parish: n/a
- London borough: Hounslow
- Ceremonial county: Greater London
- Region: London
- Country: England
- Sovereign state: United Kingdom
- Post town: HOUNSLOW
- Postcode district: TW4, TW5
- Dialling code: 020
- Police: Metropolitan
- Fire: London
- Ambulance: London
- UK Parliament: Feltham and Heston
- London Assembly: South West

Cranford is a suburban area straddling the London Boroughs of Hillingdon and Hounslow. It is located 12.5 miles (20 km) west of Charing Cross and immediately east of Heathrow Airport, from which it is separated by the River Crane. A village till the mid-20th century, Cranford was developed with the building of major roads in its area.

== History ==
Its name came from Anglo-Saxon cran-ford = "ford of cranes" as at the time the word heron was not used for that bird and it covered an almost north–south rectangle lengthwise of 737 acres (2.98 km^{2}).

Before the Norman Conquest, the village was a small Saxon settlement in all senses completely surrounded by its open fields abutting the north of Hounslow Heath and was in Elthorne Hundred for troop-mustering and taxation purposes. The Domesday Book of 1086 records the manor of Cranford being given to a Norman baron, William Fitz Ansulf. By the 13th century, the main area of Cranford Park and House, the High Street and Bath Road had been given to the Knights Templar (followed by the knights of St John of Jerusalem) as Cranforde St John. The rest, Cranford le Mote, included the manor house and stretched in a narrow taper to the north of the present M4. The manors were reunited by purchase by Sir Roger Aston, an official to the King, 64 years after the Dissolution of the Monasteries and were bought by Sir Thomas Berkeley's widow Elizabeth in 1618. These stayed in the Berkeley family, who granted smallholdings over this period, until selling the house and Cranford Park to Hayes and Harlington Urban District Council in 1932, before being sold again to Middlesex County Council in 1935. The Park was then leased back to Hayes and Harlington Urban District Council who jointly administered it with Heston and Isleworth Borough Council, to whom Cranford had been transferred in 1934. For the history of the south of the present ward this was part of Hounslow Heath within Heston parish.

On 1 April 1934 the civil parish was abolished to form Heston and Isleworth, part also went to Harlington and East Bedfont. At the 1931 census (the last before the abolition of the parish), Cranford had a population of 765.

There was a ford to the north of the church on Watersplash Lane, but the main crossing was where the bridge replaced it on the Bath Road. The river was widened, probably in the 18th century, on either side of the Church Road to form two ornamental lakes. By 1820, there were at least four large ponds, three of which lay in the village on the edge of the common on the Southall Road. The fourth lay immediately east of the moat. By 1958, these had all been drained.

The village still has some distinguished houses, including Stansfield House, a 17th-century listed building. Cranford also has one of only two remaining "lock-ups" in the Metropolitan Police area, this one built in 1838 to hold drunks and vagrants overnight, before finding use as a mortuary for the parish council. The wider borough states that Cranford "was described for centuries as one of the smallest and prettiest villages in Middlesex".

The Berkeley family also gave their name to Berkeley Parade, where there are now many shops, largely convenience or regular services, which were built on remaining common land open fields on the south of the Bath Road in the 1930s – the "château-type" buildings with little slated turrets were branded "ingenious architectural fun" in the journal Architectural Review in 1939. The Parkway was built in 1959 as a bypass and this became a link to the 1960-1964-built M4 motorway cutting through the north end of the area. Both had considerable impact on the area. Much of Heston was developed in the early 1930s and this extended westward towards Cranford later, which also became developed to the west and south of the Parkway. The Parkway has cut Cranford in two, severing the high street into two sections, and along many sections there is not even a pavement for pedestrians though instead a green footpath alongside an inter-London trunk route.

== Topography and land use ==
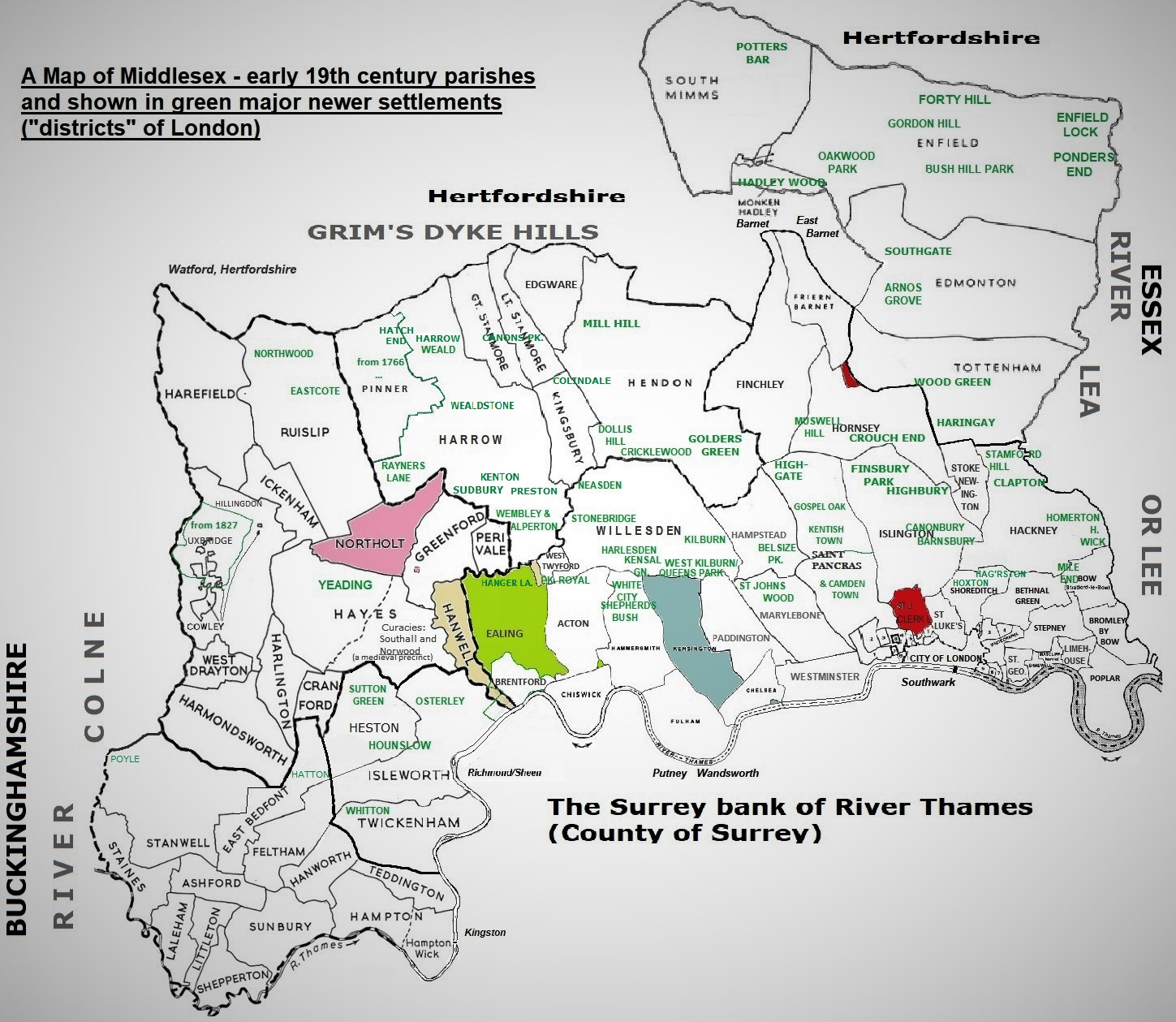
The extent of Cranford in the early 19th Century.

Cranford as a ward of Hounslow since 2002

Cranford remains on the eastern side of the River Crane and formerly included an opposing west field and old field, today housing in the Harlington part of Hayes, part of Cranford Park and an area of the hotels and car parks east of Heathrow Airport. The parish is drained by its one large stream that flows gently southwards past it and waters its relatively flat gravel subsoil, the surface being hardy loam. The community occupies the highest land in the borough, rising from 20m in the west to its peak of 30m around Heston. The remaining main green space other than Cranford Park is Rectory Farm. The London Borough recommends the expansive views across Rectory Farm as part of a walk along Bath Road; to the far side is low-rise housing in Heston. The most dominant urban type by area within the Cranford and Heston study area is by far the inter- and early postwar loose grid (type 2). In some parts the housing takes the form of single storey bungalows, some of which have unusual tall Dutch gable ends.

== The Cranford Agreement ==
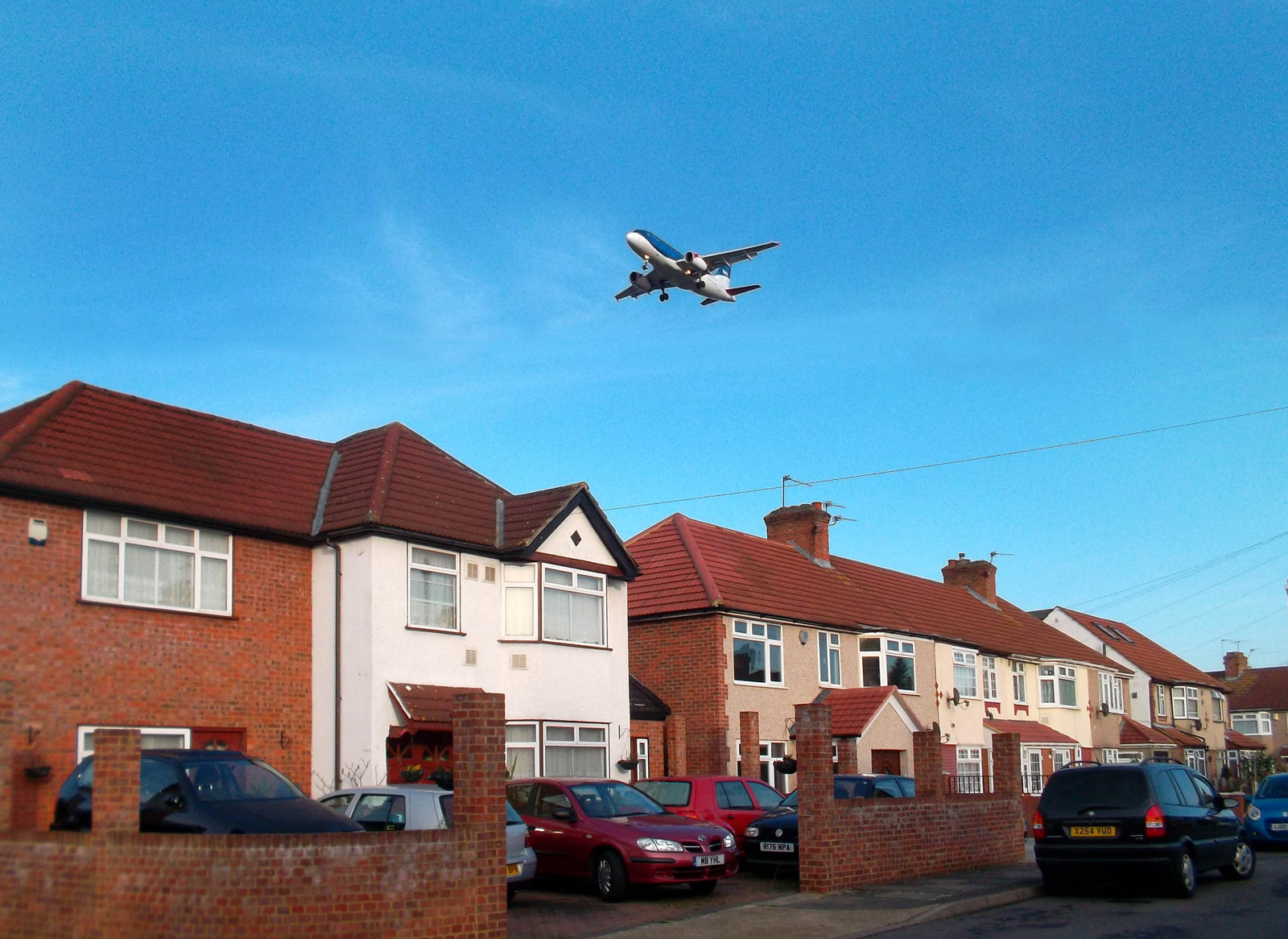
Cranford is directly below a major flight path.

The middle of the locality's position, directly below the flight path of the northern runway of Heathrow Airport led to a ministerial statement-backed undertaking by the airport operator: the Cranford Agreement given on 31 July 1952 at a meeting of the Cranford Residents' and District Amenities Association – as far as possible, the northern runway would not be used for landings or take-offs to the east. This meant that houses under the flight path would not have to suffer the noise from landings, and more especially, louder take-offs.

This was gradually watered down to a limited number of flights with government agreement. A study in an air transport white paper of December 2003 proposed that, since an additional runway at Heathrow could not come into operation before at least 2015–2020, further consideration ought to be given to the scope for using the two existing runways more; for example, through mixed-mode operations. Various runway operations in the 2010s decade have permitted this, with most operational hours compliant with the agreement as it stands which prohibits night flights and specifies the maximum number of flights per day over Cranford which is a restricted minority of flights.

== Amenities ==
=== Churches ===
The Anglican parish of Cranford St Dunstan with Holy Angels, has two churches in the Church of England. For the parish church of St Dunstan's in Cranford Park, see below. The second church, Holy Angels, is an Anglican church consistently providing a High Church (Anglo-Catholic) tradition of services. The current building, opened in 1970, is the third one to have been built in Cranford. The first, an iron mission hut, was built by Fr Maurice Child in 1935. It was on the site now occupied by Tesco Express on Bath Road. It burnt down in 1941 and was replaced a year later by a converted Romney hut. This second building burnt down in 1965. The current building, in Cranford High Street, was opened by Mary Lalle Foley-Berkeley, 17th Baroness Berkeley and Ronald, Bishop of Kensington, on 26 September 1970.

The Roman Catholic Church of Our Lady and St Christopher is at 32 High Street, Cranford.

==== St Dunstan's Church ====
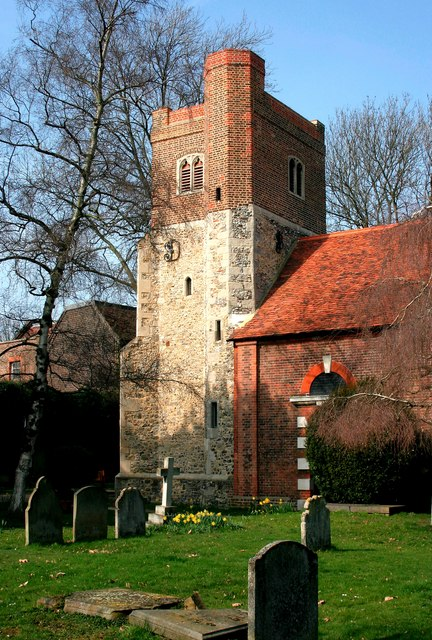
St Dunstan's Church, Cranford

St Dunstan's Church stands in Cranford Park, adjacent to the stable block of Cranford House. The oldest surviving part is its 15th-century tower. There was a priest at Cranford in 1086, when he held 1 virgate of land, so the Victoria County History states there was presumably a church. The benefice is a rectory – no secular church tithe appropriation ever took place in return for chancel upkeep, by an impropriator, which gives rise to the need to have a vicar. The advowson (right to appoint the priest) was medievally for over a century held by two religious orders, the Knights Templars and the Hospitallers. The tower and the nave survived a fire in 1710, and the repairs were paid for by Elizabeth, Dowager Countess of Berkeley in 1716.

Notable monuments in the church include a large wall monument to Sir Roger Aston (d. 1612) and his wife Mary (d. 1606), sculpted by William Cure the Younger; another to Elizabeth, Lady Berkeley (d. 1635), with a marble effigy by Nicholas Stone (both these monuments are listed by Historic England); and a mural tablet to Thomas Fuller (d. 1661), author of the Worthies of England, who was rector of Cranford.

The oldest bell in the church was cast in 1338 and is said to have chimed on every occasion of national importance since. One of Cranford's residents was the MP and writer (George Charles) Grantley (Fitzhardinge) Berkeley (d.1881), known for his violent behaviour. His brother, Earl Fitzhardinge, was the patron of the church, although convicted for criminal conversation (adultery): he died unmarried and without legitimate children.

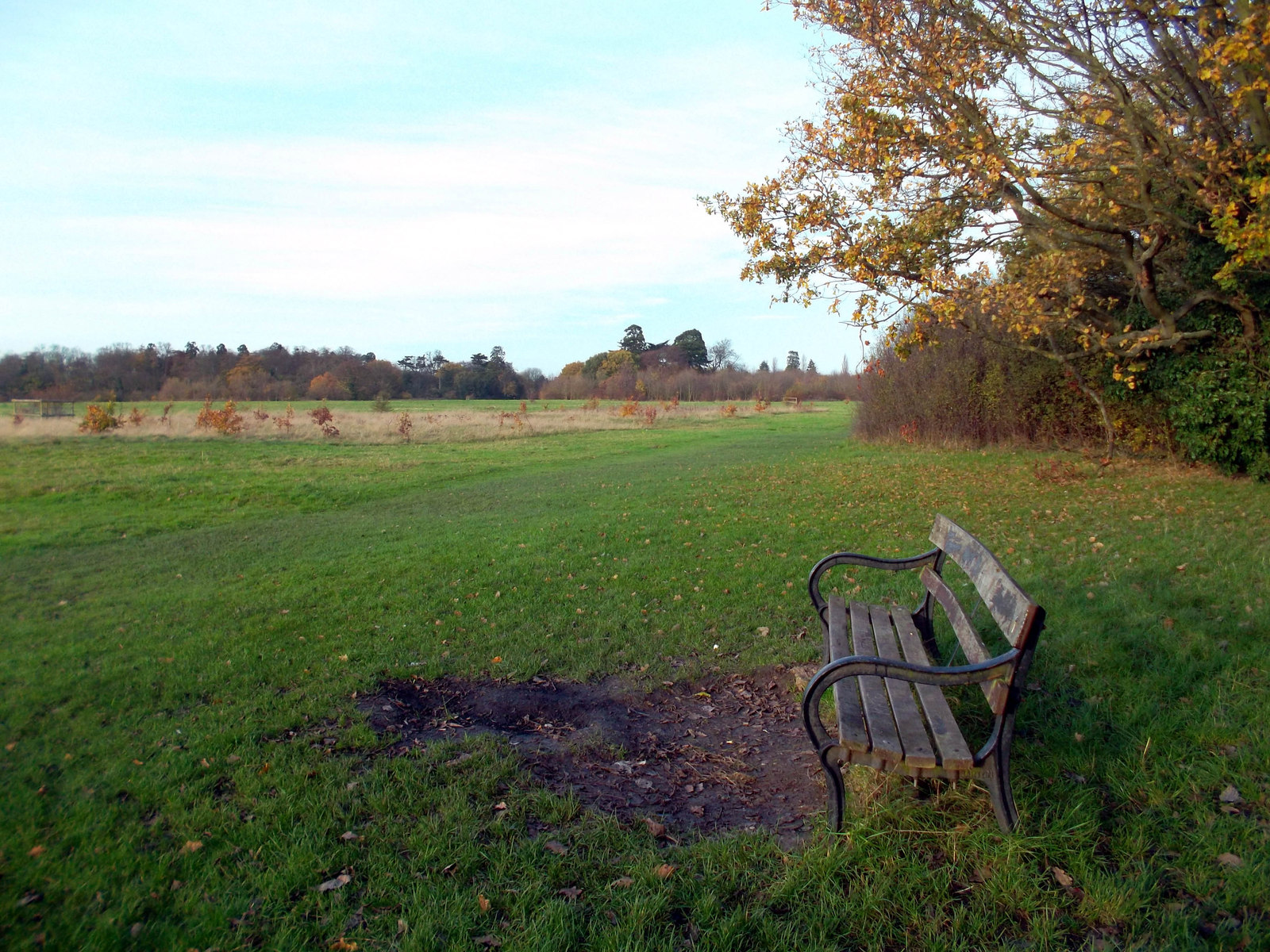
Cranford Park

=== Transport ===
Nearby stations include:

- Hatton Cross
- Hounslow West
- Hayes and Harlington

The A312 road ('The Parkway') runs through Cranford.

== Notable people ==
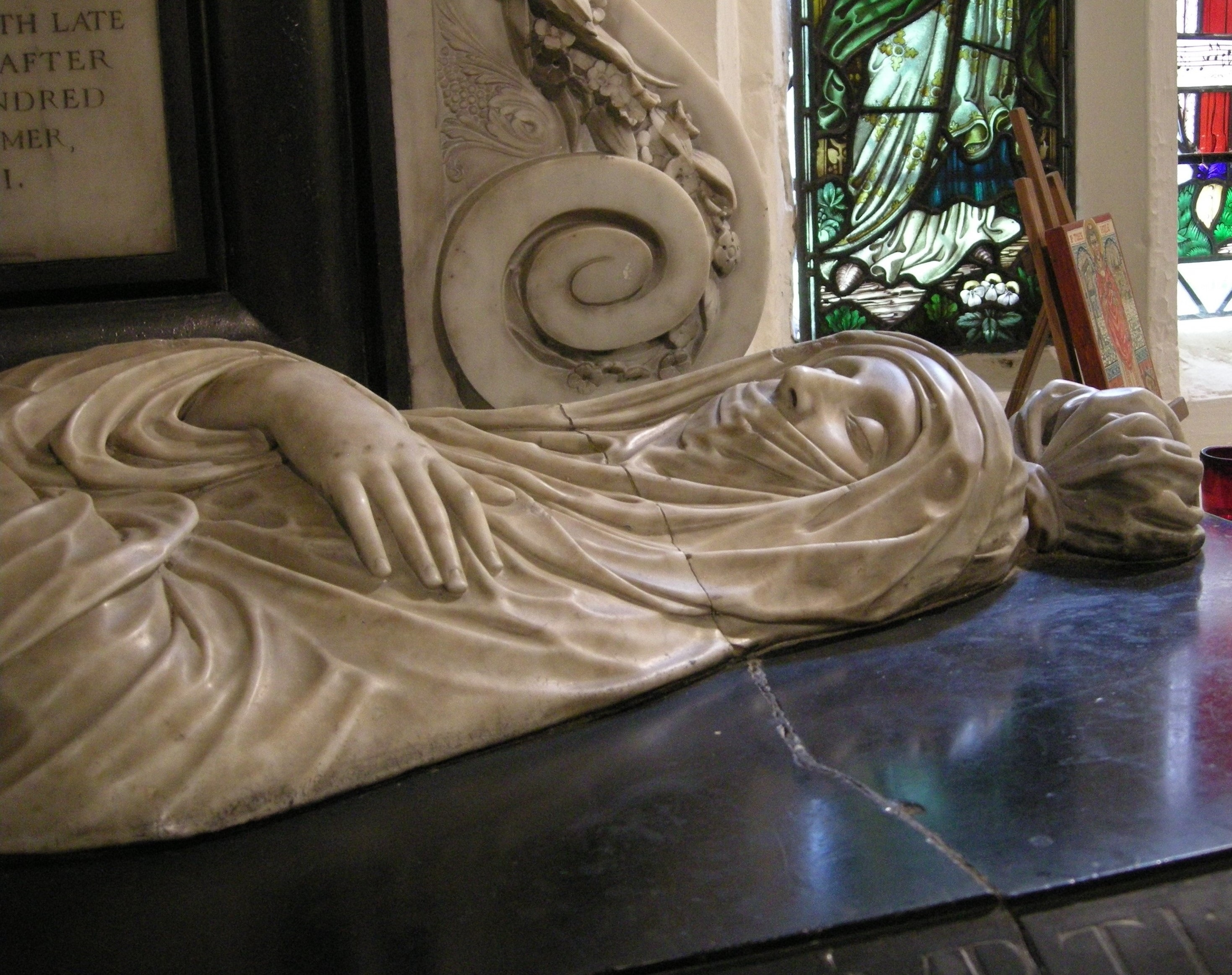
Tomb effigy of Elizabeth Carey, Lady Berkeley in St Dunstan's church

- Elizabeth Carey, Lady Berkeley, patron of the arts, bought the estate of Cranford in 1618, and died there in 1635.
- Ian Gillan, musician, grew up in Cranford.
- Tony Hancock, comedian, ashes are scattered at St Dunstan's Church, a memorial plaque marks the location.
- Charles Scarborough (1615–1694), royal physician and mathematician, is buried at Cranford; there is a monument to him in the parish church erected by his widow.
- Anthony Gueterbock, 18th Baron Berkeley (Lab), civil engineer and parliamentarian, sold the last family land in the ward and nominated "of Cranford, London" to be his territorial designation of his life peerage.

== Demography and housing ==
2011 Census Homes
Ward	Detached	Semi-detached	Terraced	Flats and apartments	Caravans/temporary/mobile homes/houseboats	Shared between households
Cranford	246	1,248	1,096	1,333	1	6

2011 Census Households
Ward	Population	Households	% Owned outright	% Owned with a loan	hectares
Cranford	12,330	3,930	21	23	272

== See also ==
Media related to Cranford, London at Wikimedia Commons
