= Nicholas Stone =

English sculptor and architect (c. 1586–1647)

Engraving of the now lost monument to Nicholas Stone (centre) and his son in St Martin-in-the-Fields. Both died in 1647.

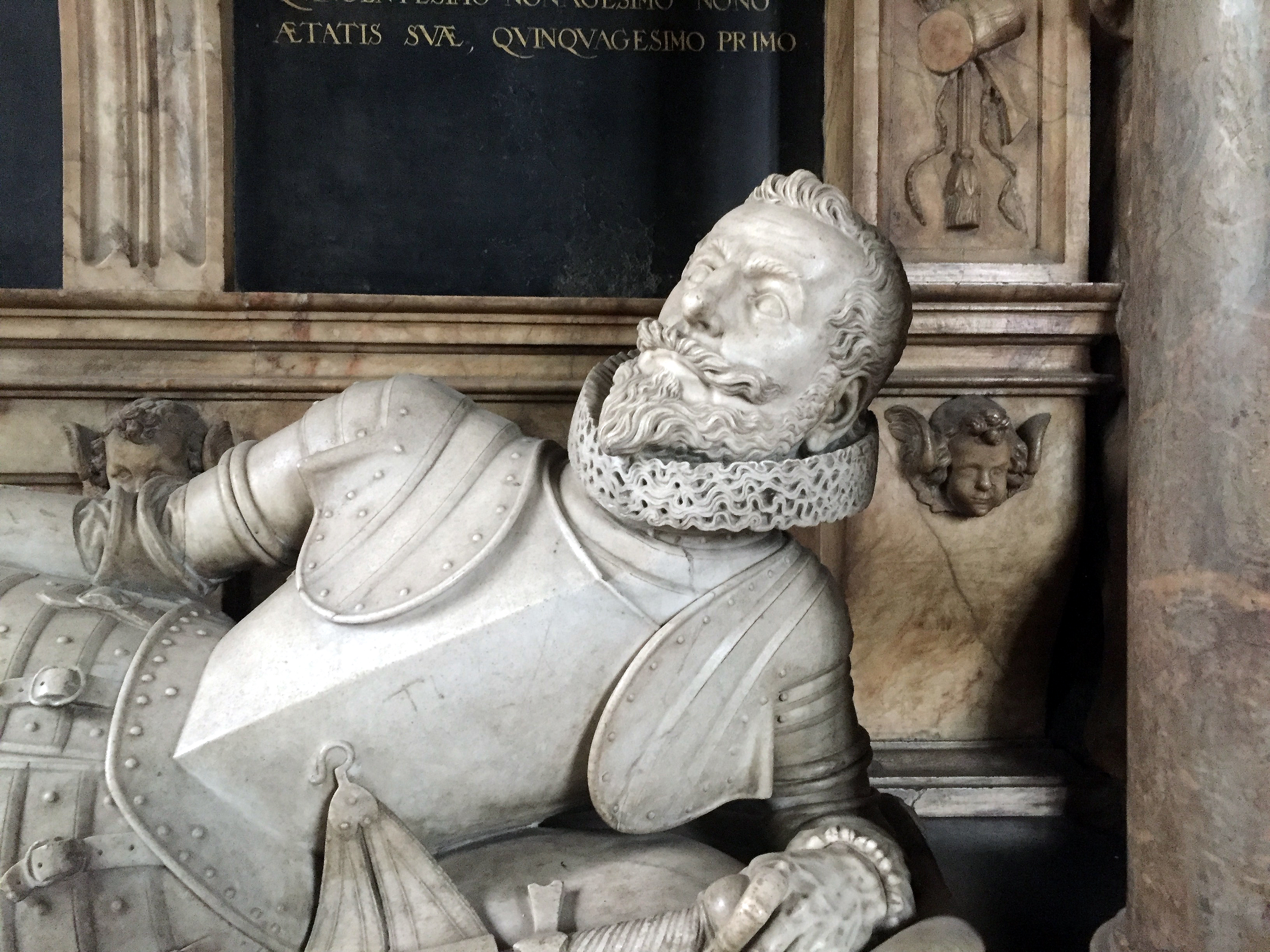
Tomb of Sir Charles Morison the elder, Watford St Mary

Sir Moyle Finch's tomb, 1616, Victoria and Albert Museum

Nicholas Stone (1586/87 – 24 August 1647) was an English sculptor and architect. In 1619 he was appointed master-mason to James I, and in 1626 to Charles I. He is not to be confused with his son Nicholas Stone Junior (1618–1647), also a sculptor.

During his career he was the mason responsible for not only the building of Inigo Jones' Banqueting House, Whitehall, but the execution of elaborate funerary monuments for some of the most prominent of his era that were avant-garde by English standards. As an architect he worked in the Baroque style providing England with some of its earliest examples of the style that was not to find favour in the country for another sixty years, and then only fleetingly. Much of his work, and in particular most surviving elements, were gateways or porticos, either stand-alone, or added to older buildings.

He worked in a context where most sculptors in stone were "mason-sculptors", in modern terms combining sculpture with architecture. The quality of his sculptural work is variable, probably because much of it was done by his workshop colleagues. Netherlandish influence was dominant in English sculpture, and in Stone's training, but the importation of classical antiquities by collectors influenced his later work. There continued to be few sculpture commissions other than tombs in England during his career, and he developed the English types of the previous century.

Evaluated today, Stone's architecture combines the sophisticated classicism of Jones with an uncouth Artisan Mannerism popular at the time. The architectural historian, Howard Colvin's assessment of Stone's architecture is that he "partly absorbed the new classicism of Inigo Jones, but without accepting its full discipline and without rejecting some of the mannerist or baroque features that he had learned in London and Amsterdam. The result was a vernacular classical architecture, of which regrettably little remains today." Stone, as an architect, was at the cutting edge of modernity, his work in the Baroque style while Inigo Jones' was still promoting Palladianism was at odds with contemporary fashion, it was to be almost fifty years from Stone's death before William Talman's Chatsworth House, completed in 1696, was to be hailed as England's first Baroque house, while England's truest Baroque house, Castle Howard, was not completed until 1712.

== Early life ==
Nicholas Stone was born in 1586, the son of a quarryman of Woodbury, near Exeter. He was first apprenticed to Isaac James, a Dutch-born London mason working in Southwark, London. When the sculptor Hendrik de Keyser (1567–1621), master mason to the City of Amsterdam, visited London in 1606, Stone was introduced to him and contracted to work for him in Holland, where he married de Keyser's daughter and worked with his son Pieter. Stone is thought to have made the portico to the Zuiderkerk in Amsterdam. In 1613 he returned to London with Bernard Janssens, a fellow pupil of de Keyser and settled in Long Acre, St Martin-in-the-Fields, where he established a large practice and workshops and soon became the leading English sculptor of funeral monuments.

== Career ==
Stone owed his early success in London in part to Inigo Jones, the King's Surveyor. In 1616 Stone was contracted by the depute-treasurer of Scotland Gideon Murray to decorate the chapel at Holyrood Palace with a wooden screen, stalls, and organ case. The carving was done in London and Stone came to Scotland in July 1616 to oversee the installation. He sub-contracted the painting and gilding work to Matthew Goodrick. John Chamberlain wrote that Inigo Jones was in charge of the project. This involvement with the royal works led to the spectacular contract for building Jones's Banqueting House, that placed him in the forefront of London builders.

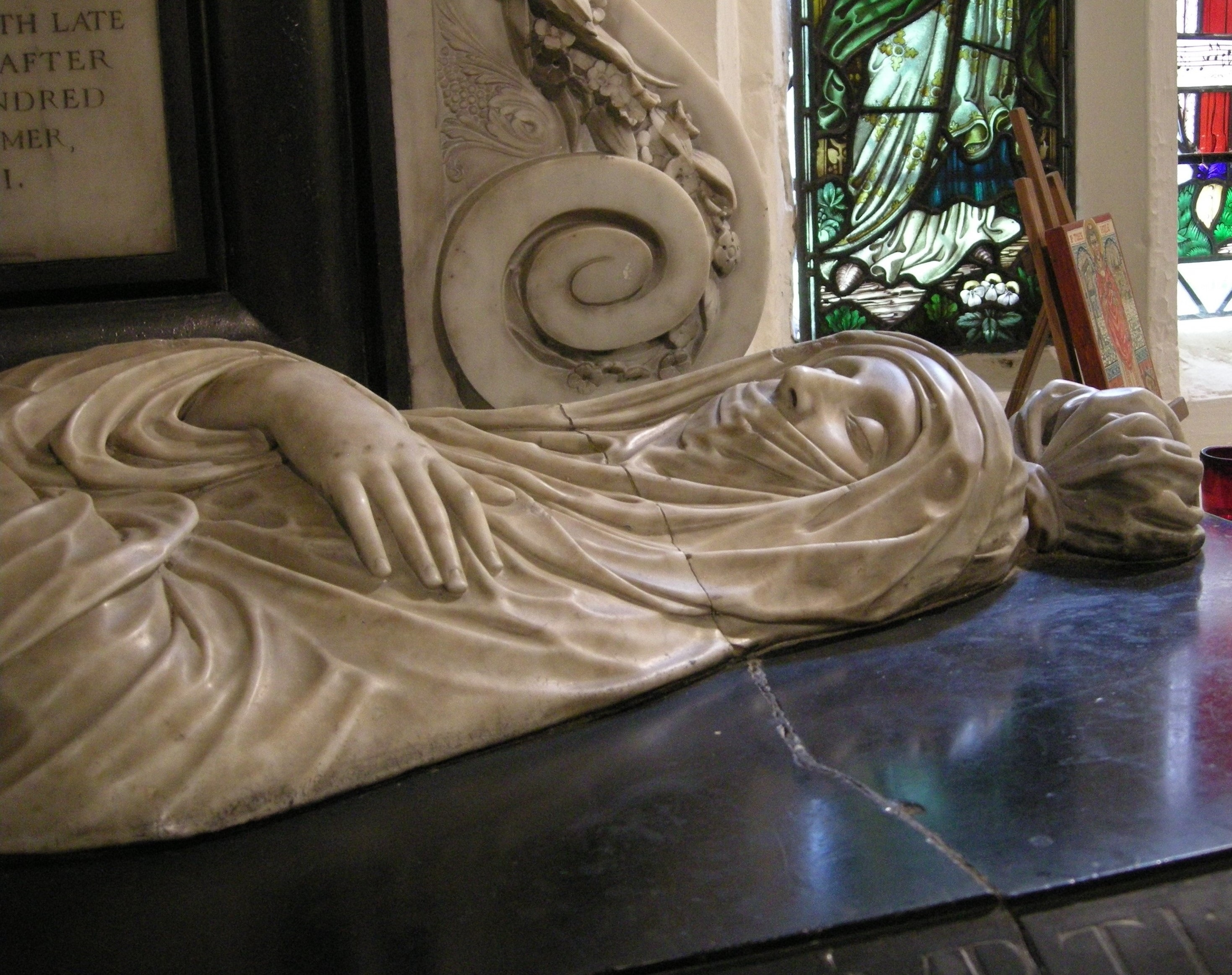
Elizabeth, Lady Berkeley, Cranford

Throughout his life, Stone recorded his work in two journals; These are his autograph notebook (covering the years 1614–1641) and his accounts book (covering 1631–1642). These journals record all his works and patrons, and provide in unequalled detail documentation of the career of an architect (then known as a surveyor) of the period. A list of works by Stone's relative John Stoakes includes some work known not to have been designed by Stone, including Inigo Jones' Banqueting House, Whitehall, but permits some attributions, noted below. This amount of information available concerning Stone has led to his importance to English architecture often being overstated. However, the documentation does clearly prove that by 1629 he was England's foremost sculptor and that by the end of his life he held comparable status in architecture. His first appointment in the royal Office of Works was as "master mason and architect" to Windsor Castle in April 1626; in 1632 he succeeded William Cure as Master Mason to the Crown.

=== Sculpture ===
The poet John Donne posed in his shroud while still alive; 1631 effigy in St Paul's Cathedral.

While Stone's London workshop received commissions for garden statuary, perhaps including the sculptures in Isaac de Caus' grotto at Woburn Abbey, recently attributed to Nicholas Stone, and for domestic items such as door-cases and chimneypieces, the vast majority of Stone's surviving sculptures are funerary monuments, and it is by these that the quality of his sculpture is today judged. Stone was greatly influenced by the new classicizing fashion for art derived from the Italian Renaissance and the Roman Arundel marbles, and this is reflected in two of his works, both in Westminster Abbey, the memorial to Sir John Holles and his brother Francis both dressed Roman armour reflecting classical influence, something new to England. It has been said that until this time English sculpture resembled that described by the Duchess of Malfi: "the figure cut in alabaster kneels at my husband's tomb."

A taste for realism, in part the product of his training in the Netherlands, informs the floor tomb of Sir William Curle (died 1617) in the church at Hatfield, Hertfordshire; Sir William is sculpted lying in his grave coat, his knees drawn up in his last agonies: "in its sad and poignant realism," observes Colin Platt, "it was as much a culture shock as the Whitehall Banqueting House".

Two prominent funeral monuments, Stone's box tombs in Westminster Abbey served as influential models far into the 18th century for many monuments in the metropolis and in the country: they were for Sir George Villiers and his wife, the Countess of Buckingham (c 1631), and for Lionel Cranfield, Earl of Middlesex, and his wife (after 1638).

Stone's 1631 monument to Dr John Donne, at St Paul's Cathedral is considered to be among his most remarkable. It depicts the poet, standing upon an urn, dressed in a winding cloth, rising for the moment of judgement. This depiction, Donne's own idea, was sculpted from a painting for which the poet posed.

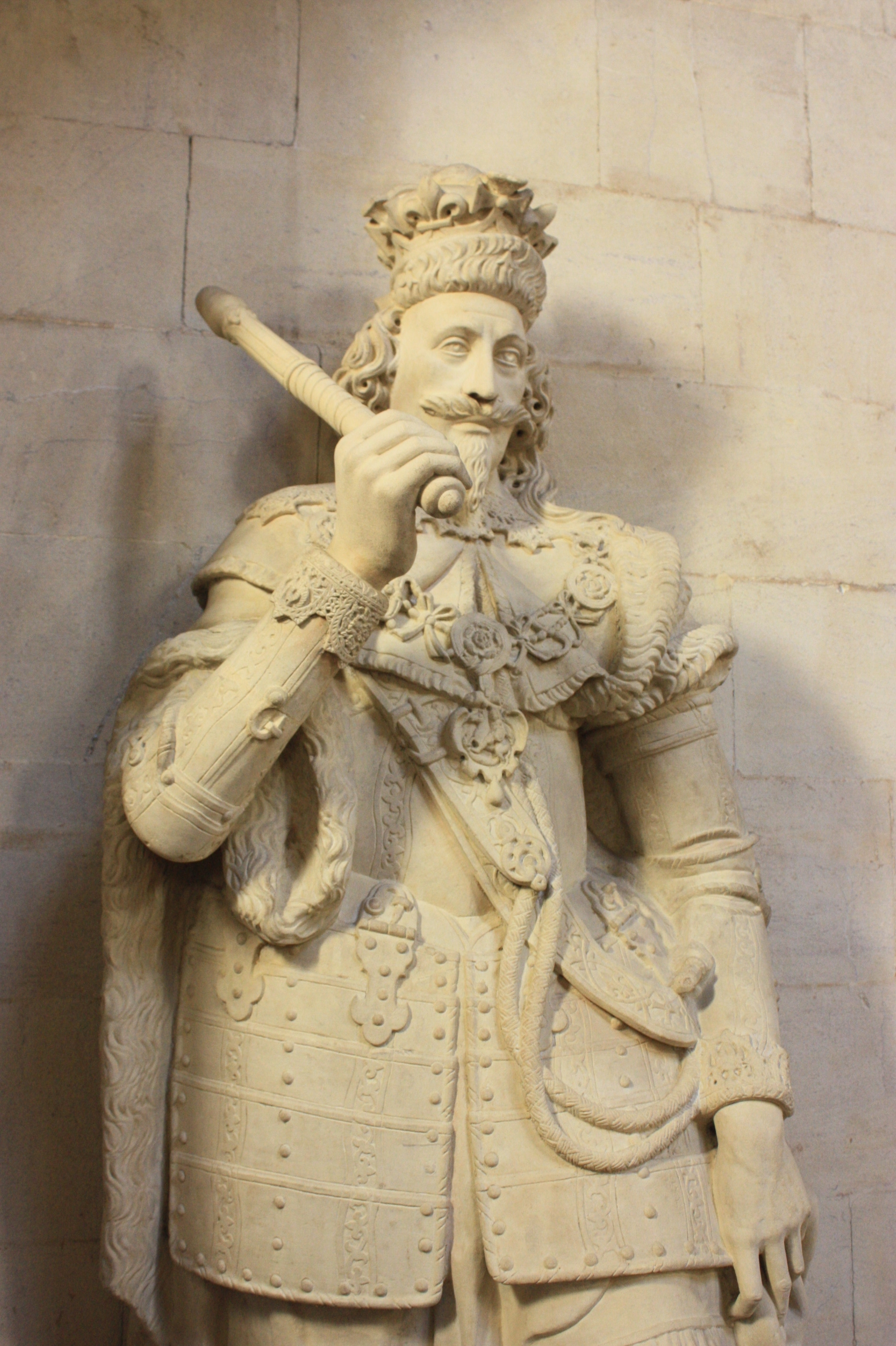
Charles I , Guildhall, London

Another of Stone's finest works is the effigy of Elizabeth, Lady Carey in the parish church at Stowe Nine Churches, Northamptonshire, is considered one of his masterpieces. While other surviving examples of his monuments to the dead include those to: Sir Francis Vere, Earl of Middlesex; Sir Dudley Digges at Chilham church, Kent; Henry Howard, 1st Earl of Northampton, in Dover Castle (removed to Greenwich); Sir Thomas Sutton, at the London Charterhouse (with Janssens); Sir Robert Drury at Hawstead church, Suffolk; Sir William Stonhouse at Radley church, Berkshire (now Oxfordshire); Sir Thomas Bodley at Merton College, Oxford (1612-May 1615), with his bust in an oval niche flanked by pilasters of stacked books; Thomas, Lord Knivett, at Stanwell, Middlesex (1623); Sir William Pope, in Wroxton church, near Banbury; Sir Nicholas Bacon, in Redgrave church, Suffolk (with Janssens), the composer Orlando Gibbons, in Canterbury Cathedral (1626); and Sir Julius Caesar, in St Helens, Bishopsgate.

Of Stone's non-sepulchre sculpture precious little remains: a chimneypiece, from 1616, at Newburgh Priory depicting mythological standing deities in bas-relief; two crumbling garden statues at Blickling Hall and a collection of statues in good repair at Wilton House. The Wilton House statues, as at Woburn, indicate the close working relationship that Stone had with both Inigo Jones and Isaac de Caus both of whom worked on the design of Wilton.

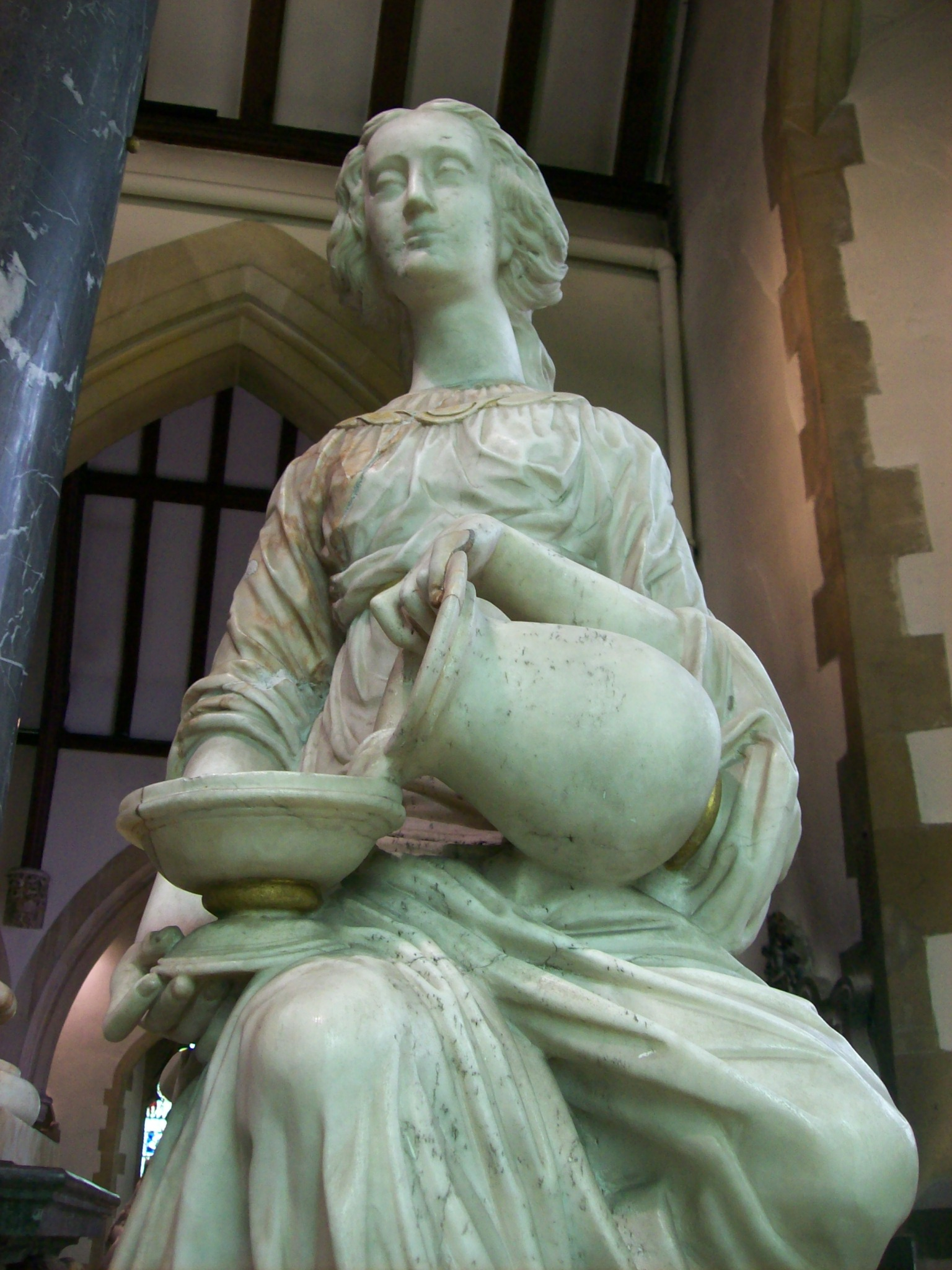
Temperance on the Digges Memorial, 1631, Chilham, Kent

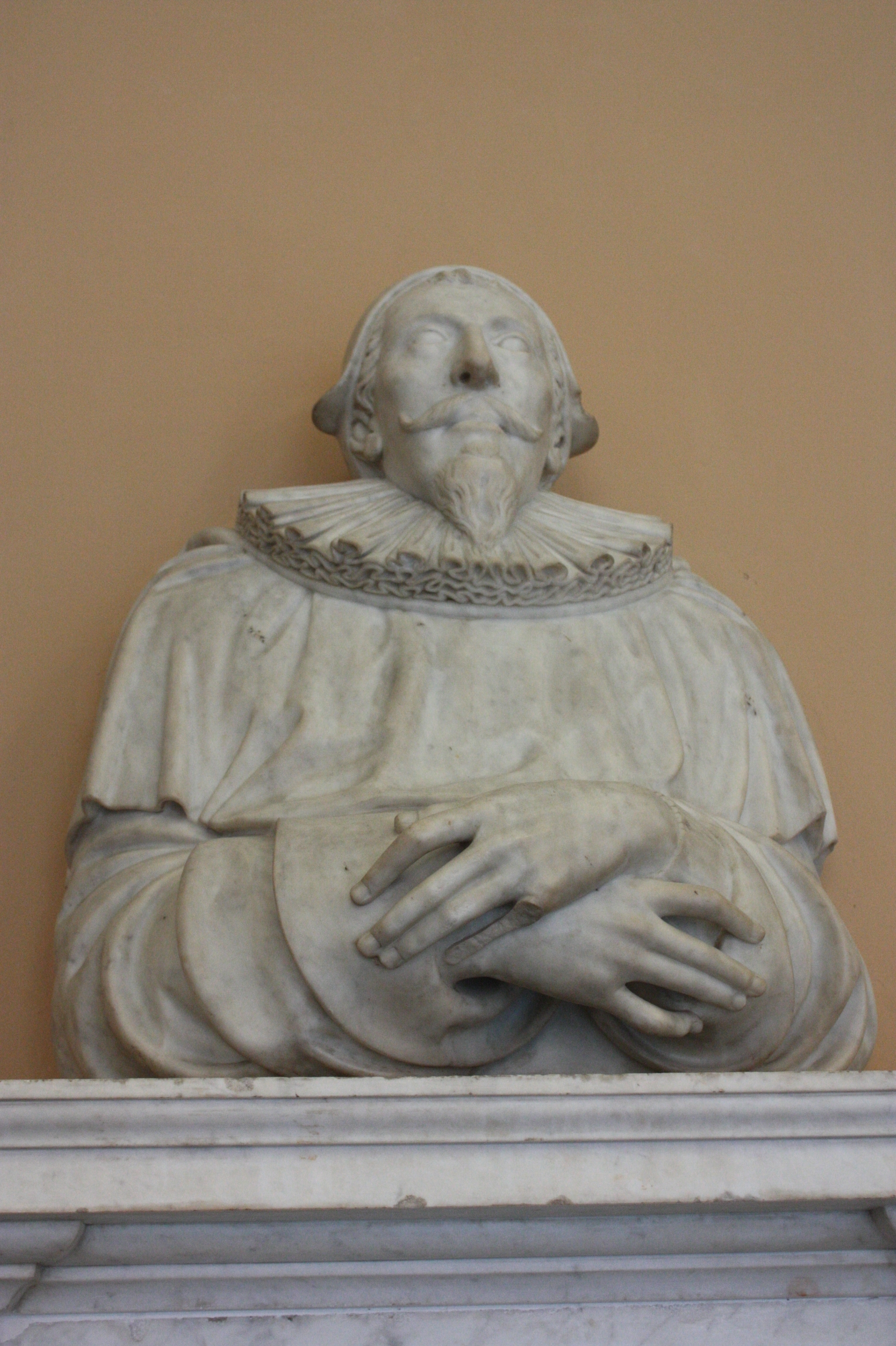
Monument to Heneage Finch, 1632, now Victoria and Albert Museum

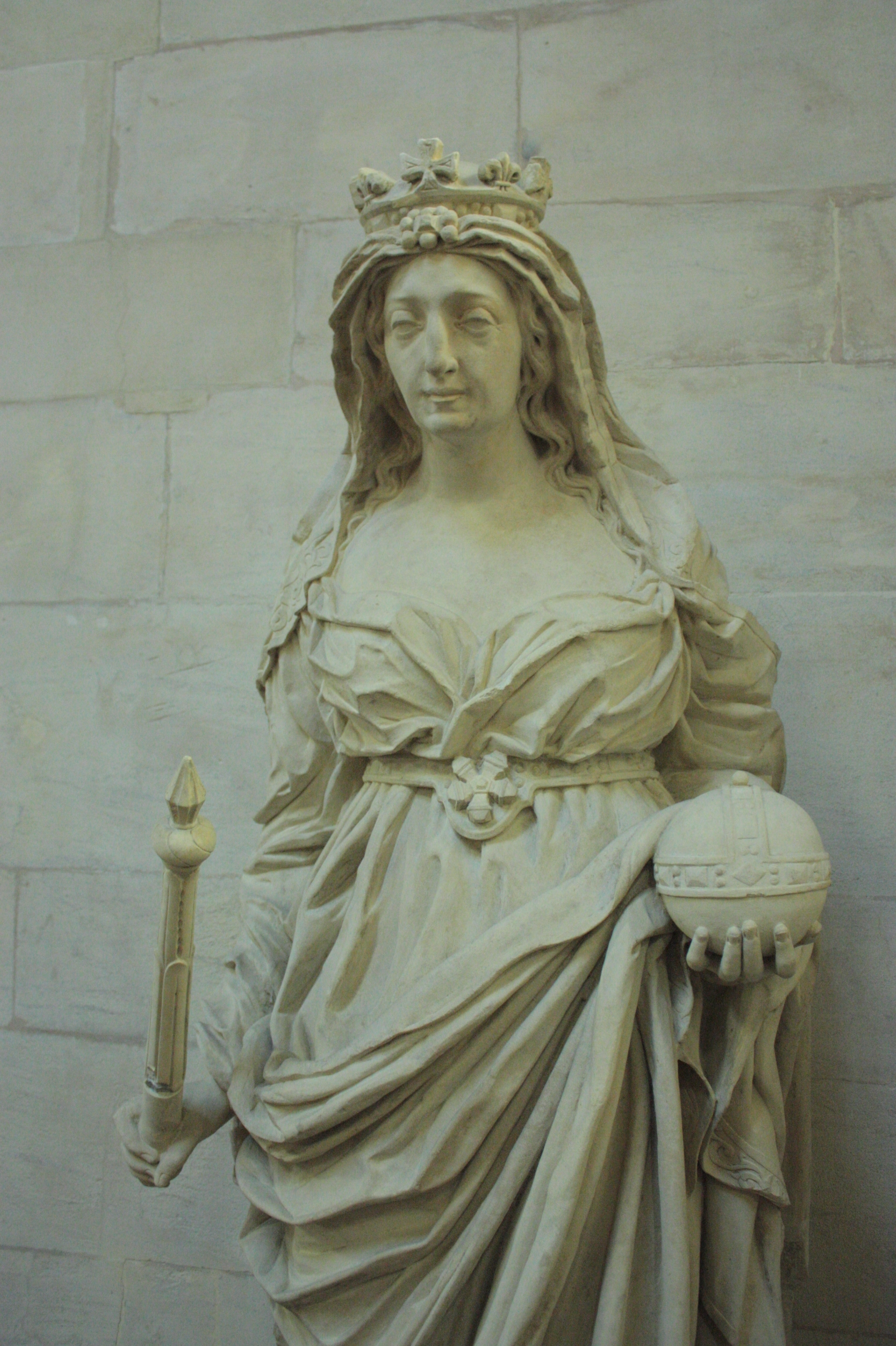
Elizabeth I, Guildhall, London

Detail, Austin memorial, Southwark Cathedral

Statue of Sir George Holles, Westminster Abbey

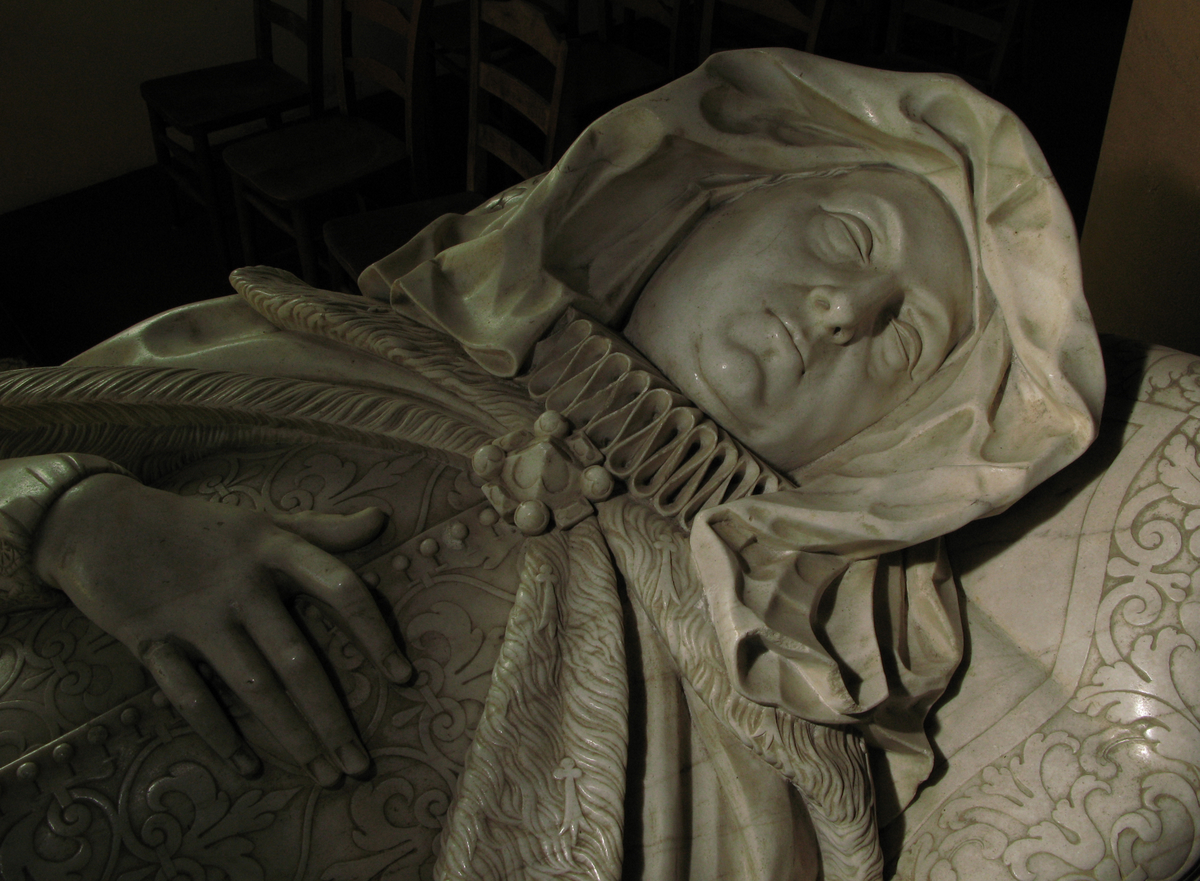
Effigy, Lady Elizabeth Carey

== Patrons ==
=== Sir William Paston at Oxnead ===
A consistent private patron over a period of many years was Sir William Paston, who was modernizing his Elizabethan seat at Oxnead, Norfolk. Paston commissioned from Stone the monument to his mother (died 1629) in the church at Paston, the family's ancient seat; in Stone's note-book, the price came to £340, and Stone remarks that in setting it up he was "very extreordenerly entertayned thar" by the genial Paston. The simpler monument by Stone of Sir Edmund Paston (died 1633), without the effigy and achievement of arms, stands beside his wife's.

Oxnead was emptied of its treasures, sold off and all but demolished, but in 1809 its long-term tenant, John Adey Repton, made a conjectural drawing of it, based on the foundations and recollections of local inhabitants, which was illustrated in W.H. Bartlett and John Britten's Architectural Antiquities of Great Britain 1809, following p. 98. his view is centered on the terraced parterres, in the lowest of which, he says, stood the fountain of two tiers of bold opposed scrolls supporting a shallow basin, re-erected after the Oxnead sale at the rival Norfolk house, Blickling Hall. Repton's drawing showed the banqueting house constructed as a wing; its style was so advanced for its date in the 1630s that the younger Repton concluded that it had been "erected by the first Earl of Yarmouth, to receive King Charles II. and his attendants, who visited Oxnead in 1676; it was a lofty building, with sash-windows, called the Banquetting-room. Underneath this was a vaulted apartment, which was called the Frisketting room, probably from the Italian 'frescati', a cool grotto." Repton's drawing shows a building of three bays articulated by a giant order, with large rectangular windows over the basement windows and oval windows, recalled by local people, in a mezzanine above.

Stone provided a magnificent chimneypiece that cost £80 and another for the banqueting house, a balcony with two door surrounds and an architrave in Portland stone, a "copper branch"— probably a cast bronze candelabrum— weighing 166 pounds, and an achievement of the Paston arms. There were many miscellaneous carved furnishings, picture frames and stands for tables, balustrades and paving-stones, and busts of Marcus Aurelius and Faustina. For the gardens he provided figures of Venus and Cupid, Jupiter, Flora, and, to guard the garden front door, a large figure of Cerberus on a pedestal, all long gone, but Stone's Hercules— and perhaps others— are preserved in the gardens at Blickling. In the garden Stone erected a large iron pergola painted green, surmounted by eight gilded balls. In 1638, he sent his son, Nicholas Stone the younger, to Italy, whence there returned an elevation of a new garden house just built in the Villa Ludovisi, Rome, "for Mr Paston", and marbles, architectural books (Vignola, Vitruvius, and Maggi's Le fontane di Roma), and plaster casts sent home from Livorno. With the onset of the Civil War, commissions from Sir William abruptly ceased in 1642; five years later, his outstanding account was settled, for £24.

=== Christopher Hatton at Kirby Hall ===
Christopher Hatton was rebuilding Kirby Hall in the same decade. For him Stone provided "6 Emperors heads, with their pedestals cast in Plaster, moulded from the Antiques" (£7 10s), a "head of Apollo, fairly carved in Portland stone, almost twice as big as life" and "one head carved in stone of Marcus Aurelius" still preserved set in the north front above the loggia (each £4).

== Architecture ==
=== York House water gate ===
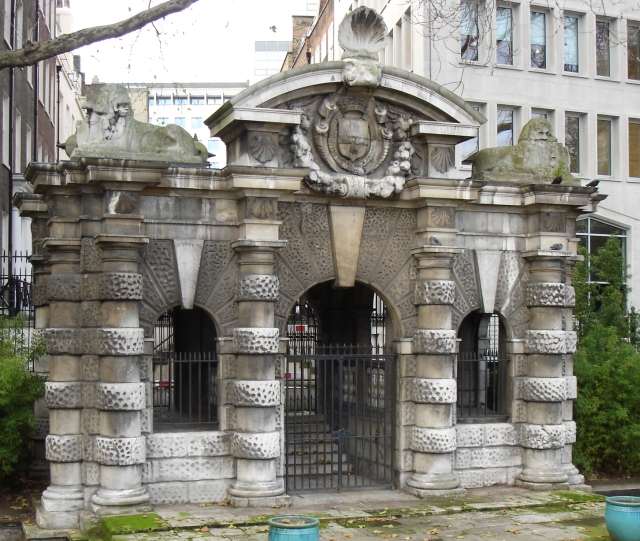
York House water gate, often attributed to Stone

Sebastiano Serlio's 16th-century design for a rustic gate, which flouts all conventions of classical architecture. Nicholas Stone was influenced by such designs.

York House, London, was one of the great houses of the aristocracy which lined the Thames during the 17th century. During the 1620s, it was acquired by the royal favourite George Villiers, 1st Duke of Buckingham. The Duke rebuilt and modernised the house and, in 1623, commissioned the building of a water gate to give access to the Thames from the gardens, at that time the river being a favoured method of transport on London. With the Banqueting House, it is one of the few surviving reminders in London of the Italianate court style of Charles I. The water gate is believed to have been designed by Stone. However, like the Banqueting House, the design of the water gate has been attributed to Inigo Jones, with Stone only being credited with the building. It has also been attributed to the diplomat and painter Sir Balthazar Gerbier.

The similarity of the architecture to the Danby Gate (below) and its bold vermicelli rusticated design in a confident Serlian manner indicate that it is by the same hand as the Danby Gate itself.

Today, of the York House complex, only the water gate survives; the house was demolished in 1670 and the site redeveloped as Villiers Street. The creation of the Thames embankment in the 19th century caused the gate to be marooned 150 yards (137 m) from the river.

The water gate was restored during the 1950s.

=== The Danby Gateway, Oxford ===
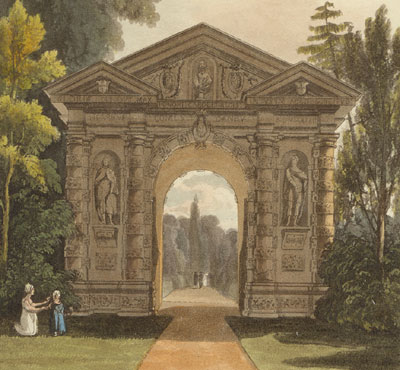
The Danby gateway to the University of Oxford Botanic Garden built in 1633.

The Danby gateway to the University of Oxford Botanic Garden is one of three entrances to the garden designed by Nicholas Stone between 1632 and 1633. In this highly ornate arch, Stone ignored the new simple classical Palladian style currently fashionable, which had just been introduced to England from Italy by Inigo Jones, and drew his inspiration from an illustration in Serlio's book of archways.

The gateway consists of three bays, each with a pediment. The largest and central bay, containing the segmented arch is recessed, causing its larger pediment to be partially hidden by the flanking smaller pediments of the projecting lateral bays.

The stone work is heavily decorated being bands of alternating vermicelli rustication and plain dressed stone. The pediments of the lateral bays are seemingly supported by circular columns which frame niches containing statues of Charles I and Charles II in classical pose. The tympanum of the central pediment contains a segmented niche containing a bust of The 1st Earl of Danby, who founded the garden in 1621 and commissioned the gateways.

=== Porch of St Mary the Virgin, Oxford ===
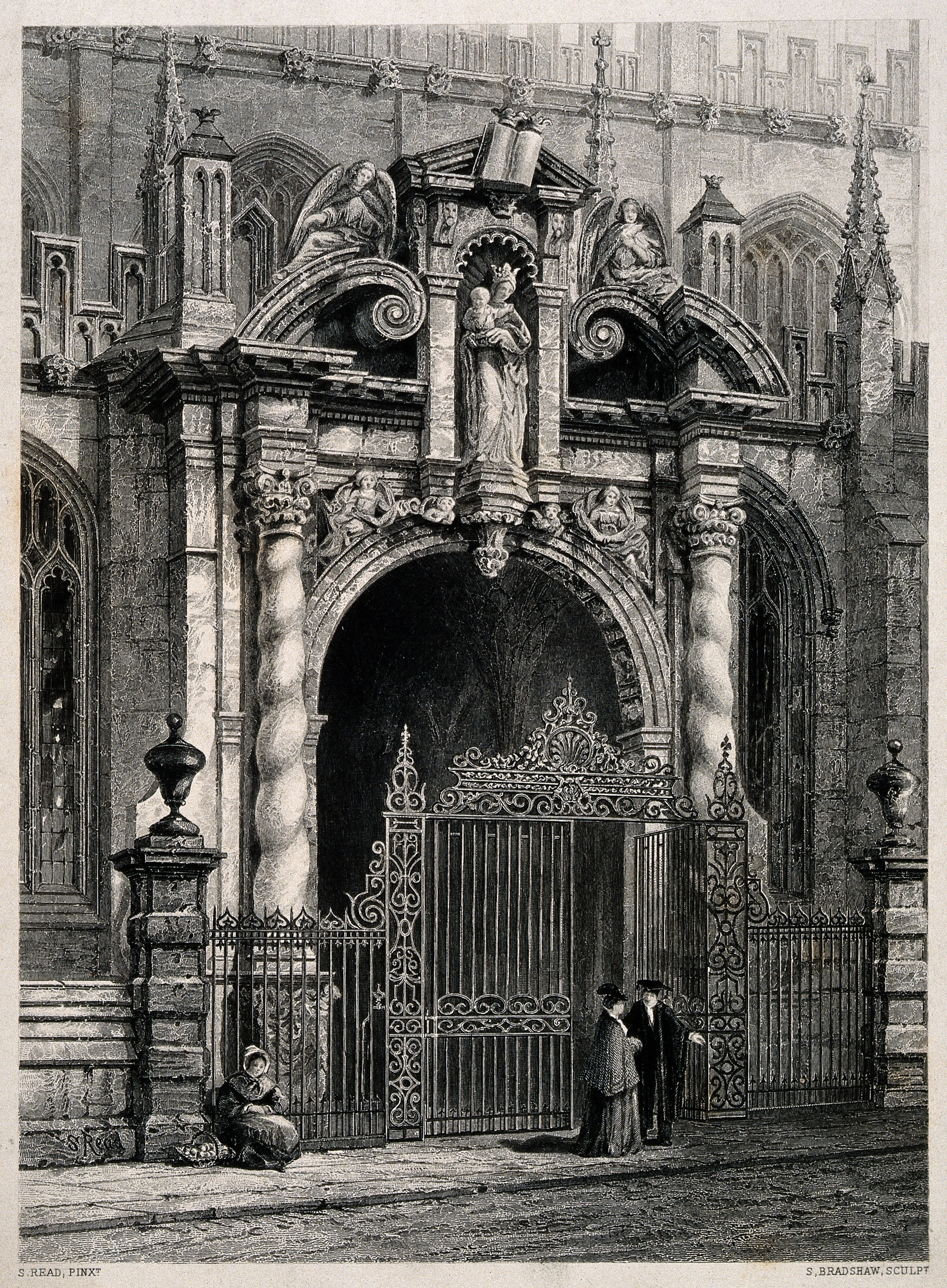
Nicholas Stone's Baroque porch at the Church of St Mary the Virgin, Oxford. Designed 1637.

In 1637, Stone designed a new entrance porch for the University Church of St Mary the Virgin, Oxford, this was one of his most spectacular works, in a European baroque design. The porch's heavy Baroque is quite unlike the eventual form the style was later to take in England. A huge scrolled pediment is supported by a pair of massive solomonic columns, an ancient architectural feature revived, in Italy, as a feature of the Baroque, and used most notably, as Stone would have been aware, for the St. Peter's Baldachin at St. Peter's Basilica in Rome, which has been completed by Bernini just four years earlier.

The obvious European, and thus Catholic, design of the porch was later to cause problems for the porch's patron Archbishop Laud because at the centre of the scrolled pediment was placed a statue of the Virgin and Child, a composition considered to be Roman Catholic idolatry, and later used against the Archbishop at his trial for treason in 1641 following the grand Remonstrance. Today, the statue is still bears the bullet holes cause when it was fired upon by Cromwellian soldiers.

=== Goldsmith's Hall ===
Stone designed and built Goldsmiths' Hall, Foster Lane, in 1635–38, which has provided an example of the manner in which Inigo Jones' ideas on architecture were disseminated in England. Jones himself advised the Goldsmiths' Company not to further patch its medieval fabric but build it anew.

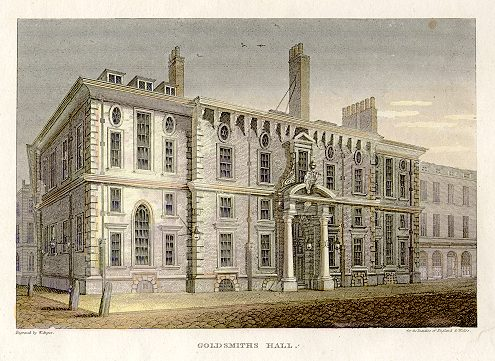
Goldsmiths Hall circa 1814. It was rebuilt following the Great Fire of London of 1666.

Stone's appointment as surveyor in charge of all the workmen in the design and erection of the new hall, came after a committee of the company had voted on competitive plans offered by ad hoc partnerships of workmen, appears to be the first instance outside the King's works in which a "surveyor", the predecessor of an architect, was engaged to oversee every detail, a process that seems to have been unfamiliar to the members of the Goldsmiths' Company. The company's official minutes record the detailed designs, vetted by Inigo Jones, that he drew up, not merely the "plotts" or floor plans and street and courtyard elevations but the "Patterne of the greate gate" in Foster Lane and patterns for the ceiling, wainscoting and the screen in the Great Hall and wainscot panelling in the parlour and the great chamber above it. His surveillance over workmen who found themselves working in a new manner, to which their apprenticeships had not accustomed them, can be sensed in his notation concerning Cornbury Park, where he contracted to "dereckt all the workmen and mak all thar moldes", providing correctly classical profiles for mouldings for carpenters and plasterers. His fee there of £1000 suggested to John Newman that he combined with the surveyorship considerable mason's work.

The placement of windows in the Hall's main facade show that Stone was ahead of his time in plans, smaller windows indicate the existence of mezzanine floors, such as those that exist at Easton Neston and Kinross, these housed small informal rooms, servant's rooms and rooms for housing closestools all features which were not common place until the advent of England's brief Baroque period which began in the 1690s. When servant's became confined out of sight to their own designated areas rather than sharing rooms with their employers. This was an important milestone in English domestic design. Another strong Baroque feature of Goldsmith's Hall was the massive porch, rather than a more Palladian portico, similar, but more restrained in design than that of St Mary the Virgin in Oxford, it is crowned by a broken segmented pediment - again, a strong Baroque feature.

Stone's Goldsmith's Hall was burnt to a standing shell in the Great Fire of London, rebuilt, and eventually demolished in 1829.

=== Lesser architectural commissions ===
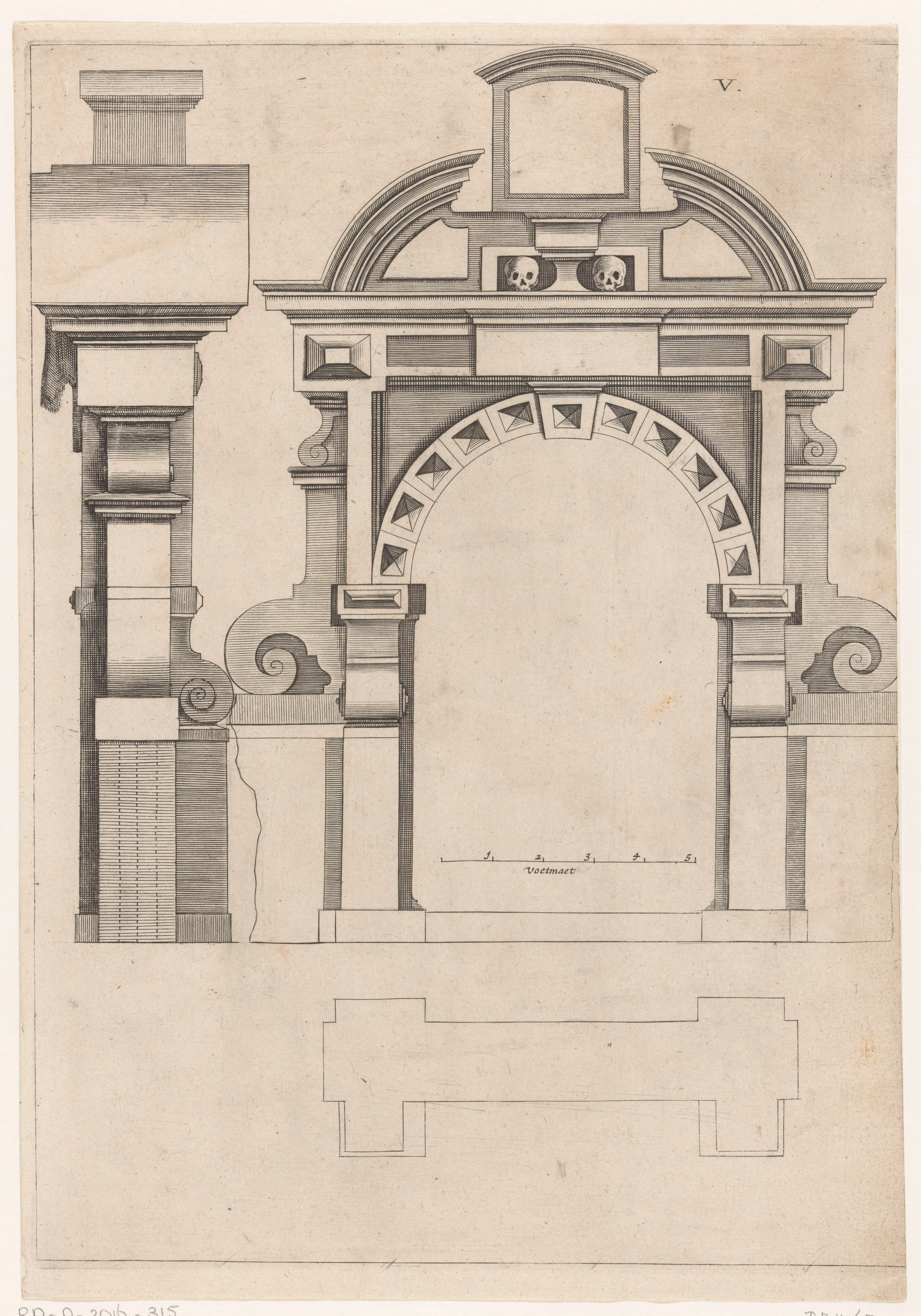
Portico to the cemetery of the Zuiderkerk, attributed to Nicholas Stone

Stone also designed Digges chapel, Chilham church, Kent, for Sir Dudley Digges to contain his monument to Lady Digges (1631, demolished); Cornbury House, Oxfordshire, partly rebuilt by Stone 1632-33 (altered); Copt Hall, Essex, 1638-39 (demolished in 1748). He worked for Mary, Countess of Home at her London townhouse in Aldersgate and also planned a tomb for her at Dunglass in Scotland.

== Private and political life ==
In 1613 Stone married Mayken de Keyser, the daughter of his master, Hendrick de Keyser. The year after his marriage Stone returned to England with his wife, settling in the parish of St Martin-in-the-Fields, Westminster, where they remained throughout their lives. The marriage produced three sons: John (1620–1667), a sculptor; Henry Stone (1616–1653) an artist most notable for his copies of Van Dyck and Nicholas (1618–1647), a sculptor, who worked under Bernini in Rome.

The outbreak of the civil war put an end to Stone's career, and he was to personally suffer. Like Inigo Jones, he was seen by the Puritans as a royal architect; his son, John, fought for the Royalists during the civil war. According to a presentation to King Charles II, in 1690 after the restoration, Stone had been 'sequestered, plundered and imprisoned' because of his loyalty to the crown.

== Legacy ==
Nicholas Stone died at Long Acre, London, on 24 August 1647, and was buried in the parish church at St Martin-in-the-Fields. The sculpted memorial tablet, to the man who had created so many memorials for others, has been lost; only a print of it remains to indicate his likeness.

Despite being Master Mason to the Crown, and his revolutionary works being for and commemorating the most eminent in the land and being displayed in the country's most prominent buildings, Stone was always thought of as a craftsman, and accorded that status. It was to be his contemporary and less accomplished rival, the French sculptor Hubert Le Sueur, working in bronze, who was to cause the status of a sculptor to be elevated to that of an artist.
