= Elizabeth Cary =

Elizabeth Cary may refer to:

- Elizabeth Cary, Viscountess Falkland, early modern poet and playwright
- Elizabeth Cabot Agassiz (née Cary, 1822–1907), founder of Radcliffe College
- Elisabeth Luther Cary (1867–1936), American writer and art critic
- Elizabeth, Lady Amherst (née Cary, 1717–1797), wife of Jeffery Amherst, 1st Baron Amherst

== See also ==
- Elizabeth Carey (disambiguation)
