= Municipal Borough of Heston and Isleworth =

Former local government district of Middlesex, England

Coordinates: 51.47°N 0.35°W

Heston and Isleworth
- Local Government District (1875–1894); Urban District (1894–1932); Municipal Borough (1932–1965)
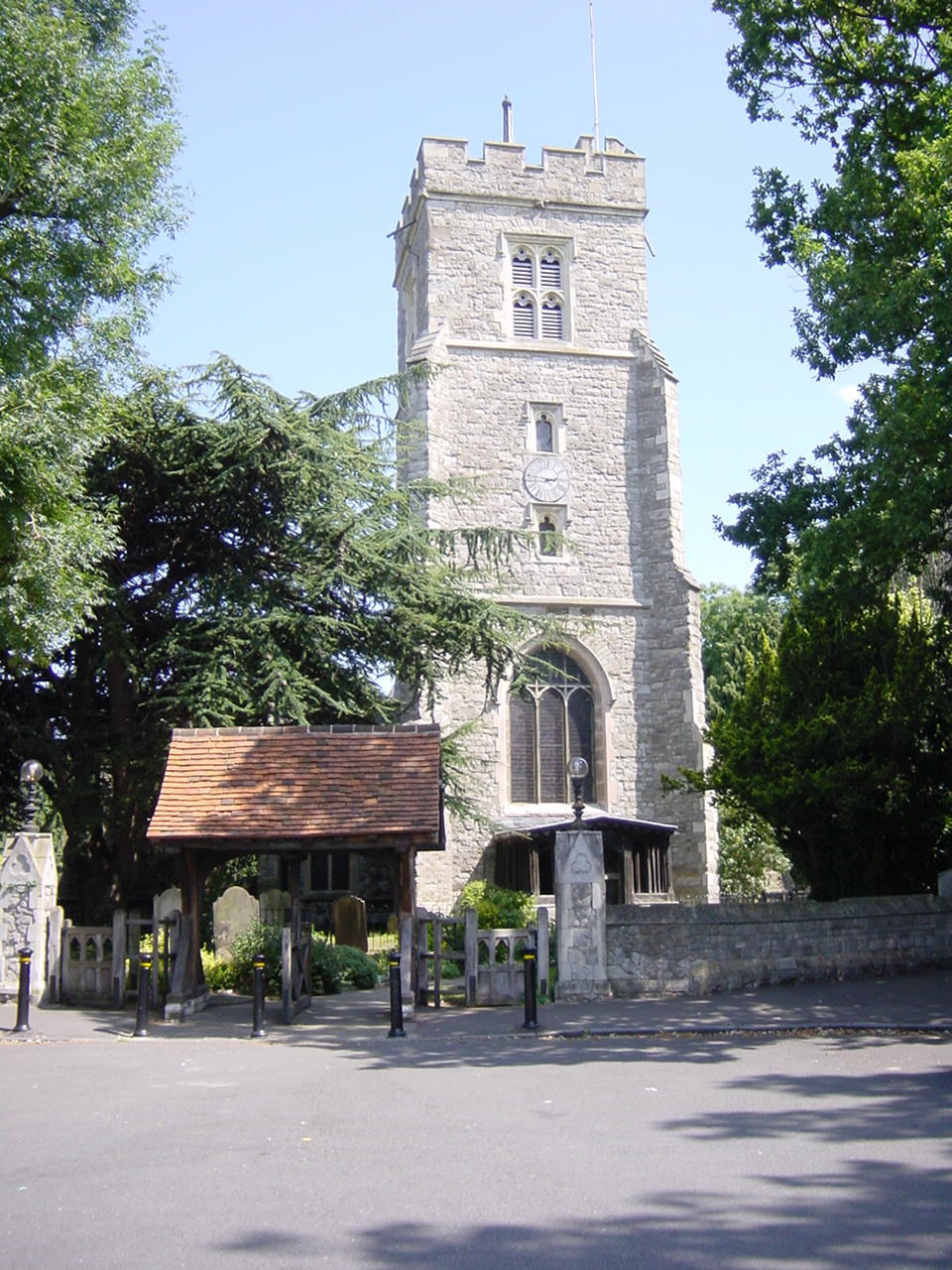

- Heston and Isleworth within Middlesex in 1961
- Area
  - 1894: 9,052 acres (36.63 km^{2})
  - 1971: 7,218 acres (29.21 km^{2})
- History
  - Created: 29 September 1875
  - Abolished: 31 March 1965
  - Succeeded by: London Borough of Hounslow
- Status: Local Government District (1875–1894); Urban district (1894–1932); Municipal borough (1932–1965)
- Government
  - HQ: Treaty Road, Hounslow
  - Motto: Unitate Fortior (Stronger by union)
- Subdivisions
  - Type: Civil parishes
  - Units: Heston; Isleworth

Heston and Isleworth was a local government district of Middlesex, England from 1875 to 1965.

== History ==
Heston and Isleworth were both ancient parishes. The settlement of Hounslow grew up on the boundary between the two parishes, and was made its own ecclesiastical parish in 1835, whilst continuing to straddle Heston and Isleworth for civil purposes. In 1875 a local government district was created covering the whole of the two civil parishes, governed by an elected local board. The district was initially divided into three electoral wards: Heston, Hounslow and Isleworth. In September 1894 an area of about 114 acres (0.178 mi^{2}) north of the Grand Junction Canal was transferred from Heston parish to Norwood parish in the Southall Norwood district.

In December 1894 all such local government districts were converted into urban districts under the Local Government Act 1894. Until 1905 the council met at the Town Hall on High Street in Hounslow, which had been built by a private company in 1858. A new town hall was completed for the council on Treaty Road, Hounslow in 1905.

Until 1927 the urban district contained the two civil parishes of Isleworth and Heston; as urban parishes they did not have parish councils of their own. The two parishes were united into a single parish called Heston and Isleworth in 1927 covering the whole urban district. A referendum of local electors was held later in 1927 on whether to change the urban district's name from Heston and Isleworth to Hounslow. A significant majority of those who voted supported the change of name (6,778 in favour, 3,775 against), but it was vetoed by Middlesex County Council.

Heston and Isleworth was incorporated as a municipal borough in 1932. There were boundary adjustments with several of the borough's neighbours in 1934. Most were relatively modest, with the most significant being that the borough absorbed nearly half of the abolished parish of Cranford, including the village.

== Areas also included within boundaries ==
The area contained several neighbourhoods, some of which were also ecclesiastical parishes. The neighbourhoods included:

- Old Isleworth
- Spring Grove
- Osterley
- Syon Lane
- North Hyde
- Sutton Green
- Hounslow
- Hounslow East
- Hounslow West
- Lampton
- Worton
- Wyke

== Successor ==
In 1965 the municipal borough was abolished and its former area transferred to Greater London to be combined with the Municipal Borough of Brentford and Chiswick to the east and the Feltham Urban District to the south-west to form the London Borough of Hounslow.

== Coat of arms ==
The arms of Heston and Isleworth were granted in 1932. They were: Tierced in pairle Azure, Sable and gules in chief two wings conjoined argent to the dexter a cross bottonée or and to the sinister a lion rampant guardant per fesse of the last and or the fourth. The motto was 'UNITATE FORTIOR' (Latin: Stronger by union). The silver wings on blue referred to Heston Aerodrome. The gold cross bottony came from the seal of the Monastery of St. Saviour and St. Brigit of Syon, founded in 1416 at Twickenham by King Henry V and moved to the site on which Syon House now stands circa 1431. The gold and silver lion came from the arms of Hounslow Priory, founded in the thirteenth century by the Trinitarian Brothers of Redemption, on the site now occupied by Holy Trinity Church. The motto referred to the union of the two formerly separate parishes of Heston and Isleworth.
