= Elizabeth Carey (social activist) =

Canadian home-maker and social activist

Elizabeth Carey (married name Elizabeth Murray (10 November 1835 – 9 August 1920) was a Canadian home-maker and social activist.

She was one of the founders of the Halifax Infants' Home. She was also involved in the Nova Scotia Society for the Prevention of Cruelty (to animals). She was married to Robert Murray.
