= Elizabeth Carey, Lady Berkeley =

English courtier and patron of the arts

Elizabeth Carey
- Lady Berkeley
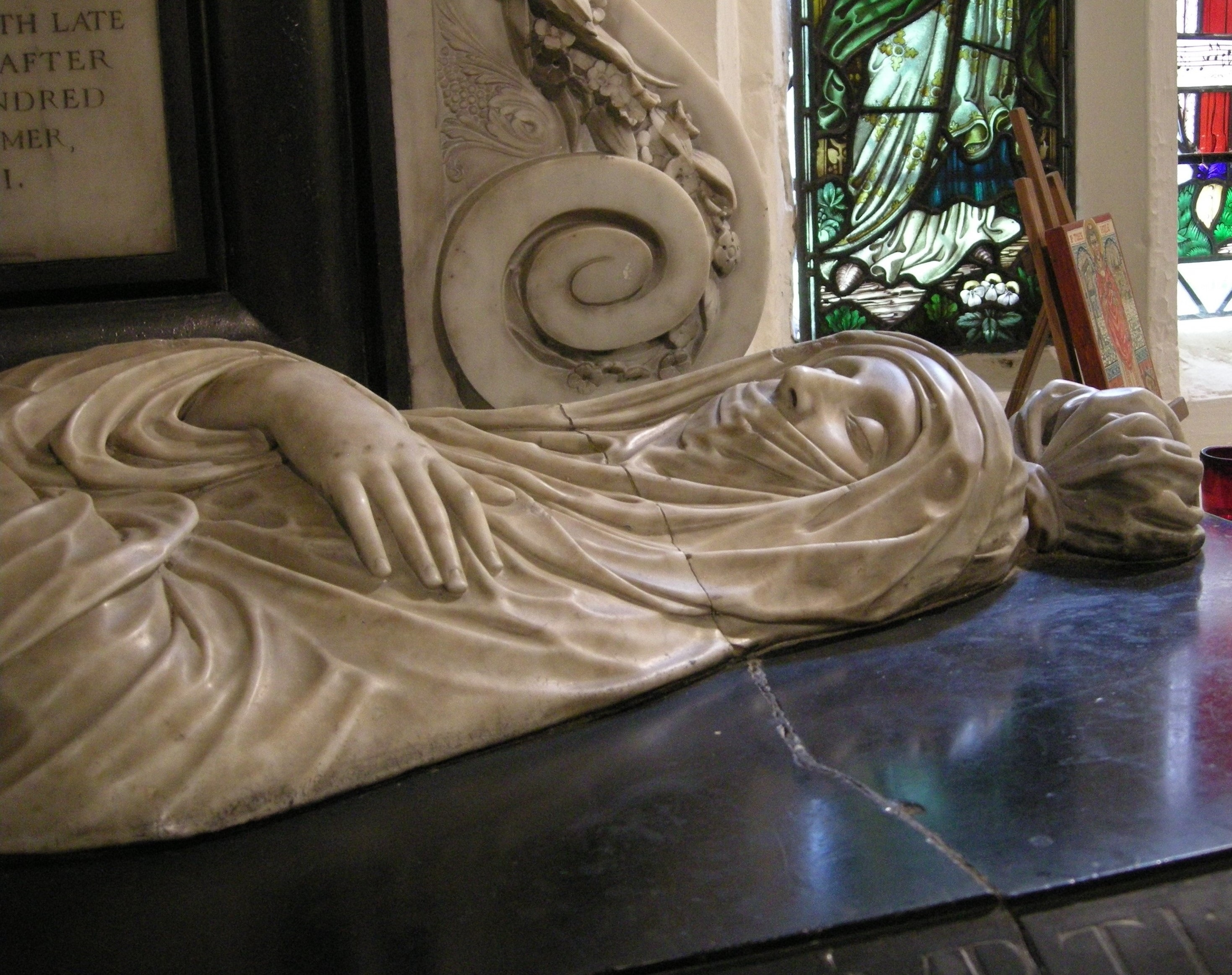
- Elizabeth, Lady Berkeley's tomb effigy by Nicholas Stone, in St Dunstan's church, Cranford, Middlesex
- Born: 24 May 1576
- Died: 23 April 1635 (aged 58)
- Buried: 25 April 1635; Cranford parish church
- Spouses: Thomas Berkeley; Sir Thomas Chamberlain
- Issue: Theophila Berkeley; George Berkeley, 8th Baron Berkeley
- Father: George Carey, 2nd Baron Hunsdon
- Mother: Elizabeth Spencer

Lady Elizabeth Berkeley (née Carey; later Chamberlain; 24 May 1576 – 23 April 1635), was an English courtier and patron of the arts.

== Life ==
Elizabeth Carey was the only child of George Carey, 2nd Baron Hunsdon, and Elizabeth Spencer. Queen Elizabeth I was one of her godmothers. Her childhood was divided between the Hunsdon residence at Blackfriars, London, Carisbrooke Castle on the Isle of Wight, and (from 1593) the manor of West Drayton, Middlesex.

She married Sir Thomas Berkeley on 19 February 1596, probably at Blackfriars, when she was nineteen years old. Her family were patrons of Shakespeare's theatre company, and her wedding has been put forward as one of the possible occasions when A Midsummer Night's Dream was performed for the first time in public. On 5 January 1606, at the wedding festivities of the Earl of Essex and Lady Frances Howard, Elizabeth was one of the female dancers representing the "Powers of Juno" in Ben Jonson's masque Hymenaei: there is an extant portrait of her dressed in her masque costume.

She bore her husband a daughter and a son:

- Theophila Berkeley (1596–1643), who married Sir Robert Coke. Theophila was educated "under the sole direction of her mother", and was later said to be fluent in French, Italian, Latin and Greek. Theophila was a companion of the king's daughter Elizabeth, when she lived at Coombe Abbey, and was a bridesmaid at her wedding to Frederick V of the Palatinate.
- George Berkeley, 8th Baron Berkeley (7 October 1601 – 10 August 1658), who was tutored by Philemon Holland of Coventry. George married Elizabeth Stanhope, the daughter of Sir Michael Stanhope, by whom he had issue.

Elizabeth and her husband circulated between Berkeley residences including New Park, Gloucestershire, Claverdon, Warwickshire (owned by her maternal family), and Caludon Castle, near Coventry (the last being the principal home of her father-in-law, Henry, 7th Baron Berkeley, until his death in 1613). However, Sir Thomas was financially imprudent and ran up enormous debts. In a crisis of 1606–7, Elizabeth took over the management of his affairs (selling her own inheritance at Tonbridge and Hadlow, Kent, to minimise the burden); and in 1609 Sir Thomas signed a contract handing over all responsibility for household management to Elizabeth and the Berkeley family steward, John Smyth of Nibley. When Sir Thomas died (aged 37) in 1611, she paid off the many outstanding debts.

In 1618 she bought the estate of Cranford, Middlesex for the sum of £7,000 from the co-heirs of Sir Richard Aston. She also acquired the manor of Durdans, near Epsom, Surrey, which was settled on her daughter Theophila. In February 1622, she remarried Sir Thomas Chamberlain (or Chamberland), a Justice of the King's Bench. When he died on 17 September 1625, her second husband bequeathed a generous £10,000 to her son from her first marriage.

Elizabeth died on 23 April 1635 and was buried on 25 April in Cranford parish church. Her white marble effigy, depicting her in her shroud, is by Nicholas Stone.

== Learning and patronage ==
Carey's mother was educated and a noted patron of the arts, and passed these traits on to her daughter. Carey was tutored by Henry Stanford. In 1594, aged 18, she is known to have translated two of Petrarch's sonnets from Italian into English. In the same year, Thomas Nashe dedicated The Terrors of the Night to her, praising her "sharpe Wit" and "religious piety". (The previous year, Nashe had dedicated Christ's Teares Over Jerusalem to her mother.) Peter Erondelle's French primer and book of manners, The French Garden (1605), was also dedicated to her, and it has been suggested that she served as the model for the character of "Lady Rimellaine" in the book. In 1610, she was patron of Philemon Holland's translation from the Latin of William Camden's Britannia. She appears to have considered contributing £20, and perhaps £40, towards the volume; and in a commendatory poem Thomas Muriell praised her as the "rare Phoenix cause of this translation". However, shortly before publication, she seems to have become dissatisfied with the quality of Holland's work and withdrew her support: the published book does not mention her patronage, although she is mentioned in the next edition of 1637. She is also listed among the many dedicatees of Camden's Annales (1625).

She donated volumes in Latin, Greek, French, Italian and English to Coventry school and city library. In later life, John Smyth described her living at Cranford, "amongst her thousands of books".

== Ancestry ==
Ancestors of Elizabeth Carey, Lady Berkeley

16. Sir Thomas Carey
8. William Carey
17. Margaret Spencer
4. Henry Carey, 1st Baron Hunsdon
18. Thomas Boleyn, 1st Earl of Wiltshire
9. Mary Boleyn
19. Elizabeth Howard
2. George Carey, 2nd Baron Hunsdon
10. Sir Thomas Morgan
5. Anne Morgan
22. Sir James Whitney
11. Anne Whitney
23. Blanche Milbourne
1. Elizabeth Carey
24. Sir John Spencer
12. Sir William Spencer
25. Isabella Graunt
6. Sir John Spencer
13. Susan Knightley
3. Elizabeth Spencer
28. Robert Kitson
14. Sir Thomas Kitson
7. Katherine Kitson
30. John Donington
15. Margaret Bourchier
31. Elizabeth Pye

== Bibliography ==
- Beilin, Elaine V. (2011) [2004]. "Carey [Carew], Elizabeth, Lady Hunsdon (1552–1618)". Oxford Dictionary of National Biography (online ed.). Oxford University Press. doi:10.1093/ref:odnb/4641. (Subscription, Wikipedia Library access or UK public library membership required.) [on her mother, but includes a paragraph on Lady Berkeley]
- Broadway, Jan (1999). "John Smyth of Nibley: a Jacobean man-of-business and his service to the Berkeley family". Midland History. 24: 79–97. doi:10.1179/mdh.1999.24.1.79.
- Broadway, Jan (2021). The Wives of the Berkeleys: families and marriage in Tudor and Stuart England. Gloucester: Xmera. ISBN 9780956742810.
- Duncan-Jones, Katherine (1999). "Bess Carey's Petrarch: newly discovered Elizabethan sonnets". Review of English Studies. n.s. 50 (199): 304–19. doi:10.1093/res/50.199.304.
- Harris, Oliver D. (2015). "William Camden, Philemon Holland and the 1610 translation of Britannia". Antiquaries Journal. 95: 279–303. doi:10.1017/S0003581515000189. S2CID 163181232.
- Stone, Lawrence (1973). Family and Fortune: Studies in Aristocratic Finance in the Sixteenth and Seventeenth Centuries. Oxford: Clarendon Press. ISBN 019822401X.
