= Kavkazsky (rural locality) =

Kavkazsky (Russian: Кавка́зский; masculine), Kavkazskaya (Кавка́зская; feminine), or Kavkazskoye (Кавка́зское; neuter) is the name of several rural localities in Russia:

- Kavkazsky, Karachay-Cherkess Republic, a settlement in Prikubansky District of the Karachay-Cherkess Republic
- Kavkazsky, Stavropol Krai, a khutor in Sovetsky District of Stavropol Krai
- Kavkazskaya (rural locality), a stanitsa in Kavkazsky District of Krasnodar Krai
- Kavkazskoye, Krasnoyarsk Krai, a selo in Minusinsky District of Krasnoyarsk Krai
- Kavkazskoye, Novosibirsk Oblast, a selo in Bagansky District of Novosibirsk Oblast

== See also ==
- Caucasus (disambiguation)
- Caucasia (disambiguation)
- Caucasian (disambiguation)
