= Ivan Vostorgov =

Saint Ioann Ioannovich Vostorgov
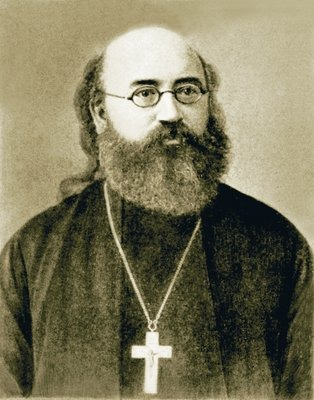

Archpriest, Hieromartyr
- Born: Иоанн Иоаннович Восторгов; 1 February 1864 (20 January Julian); Kavkazskaya, Kavkazsky otdel, Kuban oblast, Russian Empire
- Residence: Moscow
- Died: 5 September 1918 (aged 54); Moscow, Moscow Governorate, Russian Soviet Federative Socialist Republic
- Cause of death: Execution by shooting
- Resting place: Khodynka Field
- Venerated in: Russian Orthodox Church
- Canonized: 16 August 2000, Moscow by Bishops' Council of the Russian Orthodox Church
- Feast: 23 August

Ivan Ivanovich Vostorgov also known as John Vostorgov (Russian: Ива́н (Иоа́нн) Ива́нович Восто́ргов; January 20 [ February 1 ], 1864, Kavkazskaya – September 5, 1918 or August 28, 1918, Moscow) – priest of the Russian Orthodox Church, archpriest. Preacher, church writer, missionary, prominent figure in the monarchist movement, chairman of the Russian Monarchist Party. Vostorgov was executed by the Bolshevik government.

He was glorified among the Holy New Martyrs and Confessors of Russia at the Jubilee Bishops' Council of the Russian Orthodox Church in August 2000 for church-wide veneration; commemorated on August 23 according to the Julian calendar and in the Council of New Martyrs and Confessors of Russia.

== Early life ==
He was born in 1864 in Kuban, in the village of Kavkazskaya, into the family of priest Ioann Aleksandrovich Vostorgov and Tatiana Ksenofontovna Vostorgova. His grandfather, Aleksandr Vostorgov, was a master of theology and professor at the Vladimir Theological Seminary. Vostogrov was orphaned at an early age.

In 1887 he graduated from the Stavropol Theological Seminary at the age of 23 going on to teach at the seminary.

He married Elena Evplovna Vostorgova née Makovkina (died in 1915).

== Early career ==
=== Service in the Stavropol Diocese ===
Vostorgov was appointed the supervisor of the Stavropol Theological School in August 1887 after his graduation. Then being made the teacher of Russian and Church Slavonic languages.

Two years later Vostorgov was made the deacon of the Church of the Archangel Michael - Kirpilskoye, in the Kuban Region. After being made a decon Vostorgov was quickly elevated the rank of priest.

At his own expense, he set up a parochial school in the village, opened a temperance society, and preached extensively. The activities of the young priest led to many local Old Believers into joining the Russian Orthodox Church.

In 1890 Vostorgov became the observe of church parish schools of the 12th deanery district of the Kuban. He also became the religious teacher and rector at the Stavropol boy's gymnasium and associated church. In 1893 he became a member of the council of the Stavropol diocesan women's school and a member of the board of the Stavropol Theological Seminary.

=== Service in Transcaucasia ===
In 1894 Vostorgov became a religious teacher at the gymnasium in the city of Elisavetpol (now Ganja), In 1896 he also simultaneously acted as the secretary of the pedagogical council of the gymnasium.

==== Time in Tiflis ====
In 1897 he took up a role as a religious teacher at the 1st Tiflis Girls' Gymnasium of Grand Duchess Olga Feodorovna and rector of the school's house church in the name of Saint Equal-to-the-Apostles Princess Olga. In 1898 he became a religious teacher at the 1st Tiflis Men's Classical Gymnasium.

In 1900, in the Tiflis area populated by dissidents, three parochial schools were opened with his active participation, in which up to three hundred people studied. Soon the number of schools increased to eight. In addition, he participated in the establishment of a department of the Society of Zealots of Russian Historical Education in the city in memory of Emperor Alexander III. In december of 1900 he became the diocesan's observer of parochial schools and literacy schools. Over the next three years, under his leadership, the number of schools in the diocese doubled. The number of students reached five hundred in a few months, 20% of whom were children of sectarians.

== Archpriesthood ==
=== Acension to Archpriesthood ===
On January 6, 1901 he was elevated to the rank of archpriest in the Russian Orthodox Church, near simultaneously, he became the editor of the journal "Spiritual Herald of the Georgian Exarchate". One of Vostorgov's first major actions as an Archpriest was on a business trip to the city of Urmia (in Persia), engaged in reviewing the affairs of the Russian Orthodox Spiritual Mission and revising the schools located at the mission. During this period, the Persian Assyrians, who professed Nestorianism, converted to Orthodoxy against the historical culture of the region.

=== Moscow priest and missionary ===
In August 1905, he was sent by the Chief Prosecutor of the Holy Synod on a trip to familiarize himself with the needs of theological educational institutions of the Irkutsk, Transbaikal and Primorsk dioceses.

Then in early 1906 a missionary preacher with the rights of an anti-sectarian diocesan missionary, in connection with which Vostorgov moved to Moscow. During his service in the Moscow diocese, he would become one of the closest associates of Metropolitan Vladimir. Later that year he visited the Samara and Simbirsk dioceses, becoming acquainted with the state of church schools there as well.

Vostorgov was one of the organizers of the 4th Missionary Congress, held in Kiev in July 1908, where he was elected chairman of the department for organizing measures to combat socialism, atheism and anti-church literature. He gave a report on the topic: "The preaching of socialism and its success among student youth and, mainly, among workers." He is the author of a large number of works devoted to the criticism of socialist and communist teachings. According to him, "since socialism denies God, the soul, immortality, spiritual freedom in man, constant rules of morality, then it must turn to the only means of influencing man - violence."

In 1908 he traveled to the Far East, where he preached among peasant settlers. He was the initiator of the creation and, from January 1909, the deputy chairman of the Brotherhood of the Resurrection of Christ, created to organize the spiritual care of Russian settlers (it was chaired by Metropolitan Vladimir). During the first year of its existence, the Brotherhood created 25 preaching and 3 missionary circles to train priests to work with settlers. In 1909-1910, he organized pastoral and missionary courses in Moscow to train priests and teachers for parishes and schools created in the settler areas. In 1912, pastoral and missionary courses were organized in Khabarovsk and Tobolsk, and in 1913 for Irkutsk and Tashkent.

Vostorgov was made an Honorary member of the Kazan Theological Academy in 1909. From September 9, 1909, Vostorgov also served as rector of the Prince Vladimir Church at the Moscow diocesan house.

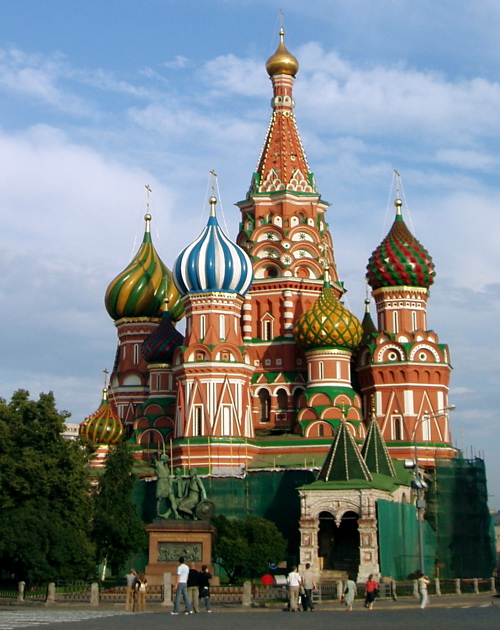
The Cathedral of the Intercession (St. Basil's Cathedral) that Vostorgov served as the rector of

In 1909, he traveled to eight resettlement dioceses to determine the procedure for opening new parishes and schools in them, building churches and school buildings. In addition, he inspected the Beijing Spiritual Mission and Orthodox churches in Northern Manchuria, and became familiar with the state of missionary work in Japan and Korea. In 1910, he traveled around Turkestan from the Persian border to the northern limits of the Syr Darya region, and visited the Semirechye and Semipalatinsk regions. In July and August of the same year, he participated in the work of the All-Siberian Missionary Congress, which was held in Irkutsk.

From 1910 Vostorgov served as the head of the Higher Theological Women's Courses in Moscow, which in 1913 was transformed into the Women's Missionary Institute. From 1911 he was the head of the psalm-reading courses in Moscow for the preparation of psalm-readers in the diocese of Siberia and the Far East.

From 1913 Vostorgov served as rector of the Cathedral of the Intercession on the Moat (St. Basil's Cathedral). He was elected chairman of the Moscow capital council of deans. Vostorgov became one of the most famous Orthodox preachers of his time. John of Kronstadt highly valued his work, saying "that he is a wonderful man, possessing extraordinary eloquence, that he is Chrysostom, that he can bring great benefit to Russia."

== Anti-Bolshevik Activism ==
=== Leader of the monarchist movement ===
At the same time, he became involved in political activities, becoming one of the most prominent figures in the monarchist movement. He joined the Russian Monarchist Party (RMP), and became a member of the Moscow department of the Union of the Russian People (SRN; until 1908). He published the newspapers Tserkovnost (Church), Russkaya Zemlya (Russian Land), and the magazine Vernost (Loyalty). He participated in the Second and Third All-Russian Congresses of Russian People.

From 1907, he was the chairman of the Russian Monarchist Party, later renamed the Russian Monarchist Union, and headed the Russian Monarchist Assembly.

During the conflict in the Russian Black Hundred movement between the head of the Union of the Russian People Alexander Dubrovin and the leader of the Russian People's Union named after Michael the Archangel (RNSMA) Vladimir Purishkevich, he supported the latter. In connection with this, in 1908 he became a member of the Main Chamber of the RNSMA, and in 1909 he was expelled from the SRN.

In 1909, he was one of the initiators of the Fifth All-Russian Congress of Russian People in Moscow, which was also attended by Metropolitan Vladimir, Archimandrite Makarii (Gnevushev), Archpriest Epiphanius Kuznetsov (the future Bishop Ephraim of Selenginsk), Hieromonk Nestor (Anisimov), Vladimir Purishkevich and a number of other church and secular monarchist figures. The honorary chairman of the congress was Bishop Seraphim (Chichagov). This event was supposed to help unite all right-wing political forces, but only solidified the split in their ranks - the SRN ignored the congress.

In 1913, when the Synod prohibited clergy from engaging in political activity, he left his leadership position in the Russian Monarchist Union, and in 1915, the Main Chamber of the RNSMA.

The political activities of Ivan Vostorgov were harshly criticized by the liberal public, as well as by some Black Hundred activists, who accused him, in particular, of criminal offenses, such as the murder of his wife (who was still alive at the time; she died in 1915). The accusations were later not confirmed, but they became one of the reasons why Father John was not consecrated as a bishop in 1916 (another reason could have been his rejection of Grigory Rasputin). Vostorgov was accused by right-wing political competitors of poisoning the political activist Pavel Krushevan and embezzling funds from monarchist organizations. The conservative publicist Nikolai Durnovo was especially active in the right-wing press in speaking out against Ivan Vostorgov with accusations of various crimes.

Alexandra Bogdanovich, the wife of the right-wing monarchist activist Yevgeny Bogdanovich, wrote in her diary (referring to the right-wing political activist Boris Nikolsky ) regarding the investigation into the murder of State Duma deputies Grigory Iollos and Mikhail Herzenstein: "...they will raise the case of Iollos' murder, but who killed him? Archpriest Vostorgov prepared the killers for him; Iollos was killed, like Gertsenstein, with Stolypin's money ".

=== Activities after the February Revolution ===
After the fall of the monarchy, without the blessing of Metropolitan Macarius of Moscow, he convened the Moscow Metropolitan Council of Deans under his chairmanship on March 7 ( March 20 ), 1917 to adopt a resolution:

- 1) Unanimously and wholeheartedly, in the name of pastoral and patriotic duty, submit to the Provisional Government and the subsequent orders of the Supreme Church Authority in this direction.
- 2) Welcome with all joy the statement of the Chief Prosecutor of the Holy Synod Vladimir Nikolaevich Lvov about the new direction of church life, in the sense of complete non-interference of the Church and its ministers, as such, in their church-pastoral activities, in the political system of the country. <...>
- 8) This resolution, in view of the temporary absence of the Metropolitan in Moscow, is to be carried out without the approval of the Metropolitan and communicated to all the Most Reverend Vicars, the Spiritual Consistory, and all the clergy of Moscow <...>".

He considered it necessary to personally appear in print with an explanation of his political position, writing, in particular: "Why was everything suppressed in diocesan life in the old system? Because both the bishops and the Synod were in slavery". In 1917 he was made secretary of the Missionary Council of the Holy Synod, and then a Participant of the All-Russian Local Council from 1917 to 1918.

=== Arrest and execution ===
After the Bolsheviks came to power, he sharply criticized their activities in his sermons and called on the Orthodox to immediately unite into "flock squads" to protect the church. Vostorgov viewed the communist government as an exetensial threat to the Russian church and theology as a whole, further worsening his political standing within the new government.

On May 30, 1918, he was arrested in his apartment together with Bishop Efrem (Kuznetsov) of Selenginsk, an old acquaintance of his who was unable to return to his Irkutsk diocese with the onset of political turmoil in Russia; he was accused of having agreed to the sale of the diocesan house, which had by that time already been nationalized by the new government. On June 8, 1918, an article entitled "The Commercial Deal of Patriarch Tikhon, Archpriest Vostorgov and Co." was published in the Izvestia newspaper. He was held in the internal prison of the Cheka, then in Butyrka prison. Archpriest Medvedev was also arrested in this case. They were accused of having ties to the House of Romanov.

After the murder of Moisei Uritsky and the assassination attempt on Lenin, the Bolshevik government declared the Red Terror. Extrajudicial executions of hostages began throughout Soviet Russia; Archpriest Ivan Vostorgov was among the first victims: on September 4, 1918, the Investigative Commission of the Revolutionary Tribunal under the All-Russian Central Executive Committee decided to liquidate Vostorgov's case extrajudicially. He was publicly executed on September 5, 1918, in Petrovsky Park along with Bishop Ephraim, as well as former Chairman of the State Council Ivan Shcheglovitov, former Ministers of Internal Affairs Nikolai Maklakov and Alexei Khvostov, and Senator Stepan Beletsky. After the execution, the bodies of all those executed (up to 80 people) were robbed.

According to one eyewitness,

"...at the request of Father Ivan, the executioners allowed all the condemned to pray and say goodbye to each other. Everyone knelt down, and the fervent prayer of the "death row inmates" flowed, after which everyone approached for the blessing of Bishop Ephraim and Father Ivan, and then everyone said goodbye to each other. The first to cheerfully approach the grave was Archpriest Vostorgov, who had said a few words to the others before, inviting everyone to bring the last atoning sacrifice with faith in God's mercy and the imminent revival of the Motherland. "I am ready," he concluded, turning to the escort. Everyone stood in the designated places. The executioner came up to him from behind, took his left hand, twisted it behind his back and, putting a revolver to the back of his head, fired, simultaneously pushing Father Ivan into the grave."

== Awards ==
- Order of St. Anne, 2nd degree (1905)
- Order of St. Vladimir, 3rd class (1909)
- Order of St. Anne, 1st degree (1912)
- Order of St. Vladimir, 2nd class (1916)

== In culture ==
Hieromartyr Ivan Vostorgov became one of the main characters in Natalia Irtenina's historical novel "Crimson Robes" (Moscow, 2021), dedicated to the theme of new martyrs and confessors of the Russian Church of the 20th century.

Appears in Valentin Pikul's novel "Evil Force". [ru]

In the Soviet feature film "Agony" (1974), the role of Ioann Vostorgov was played by amateur actor Vyacheslav Vasiliev, and in the film "Black Triangle" (1981), by actor Stepan Krylov.
