= Kavkazsky =

Kavkazsky (masculine), Kavkazskaya (feminine), or Kavkazskoye (neuter) may refer to:

- Kavkazsky District, a district of Krasnodar Krai, Russia
- Kavkazsky (rural locality) (Kavkazskaya, Kavkazskoye), several rural localities in Russia
- Kavkazskaya railway station, a railway station which serves the town of Kropotkin in Krasnodar Krai, Russia
- Caucasian State Nature Biosphere Reserve (Kavkazsky zapovednik), a nature reserve in southern Russia

== See also ==
- Caucasus (disambiguation)
- Caucasia (disambiguation)
- Caucasian (disambiguation)
