= Kropotkinskoye Urban Settlement =

Kropotkinskoye Urban Settlement is the name of several municipal formations in Russia.

- Kropotkinskoye Urban Settlement, a municipal formation which the work settlement of Kropotkin and the settlement of Svetly in Bodaybinsky District of Irkutsk Oblast are incorporated as
- Kropotkinskoye Urban Settlement, a municipal formation within Kavkazsky Municipal District which the Town of Kropotkin in Krasnodar Krai is incorporated as

== See also ==
- Kropotkinsky
