= North Caucasus (disambiguation) =

North Caucasus or North Caucasian may refer to:

== Current entities ==
- North Caucasus, the part of Russia north of the watershed divide formed by the spine of the Caucasus Mountains
- North Caucasian languages
- North Caucasian Federal District, created in 2010
- North Caucasus Railway, a broad gauge Russian railway network that links the Sea of Azov (in the west) and Caspian Sea
- North-Caucasus Federal University, with campuses in Stavropol and Pyatigorsk

== Historical entities ==
- Mountainous Republic of the Northern Caucasus (1917–22)
- North Caucasian Soviet Republic (July–December 1918)
- North Caucasus Military District (1918–2010)
- North Caucasus Krai (1924–37)
- Southern Federal District created in 2000 as North Caucasian Federal District and soon renamed; the current North Caucasian Federal District was part of the Southern Federal District until 2010.

== See also ==
- Caucasus (disambiguation)
- Caucasian (disambiguation)
