= Kropotkinsky =

Kropotkinsky (masculine), Kropotkinskaya (feminine), or Kropotkinskoye (neuter) may refer to:

- Kropotkinsky District, name of Kavkazsky District of Krasnodar Krai, Russia in 1924–1944
- Kropotkinskoye Urban Settlement, several municipal urban settlements in Russia
- Kropotkinskaya, a station of the Moscow Metro, Moscow, Russia
