= Caucasus (disambiguation) =

The Caucasus or Caucasia is a geographic region in Eurasia.

Caucasus may also refer to:

== Places ==
- North Caucasus, also Ciscaucasus or Ciscaucasia
- South Caucasus, also Transcaucasus or Transcaucasia
- Western Caucasus, a western region of the Caucasus in Southern Russia

=== Subdivisions of the Russian Empire ===
- Caucasus Viceroyalty (1785–1796)
- Caucasus Oblast (1785–1790), became a part of Caucasus Governorate (1802–1822)
- Caucasus Viceroyalty (1801–1917)
- Caucasus Military District (1865–1917)

=== Mountains ===
- Caucasus Mountains, a mountain range in the region
- Greater Caucasus, the major mountain range of the Caucasus Mountains
- Lesser Caucasus, second of the two main mountain ranges of Caucasus mountains

== Other ==
- Caucasus (Fabergé egg), a jewelled enameled Easter egg
- Caucasus (horse) (1972 – c. 1991), thoroughbred racehorse
- Caucasus Cable System, a Georgian-owned submarine communications cable
- Caucasus Campaign (1735)
- Caucasus Greeks
- Caucasus: Nanatsuki no Nie, a 2009 visual novel from Innocent Grey
- Kamen Rider Caucasus, the main antagonist of the Japanese tokusatsu movie, Kamen Rider Kabuto: God Speed Love
- Apostolic Administration of the Caucasus, diocese-level district of the Latin Rite of the Catholic Church
- "Caucasus" ("Kavkaz"), codename of a series of Russian military exercises
- The Caucasus (poem), an 1845 poem by Taras Shevchenko

== See also ==
- Caucasia (disambiguation)
- Caucasian (disambiguation)
- Kavkazsky (disambiguation)
- North Caucasus (disambiguation)
