= Caucasian peoples =

Caucasian peoples may refer to:

- Ethnic groups in the Caucasus, various ethnic groups inhabiting the Caucasus region
- Peoples speaking the languages restricted to the Caucasus area: Kartvelian (South Caucasian), Northwest Caucasian, and Northeast Caucasian
- Caucasian race, an obsolete racial classification of humans
- White people, a racialized classification

== See also ==
- Caucasian (disambiguation)
