= Caucasus: Nanatsuki no Nie =

2009 video game

- Developer(s): Innocent Grey
- Publisher(s): Innocent Grey
- Artist(s): Miki Sugina
- Writer(s): Miya Suzuka
- Composer(s): Little Wing
- Platform(s): Microsoft Windows
- Release: December 11, 2009
- Genre(s): Eroge, visual novel
- Mode(s): Single-player

Caucasus: Nanatsuki no Nie (クロウカシス 七憑キノ贄, Kuroukashisu Nanatsuki no Nie) is a Japanese adult visual novel developed by Innocent Grey. It was released on December 11, 2009 for Microsoft Windows.

== Plot ==
Caucasus takes place in a small village named Nanatsuki Village (七月村, Nanatsuki Mura) located in a remote, mountainous region. An old estate by the name of Nanatsu Mansion (七憑館, Nanatsu Kan) is located there with a history of many strange and unexplained events having occurred there. These events are commonly referred to as being the "Curse of Nanatsuki" (七憑きの呪い, Nanatsuki no Noroi).

The story of Caucasus begins on a path to the Nanatsuki Village where a blizzard has stricken the two main characters. A young woman from the Nanatsuki Mansion comes to their aid and provides them with shelter from the blizzard at the mansion. On that same day, a wedding was being held at the Nanatsuki Mansion. Meanwhile, the snowstorm continued to rage outside and in increasing severity.

The next day, the headless body of the groom was found which quickly sparked a dispute over the matter of assets and inheritance and whether this was another event caused by the "Curse of Nanatsuki". The rope bridge outside was cut, cutting off the route to the outside world. Four men and seven women remain at the Nanatsuki Mansion.

== Internet radio show ==
An Internet radio show for promoting Caucasus, and the first Internet radio broadcast for Innocent Grey, aired its first broadcast on July 9, 2009. The show, produced by Rock'n' Banana, is hosted by Sanma Aji, who voices Venio Nanatsuki, and Doshizuku Hira, who voices Akane Hiyama, and is streamed online on every second and fourth Thursday of the month.

== Development ==
Caucasus is the sixth project developed by Innocent Grey and was announced in 2009 June issue of Tech Gian. Like their previous works, the concept art for Caucasus is being done by Miki Sugina.

The voice acting applications closed on May 12, 2009, and auditions concluded on May 25. Recording for the character voices began on June 12.

== Music ==
The theme song to Caucasus, entitled "Snowdrop", was performed by Haruka Shimotsuki. The soundtrack of Caucasus was composed by Little Wing. Samples of the theme song and some background music tracks were provided with the 2009 September issue of Tech Gian. The soundtrack for the game was released on the same date as the game, on December 11, 2009.
