= Caucasian =

Caucasian may refer to:

== Common meanings ==
- Anything from the Caucasus region or related to it
  - Ethnic groups in the Caucasus
  - Caucasian Exarchate (1917–1920), an ecclesiastical exarchate of the Russian Orthodox Church in the Caucasus region
  - Caucasus hunter-gatherer, an anatomically modern human genetic lineage identified in 2015

== Languages ==
- Languages of the Caucasus
- Northwest Caucasian languages
- Northeast Caucasian languages
- South Caucasian languages
- Dené–Caucasian languages

== Animals ==
- Caucasian Brown, a cattle breed
- Caucasian honey bee, a sub-species of the western honey bee
- North Caucasian pig, a pig breed
- Caucasian snowcock, a type of bird
- Caucasian Shepherd Dog, a dog breed

== Other uses ==
- The Caucasian (newspaper), newspaper published between 1889 and 1913
- Caucasian, a nickname for a white Russian (cocktail)
- Caucasian race, an obsolete racial classification of humans
- White people, a racialized classification

== See also ==
- Caucasophobia, racism in Russia toward native Caucasus inhabitants
- Caucasia (disambiguation)
- Caucasian peoples (disambiguation)
- Caucasus (disambiguation)
- Kavkazsky (disambiguation)
- List of dishes from the Caucasus
