= Russian Monarchist Union =

Political party of the Russian Empire

Russian Monarchist Union Russian: Русский монархический союз
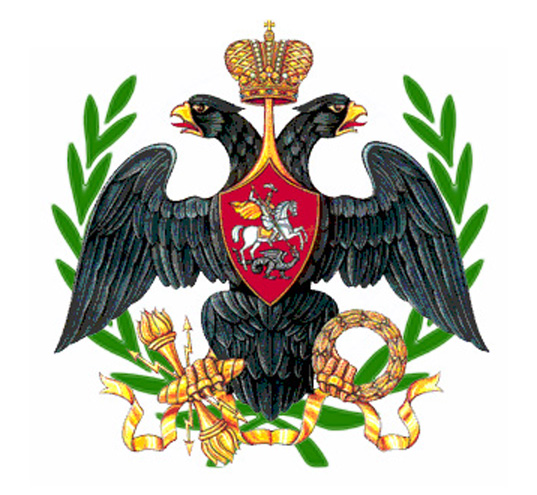
- Abbreviation: RMU (РМС)
- Founder: Vladimir Gringmut
- Founded: May 8, 1905; 120 years ago
- Dissolved: October 1917; 108 years ago
- Headquarters: Moscow, Russian Empire
- Newspaper: "The Russian Monarchist" (Русский Монархист)
- Membership: 10,000
- Ideology: Restoration of the Russian monarchy; Black-Hundredist; Russian conservatism; Russian irredentism; Antisemitism
- Political position: Far-right
- Religion: Russian Orthodox Church
- Colours: Black Gold White
- Slogan: "God is With Us!" (Съ нами Богъ!)

Party flag

Russian Monarchist Union (Russian: Русский монархический союз, romanized: Russkii Monarkhicheskii Soiuz) was a Russian monarchist right-wing nationalist organisation, founded in February 1905 in Moscow. Until 1907, it was known as the Russian Monarchist Party (Russian: Русская монархическая партия, romanized: Russkaia Monarkhicheskaia Partiia).

The party was founded by Vladimir Gringmut (ru), reactionary editor of the periodical Moscow News (Moskovskiye vedomosti), in February.

It advocated the reestablishment of a powerful autocratic rule, martial law, and suppression of Jews, who they claimed were mainly the instigators of the revolutionary disorders. It also stood for local self-government, public education, freedom of the press, and improving workers' and peasants' conditions. It had the following internal enemies: constitutional democrats, socialists, revolutionaries, anarchists, and the aforementioned Bundists.

== Bibliography ==
- Figes, Orlando (2014). A People's Tragedy: The Russian Revolution 1891–1924. London: The Bodley Head. ISBN 9781847922915.
