= Caucasian Brown =

Breed of cattle

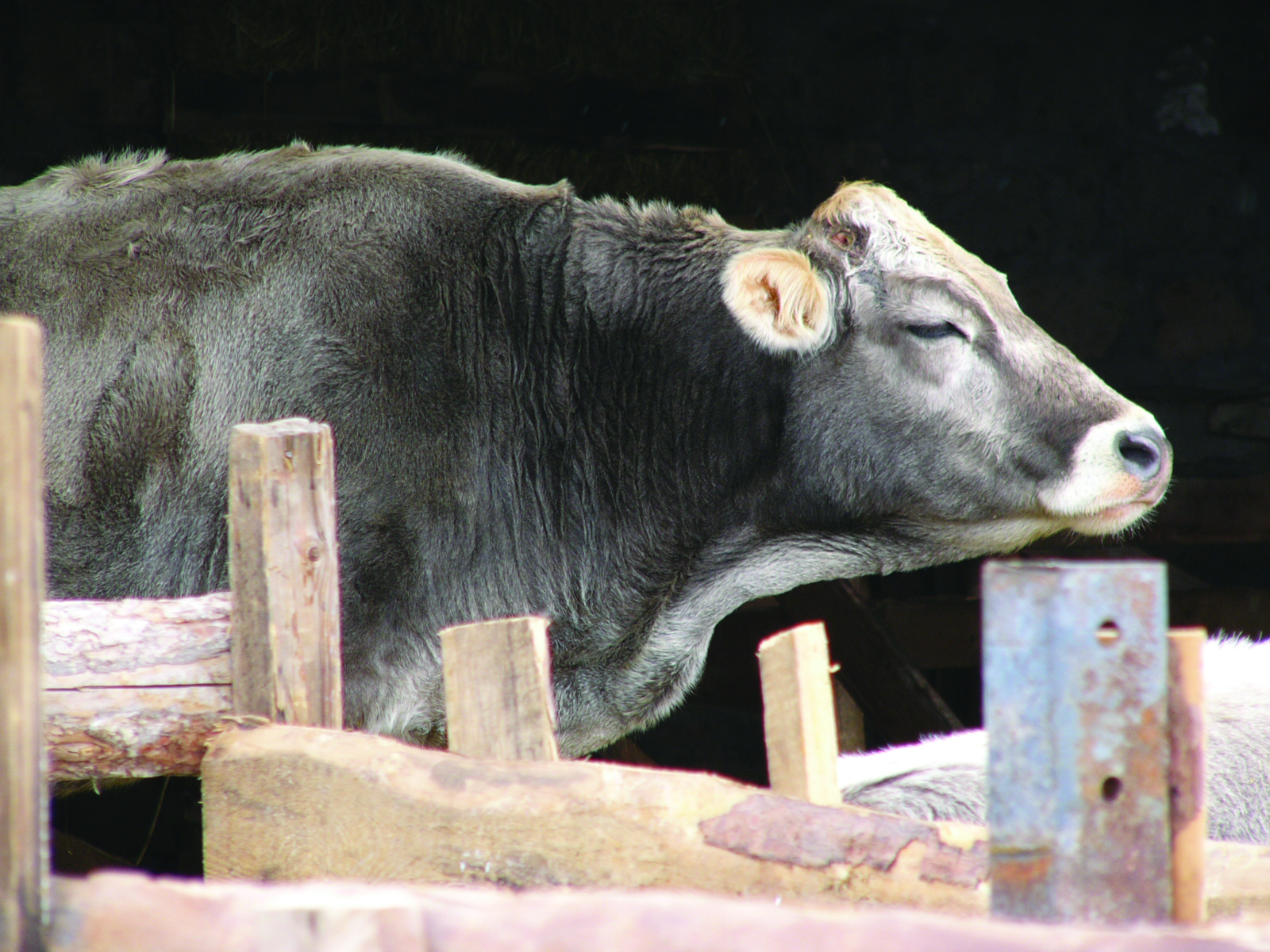
Brown Caucasian cow bred in Armenia

The Brown Caucasian is a cattle breed from the Caucasus (Armenia, Georgia, Azerbaijan and Dagestan (Russia)). Found in the Caucasus region the breed is the result of crossing Brown Swiss and Kostroma cattle onto the local cattle to produce a variable breed depending on the local stock, with strains for dairy and dairy-beef production.
