= Caucasia (disambiguation) =

The Caucasia or Caucasus is a geographic region in Eurasia.

Caucasia may also refer to:

- Caucasia, Antioquia, a municipality in Colombia
- Caucasia (novel), a 1998 book by Danzy Senna
- Caucasia (film), a 2007 Azerbaijani film directed by Farid Gumbatov

== See also ==
- Caucasus (disambiguation)
- Caucasian (disambiguation)
- Kavkazsky (disambiguation)
