= Government of Vladimir Lenin =

Soviet government led by Vladimir Lenin and his administration

Lenin Government
- 12th Cabinet of Russia (as Russian SFSR)

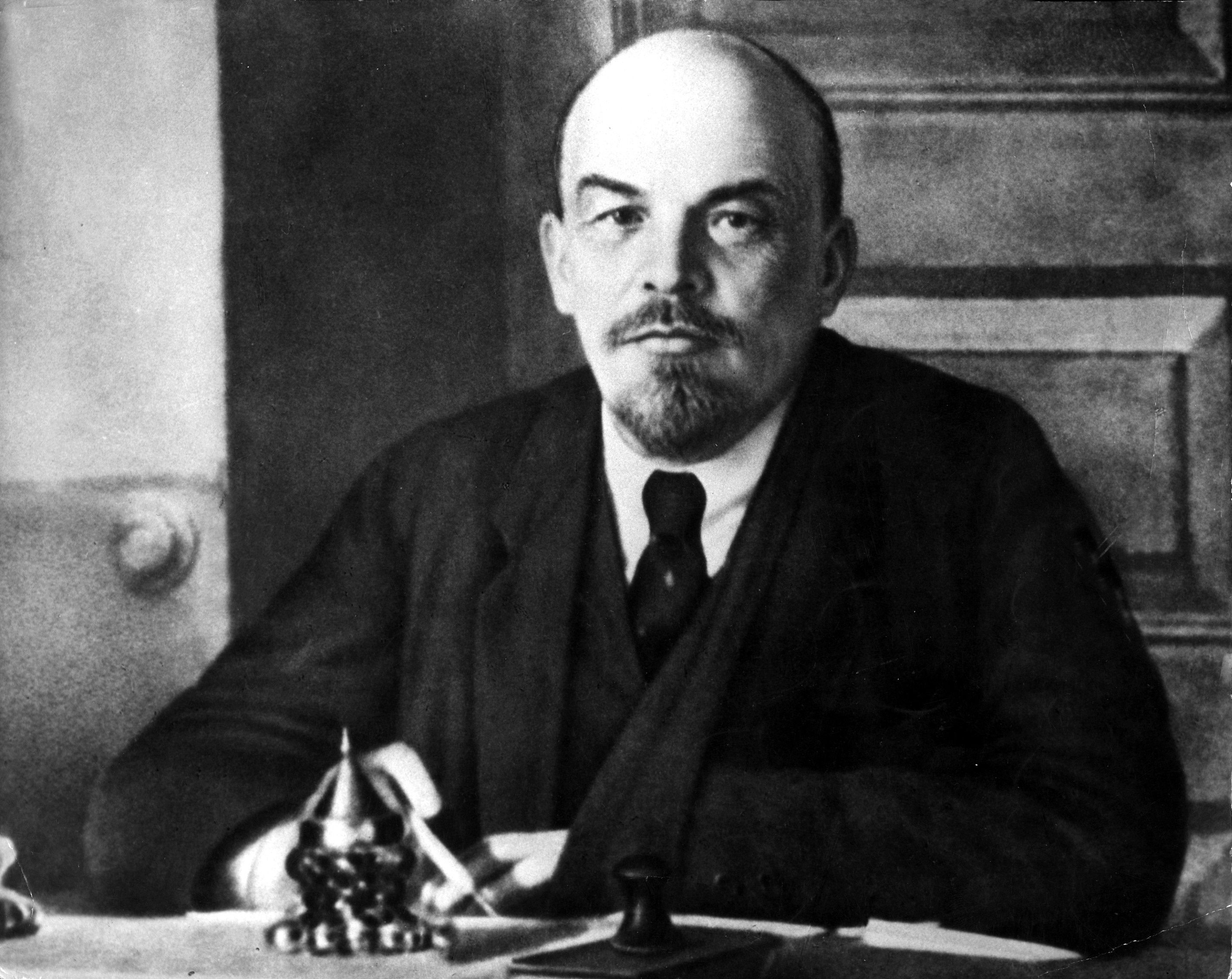
- Date formed: 8 November 1917
- Date dissolved: 21 January 1924

People and organisations
- Head of government: Vladimir Lenin
- Member parties: Bolsheviks; Left Socialist-Revolutionaries (1917–1918)
- Status in legislature: Majority (1917–1921); Sole legal party (from 1921)
- Opposition cabinet: Komuch (1918); Ufa Directory (1918); Omsk Government (1918–1920); Priamurye Government (1920–1923)
- Opposition parties: Socialist-Revolutionaries (1917–1921); Mensheviks (1917–1921); Left Socialist-Revolutionaries (1918–1921)

History
- Incoming formation: Alexander Kerensky's Second Cabinet
- Outgoing formation: Alexei Rykov's Cabinet
- Predecessor: Alexander Kerensky
- Successor: Alexei Rykov

Under the leadership of Lenin, the Bolshevik Party seized power in the Russian Republic with the Communist coup d'état known as the October Revolution. Overthrowing the Russian Provisional Government, the Bolsheviks established a new government, the first Council of People's Commissars, with Lenin as chairman. Ruling by decree, Lenin’s Sovnarkom introduced widespread reforms, such as confiscating land for redistribution among the peasantry, permitting non-Russian nations to declare themselves independent, improving labour rights, and increasing access to education.

The Lenin party continued with the previously scheduled November 1917 election, but when it produced a Constituent Assembly dominated by the rival Socialist Revolutionary Party the Bolsheviks lambasted it as counter-revolutionary and shut it down. The Bolshevik government banned a number of centrist and right-wing parties, and restricted the activities of rival socialist groups, but entered into a governmental coalition with the Left Socialist Revolutionary Party. Lenin had inherited a country in the midst of the First World War, with war-weary Russian troops battling the Central Powers of Germany and Austria-Hungary on the Eastern Front. Deeming the ongoing conflict a threat to his own government, Lenin sought to withdraw Russia from the war, using his Decree on Peace to establish an armistice, after which negotiations took place resulting in the Treaty of Brest-Litovsk. This punitive treaty – highly unpopular within Russia – established a cessation of hostilities but granted considerable territorial concessions to Germany, who took control of large areas of the former Empire.

== Consolidating power: 1917–1918 ==
=== Constitutional and governmental organization ===
The previous Provisional Government had agreed for a Constituent Assembly to be elected in November 1917; after taking power, Lenin – aware that the Bolsheviks were unlikely to attain a majority – wanted to postpone this election, but other Bolsheviks disagreed, and thus the election took place as scheduled. In the election for the Constituent Assembly, the Socialist Revolutionaries were elected as the largest party, with the Bolsheviks coming second with approximately a quarter of the vote. According to Lenin biographer David Shub, this had been "the freest election in [Russia's] history" up till that time. During the vote, the Bolsheviks had achieved their best result in the cities, industrial areas, and military garrisons in the centre of Russia, while their anti-war message had proved particularly popular with soldiers and sailors. Lenin and other supporters felt that the vote had not been a fair reflection of the Russian people's democratic will, believing that the population had not had the time to acquaint themselves with the Bolsheviks' political program and noting that the candidacy lists had been drawn up before the Left Socialist-Revolutionaries had split from the Socialist-Revolutionaries.

The newly elected Russian Constituent Assembly convened in Petrograd in January 1918. However, the Bolsheviks publicly argued that the Constituent Assembly was counter-revolutionary because it sought to remove power from the soviets, an idea that the Mensheviks and Socialist-Revolutionaries argued against. When campaigners marched in support of the Constituent Assembly in Petrograd they were fired upon by soldiers, resulting in several deaths. Intent on discrediting the Assembly, the Bolsheviks presented it with a motion that would have stripped the Assembly of much of its legal powers; the Assembly members rejected this. The Bolshevik government claimed this as evidence that the Assembly was counter-revolutionary and disbanded it by force.

There were repeated calls for the Bolsheviks to welcome socialists from other parties to join Sovnarkom, however Lenin resolutely opposed this idea; in November 1917 a number of members from the Bolshevik Central Committee resigned in protest. Moreover, Russia's largest trade union, the Union of Railroad Employees, threatened to go on strike unless a pan-socialist coalition government was formed. However, the Bolsheviks did court the support of the Left Socialist-Revolutionaries, a group who had splintered from the main Socialist-Revolutionary Party and who were more sympathetic to the Bolshevik administration; on 9 December 1917 the Left Socialist-Revolutionaries became junior partners in a coalition with the Bolsheviks, being given five posts in the Sovnarkon cabinet. This resulted in what Lenin biographer Dmitri Volkogonov termed "a rare moment of socialist pluralism" in Soviet history.

In November 1917 Lenin and his wife took a two-room flat within the Smolny Institute, with Trotsky and his family living in the flat opposite; being based here allowed Lenin to devote himself to the revolutionary government. The stress of this position exacerbated Lenin's health problems, in particular his headaches and insomnia. In December, he and Nadezdha left Petrograd for a holiday at the tuberculosis sanatorium at Halila in Finland – now officially an independent nation-state – although returned to the city after a few days. In January 1918 he survived an assassination attempt made on him in the city; Fritz Platten, who was with Lenin at the time, shielded him but was injured by a bullet. Sources differ regarding who was to blame, with some identifying the culprits as disaffected Social-Revolutionaries, and others as monarchists.

In the spring of 1918, Sovnarkom officially divided Russia into six oblasti, or territorial entities – Moscow, the Urals, North, Northwest, West Siberia, and Central Siberia – each with their own quasi-sovereign status. These oblasti were governed by socialist intelligentsia, and held their own Congresses of Soviets. In part this division served to facilitate the central control of the various regional soviets, many of which had taken over de facto control of their own areas. The oblasti in turn were divided into smaller provinces, the gubernii, a number of which proclaimed themselves to be "republics", and some of the non-Russian peoples living within Russian territory, such as the Bashkirs and Volga Tatars, formed their own "national republics".

At the 7th Congress of the Bolsheviks in March 1918, the group renounced their official name, the "Russian Social Democratic Labor Party", with Lenin believing that the term "Social Democratic" was too closely associated with the Social Democratic Party of Germany, who had endorsed Germany’s entrance into the war. Instead they renamed themselves the Russian Communist Party, emphasizing their ultimate goal: the establishment of a future communist society. Although ultimate power officially wrested with the country's government in the form of Sovnarkom and the Executive Committee elected by the All-Russian Congress of Soviets, the Communist Party was the de facto controlling power in Russia, something which was acknowledged by its members at the time. Within the party was established a Political Bureau ("Politburo") and Organisation Bureau ("Orgburo") to accompany the preexisting Central Committee. The decisions made by these three party bodies were considered mandatory for the state apparatus of the Sovnarkom and Council of Labor and Defense to adopt.

Lenin was the most significant figure in this governance structure; as well as being the Chairman of Sovnarkom and sitting on the Council of Labor and Defense, he was on the Central Committee and Politburo of the Communist Party. The only individual to have anywhere near this influence was Lenin's right-hand man, Yakov Sverdlov, although the latter died in March 1919 during a flu pandemic. However, in the Russian public imagination it would be Leon Trotsky who was usually seen as the second-in-command; although Lenin and Trotsky had had differences in the past, after 1918 Lenin came to admire Trotsky's skills as an organizer and his ruthlessness in dealing with the Bolsheviks' enemies. Within this Bolshevik inner circle, it was Zinoviev and Kamenev who were personally closest to Lenin.

During this period, the party itself had witnessed massive growth; while it had 23,600 members in February 1917, this had grown to 250,000 by 1919, and it would again rise to 730,000 in March 1921. Lenin recognised that many of these new members were careerists seeking to advance their own positions rather than those who shared the Bolsheviks' ideological vision; in June 1921 he ordered a re-registration process of members in order to weed out perceived unreliable elements. In July 1918, at the Fifth All-Russian Congress of the Soviets, a constitution was approved that reformed the Russian Republic into the Russian Soviet Federative Socialist Republic.

=== Social and economic reform ===
"To All Workers, Soldiers and Peasants. The Soviet authority will at once propose a democratic peace to all nations and an immediate armistice on all fronts. It will safeguard the transfer without compensation of all land – landlord, imperial, and monastery – to the peasants' committees; it will defend the soldiers' rights, introducing a complete democratisation of the army; it will establish workers' control over industry; it will ensure the convocation of the Constituent Assembly on the date set; it will supply the cities with bread and the villages with articles of first necessity; and it will secure to all nationalities inhabiting Russia the right of self-determination... Long live the revolution!"

— Lenin's political program, October 1918

Lenin's new regime issued a series of decrees, the first of which was a Decree on Land; drawing heavily upon the Socialist-Revolutionary Party's platform, it declared that the landed estates owned by the aristocracy and the Russian Orthodox Church should be confiscated, taken into national ownership, and then redistributed among the peasants by the local government. This was accompanied by the Decree on Peace, in which the Bolsheviks called for an end to the First World War. These two decrees exacerbated the problem of desertion from the Russian Army, as increasing numbers of soldiers left the Eastern Front and returned to their homes, where they intended to claim land. In November the Bolshevik government issued the Decree on the Press which closed down many opposition media outlets which were deemed counter-revolutionary; the decree was widely criticised, including by many Bolsheviks themselves, for compromising freedom of the press, although Sovnarkom claimed that it would only be a temporary measure. On 1 December, Sovnarkom outlawed the Constitutional Democratic Party.

On 29 October, Lenin released a Decree restricting the work day to eight hours. That same day he proclaimed the Decree on Popular Education which stipulated that the Bolshevik government would guarantee free, secular, universal education for all children in Russia. On 2 November, Lenin issued the Declaration of the Rights of the Peoples of Russia, which stated that non-Russian ethnic groups living inside the Empire had the right to cede from Russian authority and establish their own independent nation-states. Many nations declared independence as a result of this: Finland and Lithuania in December 1917, Latvia and Ukraine in January 1918, Estonia in February 1918, Transcaucasia in April 1918, and Poland in November 1918. Independent communist parties were established in each of these countries with the support of Sovnarkom, which held a Conference of Communist Organisations of the Occupied Territories in Moscow 1918. The government officially converted Russia from the Julian calendar to the Gregorian calendar used in Europe. Over the coming years, laws were introduced that helped to emancipate women, by giving them economic autonomy of husbands and removing restrictions on divorce.

On 30 November they issued an order requisitioning the country's gold, and nationalised the banks, an act which Lenin saw as a major step toward establishing socialism. That same month witnessed a major overhaul of the Russian armed forces, as Sovnarkom implemented egalitarian measures by abolishing all previous ranks, titles, and medals; to reorganise the system, soldiers were called upon to establish their own committees through which they could elect their own commanders. On 14 November, Lenin issued the Decree on Workers' Control, which called on the workers of a particular enterprise to establish an elected committee who would monitor that enterprise's management. On 1 December, Sovnarkom established a Supreme Council of the National Economy (VSNKh) which had authority over industry, banking, agriculture, and trade. The factory committees were organised as being subordinate to the trade unions, who in turn were subordinate to the VSNKh; the state's centralized economic was therefore prioritised over local economic interests. In February 1918 Lenin signed the Basic Law on the Socialisation of the Land, a measure that ratified the transfer of agricultural land to Russia's peasants. In November 1918 he decreed the establishment of state orphanages.

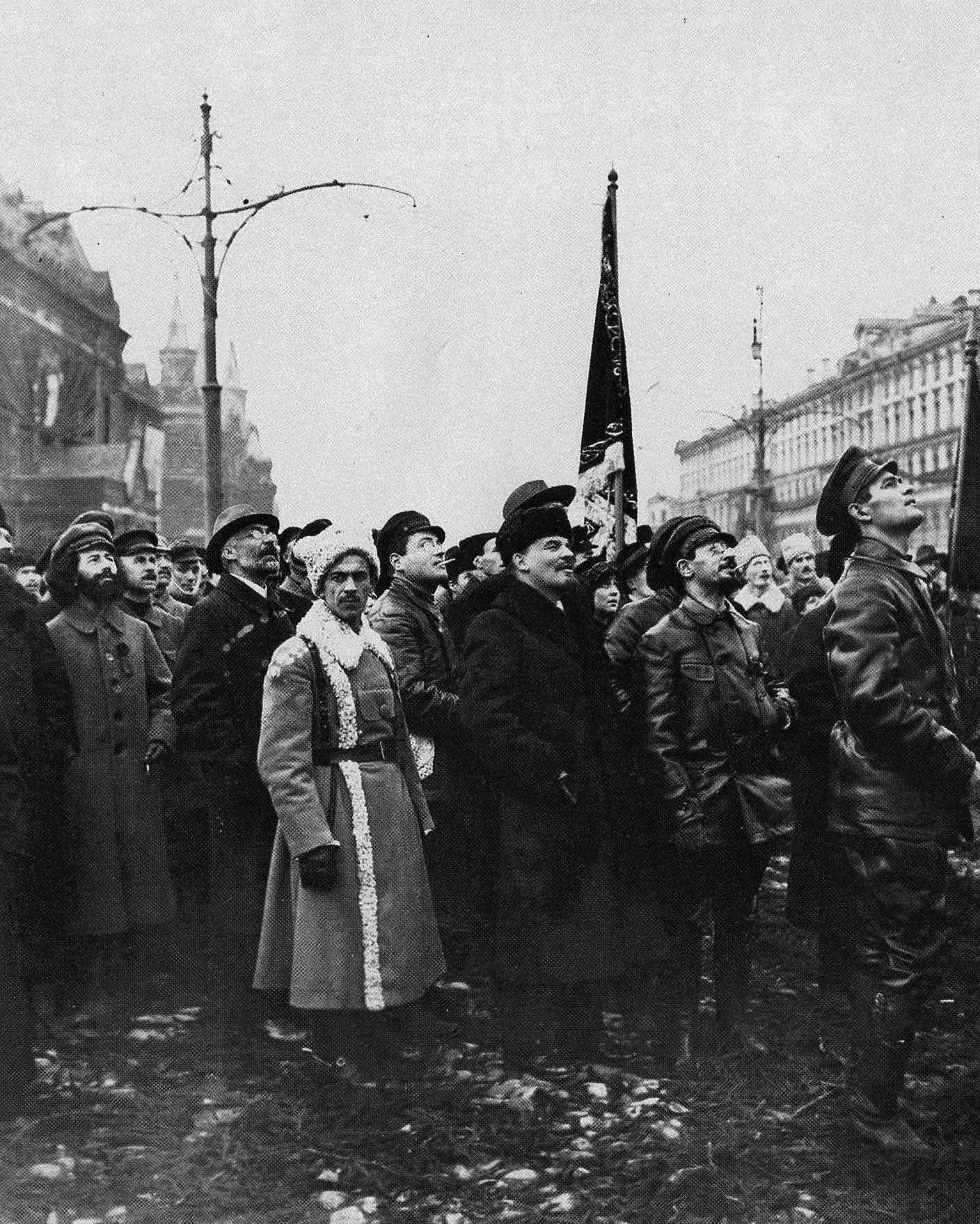
Smidovich, Lenin and Sverdlov looking over Marx and Engels monument, 1918

In early 1918, Sovnarkom cancelled all foreign debts and refused to pay the interest owed on them. In April 1918, it nationalised foreign trade, establishing a state monopoly on imports and exports. In June 1918 Sovnarkom issued a decree "On Nationalisation", released to combat German investors buying too many shares in heavy industry; this decree officially nationalised public utilities, railways, engineering, textiles, metallurgy, and mining, although often these were state owned in name only. Full-scale nationalisation would not take place until November 1920, when small-scale industrial enterprises were brought under state control. There was, however, division within the Bolsheviks; those who came to be known as the "Left Communists" desired the total nationalisation of all industry, agriculture, trade, finance, transport, and communication. Conversely, Lenin believed that this was impractical at that stage, arguing that the government should only nationalise Russia's large-scale capitalist enterprises, such as the banks, railways, larger landed estates, and larger factories and mines. He called for a process of state capitalism, allowing smaller businesses to operate privately until a point where they had grown to a sufficiently large size where they could be successfully nationalised. Lenin also disagreed with the Workers Opposition on issues of economic organisation; in June 1918, Lenin expressed the need for a centralised economic control of industry, whereas the Workers Opposition promoted the idea of each factory being under the direct control of its workers, an approach that Lenin considered to be anarcho-syndicalist rather than Marxism.

Lenin also took an interest in cultural matters, and in November 1917 he drafted a memorandum declaring that Petrograd's libraries should extend their opening hours. In May 1918 he produced a plan for the establishment of a Socialist Academy of Social Sciences, which would also have a publishing arm to produce Marxist studies. In August 1918, he instructed Russia's universities to increase the number of students whom they enrolled, instructing them to favour the children of workers and poorer peasants. He supported the closing down of the Bolshoi Theatre, arguing that the money used to keep it open could be better spent on campaigns to combat illiteracy. In April 1918, he called for the removal of Tsarist-era busts and monuments across the country and their replacement with socialist alternatives. To celebrate a year since the October Revolution, in November 1918 Lenin was present for the unveiling of a statue of Karl Marx and Friedrich Engels in Moscow's Red Square, which was followed by a parade of workers and soldiers.

In November 1917, Sovnarkom issued a decree abolishing the pre-existing legal system and its courts. The established system of law was replaced by "revolutionary conscience", which was to be the deciding factor regarding crime and punishment. In November, Revolutionary Tribunals were established to deal with counter-revolutionary crimes, while in March 1918 the People's Courts were established to deal with civil and other criminal offences; told to ignore pre-Bolshevik laws, they were instructed to instead base their rulings on the Sovnarkom decrees and a "socialist sense of justice".

From July 1922, intellectuals deemed to be in opposition to the Bolshevik government were exiled to inhospitable regions or deported from Russia altogether. Lenin personally scrutinized the lists of those to be dealt with in this manner, who included engineers, archaeologists, publishers, agronomists, physicians, and writers. Maxim Gorky wrote to his old friend Lenin out of concern for the treatment of such intellectuals, receiving an angry response condemning the "bourgeois intellectuals" as a counter-revolutionary element in society.

At the time, many of the cities in western Russia were facing famine as a result of chronic food shortages. Lenin claimed that the blame for this problem lay with the kulaks, or wealthier peasants, who were hoarding their produce for their own uses. In May 1918 he issued a requisitioning order that established armed detachments who would confiscate grain from the kulaks for distribution in the cities, and in June called upon the formation of the Committees of Poor Peasants to aid the requisitioning effort. In April 1918 he issued the declaration of "Merciless war against these kulaks! Death to them!". With a booming black market supplementing the official state-sanctioned economy, he also called on speculators, black marketeers and looters to be shot. To ensure compliance, he issued the decree that "in every grain-growing district, 25-30 rich hostages should be taken who will answer with their lives for the collection and loading of all surpluses." A prominent example of Lenin's views on the matter was provided in the August 1918 telegram that he sent to the Bolsheviks of Penza, in which he called upon them to suppress a peasant insurrection by publicly hanging at least 100 "known kulaks, rich men, [and] bloodsuckers". This policy resulted in vast social disorder and violence, with the armed detachments clashing with peasant groups, providing much fuel for the developing civil war, with Lenin biographer Louis Fischer describing it as a "civil-war-within-the-civil-war". The requisitioning efforts disincentived peasants from producing more grain than they could personally consume, and thus production slumped. The policy caused controversy; at the Fifth All-Russian Congress of Soviets, held in Moscow in July 1918, the SRs and Left SRs condemned the use of these armed detachments to procure grain. Realising that the Committees of Poor Peasants had turned upon the 'Middle Peasants' who were not kulaks and that they had contributed to the peasantry's increased alienation from the government, in December 1918 Lenin declared their abolition. He also called upon those workers who lacked discipline to be punished accordingly.

"[The bourgeoisie] practised terror against the workers, soldiers and peasants in the interests of a small group of landowners and bankers, whereas the Soviet regime applies decisive measures against landowners, plunderers and their accomplices in the interests of the workers, soldiers and peasants."

— Lenin on terror.

Privately influenced by Niccolò Machiavelli's writings on the application of state force to ensure control, Lenin repeatedly emphasised the need for terror and violence to be used in order for the old order to be overthrown and for the revolution to succeed, describing such violence as "revolutionary justice". Speaking to the All-Russian Central Executive Committee of the Soviets in November 1917, he declared that "The state is an institution built up for the sake of exercising violence. Previously, this violence was exercised by a handful of moneybags over the entire people; now we want... to organise violence in the interests of the people." When suggestions were made that the government should abolish capital punishment, he strongly opposed the idea, declaring "Never! How can you safeguard a revolution without executions?" Fearing counter-revolutionary forces that would overthrow the revolutionary administration, Lenin ordered the establishment of the Emergency Commission for Combating Counter-Revolution and Sabotage, or Cheka, a political police force which he placed under the leadership of Felix Dzerzhinsky. Lenin claimed that "a good Communist is also a Chekist". Over the coming years, tens of thousands would be killed by the Cheka. By 1918, a series of labor camps were established to deal with perceived enemies of the state, and in April 1921 the government approved the building of a camp that could hold 10,000 to 20,000 prisoners in Ukhta. As a result, the realities of early Bolshevik Russia conflicted with the ideals of a socialist society without oppression, terror or police rule which had been promulgated by Lenin as late as 1917.

Internationally, many socialist observers decried Lenin's regime and stated that what he was establishing could not be categorised as socialism; in particular, they highlighted the lack of widespread political participation, popular consultation, and industrial democracy, all traits that they believed to be intrinsic to a socialist society. In autumn 1918, the Czech-Austrian Marxist Karl Kautsky authored a pamphlet, "The Dictatorship of the Proletariat", in which he criticised what he saw as the anti-democratic nature of the Bolshevik regime, with Lenin publishing a vociferous reply in which he labeled Kautsky a "sycophant of the bourgeoisie". The German Marxist Rosa Luxemburg echoed Kautsky's views, declaring that Lenin had established "not the dictatorship of the proletariat... but only the dictatorship of a handful of politicians". The Russian anarchist Peter Kropotkin described the Bolshevik seizure of power as "the burial of the Russian Revolution".

=== The Treaty of Brest-Litovsk ===
"[By prolonging the war] we unusually strengthen German imperialism, and the peace will have to be concluded anyway, but then the peace will be worse because it will be concluded by someone other than ourselves. No doubt the peace which we are now being forced to conclude is an indecent peace, but if war commences our government will be swept away and the peace will be concluded by another government."

— Lenin on peace with the Central Powers.

Upon taking power in Russia, Lenin believed that a key policy of his government must be to withdraw from the ongoing First World War by establishing an armistice with the Central Powers of Germany and Austria-Hungary. He believed that ongoing war would generate increasing resentment among war-weary Russian troops – to whom he had promised peace – and that both these troops and the advancing German Army posed a threat both to the future of his own government and to the wider cause of international socialism. He therefore was inclined to accept peace with the Central Powers at any cost. Other Bolsheviks – in particular Bukharin and the Left Communists – viewed things differently, believing that peace with the Central Powers would be a betrayal of international socialism and that Russia should instead wage "a war of revolutionary defense" that they believed would provoke an uprising of the German proletariat against their nation's government. Lenin biographer Robert Service would characterise the communist's attempts to win over his fellows on this issue as "the fiercest struggle of his career".

Recognising that he had to proceed with caution, Lenin did not enter into immediate negotiations with the Central Powers, but rather drafted his Decree on Peace, in which he proposed a three-month armistice; it was then approved by the Second Congress of Soviets and presented to the German and Austro-Hungarian governments. The Germans responded positively, viewing this as an opportunity to focus their attentions on the Western Front and stave off looming defeat. In November, armistice talks began at Brest-Litovsk, the headquarters of the German high command on the Eastern Front, with the Russian delegation being led by Adolph Joffe and Leon Trotsky. The two sides agreed on an eleven-day ceasefire, after which they renewed it, agreeing on a ceasefire until January.

The negotiations for a lasting peace produced differences; the German proposal insisted that they be permitted to keep control of their wartime conquests, which included Poland, Lithuania, and Courland, whereas the Russians countered that this was a violation of these nations' rights to self-determination and that a peaceful settlement must be established without any territorial annexations. There had been hopes among the Bolsheviks that the armistice negotiations could be dragged out indefinitely until such a time as proletarian revolution would break out throughout Europe. On 7 January 1918, Trotsky returned from Brest Litovsk to St. Petersburg, informing the government that the Central Powers had presented them with an ultimatum: either they accept Germany's territorial demands or the war would resume.

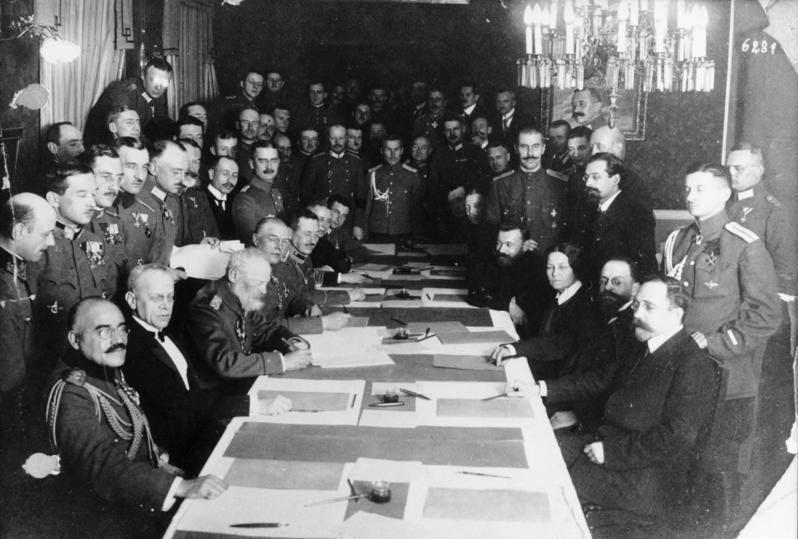
The signing of the treaty

On 8 January, Lenin spoke to the Third All-Russian Congress of Soviets, urging delegates to accept Germany's proposals – he argued that the territorial losses were acceptable if it ensured the survival of the Bolshevik-led government – however the majority of Bolsheviks rejected his position, hoping that they could continue to prolong the armistice. Growing impatient, on 10 February the Central Powers issued a second ultimatum, and while Lenin again urged acceptance, the Bolshevik Central Committee retained its original position, hoping to call Germany's bluff. On 18 February the German Army subsequently relaunched the offensive, advancing further into Russian-controlled territory and within a day conquering Dvinsk; they were now situated 400 miles from the Russian capital of Petrograd.

Lenin again urged the Bolshevik Central Committee to accept the demands of the Central Powers, this time he won a small majority of seven votes to five; Bukharin and the Left Communists continued to express their opposition. On 23 February the Central Powers issued a new ultimatum: the Russian government would recognise German control not only of Poland and the Baltic states but also Ukraine, else they would face a full-scale invasion of Russia itself. On 3 March, the Treaty of Brest Litovsk was signed. Recognising that it would be controversial, Lenin avoided signing the treaty in person, instead sending Grigori Sokolnikov in his place. The Treaty resulted in massive territorial losses for Russia, with 26% of the former Empire's population, 37% of its agricultural harvest area, 28% of its industry, 26% of is railway tracks, and two-thirds of its coal and iron reserves being assigned over to German control. Accordingly, the Treaty was deeply unpopular within Russia, from individuals from across the political spectrum. The Moscow Regional Bureau of the Bolshevik Party officially declared their opposition to the treaty, with Lenin recognising that adopting such a position was "the legal right of members of the party, and this is fully understandable". Several Bolsheviks and Left Social-Revolutionaries resigned from Sovnarkom in protest, but all subsequently returned to their posts on an unofficial basis.

After the Treaty was signed, Lenin's Sovnarkom focused its attentions on attempting to foment proletarian revolution in Germany, issuing an array of anti-war and anti-government publications in the country, many of which were distributed to German troops fighting at the front. Angered, the German government expelled Russia's representatives from its country. However, that month Wilhelm II, the German Emperor, resigned and the country's new administration signed the Armistice of 11 November 1918. As a result, the Sovnarkom proclaimed the Treaty of Brest-Litovsk to be devoid of meaning.

=== Moscow and assassination attempts ===
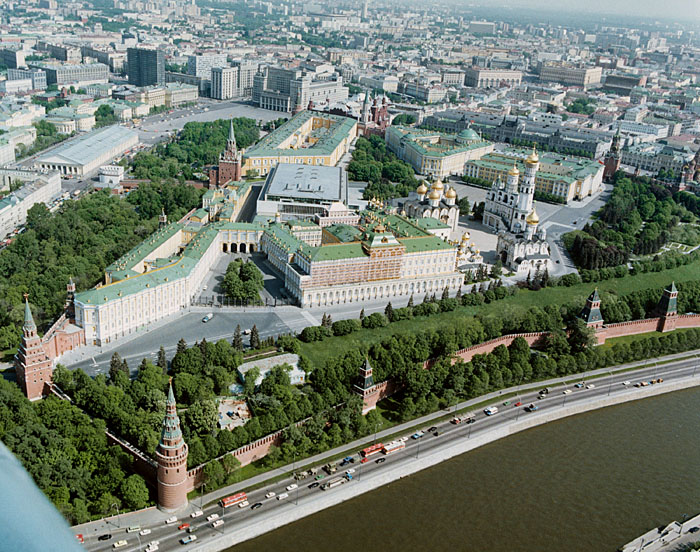
The Moscow Kremlin, which Lenin moved into in 1918

Concerned that the German Army might nevertheless pose a continuing threat, in March 1918 Sovnarkom reluctantly relocated from Petrograd to Moscow, which at the time they believed would be a temporary measure. On 10 March, the government members travelled to Moscow by night train, with most of them settling in the city's Hotel National on Okhotny Road, 300 yards from the Moscow Kremlin; here, Lenin shared a small two-room apartment with his wife and sister Maria. Soon after, Lenin, Trotsky and other Bolshevik leaders moved into the Cavalry Corpus of the Great Kremlin Palace, a temporary measure until the Kremlin's Senate Building was readied for them to move in. Here, Lenin again lived with his sister and wife, in a first floor apartment that was adjacent to the room in which the Sovnarkom meetings were held. Based here, he adopted a pet cat, who both he and his wife doted on; he was known to carry the cat into Sovnarkom meetings. Although Lenin was impressed by the architecture of the Kremlin, he had always disliked Moscow, a traditional Russian city which differed from the Europeanised style of Petrograd. He nevertheless would rarely leave central Moscow for the rest of his life, the only exceptions being trips back to Petrograd in 1919 and 1920 and his periods of recuperation.

In August 1918, after a speech to workers at the Moscow Corn Exchange, Lenin was shot and badly injured. Two bullets had pierced his body, and he was rushed to the Kremlin, where he was seen by doctors. An SR supporter named Fanny Kaplan was arrested, and after confessing to the shooting – and claiming that Lenin was a threat to socialism – she was executed. The attack received much coverage in the Russian press, with much good wishes expressed toward Lenin himself. The assassination attempt boosted Lenin's popularity and generated much sympathy for him. As a respite, in September 1918 Lenin was driven to the luxurious estate near Gorki that the government had recently acquired.

In January 1919, Lenin left Moscow to attend a children's party to which he had been invited in Sokolniki. As he was driving through the suburbs, armed men stopped Lenin's car and ordered its occupants to get out; the thieves then drove off with the car. Lenin insisted that the incident had been a robbery, noting that if it had been politically motivated then the assailants would have killed him. In responding to the incident, Moscow was placed under de facto martial law and several hundred suspected criminals were arrested. In April 1919, at the command of senior Bolshevik Joseph Stalin, the arrangements for Lenin's personal security were increased.

== Consolidating revolution ==
=== Civil war ===
Bolshevik control, February 1918 Bolshevik control, Summer of 1918 Maximum advance of the anti-Bolshevik armies European theatre of the Russian Civil War

Although he had read Carl von Clausewitz's On War, Lenin was inexperienced in military matters. His views on civil war were based squarely on a Marxist understanding of class war, and he was particularly influenced by the example of the Paris Commune. Although expecting there to be opposition from Russia's aristocracy and bourgeoisie, he believed that the sheer numerical superiority of the lower classes, coupled with the Bolsheviks' ability to effectively organise them, guaranteed a swift victory in any conflict. As such, he failed to anticipate the intensity of the violent opposition to Bolshevik rule in Russia. Russia's Civil War pitted the pro-Bolshevik Reds against the anti-Bolshevik Whites, but also encompassed ethnic conflicts on Russia's borderlands and conflict between both Red and White armies and local peasant groups throughout the former Empire.

The country's bourgeoisie, stripped of many of its rights, soon turned to resistance. In South Russia, a Volunteer Army was established by the anti-Bolshevik generals Lavr Kornilov and Mikhail Alekseyev in December 1917. This army subsequently came under the control of Anton Denikin, who led it in an advance through the Don region and into southern Ukraine, later taking control of Kursk and Orel. In Siberia, the anti-Bolshevik general Alexander Kolchak proclaimed himself "Supreme Ruler of Russia", and led an army that pushed toward Moscow, seizing Perm in December 1918; they were ultimately thwarted and forced back into Siberia in July 1919. Kolchak would be captured by the Irtutsk Soviet and executed. These anti-Bolshevik armies carried out the White Terror, a system of oppression against perceived Bolsheviks and groups assumed to support them.

Western governments backed the White forces, feeling that the Treaty of Brest Litovsk was a betrayal to the Allied war effort and angry about the Bolsheviks' calls for world revolution. In December 1917, the British government began financing the White Don Cossack army of Alexey Kaledin, however they were defeated in February 1918. This Western support soon took a more active role in the conflict; by July 1918, 4000 troops provided by the United Kingdom, France, United States, Canada, Italy, and Serbia had landed in Murmansk, taking control of Kandalaksha; by August their troop numbers had grown to 10,000. In November 1918, British, US, and Japanese forces landed in Vladivostok, the latter soon having 70,000 troops based in Siberia. Japan saw this as an opportunity for territorial expansion, desiring to bring Russia's Far Eastern Maritime Province under its own imperial control. While Japanese troops remained to play a part in the civil war, Western troops were soon ordered home, although Western governments continued to provide White armies with officers, technicians, and armaments.

During the civil war, the scarcity and rationing of goods gave impetus to a growth in centralised economic control, in doing so largely eliminating private trade and providing the state with an economic monopoly.

The Whites were bolstered when 35,000 prisoners of war – former members of the Czech Legion – who had been captured by the Russian Imperial Army, turned against the Soviet government while they were being transported from Siberia to North America as part of an agreement with the Allies. They established an alliance with the Committee of Members of the Constituent Assembly (Komuch), an anti-Bolshevik government that had been established in Samara. Komuch and the Czech legion advanced on Kazan but were defeated by the Red Army at the Battle of Sviyazhk.

Responding to these threats to the Sovnarkom, Lenin tasked the senior Bolshevik Leon Trotsky with establishing a Workers' and Peasants' Red Army. With Lenin's support, in September 1918 Trotsky organised a Revolutionary Military Council, remaining its chairman until 1925. Recognising that they often had valuable military experience, Lenin agreed that officers who had previously been loyal to the Tsar could serve in the Red Army, although Trotsky established military councils to monitor the activities of such individuals.

The Red Army were sent into the newly independent national republics on Russia's borders to aid Marxists there in establishing soviet systems of government. This resulted in the establishment of the Commune of the Working People of Estonia, the Latvian Socialist Soviet Republic, the Lithuanian Soviet Socialist Republic, the Socialist Soviet Republic of Byelorussia, and the Ukrainian Soviet Republic, all of which were officially independent of the Russian Soviet Federated Socialist Republic. Many senior Bolsheviks disliked Sovnarkom's encouragement of such nationalisms, viewing it as a violation of socialism's internationalist ethos. Lenin insisted to them that national and ethnic sensibilities needed to be respected, but reassured these Bolsheviks that the ultimate power wrested with Moscow and that these national governments were de facto regional branches of central government.

After the Brest Litovsk Treaty, the Left SRs had increasingly come to view the Bolsheviks as traitors to the revolutionary cause. In July 1918, a member of the Left SR, Yakov Grigorevich Blumkin, assassinated the German ambassador to Russia, Wilhelm von Mirbach, hoping that the ensuing diplomatic incident would lead to a relaunched revolutionary war against Germany. Seeking to defuse the situation, Lenin issued his personal condolences to the German Embassy. The Left SR launched a coup in Moscow, shelling the Kremlin and seizing the city's central post office, however their uprising was soon put down by Trotsky and two Latvian battalions. The party's leaders and many of their members were arrested and imprisoned, although the Bolsheviks showed greater lenience toward them the Left SRs than they had done to many of their other critics. On 9 July, at the Fifth All-Russian Congress of Soviets, a ban was declared on the party being involved in any of the country's soviets.

The Bolsheviks primarily held the area of Great Russia, while the White opposition were situated largely in the peripheries of the former Empire, in regions dominated by non-Russian ethnic groups. Significantly, the Bolsheviks held control of Russia's two largest cities, Moscow and Petrograd. Aiding the Red war effort was that the Bolsheviks' anti-capitalist stance appealed to many of the country's proletariat, while their redistribution of land appealed to much of the peasantry, and the ethnic Russian supremacism expressed by various White generals alienated certain ethnic minorities. Further hindering the White cause was that they were fragmented and geographically scattered, while the Whites also failed to produce an effective unifying message, with their pro-royalist statements generating little support. 13 million people died in the civil war.

In the summer of 1919, Denikin's armies were forced back into Ukraine, and from there into Crimea, with Denikin himself fleeing to Europe. In December 1919, the Red Army retook Kiev. By January 1920, the Whites had been defeated in Russia itself, although fighting continued in the Empire's former neighbouring territories. Although Lenin had allowed these non-Russian nations to cede from the Empire, he and the Bolsheviks desired to incorporate them into their new socialist state. Intent on establishing a Soviet Republic in Ukraine, he was concerned that the Ukrainian Communist Party had lacked widespread support among ethnic Ukrainians, and so persuaded the party to accept Borotbists – a group who had split from the Ukrainian Socialist-Revolutionary Party – to be incorporated into the Ukrainian Communist Party. Although Ukraine and Russia were officially presented as two separate states at this period, the Ukrainian Soviet government was strongly influenced by Lenin's government in Russia.

In July 1918, Yakov Sverdlov informed Lenin and the Sovnarkom that the Yekaterinburg Soviet had overseen the shooting of the Romanov family in order to prevent them from being rescued by advancing White troops. Although lacking proof, biographers and historians like Pipes Volkogonov have expressed the view that the killing itself was probably originally sanctioned by Lenin. For Lenin, the execution was axiomatic, and he highlighted the precedent set by the execution of Louis XVI in the French Revolution. The execution prevented the Romanovs being used as a rallying point by the White armies and would reiterate to the Russian population that there would be no monarchical restoration. Publicly, the death of Nicholas II was announced, although it was erroneously claimed that his immediate family remained alive.

In 1920, the Polish-Soviet War broke out after Poland attempted to annex parts of Belarus and Western Ukraine; by May 1920 they had conquered Kiev. After forcing the Polish army back, Lenin urged the Russian Army to push into Poland itself, believing that the Polish proletariat would rise up to support the Russian troops and thus spark European revolution. Although Trotsky and other Bolsheviks were sceptical, they eventually agreed to the invasion; however, the Polish proletariat failed to raise up against their government, and the Red Army was defeated at the Battle of Warsaw. Lenin had also sent a note to E. M. Sulyanski, in which he called on the Red Army to hang kulaks, clergy, and landed gentry, before blaming these attacks on Green armies. The Polish armies began to push the Red Army back into Russia, forcing Sovnarkom to sue for peace; the war culminated in the Peace of Riga, a treaty in which Russia ceded territory to Poland and paid them reparations.

=== Red Terror, famine, and the New Economic Policy ===
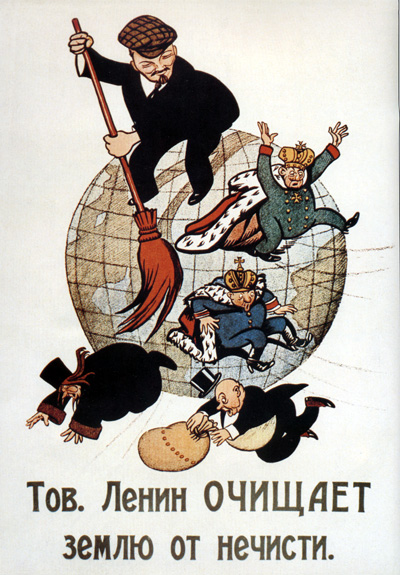
Bolshevik political cartoon poster from 1920, showing Lenin sweeping away monarchists and capitalists; the caption reads, "Comrade Lenin Cleanses the Earth of Filth"

While Lenin was absent, of 5 September 1918 Sovnarkom passed a decree, "On Red Terror", which Lenin later endorsed. This decree called for perceived class enemies of the proletariat to be isolated in concentration camps, and for those aiding the White Armies or rebellions to be shot; it decreed that the names of those executed should then be published. The purpose of the Red Terror was to eliminate the bourgeoisie as a class, an aim that was repeatedly called for within the Bolshevik press. However, it was not simply bourgeoise who were executed, but also many others who were deemed to oppose the Bolsheviks. The Cheka claimed the right to both sentence and execute anyone whom it deemed to be an enemy of the government, without recourse to the Revolutionary Tribunals. Accordingly, throughout Soviet Russia the Cheka carried out executions, often in large numbers, with the Petrograd Cheka for instance shot 512 people to death over the course of a few days. The cycle of violence was not purely initiated by the Bolsheviks, who were targets of violence as well as its perpetrators.

Given that he rarely left Moscow, Lenin never witnessed this violence first hand. He sought to publicly distance himself from such violence, rarely signing his name to the Sovnarkom's repressive decrees. Similarly, he did not typically call for the shooting of counter-revolutionaries and traitors within his published articles and public speeches, although he regularly did so in his coded telegrams and confidential notes. Many middle-ranking Bolsheviks expressed disapproval of the Cheka's mass executions and feared the organisation's apparent unaccountability for its actions. The Party brought in attempts to restrain its activities in early 1919, stripping it of its powers of tribunal and execution, however this only applied in those few areas not under official martial law; the Cheka therefore were able to continue their activities as before in large swathes of the country. By 1920, the Cheka had become the most powerful institution in Soviet Russia, exerting influence over all other state apparatus, to the extent that Pipes considered the country to be a police state. There are no surviving records to provide an accurate figure of how many perished due to the Red Terror, although the later estimates of historians have ranged from 50,000 to 140,000. The majority of these were either well-to-do citizens or members of the Tsarist administration.

The establishment of concentration camps was entrusted to the Cheka, with Dzerzhinsky orchestrating their construction from the spring of 1919 onward. Sovnarkom ordered every provincial and district capital to establish such camps. They would subsequently be administered by a new government agency, Gulag. By the end of 1920, 84 camps had been established across Soviet Russia, holding circa 50,000 prisoners; by October 1923, this had grown to 315 camps with approximately 70,000 inmates. Those interned in the camps were effectively used as a form of slave labor.

Militantly atheist, the Communist Party wanted to demolish organised religion, with the new government declaring the separation of church and state, while the Bolshevik press denounced priests and other religious figures as counter-revolutionaries. During the Russian famine of 1921, Patriarch Tikhon called on Orthodox churches to sell unnecessary items to help feed the starving, an action endorsed by the government. In February 1922 Sovnarkom went further by calling on all valuables belonging to religious institutions to be forcibly appropriated and sold. Tikhon opposed the sale of any items used within the Eucharist, and many clergy resisted the appropriations. Facing this resistance, Lenin issued a decree in May 1922 calling for the execution of priests. Between 14,000 and 20,000 priests were killed as a result. Although the Russian Orthodox Church – the largest religious organisation in Russia – was worst affected, the government's anti-religious policies also impacted on Roman Catholic churches, Jewish synagogues, and Islamic mosques.

Caused in part by a drought, the famine that affected Russia was the most severe that the country had experienced since that of 1891. The famine was exacerbated by the government's requisitioning efforts, as well as their decision to continue exporting large quantities of Russian grain rather than using it for domestic consumption. In 1920 and 1921, Russia witnessed a number of peasant uprisings against the government, sparked by local opposition to the requisitioning, but these were suppressed. Among the most significant was the Tambov Rebellion, which was put down by the Red Army. To aid the famine victims, Herbert Hoover, the future President of the United States, established an American Relief Administration to distribute food. Lenin was suspicious of this aid, and had it closely monitored. Within the Communist Party itself there was dissent from both the Group of Democratic Centralism and the Workers' Opposition, both of whom criticised the Russian state for being too centralised and bureaucratic. The Workers' Opposition, who had connections to the state's official trade unions, also expressed the concern that the government had lost the trust of Russia's working class. The 'trade union discussion' preoccupied much of the party's focus in this period; Trotsky angered the Workers' Opposition by suggesting that the trade unions be eliminated, seeing them as superfluous in a "workers' state", but Lenin disagreed, believing it best to allow their continued existence, and most of the Bolsheviks eventually embraced this latter view. Seeking to deal with the problem of these dissenting factions, at the Tenth Party Congress in February 1921, Lenin brought about a ban on factional activity within the party, under pain of expulsion.

"[Y]ou must attempt first to build small bridges which shall lead to a land of small peasant holdings through State Capitalism to Socialism. Otherwise you will never lead tens of millions of people to Communism. This is what the objective forces of the development of the Revolution have taught."

— Lenin on the NEP, 1921.

In February 1921, workers went on strike in Petrograd, resulting in the government proclaiming martial law in the city and sending in the Red Army to quell demonstrations. On 1 March 1921, the Kronstadt rebellion began as sailors in Kronstadt revolted against the Bolshevik government, demanding that all socialists be given freedom of press, that independent trade unions be given freedom of assembly, and that peasants be allowed free markets and not be the subject to forced requisitioning. Lenin sent Mikhail Kalinin to talk to the rebelling sailors, but they rejected his arguments and denounced the Bolshevik administration, calling for a return to rule by the soviets. On 2 March, Lenin and Trotsky issued an order in which they described the Kronstadt sailors as "tools of former Tsarist generals". Trotsky ordered the sailors to surrender, and when they refused he began bombing them and attacking them; the rebellion was subdued on 17 March, with thousands dead and many survivors sent to labor camps

In the face of famine and peasant uprisings, Lenin met with a number of peasant delegates to discuss the issues involved, concluding that the government's popularity was at its lowest point. Acknowledging Russia's economic woes, in February 1921 he suggested the introduction of a New Economic Policy (NEP) to the Politburo, eventually convincing most senior Bolsheviks of its necessity. He subsequently gained support for the move at the 10th Party Congress, held in March, with the NEP passing as law in April. Lenin explained the policy in a booklet, On the Food Tax, in which he stated that the NEP represented return to the Bolsheviks' original economic plans, but which had been derailed by the civil war, in which they had been forced to resort to an economic policy which he now called "war communism", a term first developed by Bogdanov. Designed to allow for renewed economic growth, the NEP allowed for the restoration of some private enterprise within Russia, permitting the reintroduction of the wage system and allowing peasants to sell much of their produce on the open market. The policy also allowed for a return to privately owned small industry, although basic industry, transportation, and foreign trade all remained under state control. Lenin termed this "state capitalism", although many Bolsheviks thought it to be a betrayal of socialist principles. Expressing the view that "the efficient peasant must be the central figure of our economic recovery", he argued that Russia's peasantry lacked socialist values and that it would take time for them to learn them, and that the introduction of socialist reforms to agriculture through the formation of collectivised farms would have to wait. Similarly, he argued that the NEP was still Marxist because capitalist elements were needed to develop the units of production to a level where they could then be socialised as state property. Lenin biographers have often characterised the introduction of the NEP as one of Lenin's most significant achievements, with Service suggesting that had it not been implemented then the Bolshevik government would have been quickly overthrown amid popular uprisings.

Seeking to establish trade links in order to advance their own economy, the Soviet Union sent a delegate to the Genoa Conference; Lenin had hoped to attend himself, but was prevented by ill health. The new government also signed a commercial and diplomatic treaty with Germany, the Treaty of Rapallo, as well as the Anglo-Soviet Trade Agreement with the United Kingdom in March 1921, seeking to encourage the Russo-Asiatic Corporation of Great Britain to revive its copper mining operations within Russia. Lenin hoped that by allowing foreign corporations to invest in Russia, it would exacerbate rivalries between the capitalist nations and hasten their downfall; for instance, he unsuccessfully attempted to rent the oil fields of Kamchatka to an American corporation in order to exacerbate tensions between the U.S. and Japan, who desired Kamchatka for their empire. In 1922, Dmitry Kursky, the People's Commissar for Justice, began the formation of a new criminal code for the RSFR; Lenin aided him in doing so, asking that terror "be substantiated and legalized in principle" and that the use of capital punishment by expanded for usage in a wider array of crimes.

=== Communist International ===
"The International World Revolution is near, although revolutions are never made to order. Imperialism cannot delay the world revolution. The imperialists will set fire to the entire world and will start a conflagration in which they themselves will perish if they dare to quell the Revolution."

— Lenin, 11 November 1918.

After the Armistice on the Western Front, Lenin believed that the breakout of world revolution was imminent, particularly in Europe. His government supported the establishment of the Hungarian Soviet Republic, led by Béla Kun, in March 1919, as well as the establishment of the Bavarian Council Republic and various revolutionary socialist uprisings in other parts of Germany, among them that of the Spartacus League. They funded not only communist groups in Europe but also those active in various parts of Asia, including Korea, China, India, and Persia.

In late 1918, the British Labour Party called for the establishment of an international conference of socialist parties, the Labour and Socialist International. Lenin saw this as a revival of the Second International which he had despised and decided to offset its impact by formulating his own rival conference of international socialists. Lenin set about organising such a conference with the aid of Zinoviev, Trotsky, Christian Rakovsky, and Angelica Balabanoff.

On 2 March 1919, the First Congress of the Communist International ("Comintern") opened in Moscow. It lacked a global coverage; of the 34 assembled delegates, 30 resided within the countries of the former Russian Empire, and most of the international delegates were not officially recognised by the socialist parties within their own nations. Accordingly, the Bolsheviks dominated proceedings, with Lenin subsequently authoring a series of regulations that meant that only socialist parties that endorsed the Bolsheviks' views were permitted to join Comintern. Comintern remained financially reliant on the Soviet government. During the first conference, Lenin spoke to the delegates, lambasting the parliamentary path to socialism espoused by revisionist Marxists like Kautsky and repeating his calls for a violent overthrow of Europe's bourgeoisie governments. While Zinoviev became the International's President, Lenin continued to wield great control over it.

The First Congress of the Communist International was followed by the Eighth Congress of the Bolsheviks, at which Lenin was repeatedly criticised for the measures that his government had implemented. One point of criticism surrounded Lenin's granting of national to sovereignty for Finland; there, a soviet republic had failed to materialise, with a monarchy having been created instead.

The Second Congress of the Communist International opened in Petrograd's Smolny Institute in June 1920, representing the last time that Lenin visited a city other than Moscow. There, he encouraged foreign delegates to emulate the Bolsheviks' seizure of power, and abandoned his longstanding viewpoint that capitalism was a necessary stage in societal development, instead encouraging those nations under colonial occupation to transform their pre-capitalist societies straight into socialist ones. For this conference, he authored "Left-Wing" Communism: An Infantile Disorder, a short book in which he articulated his criticism of far left elements within the British and German communist parties who refused to enter those nations' parliamentary systems and trade unions; instead he urged them to do so in order to advance the revolutionary cause. The conference had to be suspended for several days due to the ongoing war with Poland, before the Congress subsequently moved to Moscow, where it continued to hold sessions until August. However, Lenin's predicted world revolution failed to materialise, as the Hungarian Soviet Republic was overthrown and the German Marxist uprisings suppressed

=== Lenin's declining health and the Soviet Union ===
A number of prominent Western socialists travelled to Russia, during which they met with Lenin; these included the philosopher Bertrand Russell in summer 1920 and the author H. G. Wells in September 1920, the latter having been introduced to Lenin through Gorky. He was also visited by the anarchists Emma Goldman and Alexander Berkman in January 1920. In April 1920, the Bolsheviks held a party to celebrate Lenin's fiftieth birthday, with widespread celebrations taking place across Russia and poems and biographies dedicated to him being published. All of this embarrassed and horrified Lenin himself. Between 1920 and 1926, twenty volumes of Lenin's Collected Works were edited by Kamenev and published; that material which was deemed inappropriate for the needs of the Soviet government were omitted. He became increasingly concerned with the illness of his close friend Inessa Armand, who visited him at the Kremlin on several occasions; although she temporarily recovered, she subsequently relapsed. He sent her to a sanatorium in Kislovodsk, Northern Caucusus in order to recover, but there she contracted cholera during a local epidemic and died in September 1920. Her body was transported by train to Moscow, arriving there in October, where Lenin collected the coffin from the train station; observers noted that he was overcome by grief. Her corpse was buried beneath the Kremlin Wall. During his leadership of the Soviet administration, Lenin struggled against the state bureaucracy and the corruption within it, and became increasingly concerned by this in his final years. Condemning such bureaucratic attitudes, he suggested a total overhaul of the Russian system to deal with such problems, in one letter complaining that "we are being sucked into a foul bureaucratic swamp".

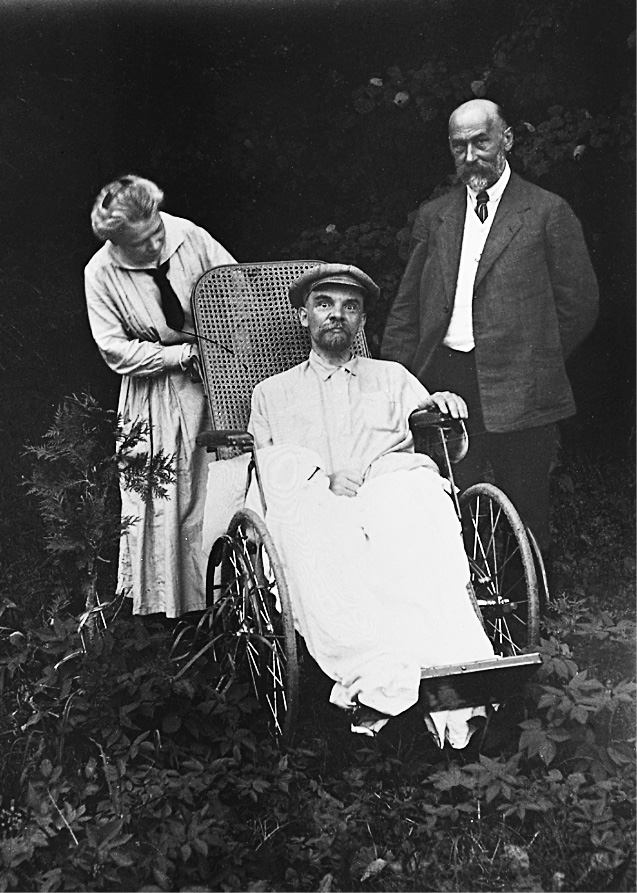
Lenin in 1923

Lenin had become seriously ill by the latter half of 1921, however continued working hard. He was suffering from hyperacusis and insomnia, as well as regular headaches. At the Politburo's insistence, On 13 July he left Moscow for a month's leave, spending the time at his Gorki mansion. There, he was cared for by his wife and sister, Maria Ilinichna, who visited on weekends. On 13 November 1921 he spoke at the Comintern Congress, although in December had to return to Gorki to recuperate. Lenin began to contemplate the possibility of suicide, asking both Krupskaya and Stalin to acquire potassium cyanide for him. In total, 26 physicians would be hired to help Lenin during his final years; many of them were foreign, and had been hired at great expense. Some suggested that his sickness could have been caused by metal oxidation arising from the bullets that were lodged in his body; in April 1922 he underwent a surgical operation to remove them at Soldatenkov Hospital. The symptoms continued after this, with Lenin's doctors unsure of the cause; some believed that he was suffering from neurasthenia or cerebral arteriosclerosis, or a combination of these diseases. In May 1922, he then suffered his first stroke, temporarily losing his ability to speak and being paralysed on his right side. He convalesced at Gorky, and had largely recovered by July. He returned to Moscow in October 1922, although his condition again deteriorated the next month. In December 1922 he suffered his second stroke and returned to Gorky.

Between June and August 1922, a trial of the SR leaders was held in which they were found guilty of conspiring against the government. Lenin urged for their execution, although other Bolsheviks cautioned against this, suggesting that they be kept imprisoned indefinitely under the threat of execution if any further SR attempts against the government were made. This attitude prevailed, and the SR leaders were kept in prison until later being killed during the Great Purges of Stalin's leadership. The Bolsheviks continued to oppose the Mensheviks and their calls for a more democratic basis to socialism. In March 1923, while Lenin was ill, the Politburo ordered the expulsion of any Mensheviks from state institutions and enterprises, and their banishment to labor camps in Narym; their children were to be sent to a camp in Pechera, ultimately resulting in the virtual eradication of Menshevism in Russia.

In October 1922, Lenin proposed that Trotsky should become first deputy chairman of the Council of People's Commissars at a meeting of the Central Committee, but Trotsky declined the position. During December 1922 and January 1923 Lenin dictated a Postscript, "Lenin's Testament", in which he discussed the personal qualities of his comrades, particularly Trotsky and Stalin. Here, he recommended that Stalin be removed from his position as General Secretary, deeming him inappropriate for the position. Instead he presented Trotsky as the best suited person for the position, describing him as "the most capable man in the present Central Committee"; he highlighted Trotsky's superior intellect but at the same time criticized his self-assurance and inclination toward excess administration. According to Stalin’s secretary, Boris Bazhanov, Lenin “in general leaned towards a collegial leadership, with Trotsky in the first position”. Concerned at the survival of the Tsarist bureaucratic system in Soviet Russia, during this period he dictated a criticism of the bureaucratic nature of the Workers' and Peasants' Inspectorate, calling for the recruitment of new, working-class staff as an antidote to this problem. In another article, "On Co-operation", he emphasized the need for the state to enhance literacy and numeracy in Russia and to encourage punctuality and conscientiousness within the populace, as well as calling for the peasants to join co-operatives.

"Stalin is too crude, and this defect which is entirely acceptable in our milieu and in relationships among us as communists, becomes unacceptable in the position of General Secretary. I therefore propose to comrades that they should devise a means of removing him from this job and should appoint to this job someone else who is distinguished from comrade Stalin in all other respects only by the single superior aspect that he should be more tolerant, more polite and more attentive towards comrades, less capricious, etc."

— Lenin, 4 January 1923.

In Lenin's absence, Stalin – by now the General Secretary of the Communist Party – had begun consolidating his power by appointing his supporters to prominent positions, with Lenin being almost unique in recognising that Stalin was likely to dominate the party in future. Publicly, Stalin sought to cultivate an image of himself as Lenin's closest intimate, and his deserving successor as Soviet leader, while the other senior Bolsheviks also circled for positions of power. In December 1922, as Lenin's health deteriorated, Stalin took responsibility for his regimen, and was tasked by the Politburo with controlling who had access to him. Lenin was however becoming increasingly critical of Stalin; while Lenin was insisting that the state should retain its monopoly on international trade during the summer of 1922, Stalin was leading a number of other Bolsheviks in unsuccessfully opposing this. There were personal arguments between the two as well; Stalin had upset Krupskaya by shouting at her during a phone conversation, which in turn greatly angered Lenin, who sent Stalin a letter expressing his annoyance.

However, the most significant political division between the two emerged during the Georgian Affair. Stalin had suggested that Georgia, as well as other neighbouring countries like Azerbaijan and Armenia, should be merged into the Russian state, despite the protestations of their national governments. Lenin saw this as an expression of Great Russian ethnic chauvinism on behalf of Stalin and his supporters, instead calling for these nation-states to join Russia as semi-independent parts of a greater union, which he suggested by called the Union of Soviet Republics of Europe and Asia. Stalin ultimately relented to this proposal, although changed the name of the newly proposed state to the Union of Soviet Socialist Republics (USSR), which Lenin agreed to. Lenin sent Trotsky to speak on his behalf at a Central Committee plenum in December, where the plans for the USSR were sanctioned; these plans were then ratified on 30 December by the Congress of Soviets, resulting in the formation of the Soviet Union.

In March, Lenin suffered a third stroke and lost his ability to speak; that month, he experienced partial paralysis on his right side and began exhibiting sensory aphasia. By May, he appeared to be making a slow recovery, as he began to regain his mobility, speech, and writing skills. On 18 October 1923, he made a final visit to Moscow and the Kremlin. In this final period of his life, Lenin was visited by Zinoviev, Kamenev, and Bukharin, with the latter visiting him at his Gorki dacha on the day of his death. Lenin died at his Gorki home on 21 January 1924, having fallen into a coma earlier in the day. His official cause of death was recorded as an "incurable disease of the blood vessels".

=== Funeral ===
The Soviet government publicly announced Lenin's death the following day, with head of State Mikhail Kalinin tearfully reading an official statement to delegates of the All-Russian Congress of Soviets at 11am, the same time that a team of physicians began a postmortem of the body. On 23 January, mourners from the Communist Party Central Committee, the Moscow party organisation, the trade unions and the soviets began to assemble at his house, with the body being removed from his home at about 10am the following day, being carried aloft in a red coffin by Kamenev, Zinoviev, Stalin, Bukharin, Bubhov and Krasin. Transported by train to Moscow, mourners gathered at every station along the way, and upon arriving in the city, a funerary procession carried the coffin for five miles to the House of Trade Unions, where the body lay in state.

Over the next three days, around a million mourners from across the Soviet Union came to see the body, many queuing for hours in the freezing conditions, with the events being filmed by the government. On Saturday 26 January, the eleventh All-Union Congress of Soviets met to pay respects to the deceased leader, with speeches being made by Kalinin, Zinoviev and Stalin, but notably not Trotsky, who had been convalescing in the Caucasus. Lenin's funeral took place the following day, when his body was carried to Red Square, accompanied by martial music, where assembled crowds listened to a series of speeches before the corpse was carried into a vault, followed by the singing of the revolutionary hymn, "You fell in sacrifice." Despite the freezing temperatures, tens of thousands attended the funeral.
