= Kropotkin, Krasnodar Krai =

Town in Krasnodar Krai, Russia

Kropotkin Кропоткин
- Town
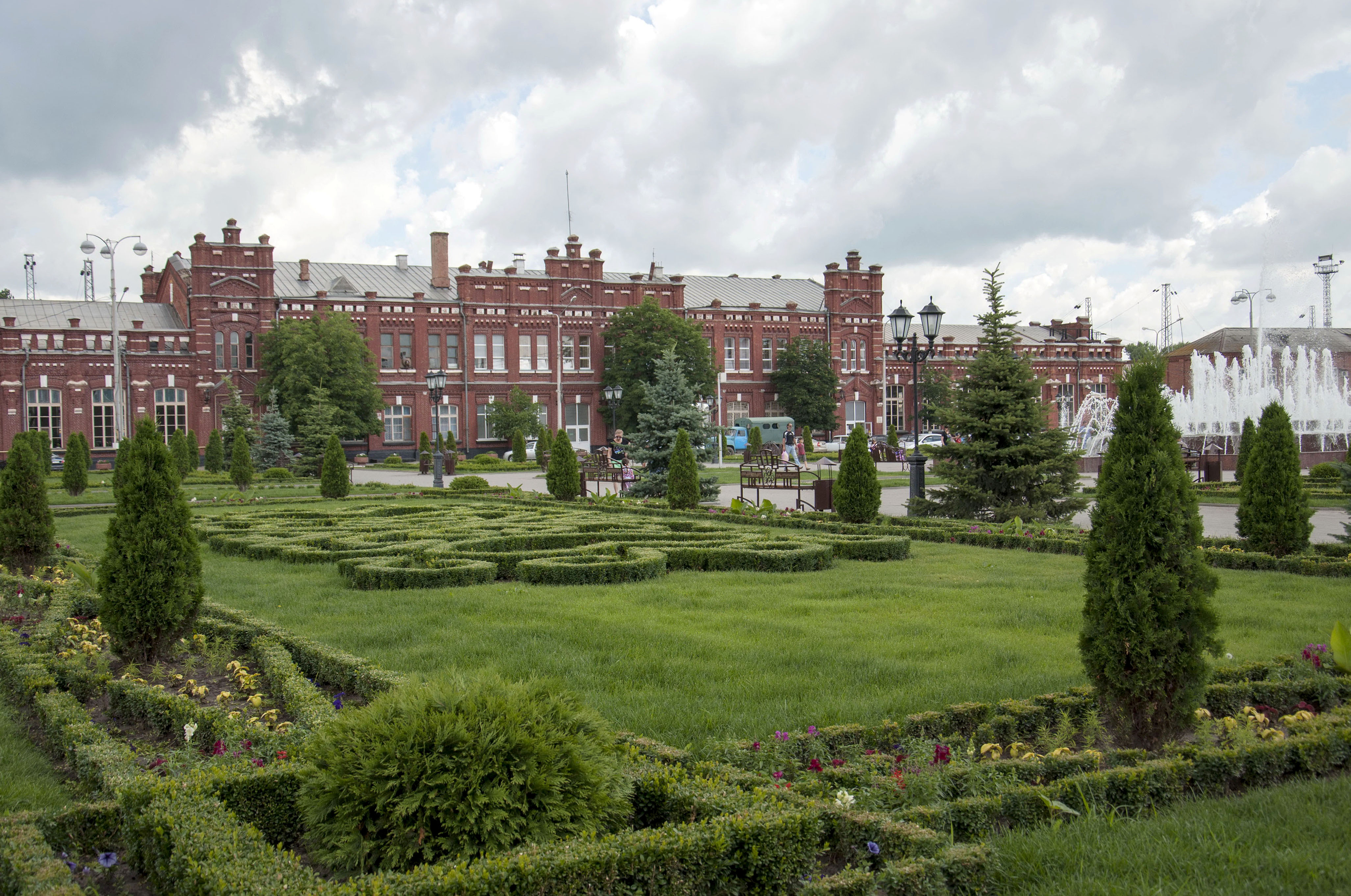
- Railway station, Kropotkin

- Flag Coat of arms
- Interactive map of Kropotkin
- Location of Kropotkin Kropotkin (European Russia) Kropotkin (Russia)
- Coordinates: 45°26′N 40°34′E
- Country: Russia
- Federal subject: Krasnodar Krai
- Founded: late 18th century
- Town status since: 1921
- Elevation: 80 m (260 ft)

Population (2010 Census)
  - Total: 80,765
  - Estimate (2025): 73,854 (−8.6%)
  - Rank: 205th in 2010

Administrative status
  - Subordinated to: Town of Kropotkin
  - Capital of: Town of Kropotkin, Kavkazsky District

Municipal status
  - Municipal district: Kavkazsky Municipal District
  - Urban settlement: Kropotkinskoye Urban Settlement
  - Capital of: Kavkazsky Municipal District, Kropotkinskoye Urban Settlement
- Time zone: UTC+3 (MSK)
- Postal code: 352380–352396
- OKTMO ID: 03618101001
- Website: www.gorod-kropotkin.ru

Kropotkin (Russian: Кропо́ткин; until 1921 Romanovsky, Russian: Романовский, Ukrainian: Романовський, romanized: Romanovskyy) is a town in Krasnodar Krai, Russia, located on the right bank of the Kuban River.

== History ==
It was founded as Romanovsky khutor in the late 18th century, and was renamed Kropotkin in honor of the natural scientist, geographer and revolutionary anarchist Prince Pyotr Alexeyevich Kropotkin on 4 February 1921, when it was granted town status. Population: 80,765 (2010 census); 79,185 (2002 census); 75,929 (1989 Soviet census); 70,000 (1972); 42,000 (1939); 30,954 (1926) According to the 1926 census, the population was 52.1% Russian, 35.5% Ukrainian, 4.6% Armenian, 2.7% Belarusian, 0.8% Tatar, 0.7% German and 0.6% Polish.

== Administrative and municipal status ==
Within the framework of administrative divisions, it is incorporated as the Town of Kropotkin—an administrative unit with the status equal to that of the districts. As a municipal division, the Town of Kropotkin is incorporated within Kavkazsky Municipal District as Kropotkinskoye Urban Settlement.

== Transportation ==
The town's railway station is named Kavkazskaya.

== Notable people ==
- Marcos Grigorian, art gallery owner
- Gennady Kovalev, boxer
- Irina Pershina, swimmer
- Tatyana Kostyrina, World War II sniper
- Vladimir Tumanov, legal scholar
- Yuri Zhuravlyov, football player
