= Kavkazskaya (rural locality) =

Kavkazskaya Кавказская
- Stanitsa
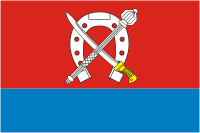
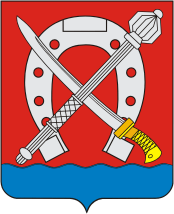
- Flag Coat of arms
- Interactive map of Kavkazskaya
- Location of Kavkazskaya Kavkazskaya (Krasnodar Krai)
- Coordinates: 45°27′N 40°41′E
- Country: Russia
- Federal subject: Krasnodar Krai
- Administrative district: Kavkazsky District
- Founded: 1794
- Elevation: 130 m (430 ft)

Population (2010 Census)
  - Total: 11,164
  - Estimate (2023): 10,089 (−9.6%)

Administrative status
  - Capital of: Kavkazsky District
- Time zone: UTC+3 (MSK)
- Postal code: 352140
- Dialing code: +7 86193
- OKTMO ID: 03618410101

Kavkazskaya (Russian: Кавка́зская; Ukrainian: Кавказька, romanized: Kavkazka) is a rural locality (a stanitsa) and the administrative center of Kavkazsky District in Krasnodar Krai, Russia, located on the Kuban River. Population: 11,164 (2010 census); 11,531 (2002 census); 10,755 (1989 Soviet census). The stanitsa was the administrative center of the Kavkazsky Otdel of the Kuban Oblast.
