= Kavkazsky District =

Kavkazsky District Кавказский район (Russian)
- District
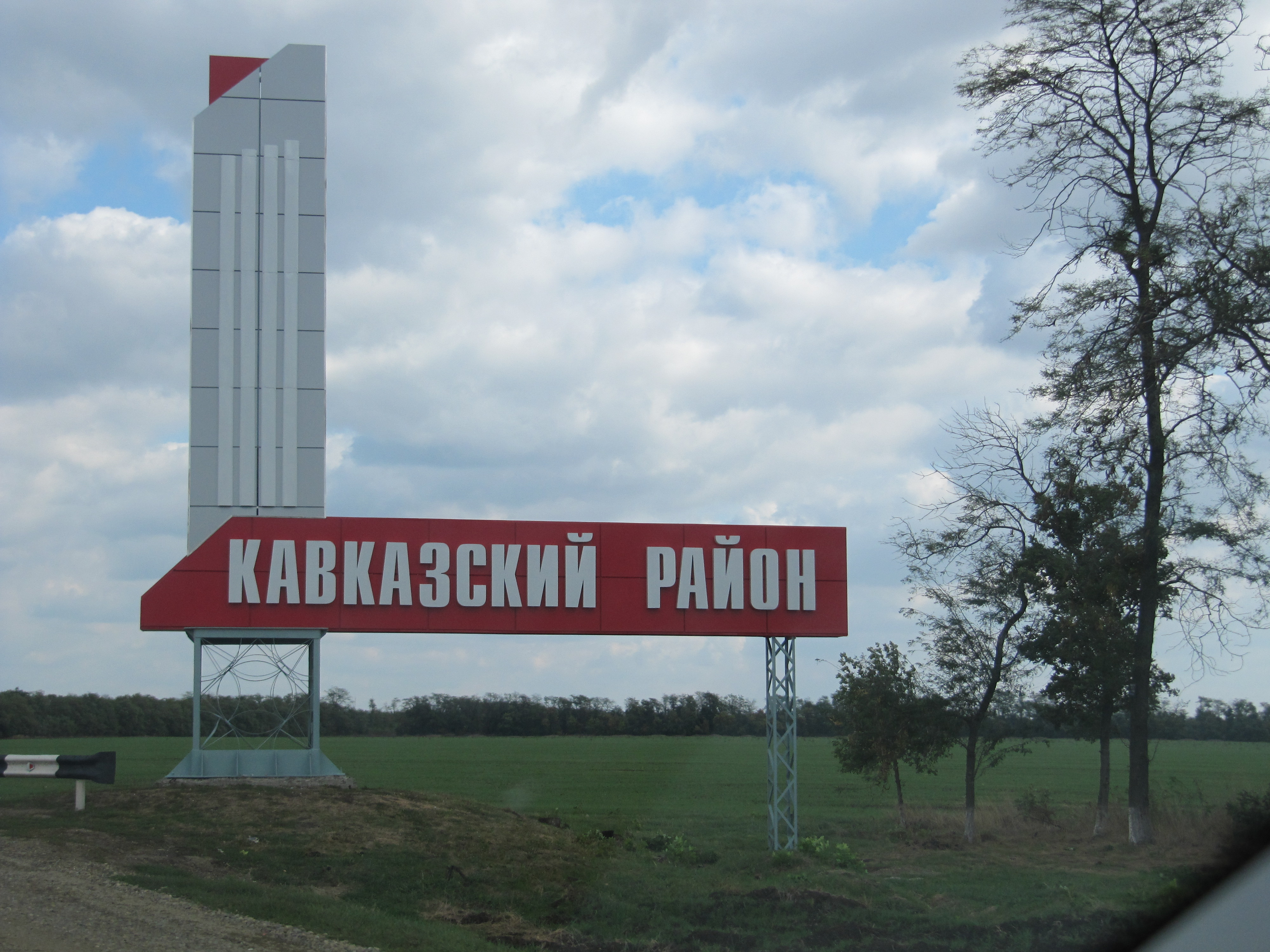
- Welcome sign at the entrance to Kavkazsky District

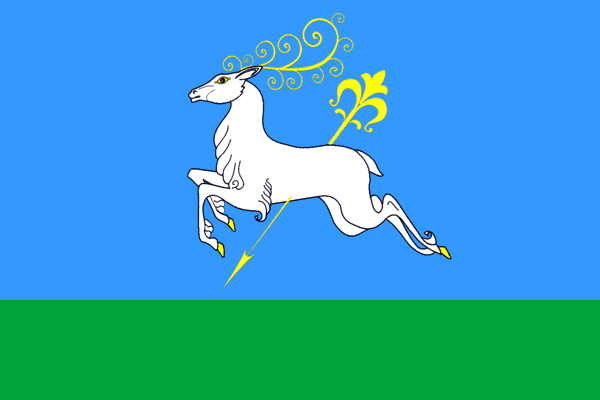
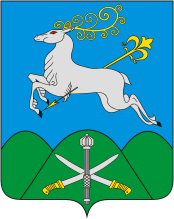
- Flag Coat of arms
- Location of Kavkazsky District in Krasnodar Krai
- Coordinates: 45°26′12″N 40°34′50″E
- Country: Russia
- Federal subject: Krasnodar Krai
- Established: June 2, 1924
- Administrative center: Kavkazskaya

Area
  - Total: 1,214 km^{2} (469 sq mi)

Population (2010 Census)
  - Total: 44,445
  - Density: 36.61/km^{2} (94.82/sq mi)
  - Urban: 0%
  - Rural: 100%

Administrative structure
  - Administrative divisions: 8 Rural okrugs
  - Inhabited localities: 28 rural localities

Municipal structure
  - Municipally incorporated as: Kavkazsky Municipal District
  - Municipal divisions: 1 urban settlements, 8 rural settlements
- Time zone: UTC+3 (MSK)
- OKTMO ID: 03618000
- Website: http://www.kavraion.ru/

Kavkazsky District (Russian: Кавка́зский райо́н) is an administrative district (raion), one of the thirty-eight in Krasnodar Krai, Russia. As a municipal division, it is incorporated as Kavkazsky Municipal District. It is located in the east of the krai. The area of the district is 1,214 square kilometers (469 sq mi). Its administrative center is the rural locality (a stanitsa) of Kavkazskaya. Population: 44,445 (2010 census); 45,343 (2002 census); 43,625 (1989 Soviet census). The population of Kavkazskaya accounts for 25.1% of the district's total population.

== History ==
The district was established on June 2, 1924 as Kropotkinsky District (Кропоткинский район), with the administrative center in the stanitsa of Kavkazskaya. It was given its current name on January 22, 1944. In 1956, the administrative center of the district was transferred to the town of Kropotkin. On February 1, 1963, the district was transformed into a rural district with the administrative center in the town of Gulkevichi. On January 12, 1965, this transformation was reverted. On October 20, 1980, the stanitsa of Kavkazskaya became the administrative center again.

== Administrative and municipal status ==
Within the framework of administrative divisions, the town of Kropotkin is not a part of the district and is incorporated separately. As a municipal division, however, Kropotkin is incorporated within Kavkazsky Municipal District as Kropotkinskoye Urban Settlement and serves as the municipal district's administrative center.
