= Kew Railway Bridge =

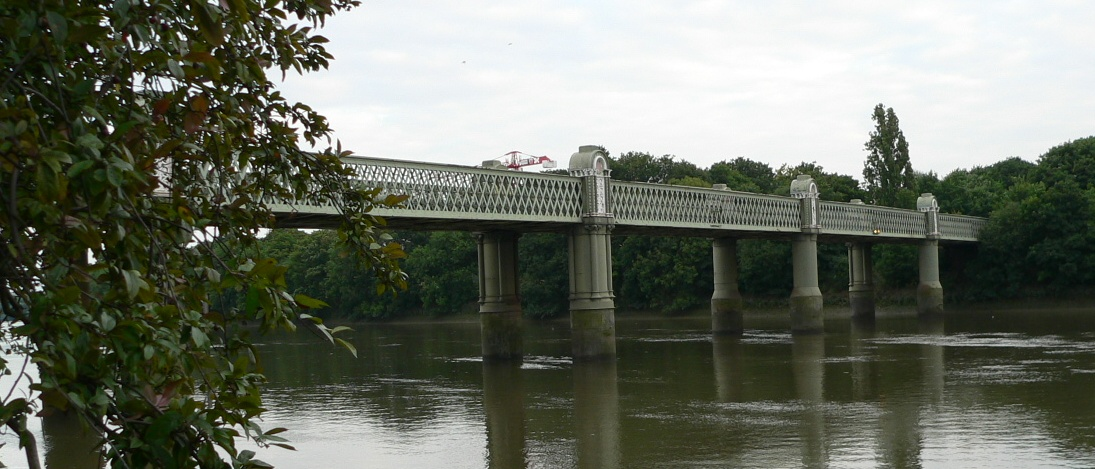
- Kew Railway Bridge
- Coordinates: 51°29′02″N 0°16′46″W
- Carries: North London Line of the London Overground; London Underground District line
- Crosses: River Thames
- Locale: Kew
- Maintained by: Network Rail
- Heritage status: Grade II listed structure

Characteristics
- Design: Lattice girder
- Material: Wrought iron
- Total length: 575 feet
- No. of spans: 5

History
- Designer: W. R. Galbraith
- Opened: 1 January 1869; 157 years ago

Statistics

Listed Building – Grade II
- Official name: Kew Railway Bridge
- Designated: 25 May 1983; 43 years ago
- Reference no.: 1065412

Location
- Interactive map of Kew Railway Bridge

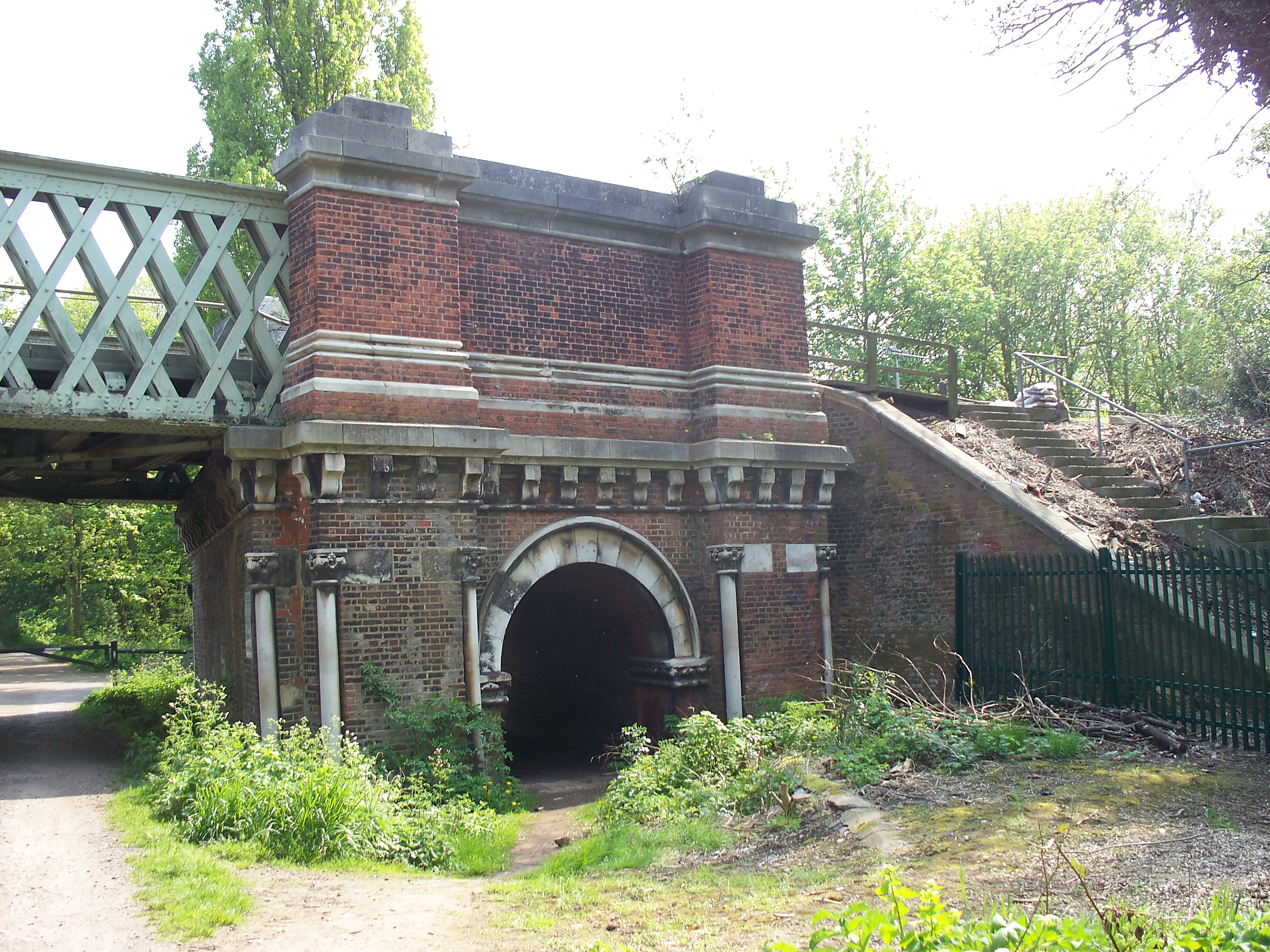
Kew Railway Bridge stonework

Kew Railway Bridge spans the River Thames in London, England, between Kew and Strand-on-the-Green, Chiswick. The bridge was opened in 1869.

== History ==
The bridge, which was given Grade II listed structure protection in 1983, was designed by W. R. Galbraith and built by Brassey & Ogilvie for the London and South Western Railway. The bridge is part of an extension to the latter company's railway line from Acton Junction to Richmond.

In 1964, the north arch under Kew Railway Bridge was acquired by Strand on the Green Sailing Club, and was rented from British Rail and then from Network Rail.

== Design ==
It consists of five wrought iron lattice girder spans of 35 metres each. The cast iron piers are decorated in three stages. During the Second World War a pillbox was built to guard it on the south end, along with an open enclosure to fire an anti-tank gun from.

The bridge carries two tracks which are electrified with both third rail and London Underground-style fourth rail. It is now owned by Network Rail and used by London Overground for Mildmay line passenger trains running between Richmond and Stratford. The same tracks are also used by London Underground's District line trains running between Richmond and Upminster.

== In fiction ==
In The Dalek Invasion of Earth, a 1964 serial from the BBC's Doctor Who, the TARDIS materialises under the bridge; it is trapped when the bridge collapses.

A District line train can be seen crossing the bridge in the 1965 film Four in the Morning.

== See also ==
- Crossings of the River Thames
- List of lattice girder bridges in the United Kingdom
- List of bridges in London
