= Strand-on-the-Green =

Riverside area in West London, England

Coordinates: 51.4847°N 0.2788°W

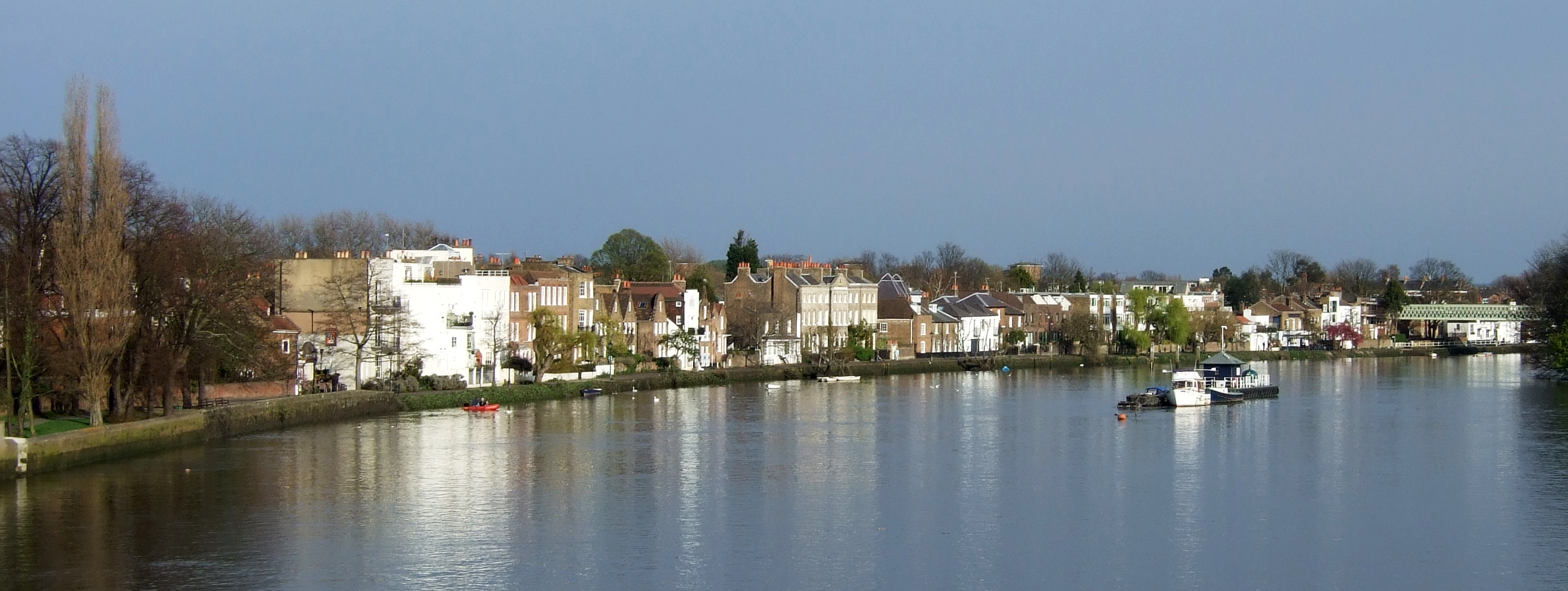
- Strand-on-the-Green as seen from Kew Bridge

- Location within Greater London
- OS grid reference: TQ193778
- London borough: Hounslow
- Ceremonial county: Greater London
- Region: London
- Country: England
- Sovereign state: United Kingdom
- Post town: LONDON
- Postcode district: W4
- Dialling code: 020
- UK Parliament: Hammersmith and Chiswick
- London Assembly: South West

Strand-on-the-Green is one of Chiswick's four medieval villages, and a "particularly picturesque" riverside area in West London. It is a conservation area, with many "imposing" listed buildings beside the River Thames; a local landmark, the Kew Railway Bridge that crosses the River Thames and the Strand, is itself Grade II listed. Oliver's Island is just offshore.

The area was a fishing village named "Stronde" in 1353. By the 18th century, it had become a place of river-trade with many different businesses. It became fashionable with the opening of Kew Bridge and the presence of the royal family at Kew Palace. Freight traffic declined with the opening of the Grand Junction Canal. Strand-on-the-Green became a residential area in the 20th century.

== Location ==
Strand-on-the-Green is the most westerly part of Chiswick. It is on the north bank of the River Thames, just downriver from Kew Bridge. The name is shared by the first part of the road east of Kew Bridge, its continuation on the riverside path, and the area itself. The riverside path is fronted by a row of "imposing" 18th-century houses, interspersed with three riverside public houses. The low-lying path borders a part of the tidal river whose capacity has been restricted by the building of embankments on both banks, and it is flooded at high water during spring tides. Houses on the street were occasionally flooded, for example in 1967, before the Thames Barrier was built to restrict the highest tides on the river.

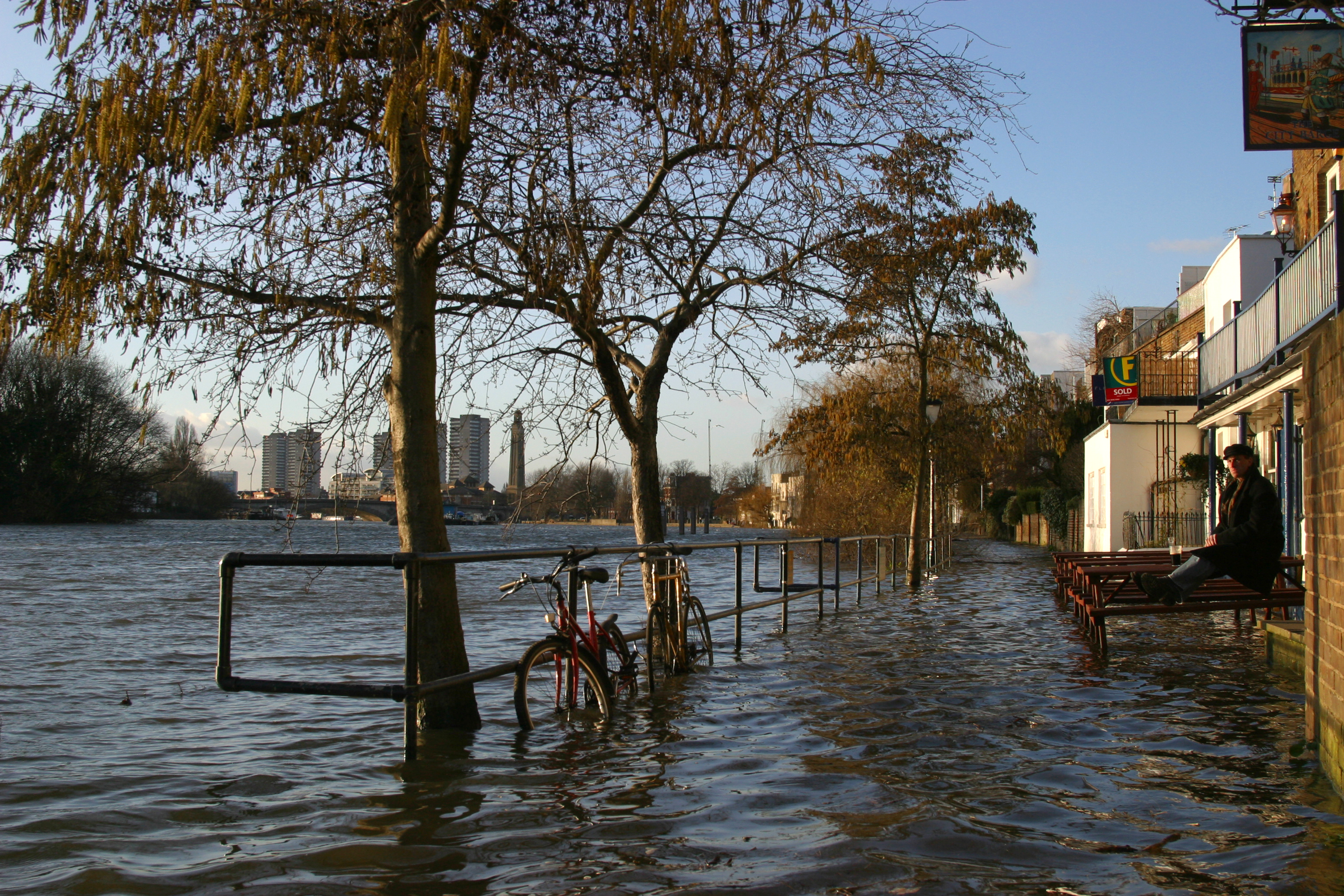
Tidal flooding by the City Barge pub

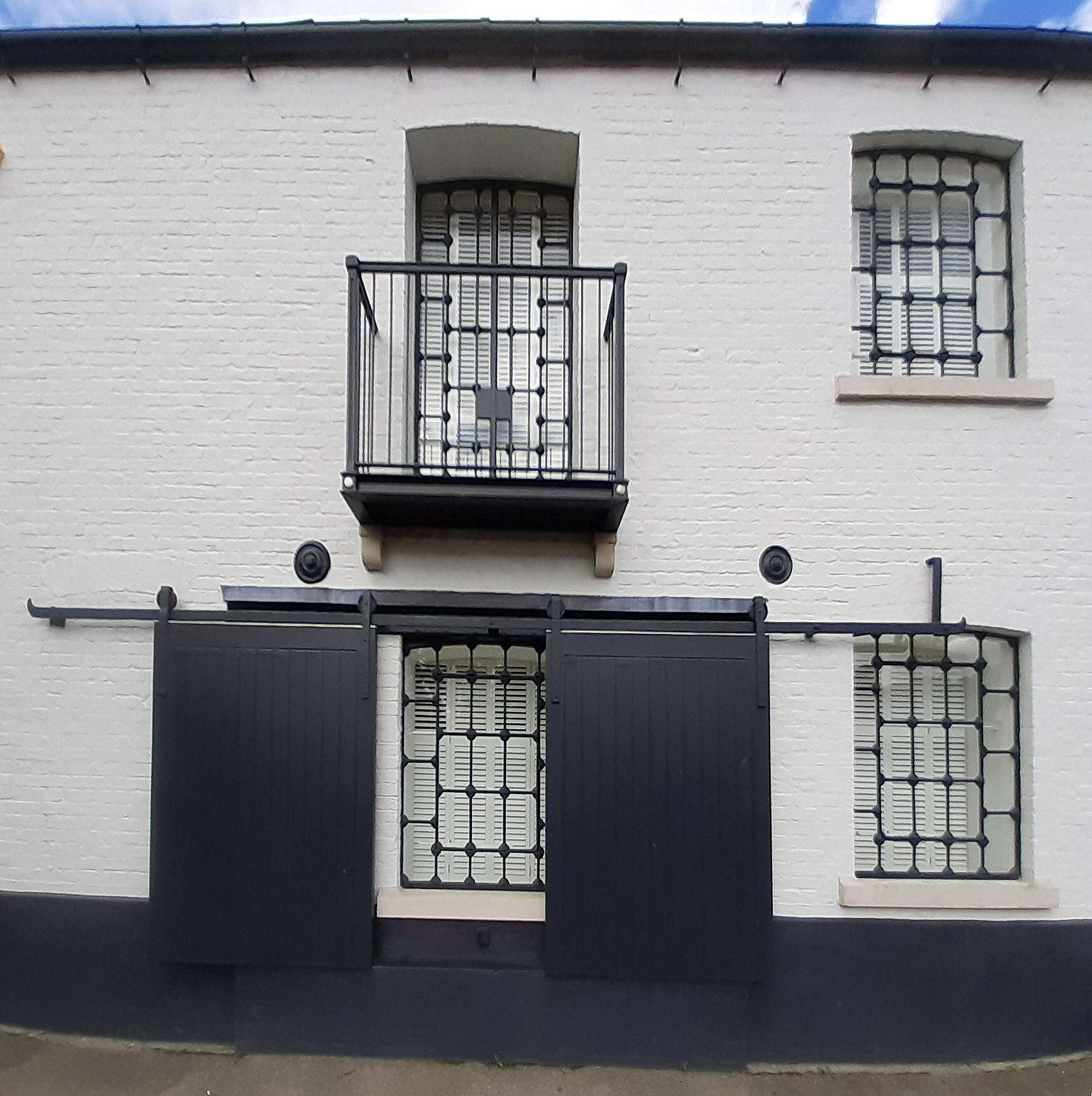
Flood defences

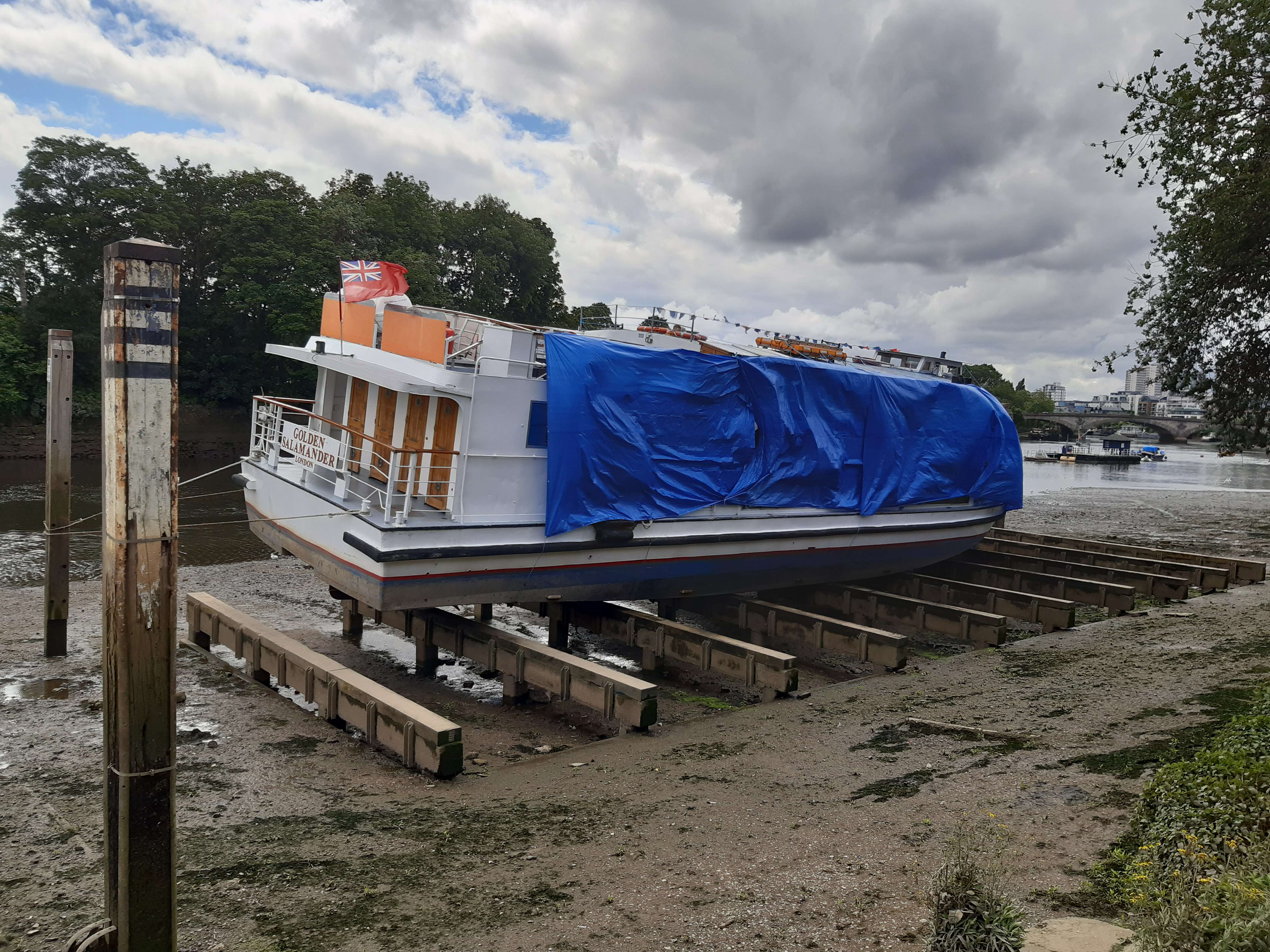
Golden Salamander resting on the barge standing at low tide

== History ==
=== Early origins ===
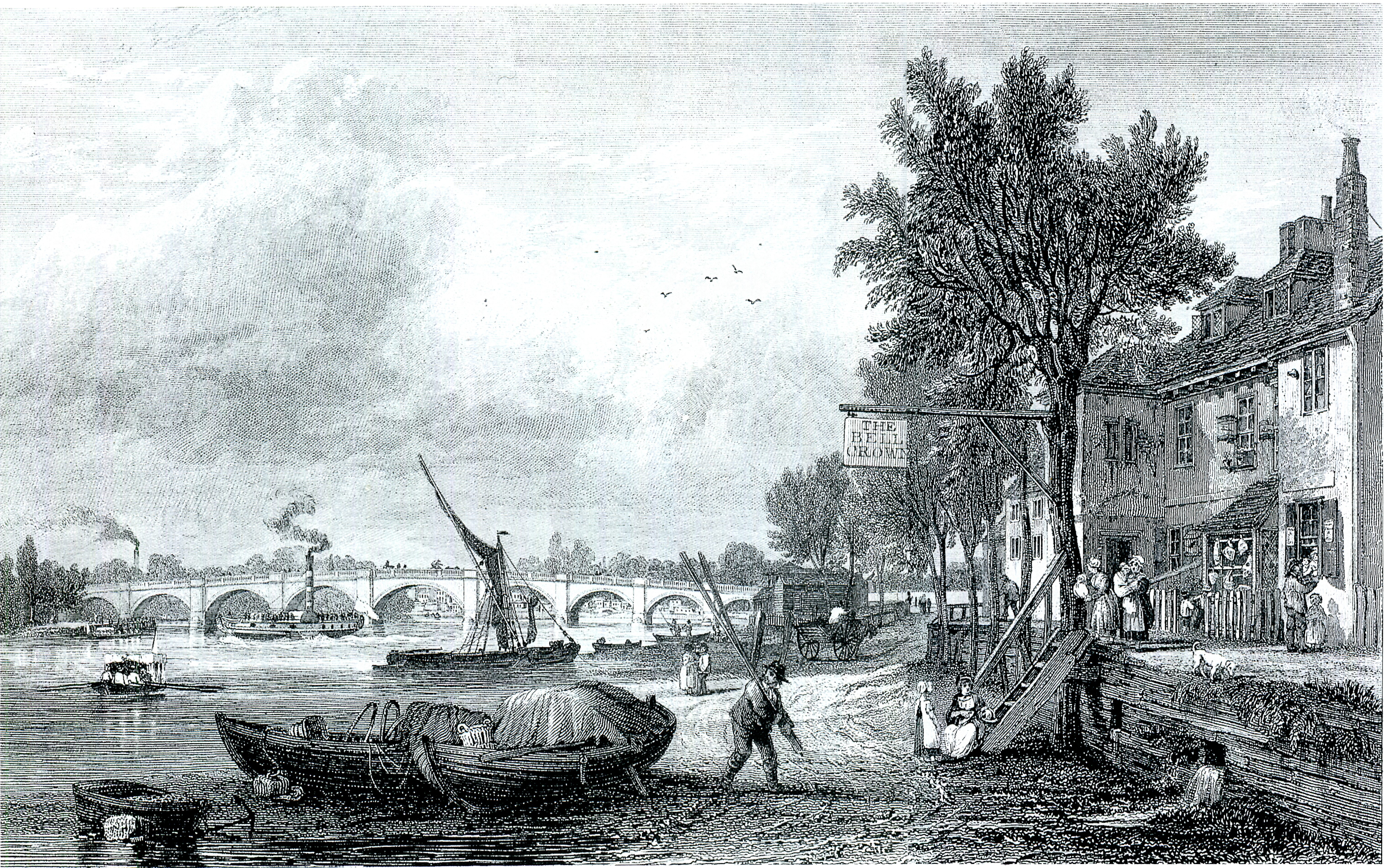
Engraving of Kew Bridge and Strand-on-the-Green by the Bell & Crown Inn, 1832

Over 100 human skulls, now lost, were found in the river at Strand-on-the-Green during the 19th century. Similar river skulls have been dated to around 600 BC, while ancient Roman pottery has been found in the area. The area is first named "Stronde" in 1353 (probably meaning "shore"), at which time it was a fishing village. In 1593 it was named "Strand Green"; the name had become "Strand under Green" on John Rocque's 1746 map. Gradually, other river businesses set up alongside the fishermen. According to the Chiswick and Brentford Local History Society:

the watermen's steps and landing stages of the gentry were cheek by jowl with the wharves built for trade by brick-makers, coal and stone merchants, maltsters, market gardeners, nurserymen, boat-builders, engineers and inn-keepers, and for the up-river depot of the water-Bailiff of the City of London.

=== Modern era ===
Strand-on-the-Green is one of modern Chiswick's four medieval villages. The other three are Old Chiswick, the area around St Nicholas Church; Little Sutton; and Turnham Green. The area grew in popularity when in 1759 Kew Bridge opened, displacing the ferry that had run there for centuries. The presence of the royal family at Kew Palace further helped to make the area fashionable, encouraging the wealthy to build fine houses locally, and bringing industries such as barge-building, boat repair, malt-houses, and wharves for loading and unloading river boats.

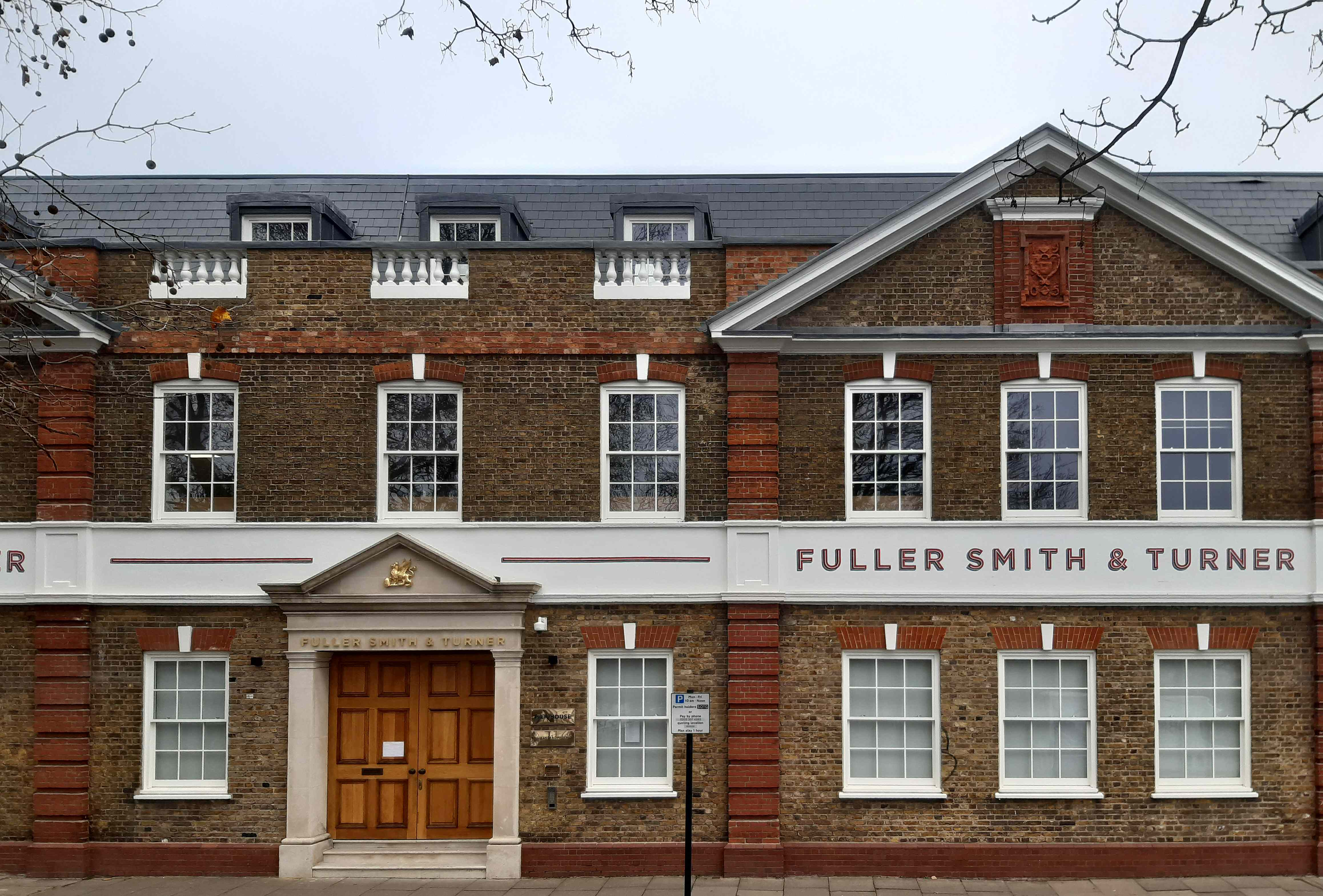
Offices of Fuller, Smith & Turner in Pier House, formerly a large laundry

Pier House Laundry, occupying much of the western end of Thames Road (between Spring Grove and Hearne Road) was built by 1860, becoming one of London's largest laundries; it closed in 1973. In 2016, a fire badly damaged offices in the building. After Fuller, Smith & Turner sold Chiswick's Griffin Brewery in 2019, they moved their registered office to the refurbished building.

The diversion of freight traffic to Brentford by the Grand Junction Canal at the start of the 19th century caused Strand-on-the-Green to decline, a process accelerated by the move of the royal family from Kew Palace to Windsor Castle. In the 20th century, Strand-on-the-Green returned to residential use, and by 1932 was called "London's last remaining village".

In the Second World War, a parachute mine destroyed 41 houses in Thames Road and Magnolia Road, and badly damaged another 60 on 21 September 1941.

=== In film ===
The 1938 television version of The Constant Nymph is partly set on Strand-on-the-Green, backed by a still image of the river. A 1940 Pathé film documented the riverside pubs, Georgian houses and the river traffic of Strand-on-the-Green at that time; it asserted that at one time, "salmon teemed in the Thames, and London got most of it from Strand-on-the-Green". Scenes from the Beatles' 1965 film Help! were shot in the City Barge pub and around Strand-on-the-Green. Part of the 1969 romantic musical Goodbye, Mr. Chips was filmed at Strand-on-the-Green.

== Oliver's Island ==
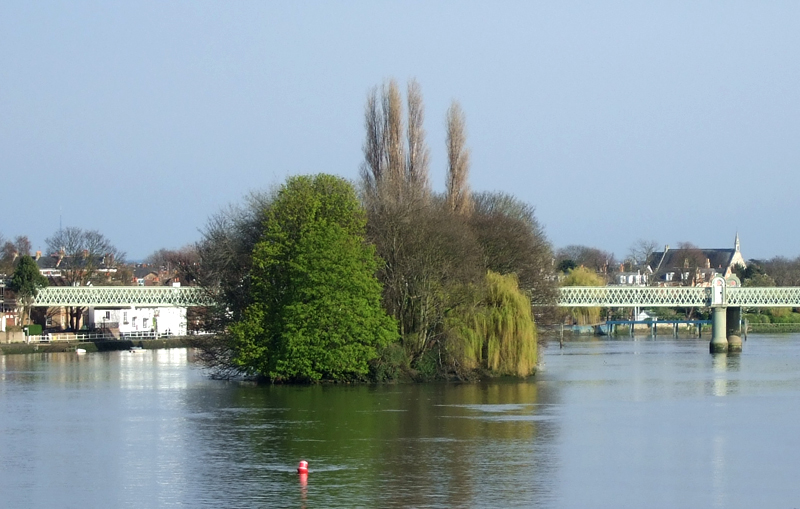
The wooded Oliver's Island on the River Thames looking downstream, with Strand-on-the-Green on the left

Off Strand-on-the-Green in the River Thames is Oliver's Island, a small wooded eyot. It acquired its name from unsubstantiated rumours that Oliver Cromwell used the island as a hideout and held military councils at the Bull's Head pub during the English Civil War. The City of London's Navigation Committee erected buildings on the island after 1777, and barges were stationed here to collect tolls.

== Architecture ==
The Strand-on-the-Green conservation area, established in 2018, consists of three "character areas", namely the Strand, the pedestrianised riverside street and its grand houses, including 25 listed buildings; an area of small streets behind the Strand at the western side near Kew Bridge, with many "positive contributors" but no listed buildings; and an area of streets at the eastern end, mainly of "positive contributors" but also 8 listed buildings on Grove Park Terrace.

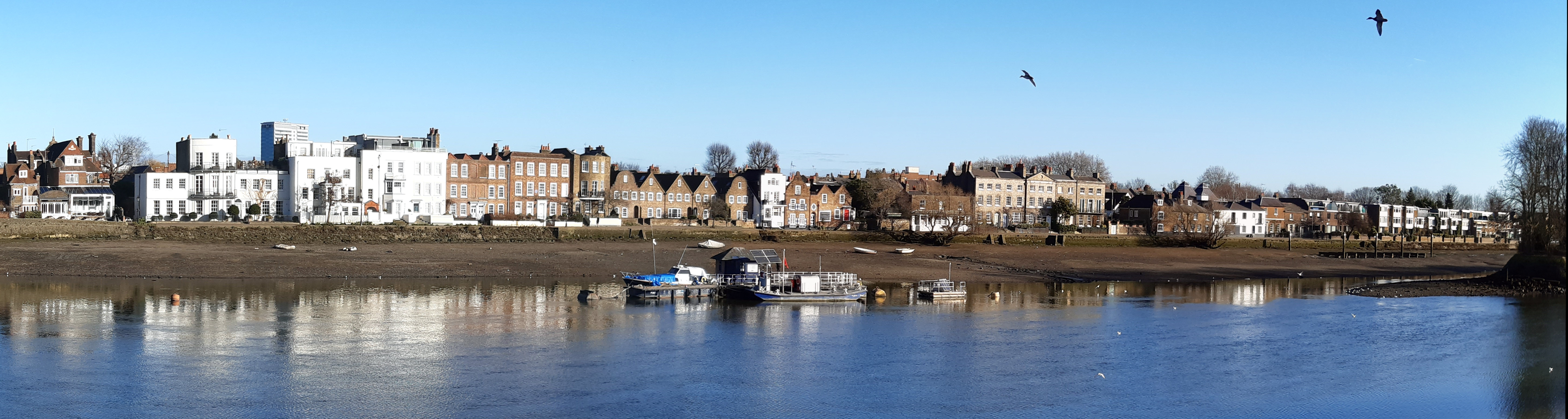
Strand-on-the-Green panorama above Oliver's Island. The Bell and Crown pub is on the left.

The Strand itself is some 500 metres of houses, forming terraces in varied styles and heights, fronting the riverside walk. The backs of the houses face Thames Road, the many small outbuildings of differing ages giving it "an interesting and varied character."

Important buildings in the group begin with the "picturesque" no. 75, a pre-Georgian building, and its next door neighbour, The Bell and Crown. The current Arts and Crafts style pub building dates to 1907.

No. 71, Prospect House is a large three-storied late 18th century building with a bay window and curved balcony on iron columns.

No. 65, Zoffany House, is Grade II* listed as one of the finest buildings in the area; it was built c. 1704. It is a three-storey house of brown brick with red dressings; it has five double-hung sash windows surrounded by architraves; these have rubbed flat arches. The main doorway is flanked by fluted Roman Doric pilasters, painted white. Above the door, according to the Historic England listing, is "an entablature with triglyphs and guttae to architrave and frieze", with a fanlight window. Standing on top of the entablature is a terracotta lion. In front of the house are railings and gate of wrought iron. Inside the house, the ground floor rooms have wooden panelling from the 18th century. The house is marked with a blue plaque; it states that the 18th century portrait painter Johann Zoffany lived there at the end of his life. From 1936, the architect Philip D. Hepworth lived in Zoffany House, carefully restoring it and rebuilding the whole of its front.

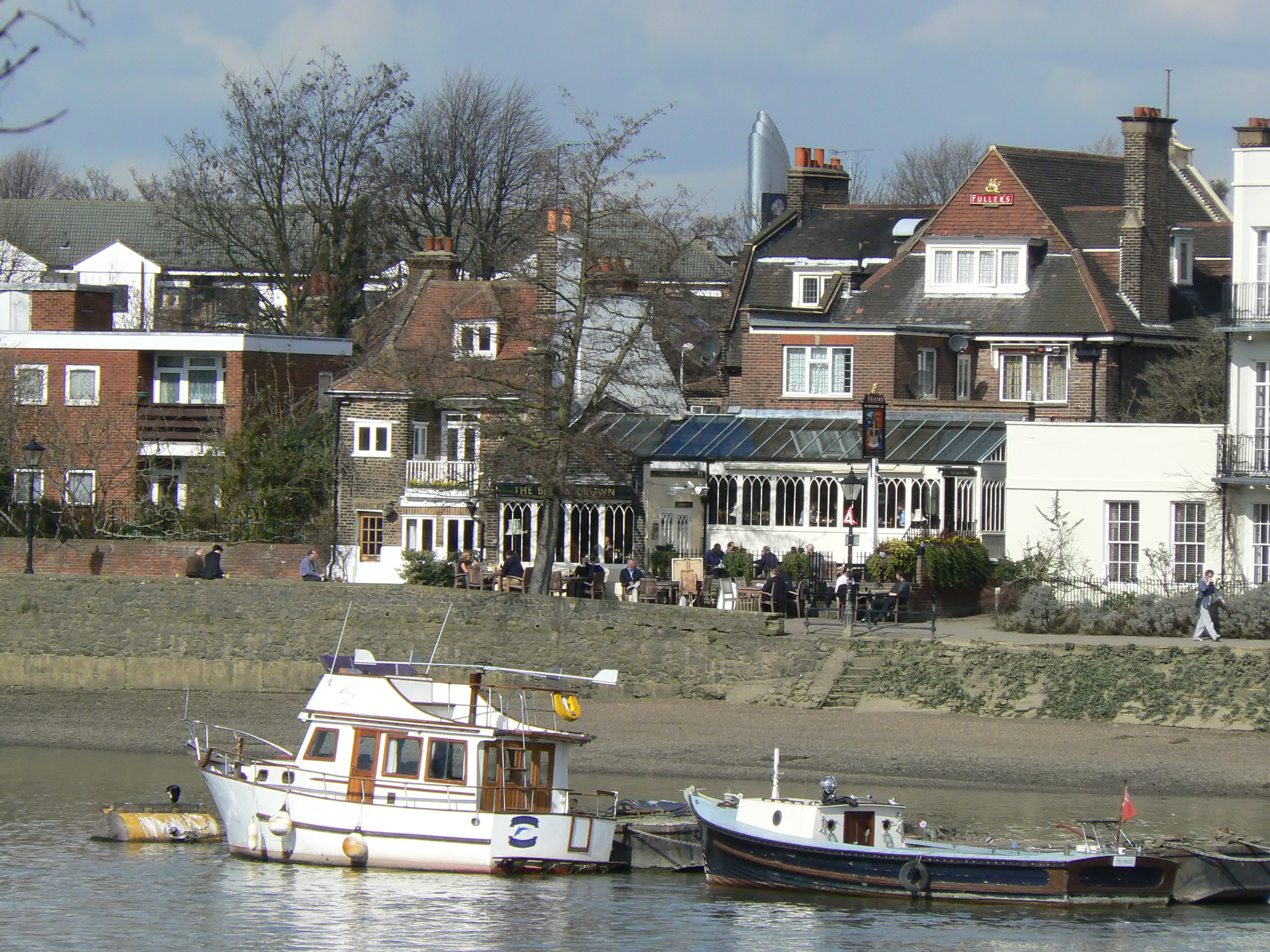
The Bell & Crown

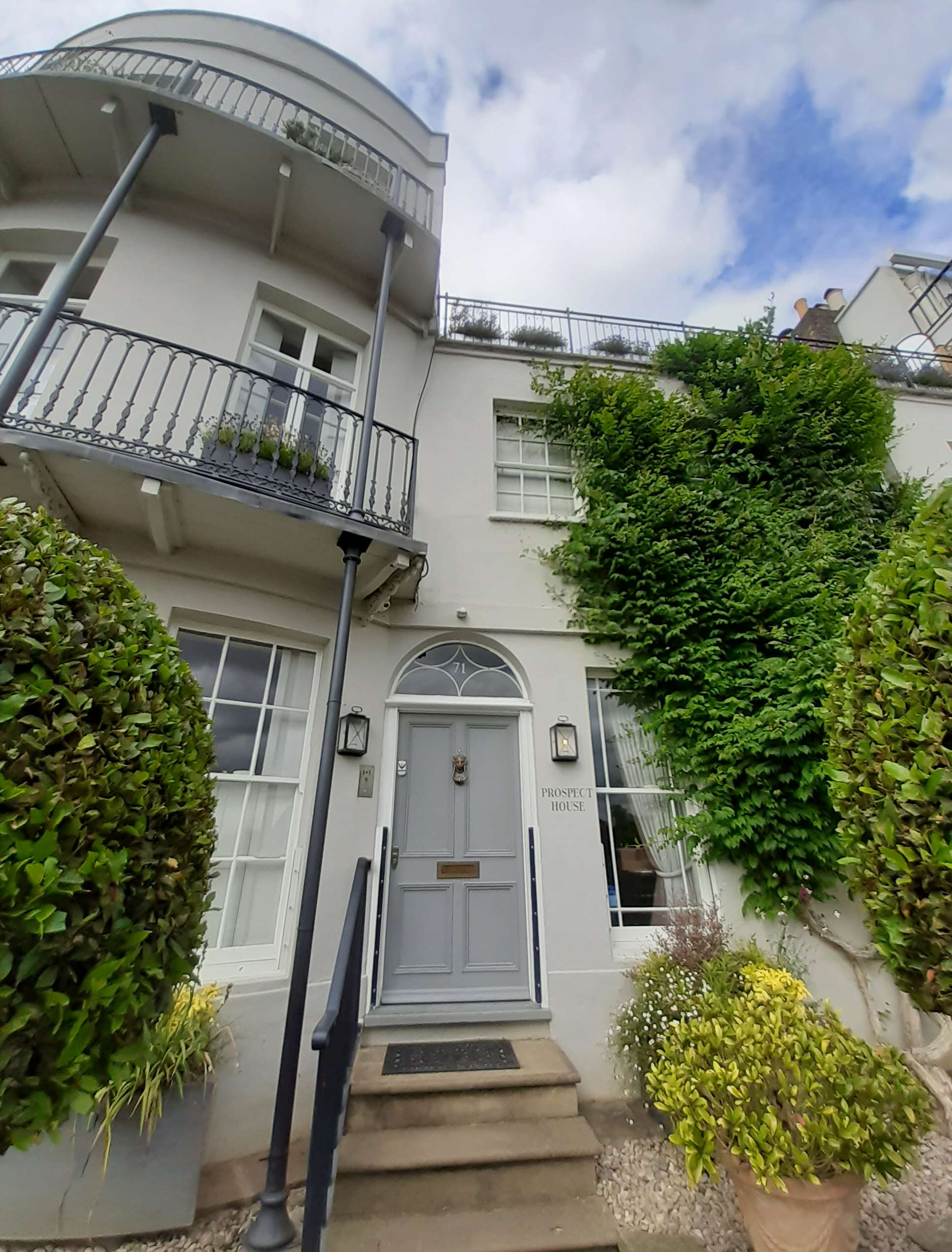
Prospect House

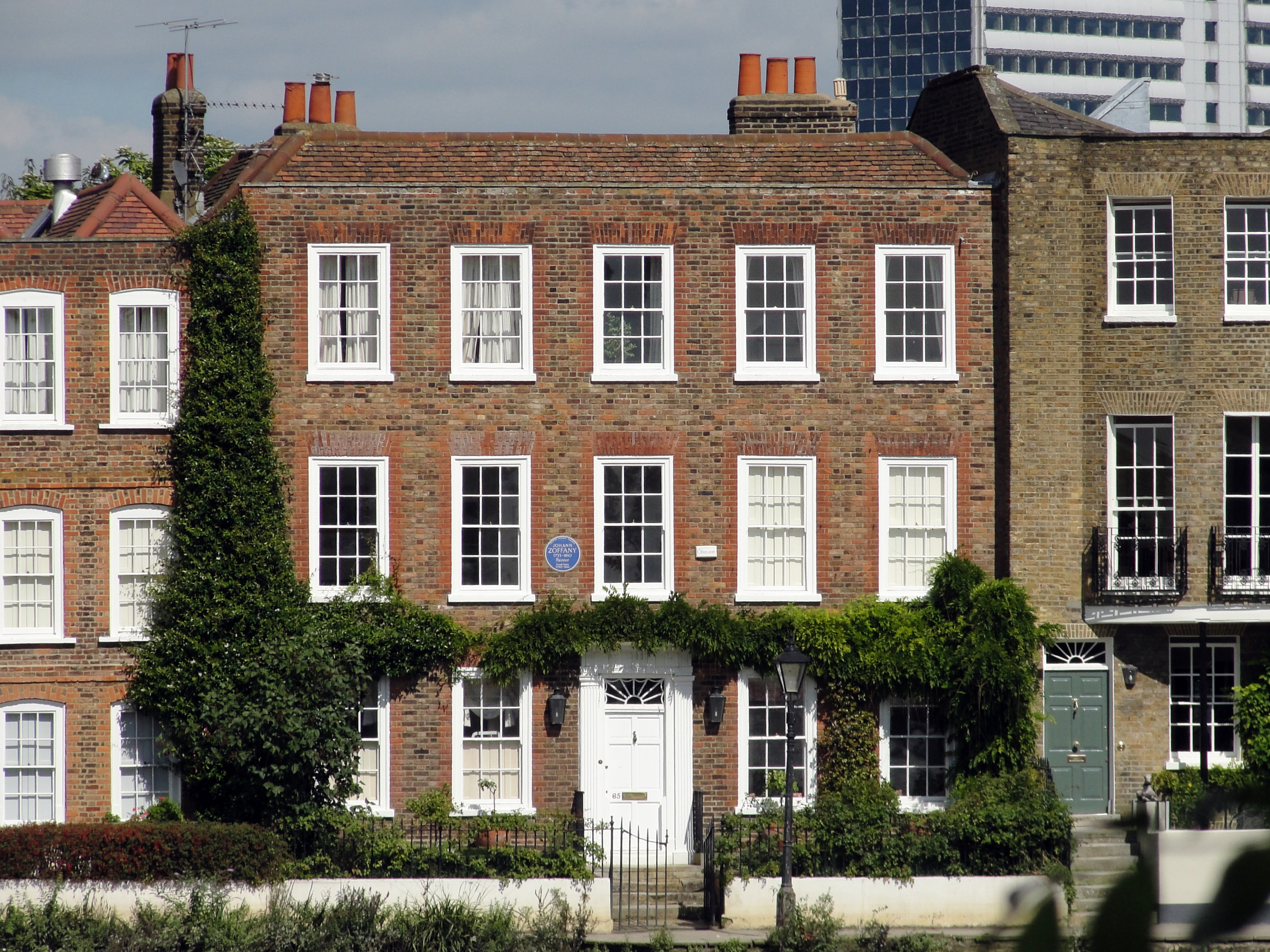
Zoffany house

Just to the east is the 18th or early 19th century Magnolia House (Grade II). It is a three-storey brown brick building with a parapet and double-hung sash windows, housed in flat-arched reveals. The house is distinctive in having the first and second floors with a bow front, supported by two round cast-iron columns; in the centre of this on the first floor is a French window. The windows in the bow have "good cast iron balconettes". The main door has six panels and a rectangular fan window above.

Next are The Moorings, five houses from 1930, built for the "Cottage Craftsmen"; the 18th century Compass House (Grade II); Dutch House with its gable front; the former "The Ship", a pub throughout the 19th century (Grade II); and an "impressive" terrace of 5 three-story Georgian houses at nos 52 to 55 (Grade II). There follow The Malthouse, nos 49 and 50 (early 19th century, Grade II); no. 44, Navigator's Cottage and no. 45, Picton House (two-storey 18th century houses, Grade II).

The City Barge pub opened in the 15th century, though only some of the lower part survived the World War II bombing. A 1940 land mine destroyed much of the pub and the two small cottages that were next to it, where the pub's bar now stands.

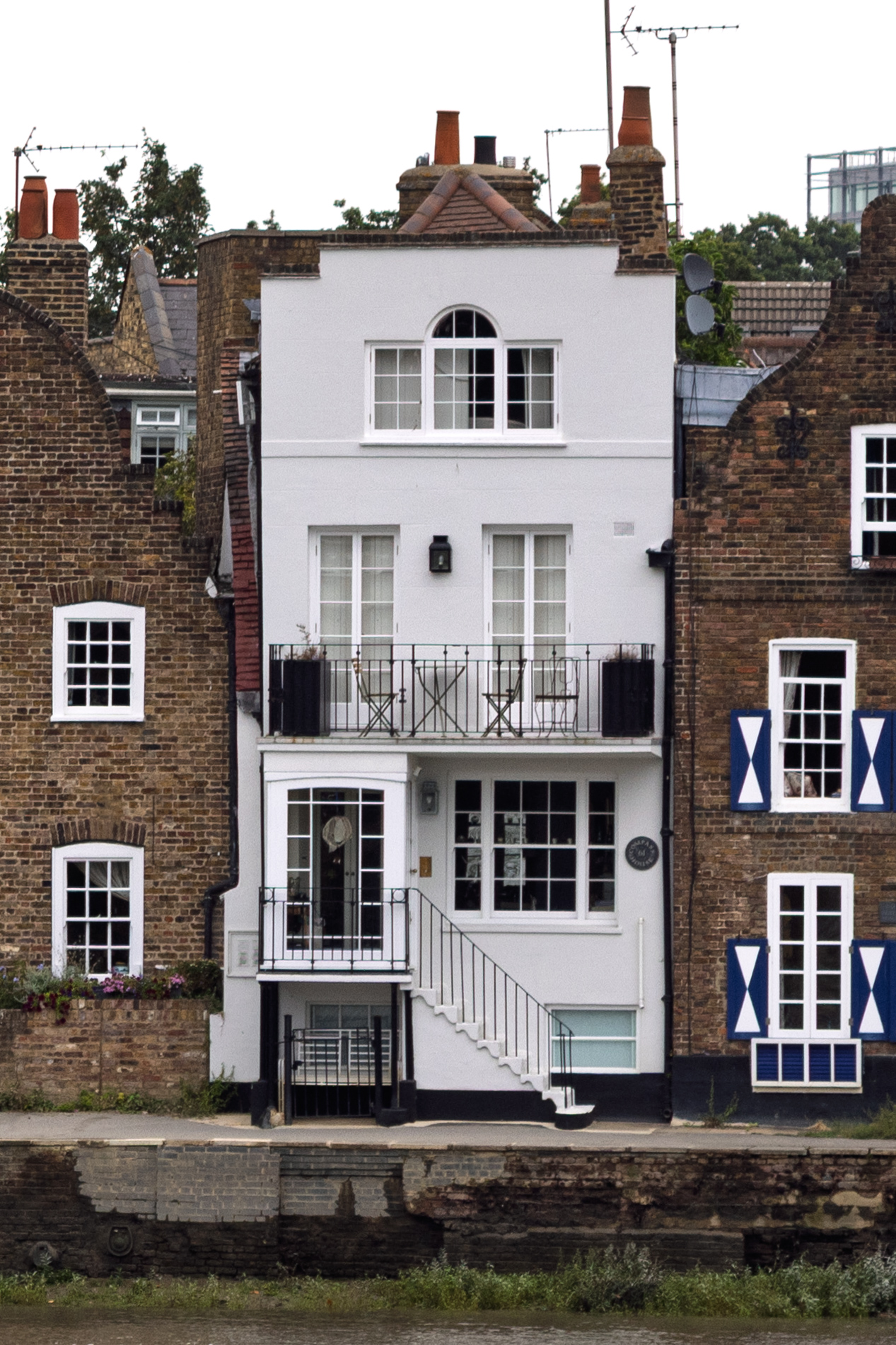
Compass House

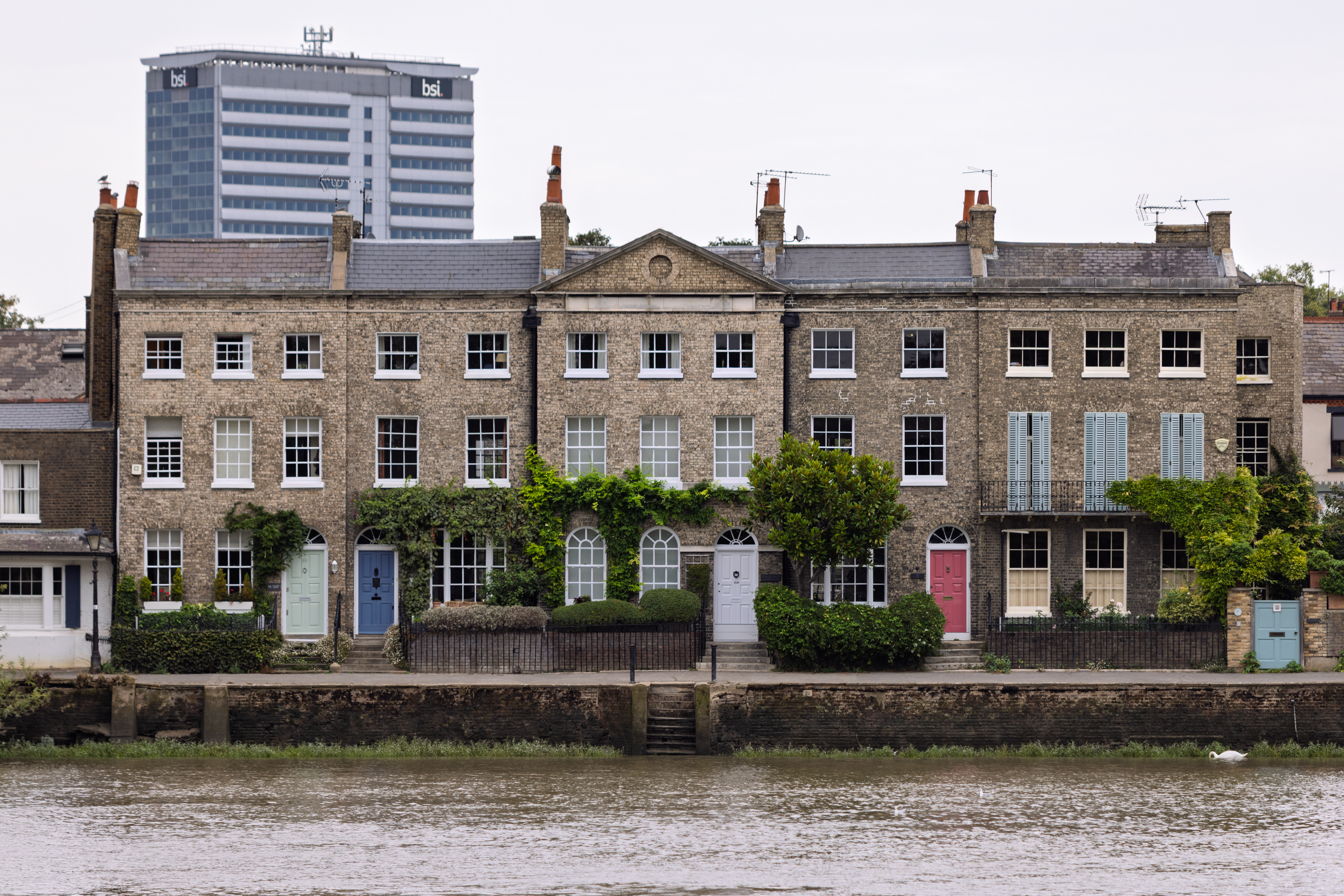
52–55 Strand-on-the-Green

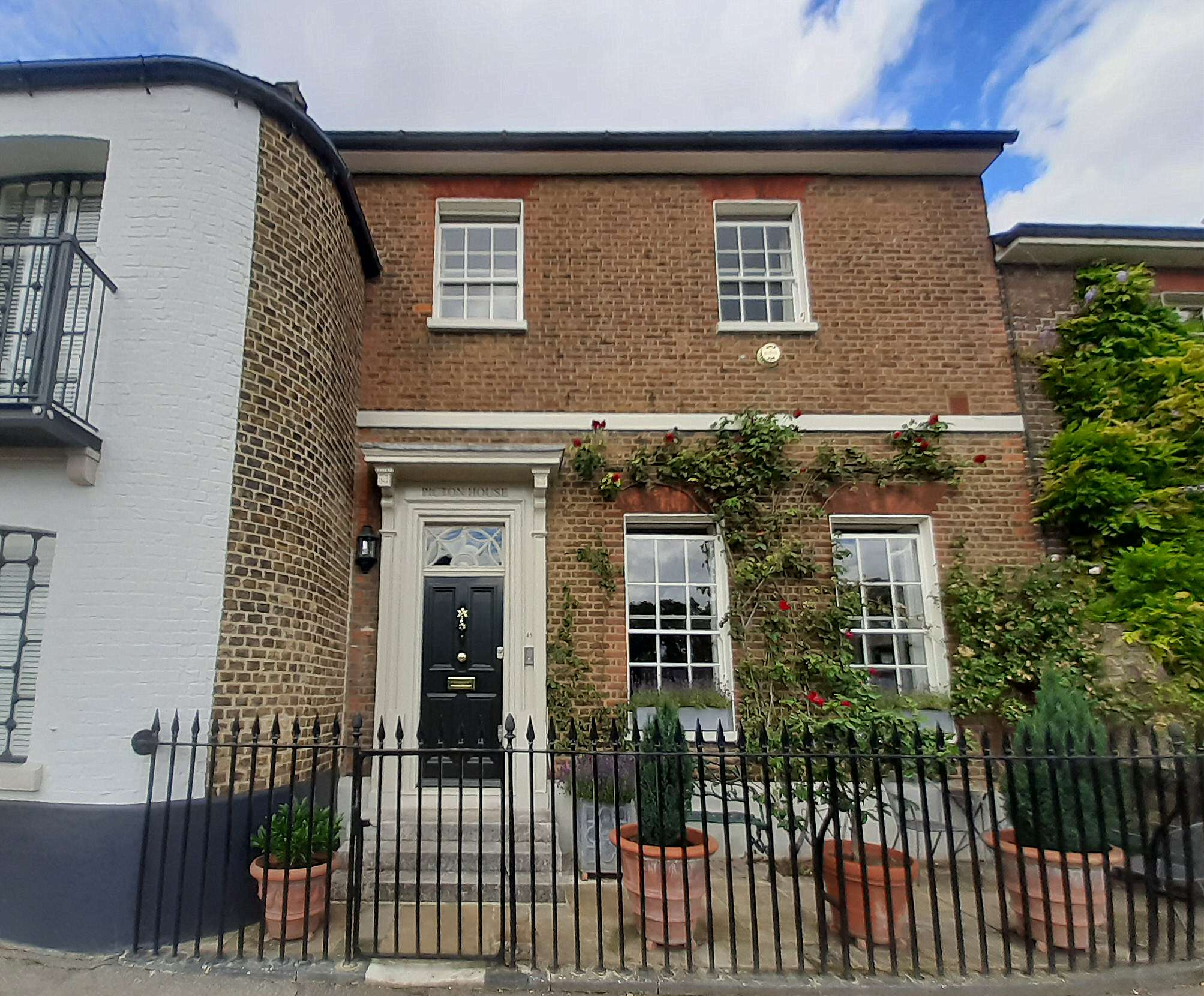
Picton House

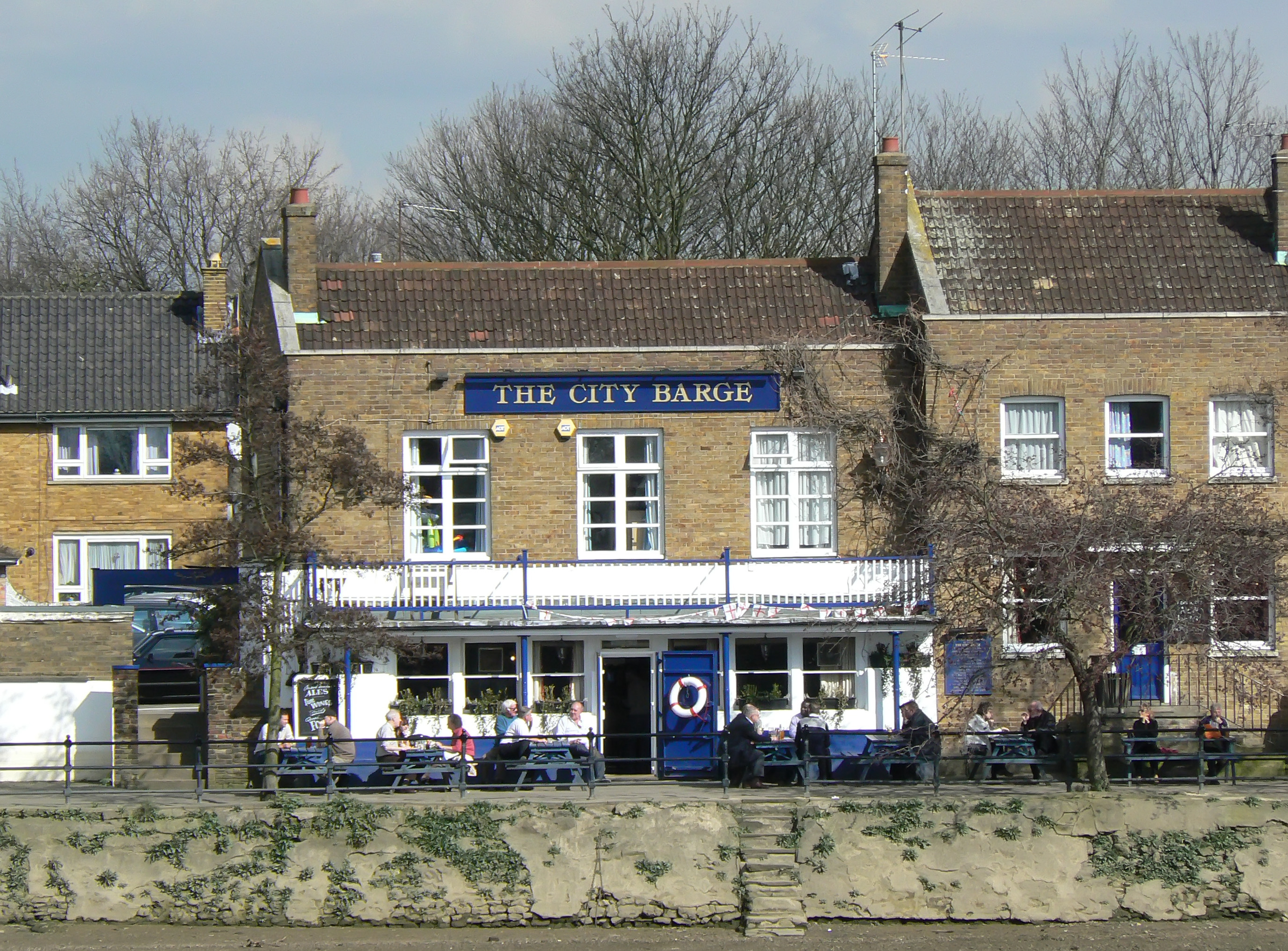
The City Barge

Kew Railway Bridge is a latticed wrought iron girder bridge on pairs of cast iron piers; it has five spans each of 35 metres. It was designed by W. R. Galbraith. It was built by Brassey & Ogilvie for the London and South Western Railway. It opened to rail traffic in 1869, and is Grade II listed. It is used both by the London Overground North London Line and by the London Underground District Line. Under the bridge abutment is the Strand on the Green Sailing Club, its sailing dinghies being stored and maintained there. The club was founded in 1946, and has rented the space under the bridge since 1964.

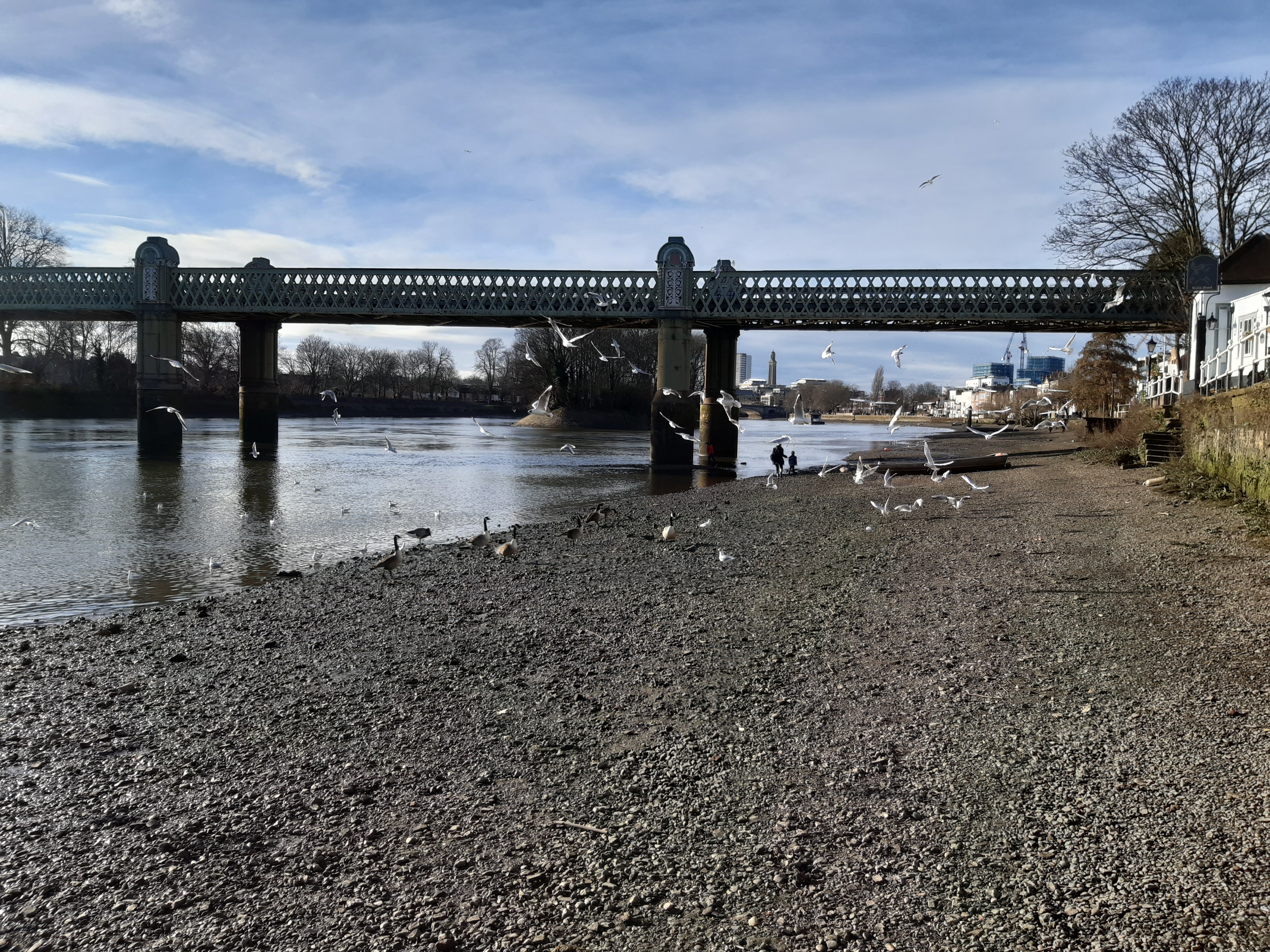
Kew Railway Bridge (Grade II listed), looking West along Strand-on-the-Green

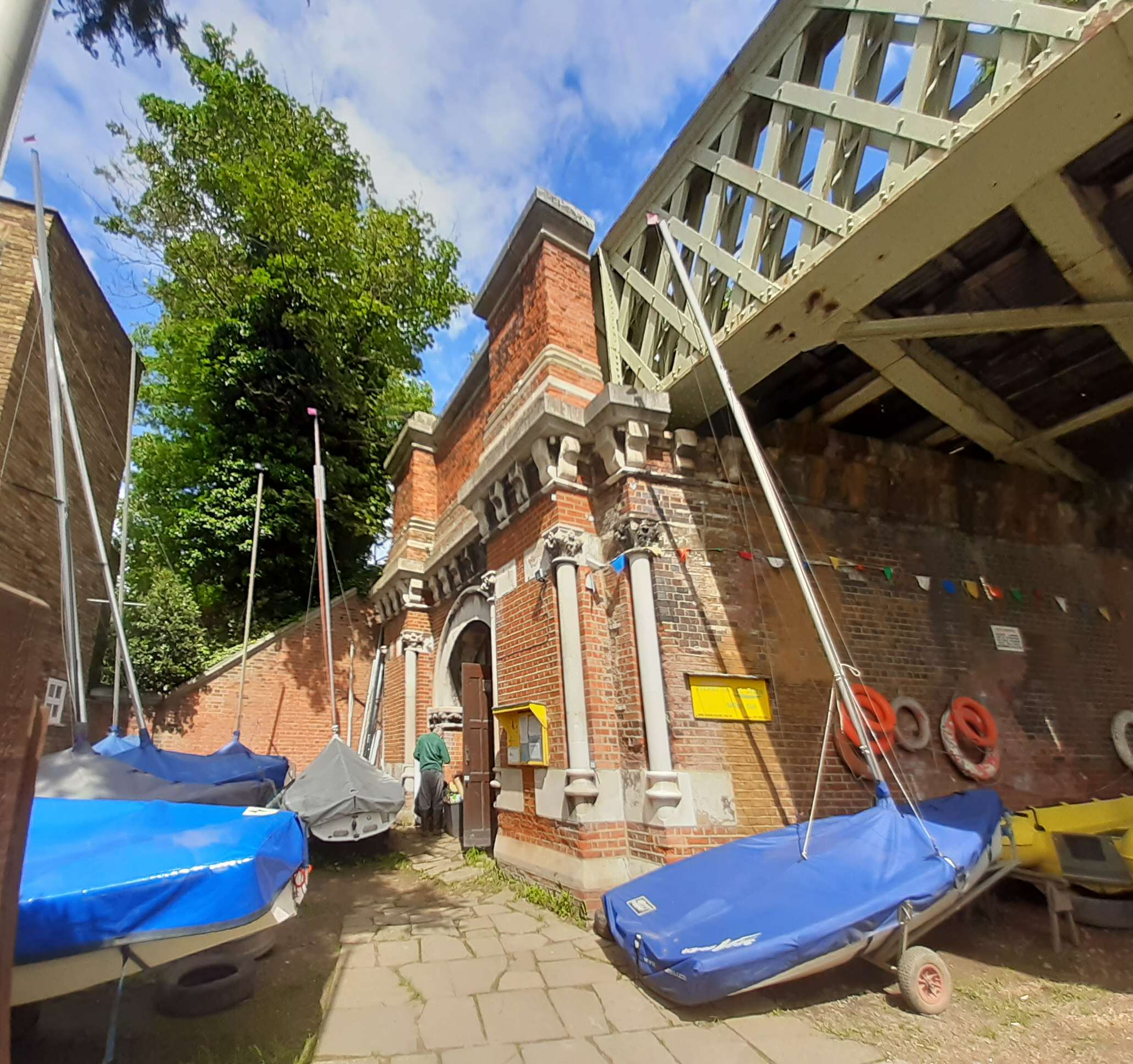
Sailing Club under the ornate Kew Railway Bridge abutment

The Bull's Head pub (Grade II listed in 1970) is 18th century with later additions. It is a two-storey white-painted brick building, and still has its pantile roof with two dormer windows. The entrance has a moulded doorhood resting on brackets. It is flanked by nos 10 to 14, Bull Cottages, also 18th century; they suffered flood damage from high tides, and were restored in 1967. The actor Donald Pleasence lived in the house at the end of the Bull's Head buildings, marked by a Blue Plaque.

The Almshouses form a terrace running back from the river along an alley, Grove Row. They are described as "an attractive feature ... of a modest scale and pleasingly detailed with tall chimneys". The almshouses were built in 1724 by Thomas Child as six small one-roomed houses for the poor. They were refurbished as the "Hopkin Morris Homes of Rest" in 1933, creating three two-roomed houses. The 1933 and 1724 foundation stones survive on the end wall facing the river.

The last house of the terrace facing the river is Strand on the Green House (18th century, Grade II) at the eastern end of the riverside walk. To its east is a Victorian era drinking fountain in red granite, and a short riverside footpath beside the start of Grove Park Road.

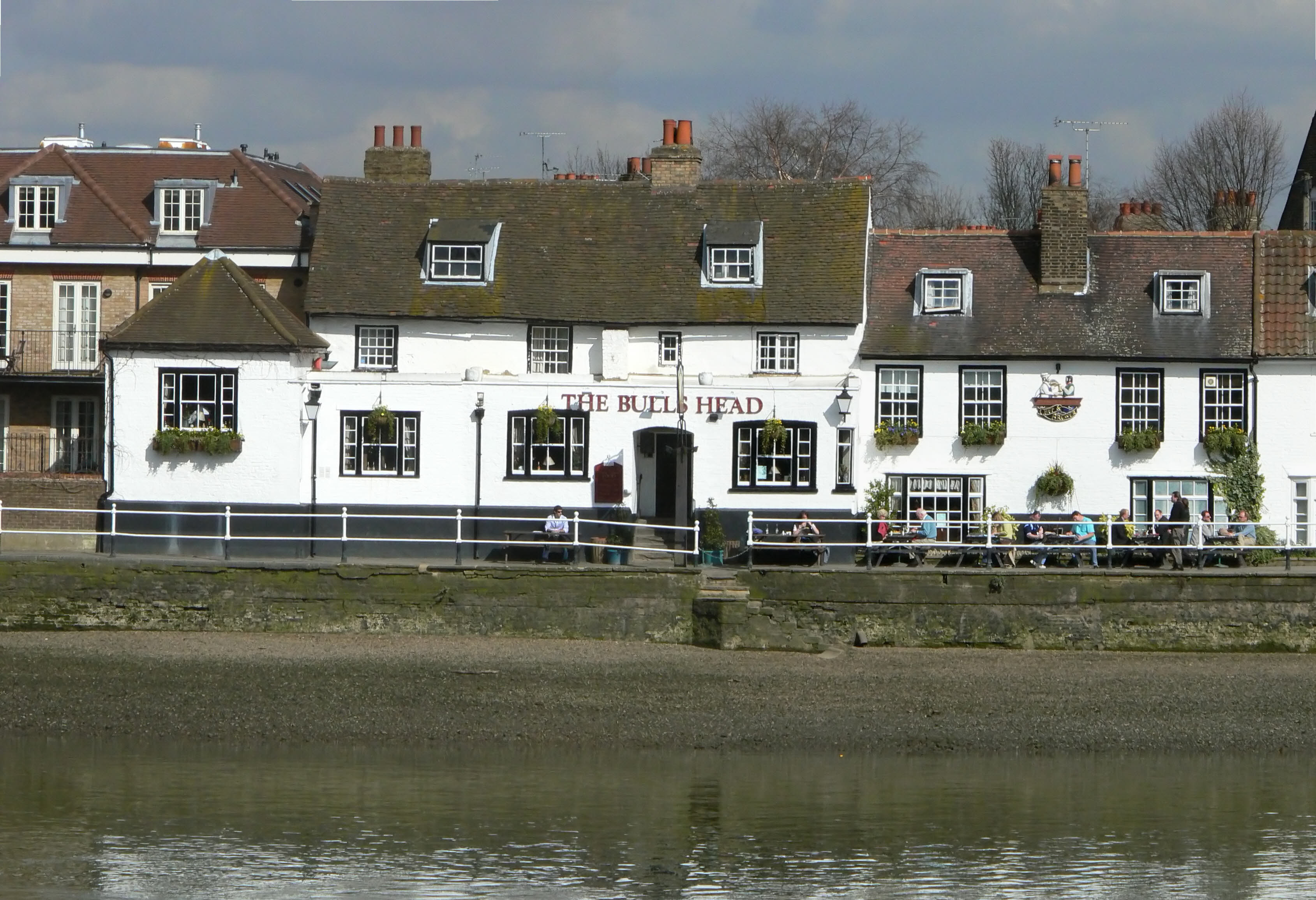
The 18th century Bull's Head pub

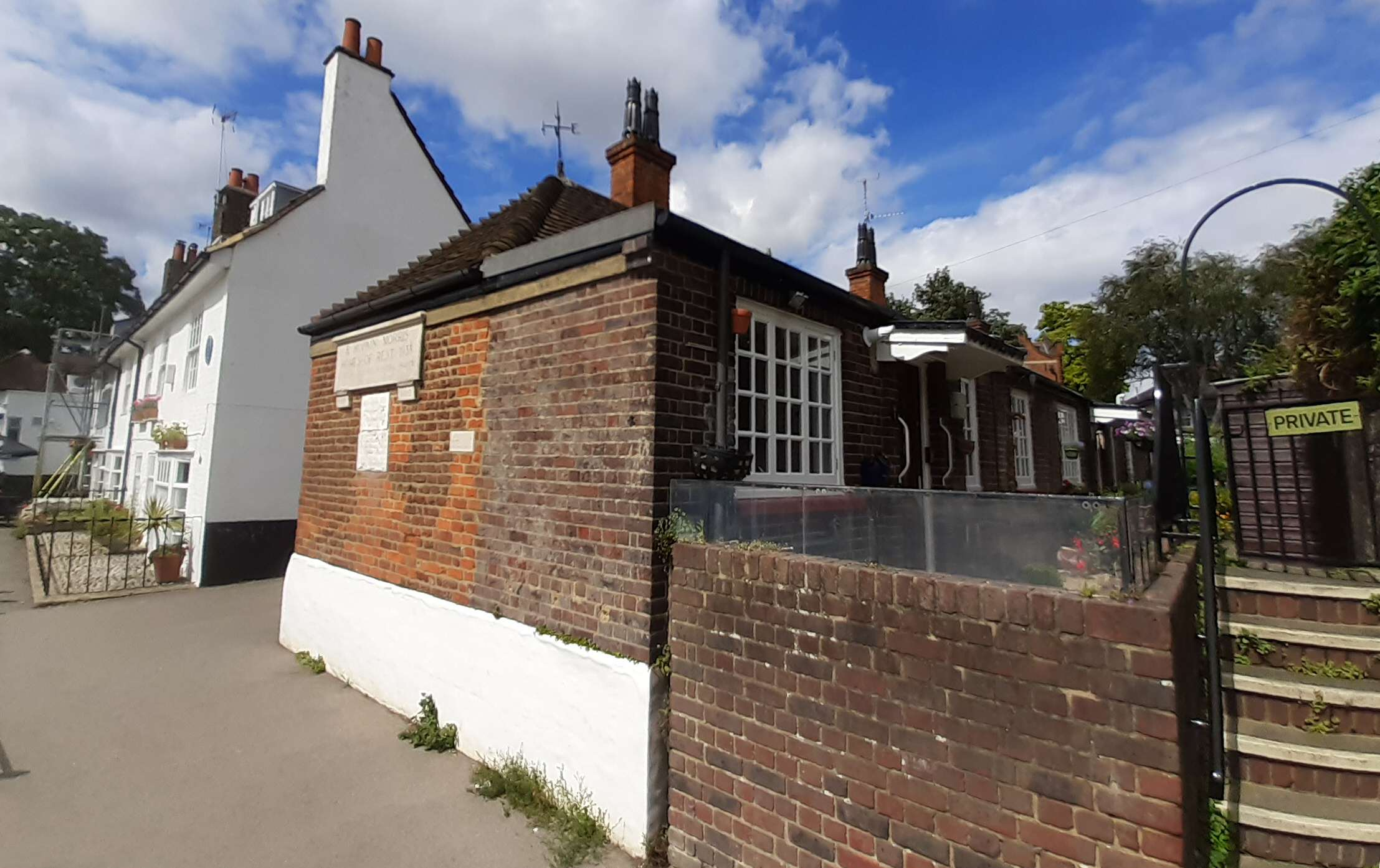
The Almshouses, built in 1724

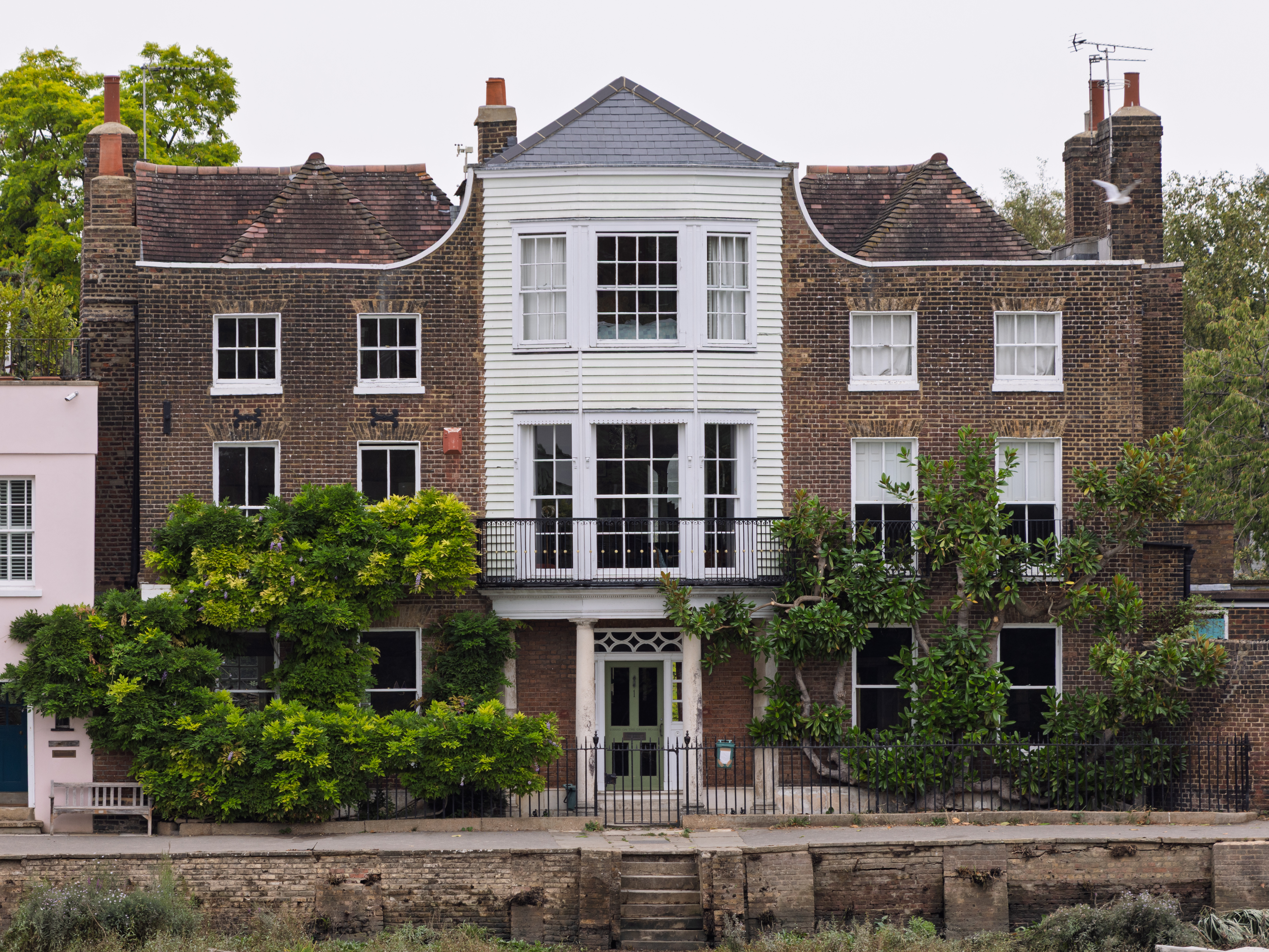
Strand on the Green House

== Notable residents ==
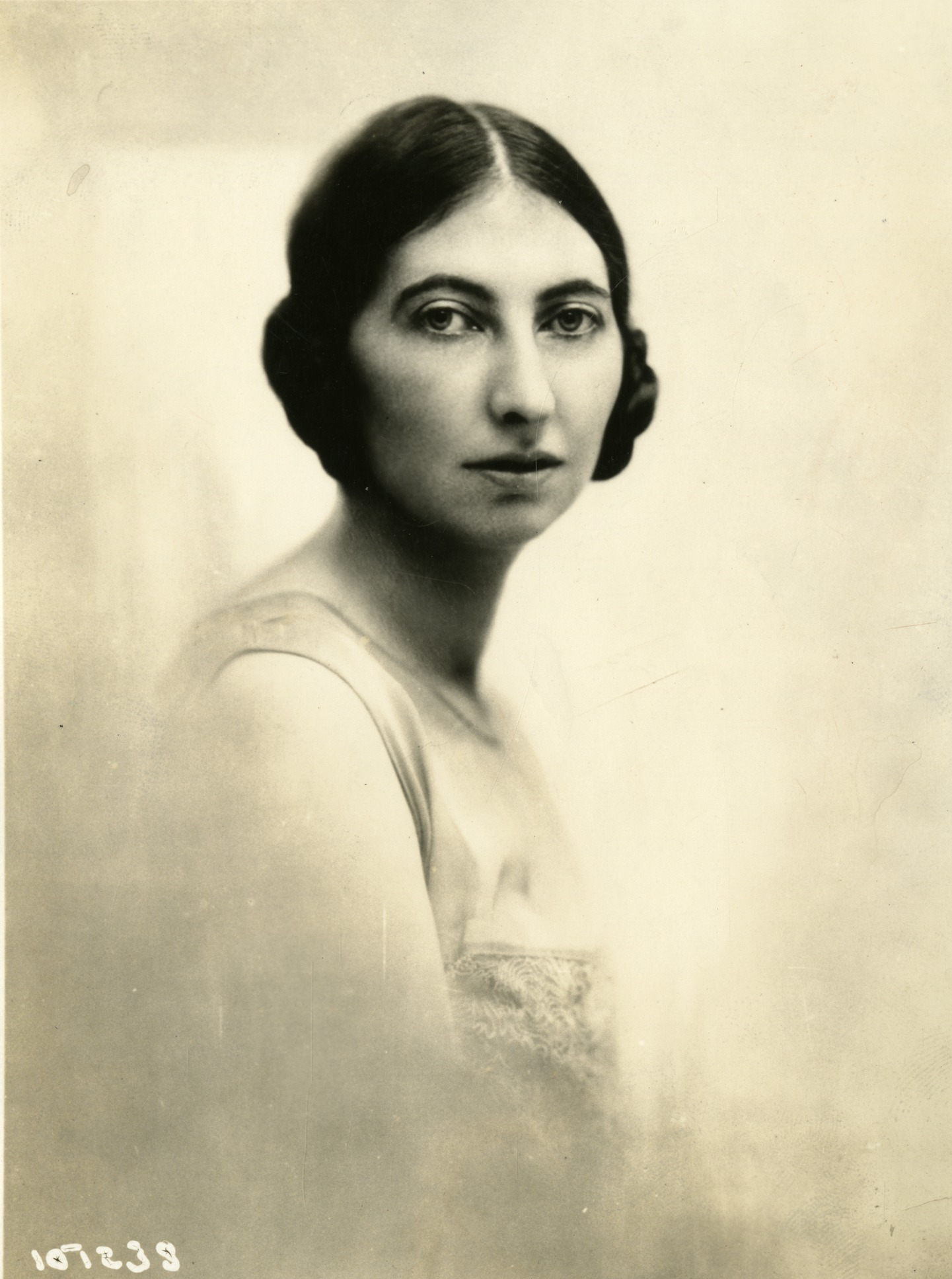
Margaret Kennedy lived in Strand-on-the-Green, and set her 1924 novel The Constant Nymph there.

Strand-on-the-Green has been home to a variety of distinguished people over the centuries, including the Earl of Grantham, who purchased Grove House in 1745, the actress Eileen Atkins, the actor Donald Pleasence and the novelist Margaret Kennedy, who set her bestselling 1924 work The Constant Nymph there. The author Nancy Mitford wrote the 1945 novel The Pursuit of Love when she lived in Rose Cottage. The film director John Guillermin lived at No. 60 (The Dutch House). The newspaper publisher Sir Hugh Cudlipp, and the botanist and explorer of Australia Allan Cunningham have both lived at No. 21. The painter and gallerist Joshua Compston lived at No. 75. Johan Zoffany RA (1733–1810), a German neoclassical painter, lived (and died) at no. 65.

== See also ==
- Chiswick High Road – the relocated commercial centre of Chiswick
- Chiswick Mall – another historic riverside street in Chiswick
