= Oliver's Island =

Island in the River Thames

Coordinates: 51°29′06″N 00°16′52″W

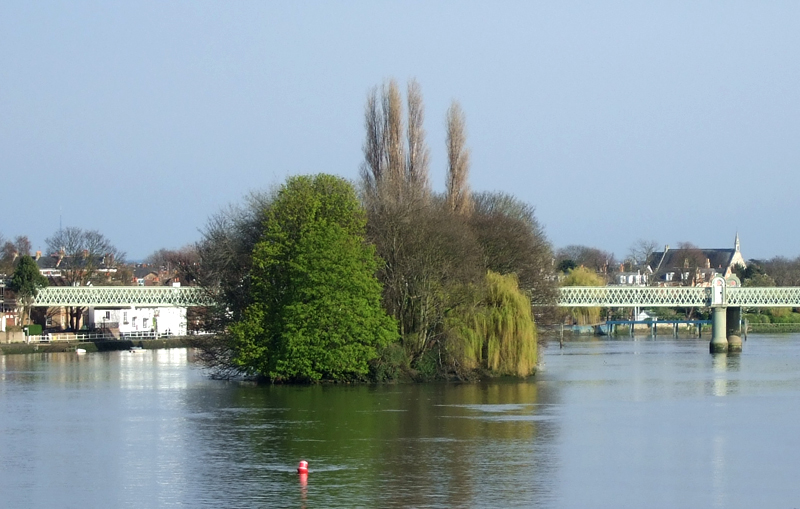
Oliver's Island on the River Thames in London, looking downstream

Oliver's Island is a tree-covered 0.9-acre (0.36 ha) ait (river island), in the River Thames in England. It is in the London Borough of Hounslow, on the Tideway, facing Kew and Strand-on-the-Green in the London Borough of Richmond upon Thames, and is owned by the Port of London Authority.

== Description ==
The thickly-wooded islet is a haven for herons, cormorants and Canada geese. It is mid-stream equidistant from Priory Park Allotments, Kew and Strand-on-the-Green, Chiswick.

== Etymology and alternate name ==
The islet derives its name from a story that Oliver Cromwell once took refuge on it, but there is almost certainly no truth in this story. It was called Strand Ayt until a century after the English Civil War, by which time a myth had arisen that Cromwell had set up an intermittent headquarters at the Bull's Head, Strand-on-the-Green. The story was embellished with the suggestion that a secret tunnel connected the island to the inn, but no evidence of any tunnel has ever been found.

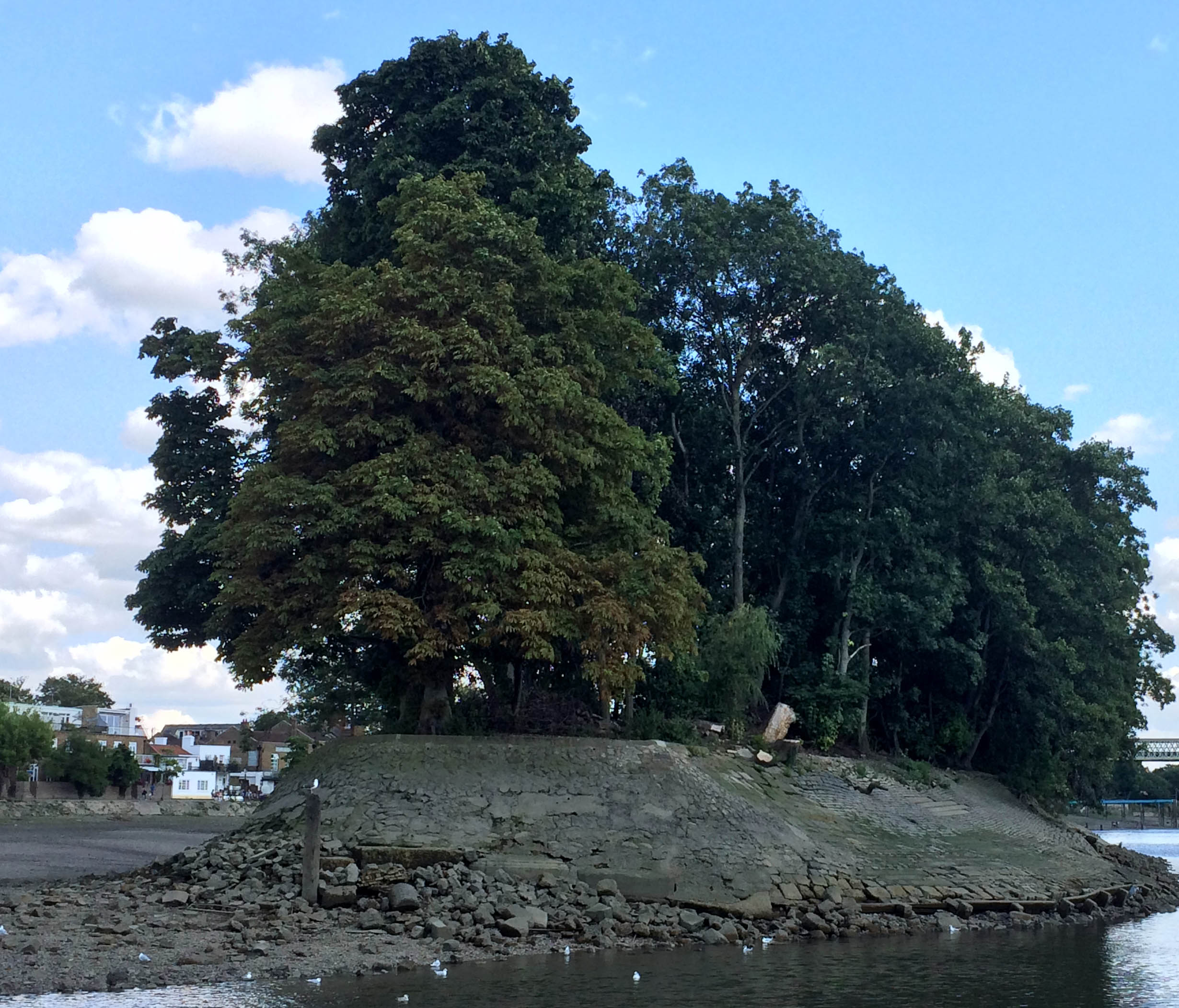
Oliver's Island at low tide in a dry summer; the far channel is dry

== History ==
In 1777 the City of London's navigation committee installed a tollbooth on the islet to levy charges on passing craft to fund improvements to the river's navigability. This was a wooden structure in the shape of a small castle, and a barge was moored alongside, from which the tolls were taken. The "City Barge" gave its name to the inn at Strand-on-the-Green. Successor barges were often stationed here to collect tolls until a dock was built on the Surrey (south) shore. A smithy was on the island by 1865 and it became a place where barges were built and repaired, the Thames Conservancy Works spanning its north shore and the facing the north shore; in 1857 the Thames Conservancy took over the above-mentioned roles of the City of London and in 1909 assigned the islet to the Port of London Authority (PLA), which used its small building as a storage depot and all its shores as a wharf, with crane, for derelict vessels. When the PLA tried to sell the island in 1971, the Strand on the Green Association, an amenity society formed by residents for their locality, led the protests. The plan was quickly dropped. The smithy was demolished in 1990.

== See also ==
- Islands in the River Thames

== Sources ==
- Thacker, Fred S (1968). The Thames Highway. New York: A. M. Kelley. OCLC 443588.

Next island upstream	River Thames	Next island downstream
Brentford Ait	Oliver's Island	Chiswick Eyot
