= Bull's Head, Strand-on-the-Green =

Pub in Chiswick, London

Coordinates: 51°29′3.8″N 0°16′41.4″W

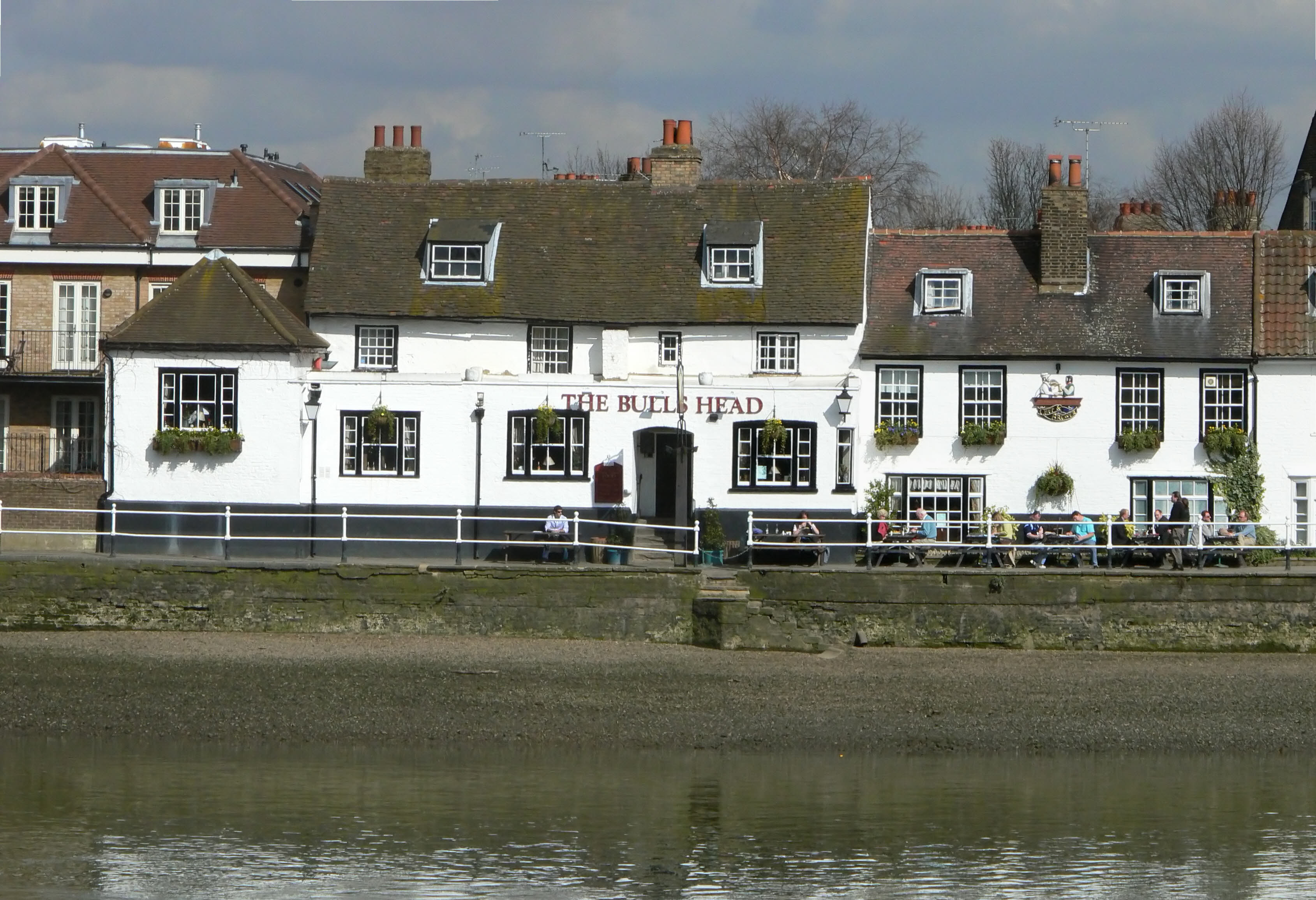
The Bull's Head

The Bull's Head is a Grade II listed public house at 15 Strand-on-the-Green, Chiswick, London, England. The building (Grade II listed in 1970) is 18th century with later additions; the architect is not known. It is a two-storey white-painted brick building, and still has its pantile roof with two dormer windows. The entrance has a moulded doorhood resting on brackets. Inside, the pub's bar and drinking area consists of numerous rooms on different levels; the lowest room is the "Duck & Grouse" restaurant.

It is adjoined by nos 10 to 14, Bull Cottages, also 18th century; they suffered flood damage from high tides, and were restored in 1967. The actor Donald Pleasence lived in the house at the end of the Bull's Head buildings, marked by a blue plaque.

An unlikely legend maintains that Oliver Cromwell stayed in the pub, then escaping to the nearby Oliver's Island and hiding there; there is no reliable evidence for either claim.
