= Leningradsky (inhabited locality) =

Set index of articles associated with the same name

Leningradsky (Russian: Ленингра́дский; masculine), Leningradskaya (Ленингра́дская; feminine), or Leningradskoye (Ленингра́дское; neuter) is the name of several inhabited localities in Russia.

Urban localities

- Leningradsky, Chukotka Autonomous Okrug, an urban-type settlement in Iultinsky District of Chukotka Autonomous Okrug

Rural localities

- Leningradsky, Kemerovo Oblast, a settlement in Beregovaya Rural Territory of Kemerovsky District of Kemerovo Oblast
- Leningradsky, Novosibirsk Oblast, a settlement in Krasnozyorsky District of Novosibirsk Oblast
- Leningradsky, Samara Oblast, a settlement in Alexeyevsky District of Samara Oblast
- Leningradsky, Voronezh Oblast, a settlement in Anokhinskoye Rural Settlement of Talovsky District of Voronezh Oblast
- Leningradskaya (rural locality), a stanitsa in Leningradsky Rural Okrug of Leningradsky District of Krasnodar Krai
