= Leningradsky =

Leningradsky (masculine), Leningradskaya (feminine), or Leningradskoye (neuter) may refer to:

- Leningradsky District, name of several districts and city districts in Russia
- Leningradsky (inhabited locality) (Leningradskaya, Leningradskoye), name of several inhabited localities in Russia
- Leningradsky Avenue, a major avenue in Moscow, Russia
- Leningradsky Rail Terminal the oldest principal railway station in Moscow, Russia
- Leningrad Oblast (Leningradskaya oblast), a federal subject of Russia
- Hilton Moscow Leningradskaya Hotel, a hotel in Moscow, Russia
- Leningradskaya Station, a Soviet Antarctic research station
- Leningradskaya railway station, former name of Streshnevo railway station in Moscow, Russia
- Leningradskoye Highway, a part of M10 federal Moscow St. Petersburg highway, Russia
- Leningradskoye gas field, a natural gas field in Yamalo-Nenets Autonomous Okrug, Russia
