= Leningradsky District =

Leningradsky District (Russian: Ленинградский район) is the name of several administrative and municipal districts in Russia.

== Districts of the federal subjects ==
Location of Krasnodar Krai in Russia

- Leningradsky District, Krasnodar Krai, an administrative and municipal district of Krasnodar Krai

== City divisions ==
- Leningradsky Administrative District, Kaliningrad, an administrative district of the city of Kaliningrad, the administrative center of Kaliningrad Oblast
Location of Kaliningrad in Russia

== See also ==
- Leningradsky (disambiguation)
