= London Borough of Hounslow =

Coordinates: 51°28′3″N 0°21′42″W

- London borough
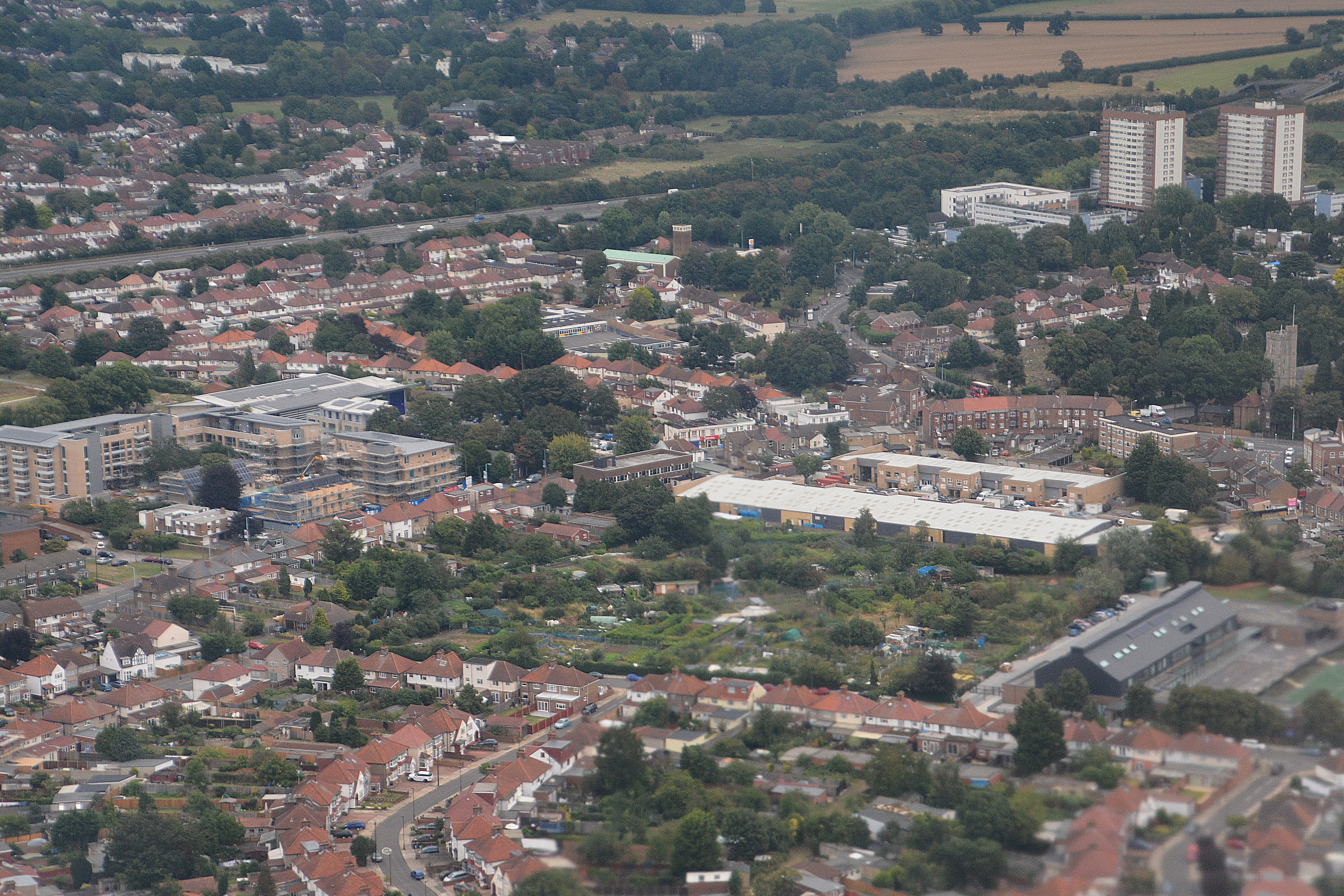
- Hounslow from the air

- Coat of arms Council logo
- Motto(s): Iuncti progrediamur (Let us go forward together)
- Hounslow shown within Greater London
- Sovereign state: United Kingdom
- Constituent country: England
- Region: London
- Ceremonial county: Greater London
- Created: 1 April 1965
- Admin HQ: Hounslow

Government
  - Type: London borough council
  - Body: Hounslow London Borough Council
  - London Assembly: Gareth Roberts AM for South West
  - MPs: Seema Malhotra; Ruth Cadbury; Andy Slaughter

Area
  - Total: 21.61 sq mi (55.98 km^{2})
  - Rank: 237th (of 296)

Population (2025)
  - Total: 299,486
  - Rank: 54th (of 296)
  - Density: 13,860/sq mi (5,350/km^{2})

Ethnicity (2021)
  - Ethnic groups: List: 44.1% White; 36.7% Asian; 7.3% other; 7.2% Black; 4.7% Mixed

Religion (2021)
  - Religion: List: 38.3% Christianity; 18.6% no religion; 16.7% Islam; 9.5% Hinduism; 8.6% Sikhism; 6.1% not stated; 1.4% Buddhism; 0.8% other; 0.2% Judaism
- Time zone: UTC (GMT)
  - Summer (DST): UTC+1 (BST)
- Postcodes: TW, W
- Area code: 020
- ISO 3166 code: GB-HNS
- ONS code: 00AT
- GSS code: E09000018
- Police: Metropolitan Police
- Website: http://www.hounslow.gov.uk/

The London Borough of Hounslow (/ˈhaʊnzloʊ/ HOWNZ-loh) is a London borough in west London, England, forming part of Outer London. It is governed by Hounslow London Borough Council.

The borough stretches from near Central London in the east (Chiswick) to the border with Surrey in the west (Feltham and Bedfont), covering five major towns: Chiswick (W4), Brentford (TW8), Isleworth (TW7), Hounslow (TW3, TW4, TW5) and Feltham (TW13, TW14); it borders the boroughs of Richmond upon Thames, Hammersmith and Fulham, Ealing and Hillingdon, in addition to the Spelthorne district of Surrey.

The borough is home to the London Museum of Water & Steam and the attractions of Osterley Park, Gunnersbury Park, Syon House, and Chiswick House. Landmarks just outside the border of Hounslow include Twickenham Stadium and London Heathrow Airport, in the London Boroughs of Richmond-upon-Thames and Hillingdon, respectively.

== Toponymy ==
The town of Hounslow, which has existed since the 13th century, is located at the centre of the Borough of Hounslow. The name Hounslow means 'Hund's mound'; the personal name Hund is followed by the Old English hlaew meaning mound or barrow. (The mound may have been his burial place.) It was recorded in the Domesday Book as Honeslaw.

== History ==
The borough was created in 1965 under the London Government Act 1963, covering the combined area of the former Municipal Borough of Brentford and Chiswick, the Municipal Borough of Heston and Isleworth and Feltham Urban District. The area was transferred from Middlesex to Greater London to become one of the 32 London Boroughs. The new borough was named Hounslow after the town at the centre of the new borough. The old Heston and Isleworth district had nearly been renamed Hounslow in 1927; a large majority of voters in a referendum had supported the change of name, but it was vetoed by Middlesex County Council.

The borough is an outer borough of Greater London and lies on the north bank of the River Thames. It is the site of the first stop on an important coach route to Southampton, Bath, Bristol and Exeter. The A30 Great South West Road, which runs down to Penzance in Cornwall, starts in the borough. Hounslow town developed on either side of the main Great West Road (now the A3006/A4 Bath Road) from London to the west of England, causing a large number of inns to be built to serve the travellers. A few, such as The Bell retain their names, although the buildings have largely been replaced. The Bell marks the former junction of the coaching routes of the A314 Hanworth Road, A315 Staines Road, A3005 Lampton Road and the A3006 Bath Road. Historic milestones are preserved on the Staines Road (now re-numbered as the A315 but joining the "old" A30 again just inside the borough's western boundary)

Hounslow grew rapidly in the latter half of the 20th century due to other travel, a connection to the largest of London's airports since the 1940s, Heathrow Airport which is in the Hounslow post town but administratively in the London Borough of Hillingdon. Aviation in the area dates to the early 1900s when one of London's earliest airfields was situated on Hounslow Heath because of the extremely flat terrain. The Great West Road, which crosses the borough from Chiswick to Heathrow, at one time served nationally and globally famous manufacturers including Firestone, Gillette and Coty. As a result, the area became known as the "Golden Mile". A few of these factory sites remain today, such as Gillette Corner, and the Great West Road is still home to many prestigious names (see "famous companies" below), providing them with easy non-motorway access between Slough, London Heathrow Airport and Central London.

== Geography ==
=== List of districts in Hounslow ===
Main settlements (head district is located in the borough):

- Chiswick W4 (Turnham Green, Gunnersbury)
- Brentford TW8 (Gunnersbury)
- Isleworth TW7 (Osterley, Spring Grove, Old Isleworth)
- Hounslow TW3, TW4, TW5 (Lampton, Hounslow West, Heston, Cranford, North Hyde)
- Feltham TW13, TW14 (Hanworth, Bedfont)

Although the majority of these towns are situated in the borough, many smaller settlements that comprise them are located in adjacent boroughs. Approximately a third of Chiswick – north of the London Underground (District/Piccadilly line) railway line – falls within the London Borough of Ealing. A few roads in Brentford (around Claypond Hospital) and Isleworth (south of the River Crane and around Whitton) lay within the London Boroughs of Ealing and Richmond upon Thames respectively. A significant minority of Hounslow – south of the railway and southeast of Hounslow Heath – fall within the London Borough of Richmond upon Thames, whilst some of Hounslow – west of the River Crane – falls within the London Borough of Hillingdon. Minor parts of Feltham fall within the Borough of Spelthorne in Surrey, meaning that these parts of the town are situated outside Greater London.

Minor settlements (minor areas partly in the borough):

- Acton W3 (South Acton, Gunnersbury)
- Ealing W5 (South Ealing, Gunnersbury)
- Hammersmith W6 (Stamford Brook)
- Hanwell W7 (Boston Manor)
- Twickenham TW1 (Mogden/Ivybridge)
- Hounslow TW6 (Cranford)
- Richmond TW9 (Oliver's Island)
- Southall UB2 (North Hyde, Norwood Green)
- Hayes UB3 (North Hyde)

=== Settlement ===
The borough's area is approximately quarter parkland. Large areas of London's open space fall within its boundaries, including Chiswick House and Gardens, Gunnersbury Park, Syon Park, Osterley Park, Hounslow Heath, Avenue Park in Cranford, and Hanworth Park. The borough's predominant land use is mainly residential, with a large, commercial town centre of Hounslow. Other large town centres include Chiswick, Feltham and Brentford. Business is mainly focused on retail and aviation (due to the proximity of Heathrow Airport), especially in the west of the borough (Hounslow and Feltham). Parts of the Borough, including Chiswick, Turnham Green, Osterley and Old Isleworth are some of the most expensive parts of Outer London, with other areas such as Hounslow, Feltham and Heston being more affordable.

=== Attractions, parks and open spaces ===
Major parks and recreational spaces include; Chiswick Gardens, Chiswick common, Turnham Green, Gunnersbury Park, Gunnersbury Triangle Nature reserve, Carville Hall Parks, Claypond Garden, Boston Manor Park, London Playing field, Syon Park, Osterley Park, Thornbury Park, Lampton Park, Inwood Park, Heston Sports Ground, Hounslow Heath, Avenue Park, Crane Park, Letrim Park, Hanworth Park and Bedfont Lakes Country Park. Parks that are a short distance from Hounslow's border are; Ravenscourt Park (London Borough of Hammersmith and Fulham), Acton Green common, Acton Park, Ealing common, Elthorne Parkin the London Borough of Ealing, Cranford Park in the London Borough of Hillingdon, Hampton common, Fulwell Golf club, Crane Park (Whitton), Murray Park, Kew Gardens, Old Deer Park, Marble Hill Park, Richmond Park, Ham Lands, Bushy Park and Hampton Court in the London Borough of Richmond-upon-Thames.

The River Thames forms the natural boundary between Hounslow and Richmond-upon-Thames. It runs through the borough at Chiswick, Brentford and Isleworth. Various tributaries and dis tributaries of the Thames flow through the borough, including; The River Crane, River Brent/Grand Union Canal, Duke of Northumberland's River, Longford River and the Feltham Hill Brook to name a few.

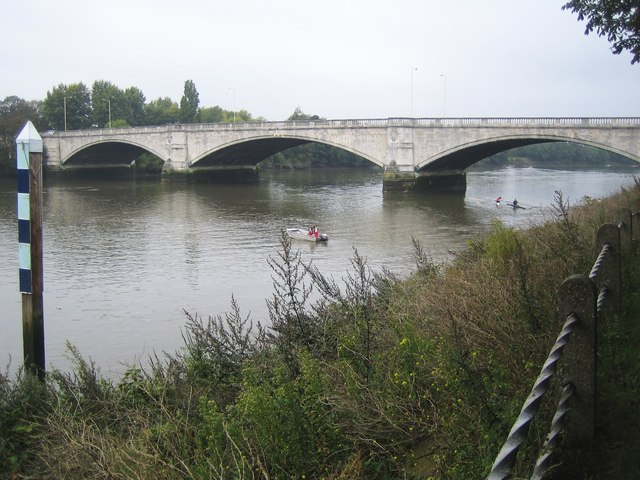
River Thames at Chiswick overlooking Chiswick Bridge

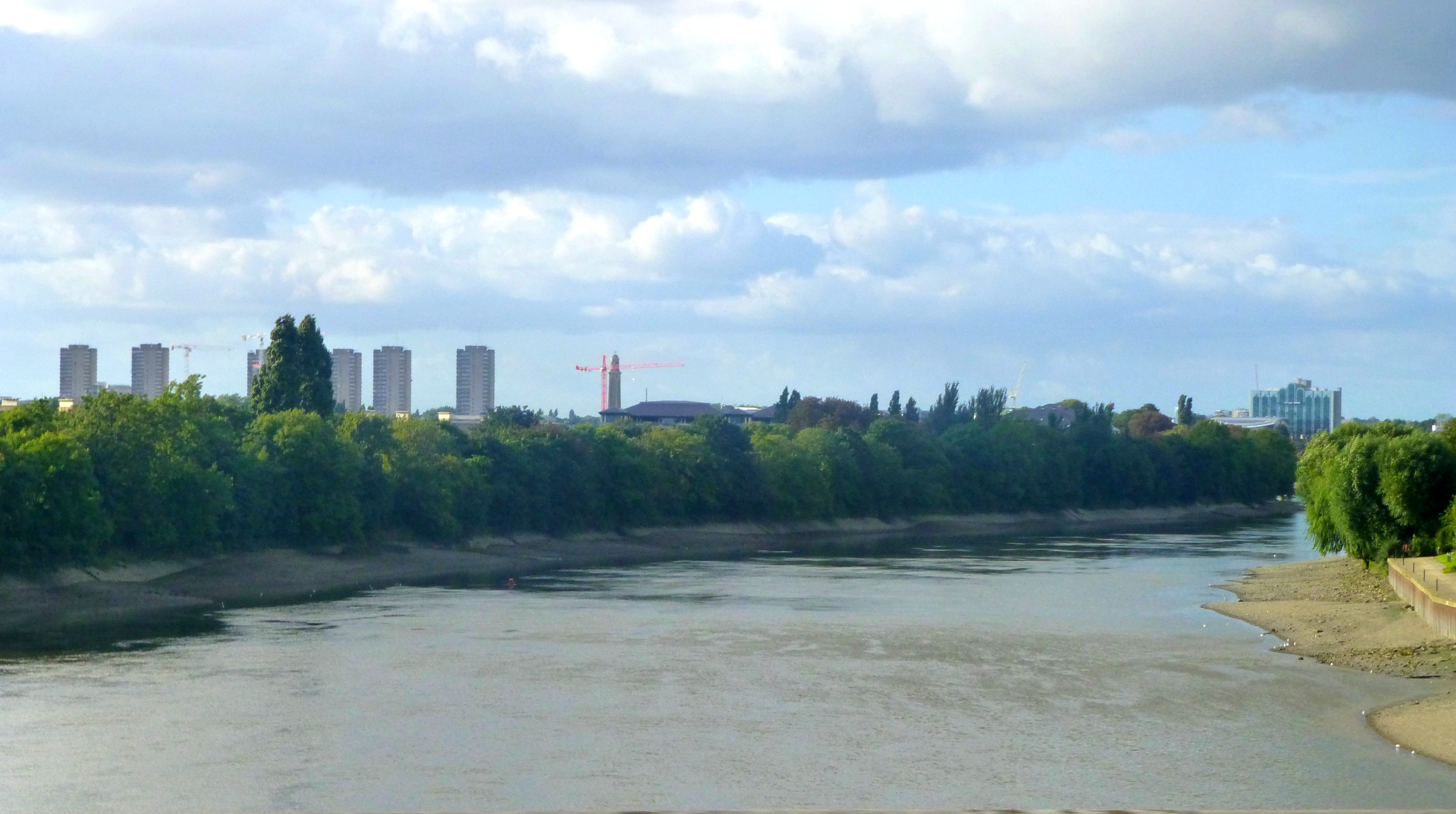
The Thames looking towards Brentford, Chiswick and Hammersmith, with the Brentford Towers on the left.

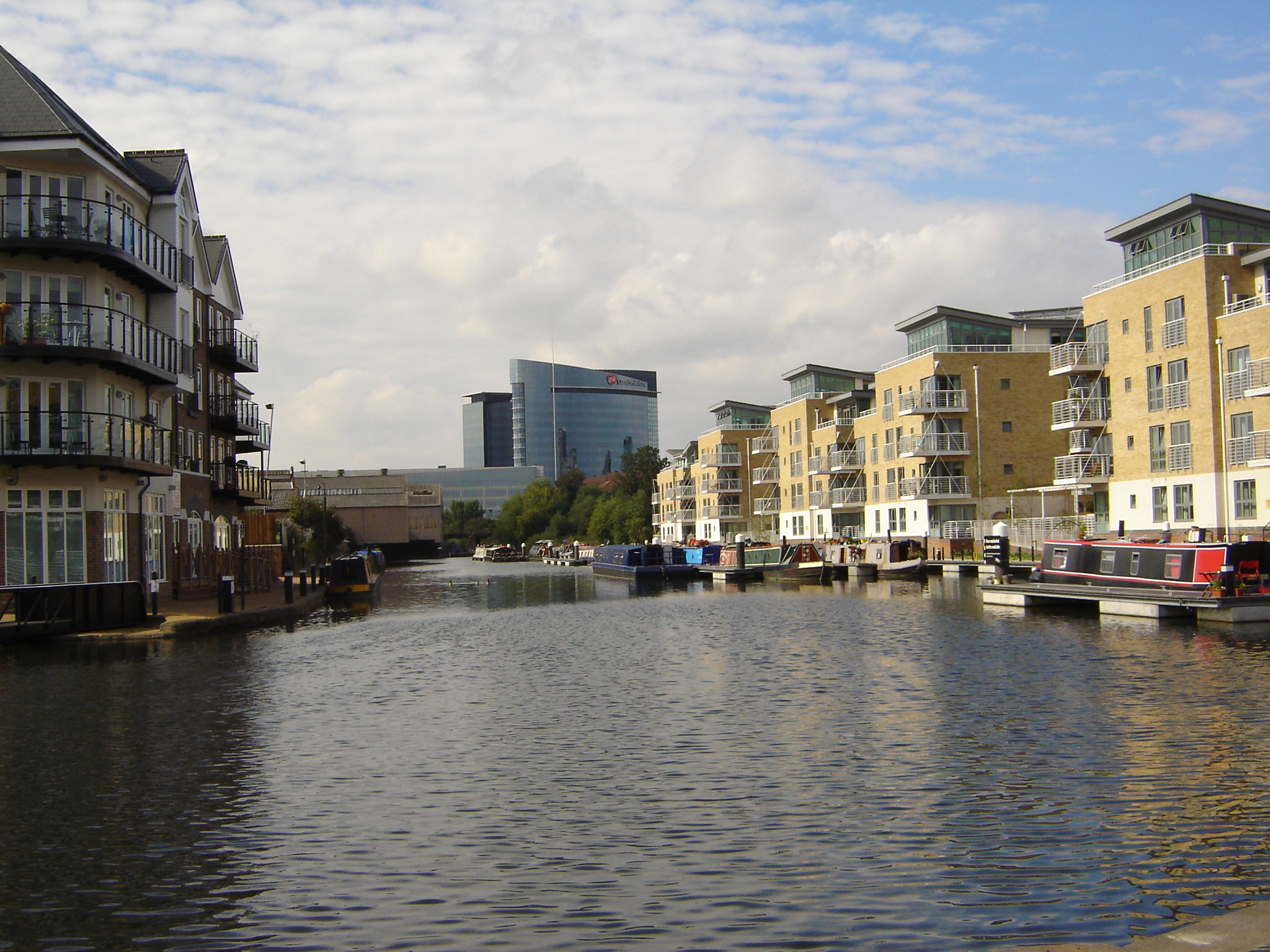
Brentford Lock development with GlaxoSmithKline building in the background

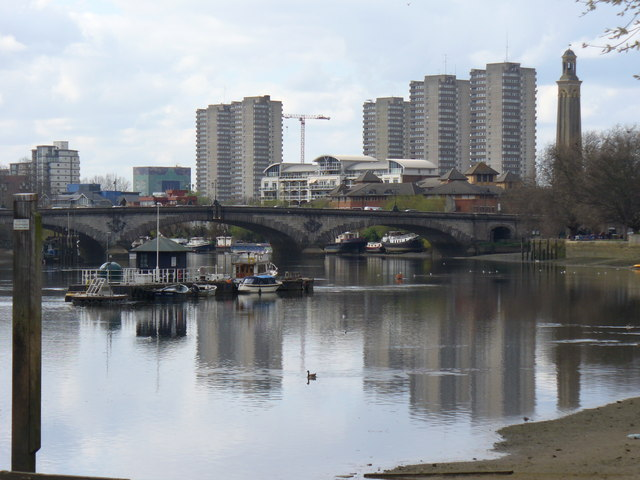
View from Chiswick, from right to left; Brentford Museum of Water and Steam pumping tower, Kew Bridge (Centre), River Thames, Brentford Towers, GSK building

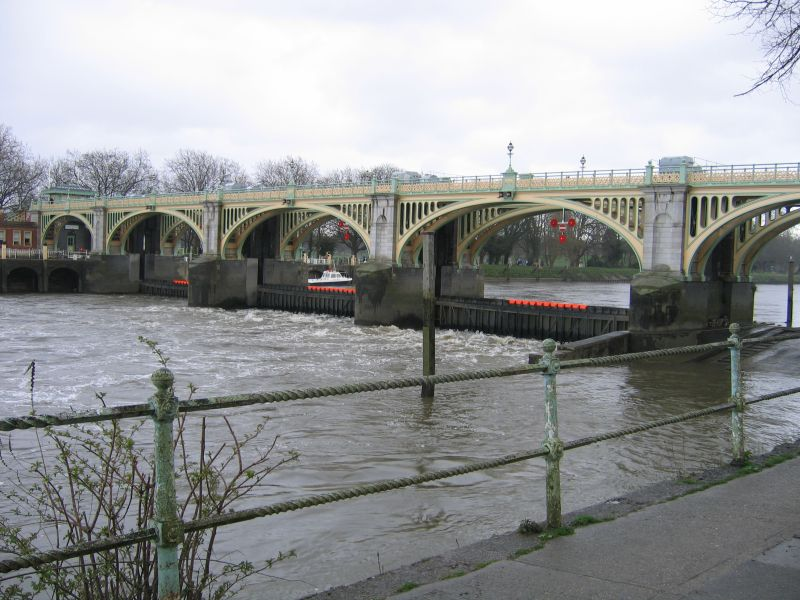
Richmond Lock view from Isleworth

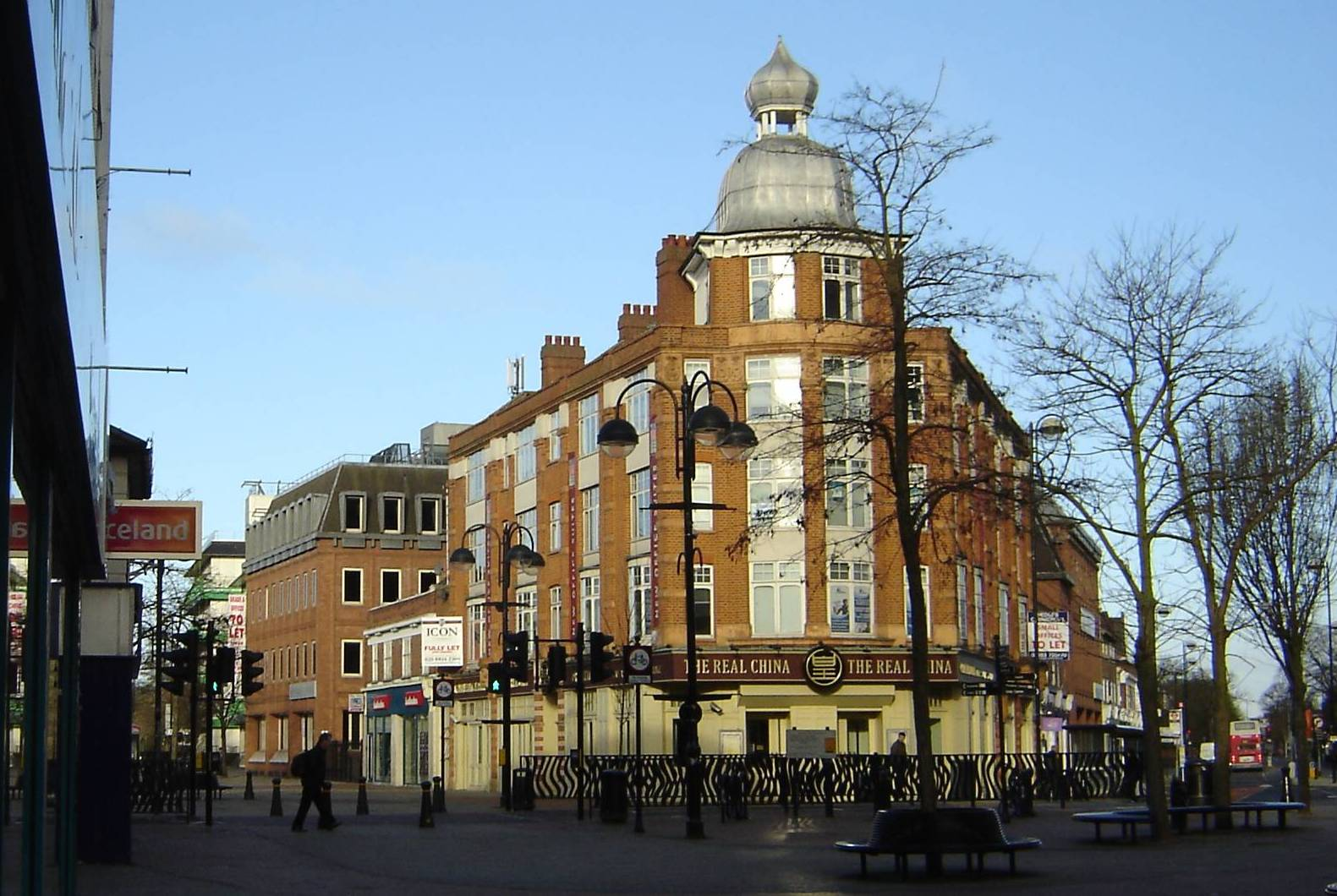
West End of Hounslow High Street

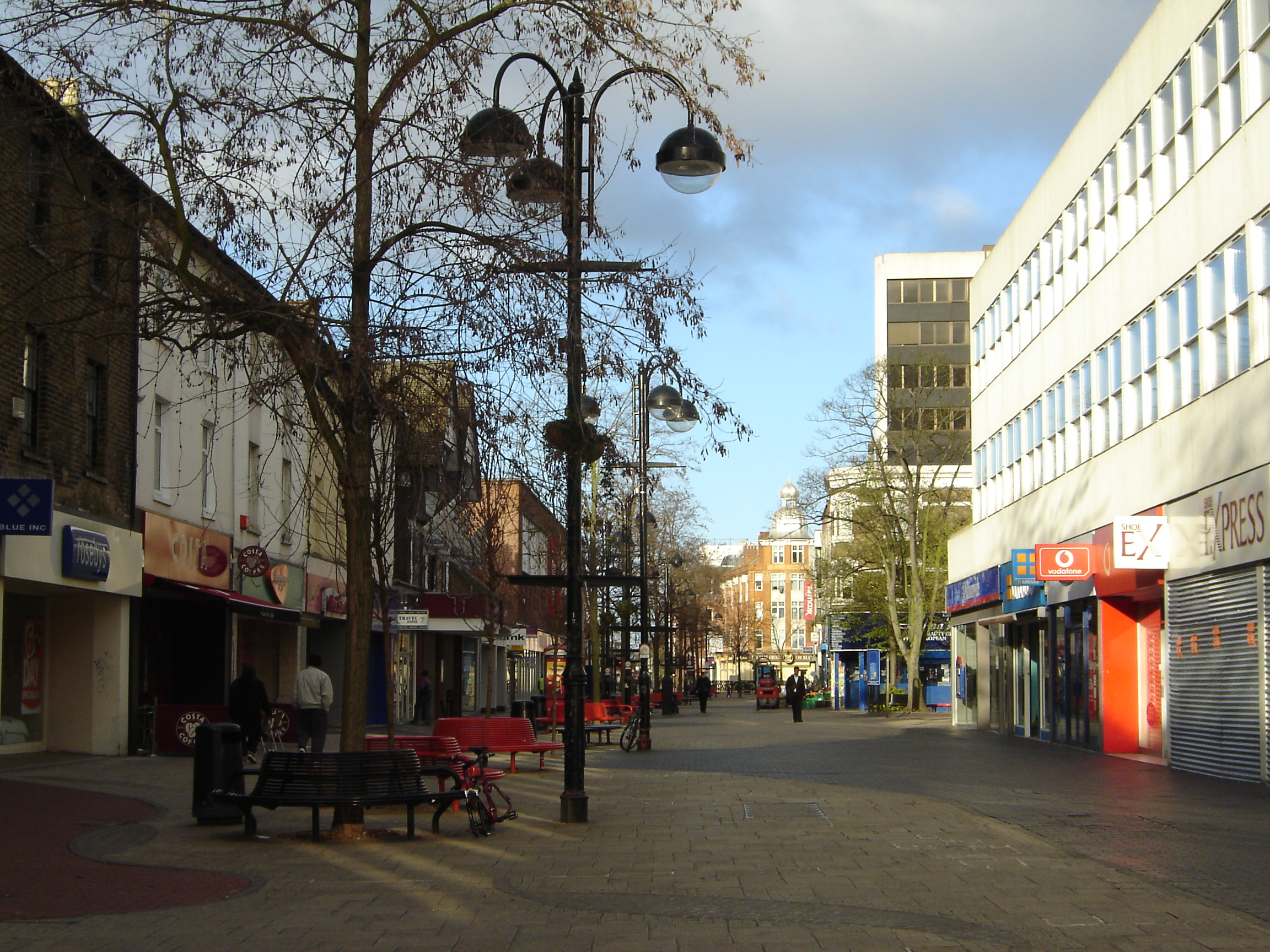
Central section of Hounslow High Street

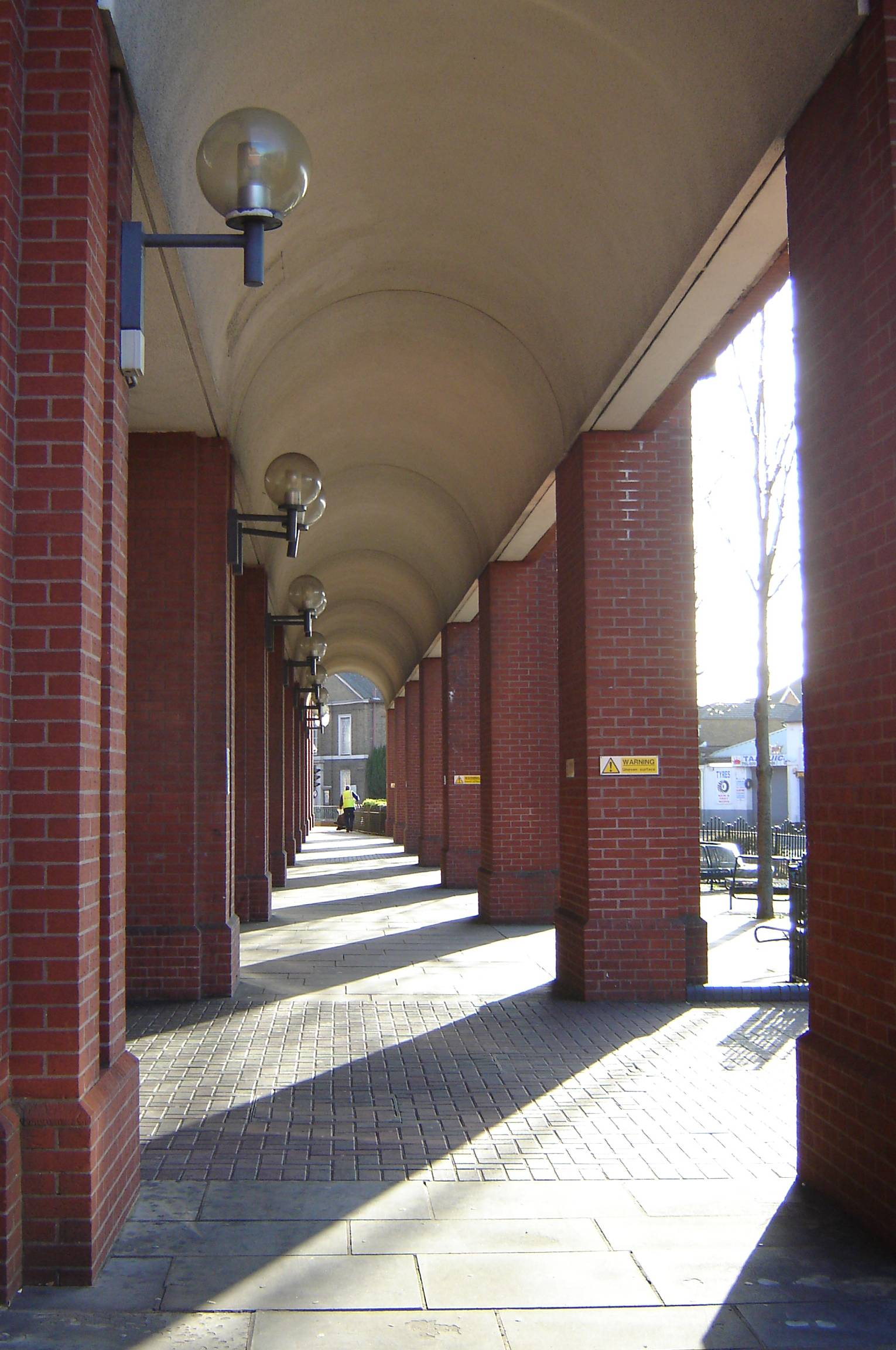
Back of Treaty Centre, Hounslow

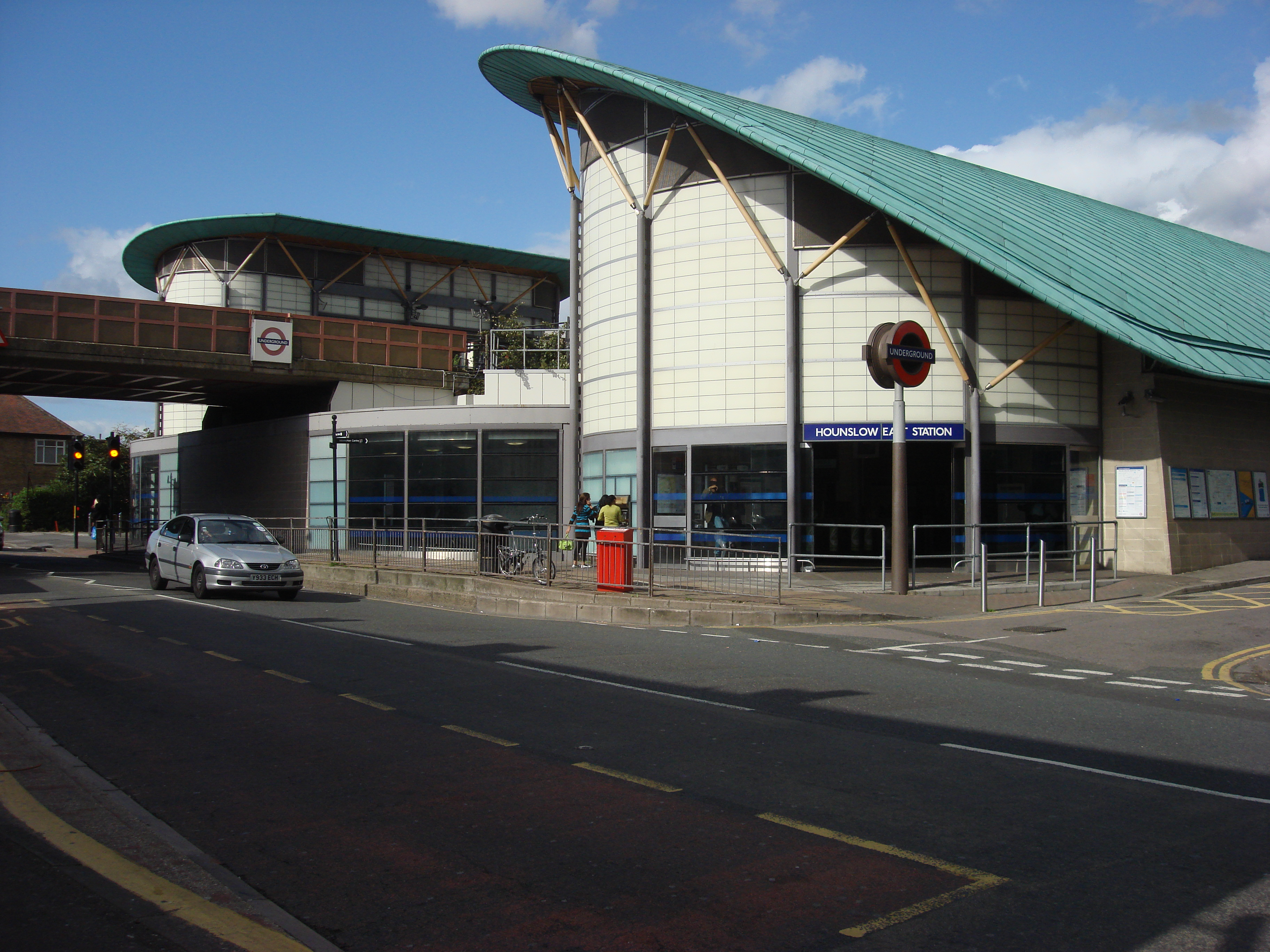
Hounslow East

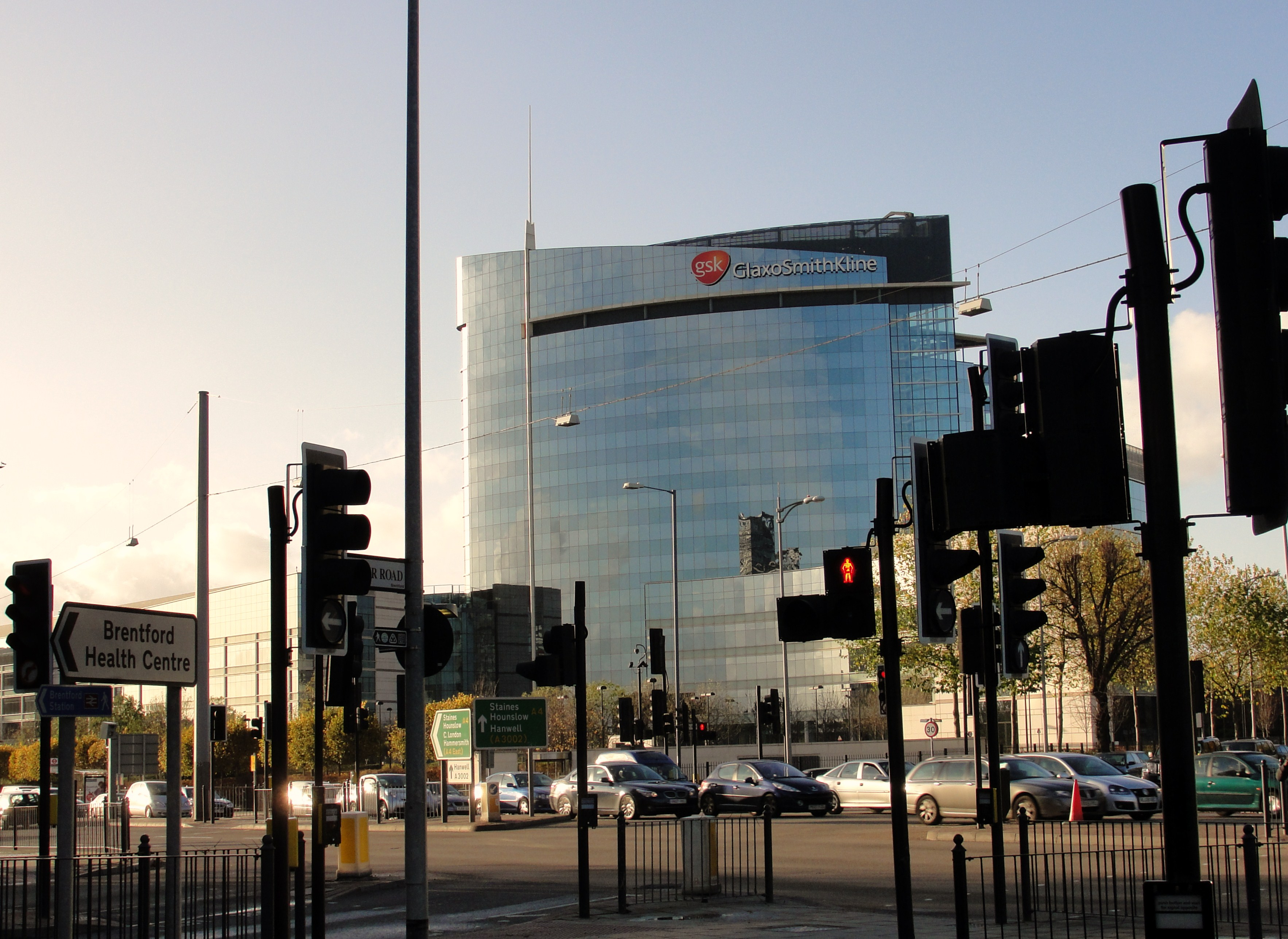
GSK building at Brentford

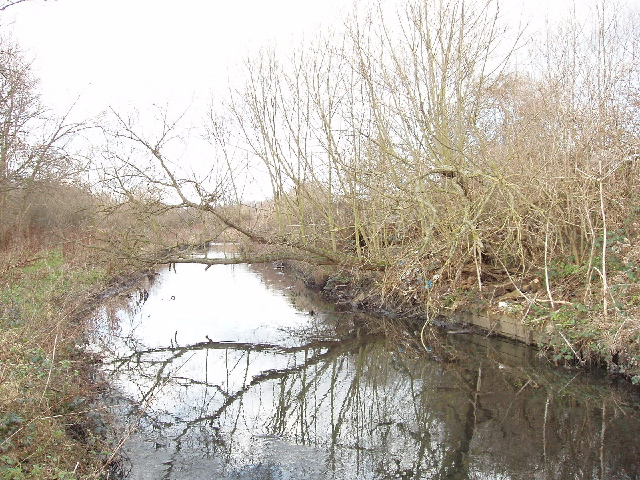
River Crane at Hounslow Heath, Separating Feltham and Hounslow

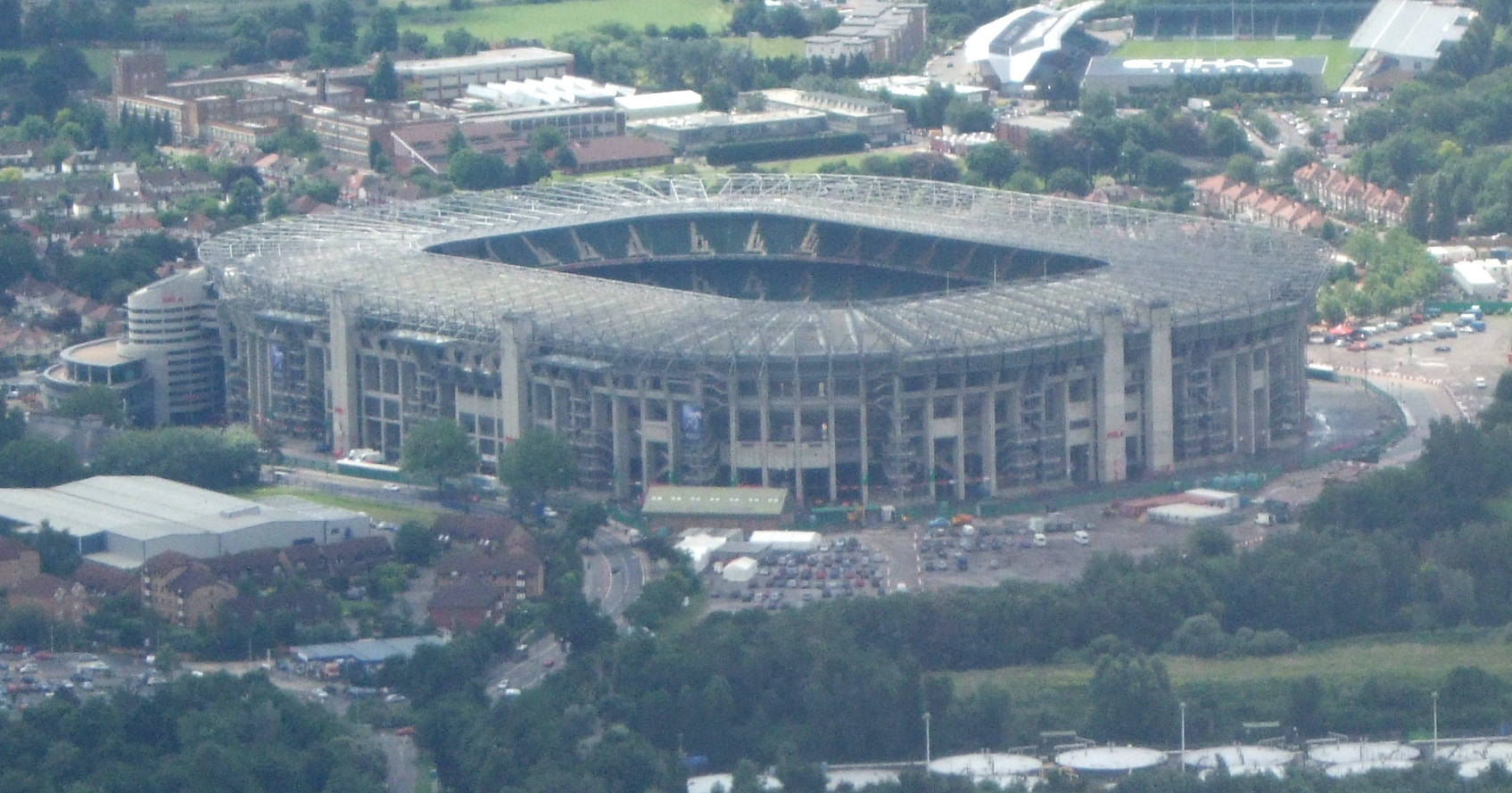
View from Isleworth of Twickenham Stadium

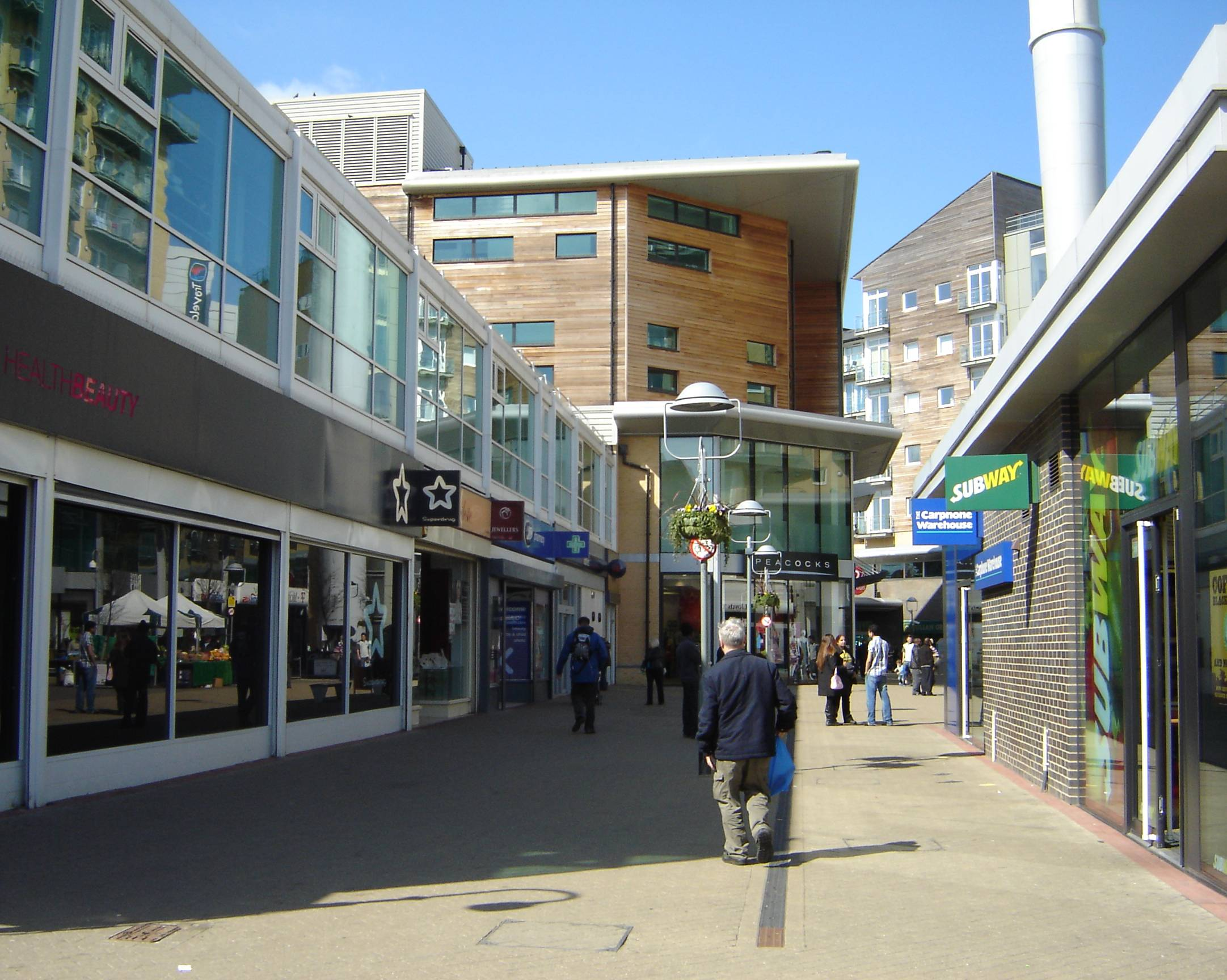
The centre, Feltham

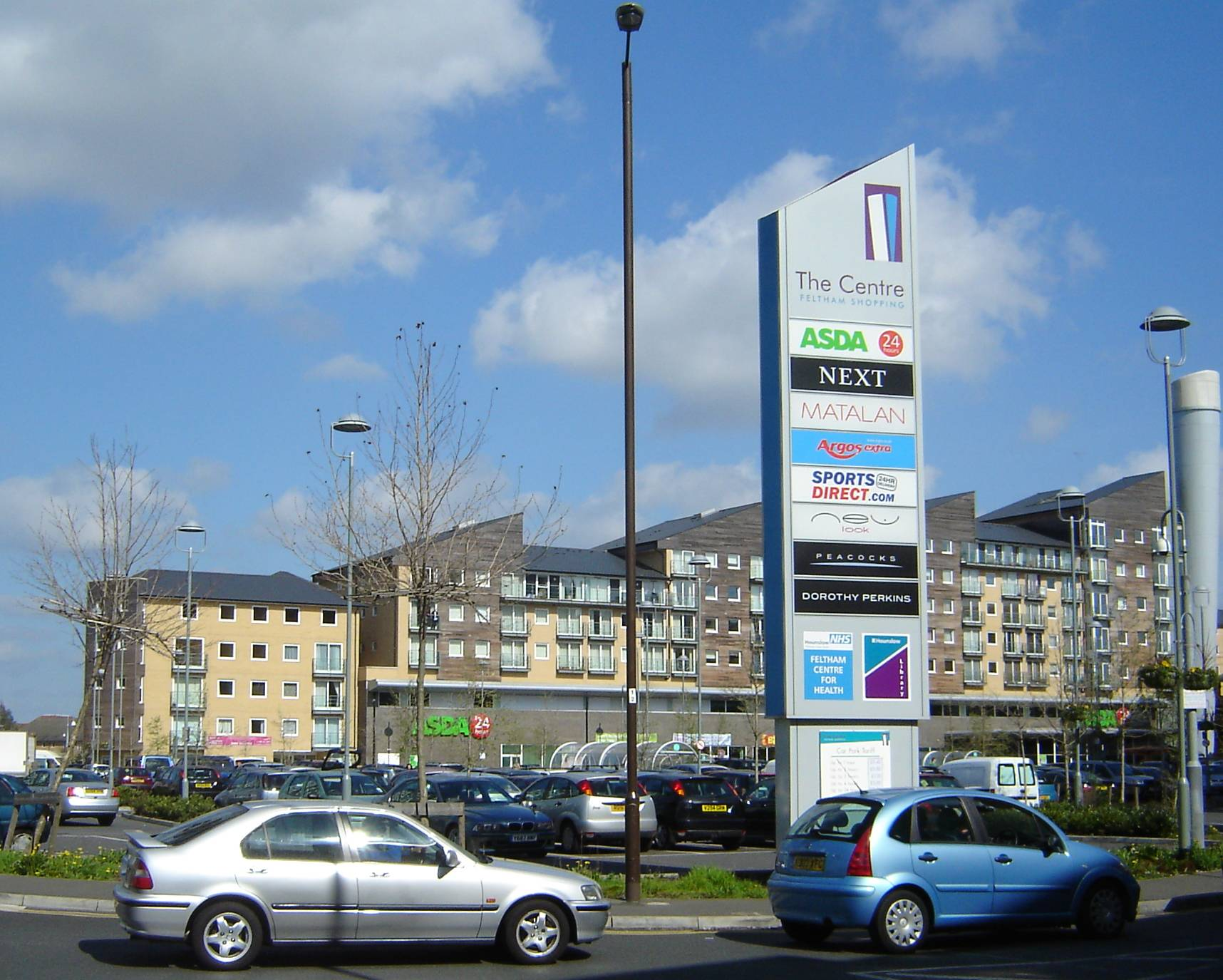
New Developments at The centre, Feltham

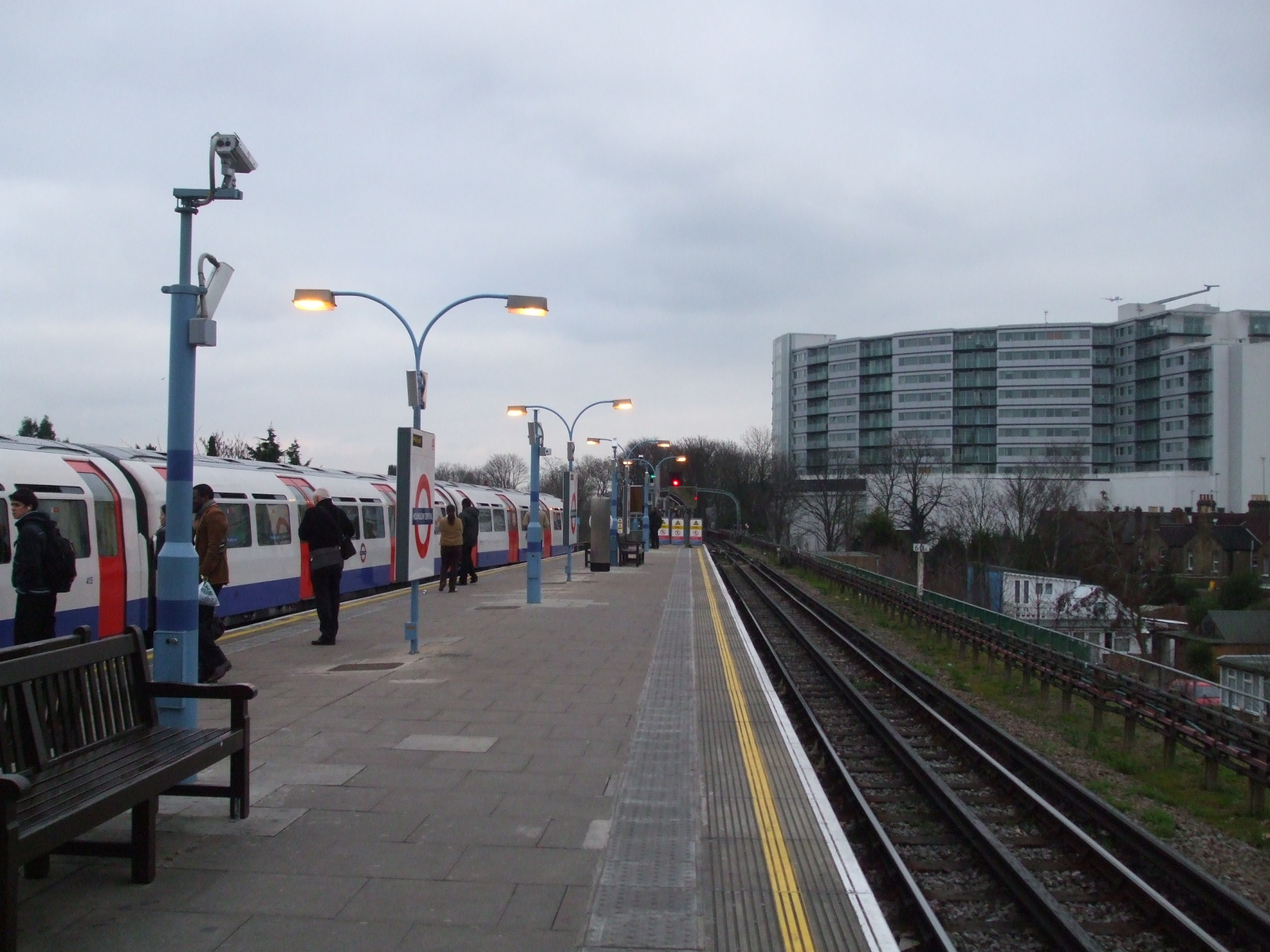
View of the Blenhiem Centre from Hounslow Central Station

== Governance ==
The local authority is Hounslow Council, based at Hounslow House in Bath Road.

=== Greater London representation ===
Since 2000, for elections to the London Assembly, the borough forms part of the South West constituency.

=== Transport ===
==== Air ====
Hounslow abuts the perimeter of Heathrow Airport in the London Borough of Hillingdon. Plans for the expansion of Heathrow Airport are vigorously opposed by Hounslow if such plans increase or widen noise and pollution, weighed against arguments of greater employment and spending.

==== Bridges ====
Four bridges join Hounslow to London Borough of Richmond upon Thames on the south side of the Thames:

- Barnes Railway Bridge
- Chiswick Bridge
- Kew Railway Bridge
- Kew Bridge

Previously, the Borough also encompassed part of Richmond Lock and Twickenham Bridge. This changed in 1994 when the adjacent areas surrounding these bridges were transferred to the London Borough of Richmond upon Thames.

There are several bridges crossing the River Brent, Grand Union Canal, River Crane and Duke of Northumberland's River.

==== River ====
River services between Westminster Pier and Hampton Court depart from Kew Gardens Pier just across the River Thames from Hounslow.

==== Road ====
Major roads in the Borough include:

- A4 Great West Road/Bath Road
- A205 South Circular Road
- A406 North Circular Road
- A312 The Parkway
- A316 Chiswick Lane/Great Chertsey Road
- M4

==== Rail and London Underground ====
The borough is well connected to Central London, Heathrow Airport, other London boroughs and Southeast England as a whole through various National Rail and London Underground stations. The South Western Railway serves the borough's five main towns (with additional stops at Kew Bridge and Syon Lane). London Underground District and Piccadilly lines enter the borough from Central London in the east heading either to other West and Southwest London suburbs (with the London Overground's North London Line) or towards Heathrow.

National Rail stations:

(All stations are either on the Hounslow Loop Line or Waterloo to Reading line.)

- Chiswick (Zone 3)
- Kew Bridge (Zone 3)
- Brentford (Zone 4)
- Syon Lane (Zone 4)
- Isleworth (Zone 4)
- Hounslow (Zone 5)
- Feltham (Zone 6)

London Underground and London Overground stations:

District Line (Ealing and Richmond branches) and Piccadilly Line (Heathrow and Uxbridge branches)

- Stamford Brook (Zone 2)
- Turnham Green (Zone 2/3) - only served by the Piccadilly Line early mornings and late evenings

District Line (Ealing branch) and Piccadilly Line (Heathrow and Uxbridge branches):

- Chiswick Park (Zone 3)*
- Acton Town (Zone 3)*

District Line and North London Line (Richmond branch):

- Gunnersbury (Zone 3)

Piccadilly line (Heathrow Branch):

- Boston Manor (Zone 4)
- Osterley (Zone 4)
- Hounslow East (Zone 4)
- Hounslow Central (Zone 4)
- Hounslow West (Zone 5)
- Hatton Cross (Zone 5/6)*

*Chiswick Park, Acton Town and Hatton Cross omit the borough boundaries and are in the London Boroughs of Ealing and Hillingdon.

==== Travel to work ====
In March 2011, the main forms of transport that residents used to travel to work were (of all residents aged 16–74):

- driving a car or van, 26.7%;
- bus, minibus or coach, 10.5%;
- underground, metro, light rail, tram, 10.5%;
- train, 5.5%;
- on foot, 5.0%;
- work mainly at or from home, 2.9%;
- bicycle, 2.2%.

== Economy ==
The borough is home to the headquarters of GlaxoSmithKline and Sky plc, both based in Brentford's 'Golden Mile' stretch of the A4 Great West Road, and several supermarket outlets once known across the globe for its cluster of factories and offices, and is currently going under extensive re developments in the form of new apartment blocks and offices. Fuller's Griffin Brewery is also in the borough, in Chiswick. Aston Martin were based in Feltham for several years before moving to Newport Pagnell, Buckinghamshire.

DHL Air UK has its head office in Hounslow.

Air France-KLM's head office for United Kingdom and Ireland operations, which includes facilities for Air France and KLM, is located in Plesman House in Hatton Cross in the borough. (Note: The facility's inauguration was on 6 July 2006. Air France moved the office from Hammersmith, where it had been located for 15 years, to Hatton.) The Plesman House, outside of Terminal 4 of London Heathrow Airport, has the UK commercial team, sales team, and support team. Sega Europe has its head office in Brentford. Menzies Aviation has its head office by the airport in Feltham. JCDecaux UK has its head office in Brentford.

Before winding-up British Mediterranean Airways was headquartered at Hetherington House near London Heathrow Airport

A 2017 study by Trust for London and the New Policy Institute found that pay inequality in Hounslow is the second largest of any London borough. It also found that 25% people in Hounslow live in poverty, which is slightly lower than the London-wide poverty rate of 27%.

Chiswick Business Park also hosts the UK office of multinational businesses such as Aker Solutions, Danone, Starbucks, Tullow Oil, Singapore Airlines. Several Chinese entities such as Air China, Jaecoo, Omoda, Chery also call the area home. It is an important location for media companies, where Paramount Pictures, Warner Bros. Entertainment, Sky UK, CBS, Fox News, CGTN, IMG and QVC also maintain an office presence.

== Demography ==
Population pyramid of the Borough of Hounslow in 2021

44.1% of the borough's population is White, 36.6% is Asian, and 7.2% is Black. The most noticeable South Asian populations in the borough are in Hounslow, Heston and Cranford, all of which also have considerable Eastern European populations. The majority of Afro-Caribbean, East & West African populations are situated around the Brentford, Isleworth and Feltham areas. The majority of the White British population reside in the eastern and western parts of the borough (Chiswick, Brentford, Isleworth, Osterley, Hanworth, Feltham and Bedfont), with this population being most prominent in the affluent areas of Chiswick and Osterley.

In terms of religion, 42% identify themselves as Christian, 14% Muslim, 10.3% Hindu, 5.5% Sikh, 1.4% Buddhist and 0.3% Jewish; 18% of the population is not religious. At 5.5%, Hounslow has one of the largest proportion of Sikhs in London, and the eighth-highest in England. Hounslow also has a very prominent Somali community, particularly in the Heston West/North Hyde and the Ivybridge-Isleworth wards respectively with the 5th highest Somali population density in the UK behind St Raphael's, Church End-Harlesden, Hayes Town and Small Heath (Birmingham)

The following table shows the ethnic group of respondents in the 2001 and 2011 census in Hounslow.

Population census
Year	Pop.	±%
1801	11,672	—
1811	13,717	+17.5%
1821	15,861	+15.6%
1831	17,817	+12.3%
1841	20,924	+17.4%
1851	23,095	+10.4%
1861	32,942	+42.6%
1871	42,789	+29.9%
1881	52,637	+23.0%
1891	65,836	+25.1%
1901	85,688	+30.2%
1911	111,565	+30.2%
1921	132,823	+19.1%
1931	158,134	+19.1%
1941	183,060	+15.8%
1951	211,916	+15.8%
1961	209,161	−1.3%
1971	206,469	−1.3%
1981	198,967	−3.6%
1991	209,016	+5.1%
2001	212,344	+1.6%
2011	253,957	+19.6%
2021	288,181	+13.5%
2024 estimate	299,424	+3.9%
Note: 2024 estimate

Ethnic Group	Year											
Ethnic Group	1971 estimations		1981 estimations		1991 census		2001 census		2011 census		2021 census	
Ethnic Group	Number	%	Number	%	Number	%	Number	%	Number	%	Number	%
White: Total	–	91.8%	163,161	82.9%	154,473	75.6%	137,754	64.87%	130,505	51.39%	127,083	44.09%
White: British	–	–	–	–	–	–	118,421	55.77%	96,264	37.91%	81,933	28.40%
White: Irish	–	–	–	–	–	–	6,198	2.92%	4,775	1.88%	3,894	1.40%
White: Gypsy or Irish Traveller	–	–	–	–	–	–	–	–	183	0.07%	1,276	0.40%
White: Other	–	–	–	–	–	–	13,135	6.19%	29,283	11.53%	39,980	13.90%
Asian or Asian British: Total	–	–	–	–	40,178	19.7%	54,352	25.60%	87,257	34.36%	105,846	36.7%
Asian or Asian British: Indian	–	–	–	–	29,128	14.6%	36,812	17.34%	48,161	18.96%	60,827	21.10%
Asian or Asian British: Pakistani	–	–	–	–	5,244	2.6%	9,127	4.30%	13,676	5.39%	17,454	6.10%
Asian or Asian British: Bangladeshi	–	–	–	–	635	0.3%	1,125	0.53%	2,189	0.86%	2,699	0.90%
Asian or Asian British: Chinese	–	–	–	–	1,293	0.6%	1,842	0.87%	2,405	0.95%	2,664	0.90%
Asian or Asian British: Other Asian	–	–	–	–	3,878	1.9%	5,446	2.56%	20,826	8.20%	22,202	7.70%
Black or Black British: Total	–	–	–	–	5,608	2.7%	9,237	4.35%	16,813	6.62%	20,810	7.2%
Black or Black British: African	–	–	–	–	2,299	1.1%	5,723	2.70%	10,787	4.25%	14,895	5.2%
Black or Black British: Caribbean	–	–	–	–	2,300	1.1%	2,826	1.33%	3,381	1.33%	3,573	1.2%
Black or Black British: Other Black	–	–	–	–	1,009	0.5%	688	0.32%	2,645	1.04%	2,342	0.8%
Mixed or British Mixed: Total	–	–	–	–	–	–	6,447	3.04%	10,349	4.08%	13,514	4.6%
Mixed: White and Black Caribbean	–	–	–	–	–	–	1,382	0.65%	2,273	0.90%	2,726	0.9%
Mixed: White and Black African	–	–	–	–	–	–	843	0.40%	1,730	0.68%	2,142	0.7%
Mixed: White and Asian	–	–	–	–	–	–	2,407	1.13%	3,390	1.33%	4,128	1.4%
Mixed: Other Mixed	–	–	–	–	–	–	1,815	0.85%	2,956	1.16%	4,518	1.6%
Other: Total	–	–	–	–	4,138	2%	4,551	2.14%	9,033	3.56%	20,928	7.3%
Other: Arab	–	–	–	–	–	–	–	–	3,638	1.43%	5,461	1.9%
Other: Any other ethnic group	–	–	–	–	4,138	2%			5,395	2.12%	15,467	5.4%
Ethnic minority: Total	–	8.2%	33,609	17.1%	49,924	24.4%	74,587	35.13%	123,452	48.61%	161,098	55.8%
Total	–	100%	196,770	100%	204,397	100%	212,341	100.00%	253,957	100.00%	288,181	100%

=== Immigration ===
This list includes top-15 sources of immigration to Borough of Hounslow for 2021 census:

#	Country	Number
1	India	38,028
2	Poland	11,105
3	Pakistan	8,255
4	Afghanistan	6,444
5	Romania	5,443
6	Sri Lanka	3,755
7	Kenya	3,429
8	Nepal	3,032
9	Somalia	2,593
10	Ireland	2,507
11	Italy	2,392
12	Sri Lanka	2,365
13	Philippines	2,031
14	Portugal	1,960
15	Bulgaria	1,556

== Football clubs ==
- Brentford F.C.

The borough of Hounslow has several Non-League football clubs:

- CB Hounslow United F.C. who play at the Osterley Sports Ground.
- Hanworth Villa F.C. who play at Rectory Meadow.
- Bedfont & Feltham F.C. who play at the Orchard in East Bedfont.
- Bedfont Sports F.C. who play at the Bedfont Sports Recreation Ground.
- Ashford Town F.C. (Middlesex) who play at The Robert Parker Stadium.

The borough is also home to the rugby side Staines RFC who play at the Reeves Ground in Hanworth.

== Twinning ==
Hounslow has a sister district agreement with Leningradsky District in Krasnodar Krai, Russia. Hounslow is also twinned with Issy-les-Moulineaux in Île-de-France, France, and Ramallah in the West Bank, Palestine.

== People from Hounslow ==
Ian Gillan, vocalist for Deep Purple, and formerly of Black Sabbath and Gillan, is a native of Hounslow. Alistair Overeem, a UFC fighter, was born here, and Hip-Hop rapper and producer MF Doom also was born in Hounslow.

== Freedom of the Borough ==
The following people and military units have received the Freedom of the Borough of Hounslow.

=== Individuals ===
- Jagdish Sharma, Mayor of the London Borough of Hounslow from 1979 to 1980
- Lance Sergeant Johnson Beharry: 17 September 2014.

=== Military units ===
- 2nd Battalion the Royal Regiment of Fusiliers: 2009.
- The Royal British Legion: 12 March 2017.

== See also ==
- Hounslow local elections
- The Community Group (London Borough of Hounslow)
- Hounslow power station

== Notes and references ==
Notes
