= North Hyde =

Coordinates: 51.492900°N 0.385401°W

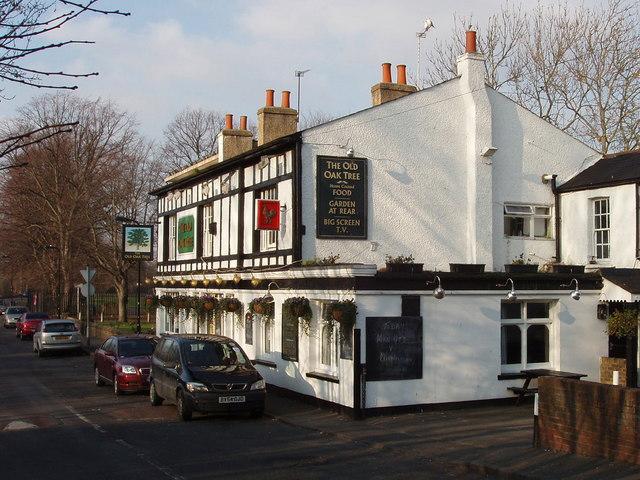
- The Old Oak Tree pub, North Hyde

- Location within Greater London
- London borough: Hounslow
- Ceremonial county: Greater London
- Region: London
- Country: England
- Sovereign state: United Kingdom
- Post town: Southall, Hounslow
- Postcode district: UB2, UB3
- Postcode district: TW5
- Dialling code: 020
- Police: Metropolitan
- Fire: London
- Ambulance: London
- London Assembly: South West

North Hyde is a suburban development situated between the towns of Heston and Southall under the administrative control of the London Borough of Hounslow. It is bordered to the north by the Grand Union Canal mainline and to the south by the M4. The area now consists of a mixture of mostly large, semi detached suburban properties. It is also home to the Airlinks golf course and Convent Way, an estate with a mixture of high and low-rise housing.

== Etymology ==
The name North Hyde is thought to mean "north land", seeming to mean area of land lying to the north of Heston. There is some evidence to suggest that this area of land was named by a wealthy Saxon land owner trying to avoid paying taxes to the parish of Heston.

== History ==
Before the 18th century, North Hyde formed part of the infamous Hounslow Heath.

During the Napoleonic Wars, the Board of Ordnance (responsible for provision of arms, artillery and other items to the armed forces) took the decision to establish an Ordnance Depot at North Hyde, alongside the Grand Junction Canal. Mindful of the vulnerability of its coastal gun wharves and gunpowder magazines to a possible seaborne attack, the Board planned to establish inland depots at points on the canal network; (another was established at Weedon Bec, Northamptonshire, at around the same time). 47 acres (19 ha) of land alongside the canal was compulsorily purchased; work began in 1813 and took four years to complete. The depot initially consisted of three magazines, each holding 6,800 barrels of powder, along with ancillary buildings and an adjacent barracks for three officers and fifty soldiers to guard the site. The complex was enclosed within a branch of the canal, which (as well as creating a defensive perimeter) provided the powder barges with direct access to the magazines, mixing houses and cooperages. By 1830 some 42,000 barrels of gunpowder were being stored at the North Hyde Depot; the following year, however, the depot closed. The magazines were demolished not long afterwards. The canal branch (known as the Hanwell Loop) continued in use, at least until the 1880s, serving a brickworks which had been established on the site; it was gradually filled in during the first half of the 20th century.

In 1842, the former barracks were taken over by the Belgian Catholic order of the Brothers of Our Lady of Mercy and turned into an orphanage for Roman Catholic boys (St Mary's Orphanage). In 1914 it was reconstituted as an Industrial School; it closed in 1934 and the buildings were later demolished.

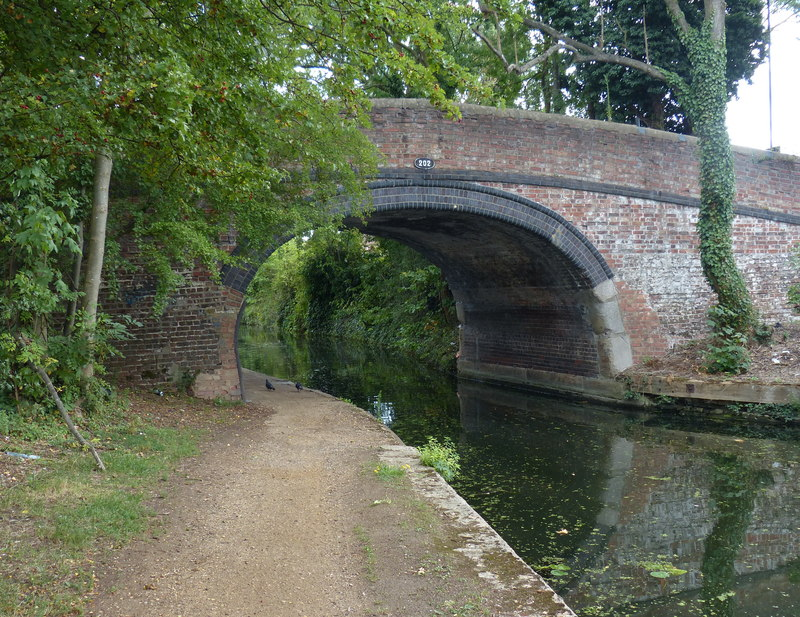
North Hyde Lane Bridge over the Grand Union Canal

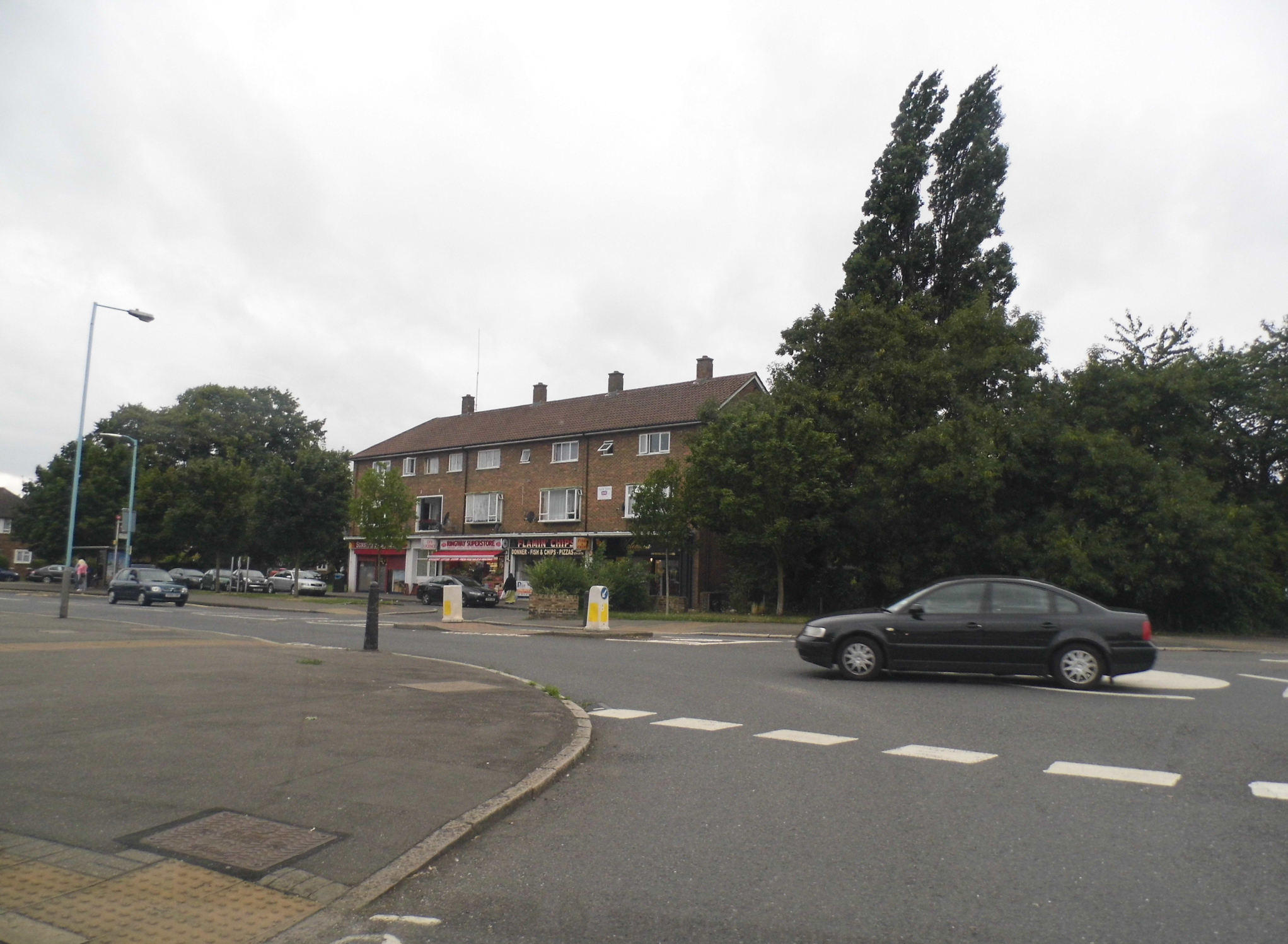
Shops on North Hyde Lane

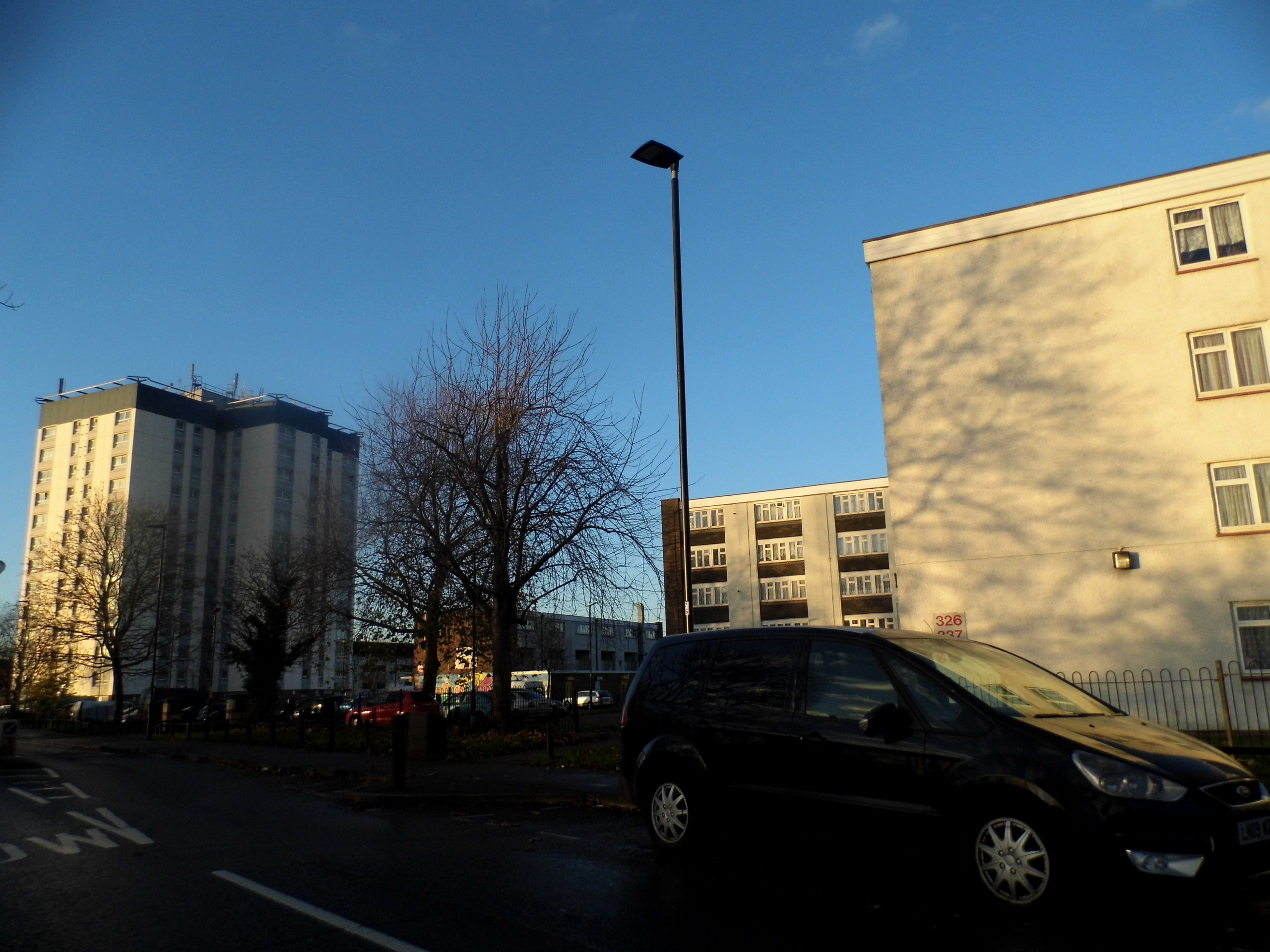
Flats on Convent Way
