= Jagdish Sharma (councillor) =

British councillor (1934–2026)

Jagdish Sharma MBE

Mayor of the London Borough of Hounslow
- In office 1979–1980
- Deputy: Edward Pauling
- Preceded by: James Duffy
- Succeeded by: John Coveney

Personal details
- Born: 1934
- Died: 2026 (aged 91–92)
- Party: Labour

Jagdish Sharma MBE (1934–2026) was a British councillor who served as Mayor of the London Borough of Hounslow from 1979 to 1980. He was the first Asian mayor in the United Kingdom.

== Biography ==
Jagdish Sharma was born and raised in India.

For his services to local government, Sharma was awarded an MBE in 1995 and in 2000 he received the freedom of the borough. First elected to the council in 1974, Sharma served as Mayor of the London Borough of Hounslow from 1979 to 1980, and was the first Asian mayor in the United Kingdom. Sharma studied economics at Punjab University where he graduated with a master's degree. In 1965 he migrated to the UK where began as a mathematics teacher. During his 30-year career in the Inner London Education Authority, he later led the maths department at Lady Margaret School in Southall where he became head teacher. In 2014, Sharma retired from his leadership of the Hounslow Council. He died at the age of 91 in 2026 following a long battle with cancer.
