= Leningradskaya (rural locality) =

Leningradskaya Ленинградская
- Stanitsa
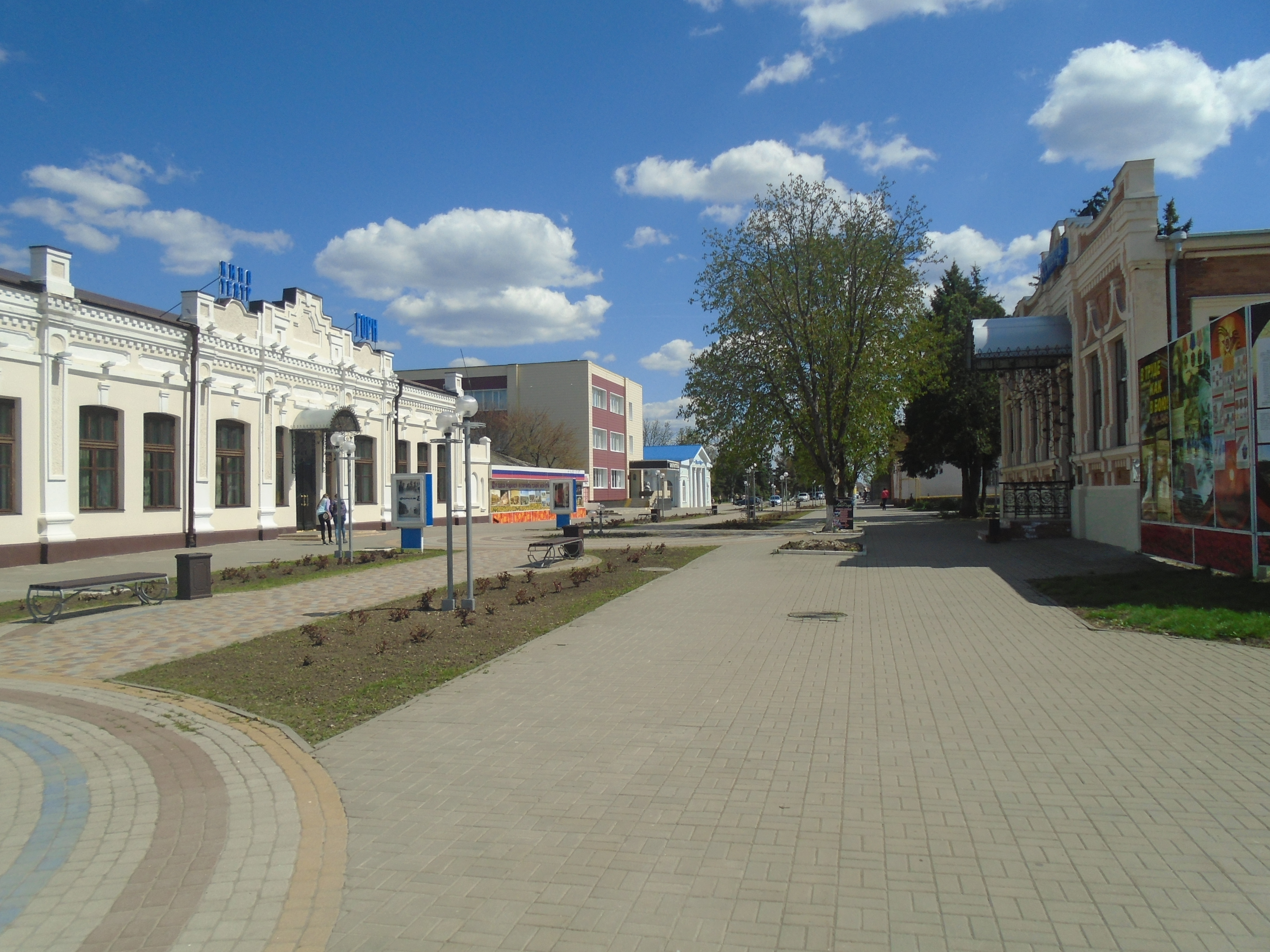
- Interactive map of Leningradskaya
- Location of Leningradskaya Leningradskaya (Krasnodar Krai)
- Coordinates: 46°19′N 39°23′E
- Country: Russia
- Federal subject: Krasnodar Krai
- Administrative district: Leningradsky District
- Founded: 1794
- Elevation: 25 m (82 ft)

Population (2010 Census)
  - Total: 36,940
  - Estimate (2021): 35,561 (−3.7%)

Administrative status
  - Capital of: Leningradsky District
- Time zone: UTC+3 (MSK)
- Postal code: 353740–353745
- Dialing code: +7 86145
- OKTMO ID: 03632410101

Leningradskaya (Russian: Ленингра́дская; Ukrainian: Ленінградська, romanized: Leninhradska) is a rural locality (a stanitsa) and the administrative center of Leningradsky District in Krasnodar Krai, Russia. It is requested that the name of the town be changed. Population: 36,940 (2010 census); 38,218 (2002 census); 34,554 (1989 Soviet census).

== History ==
Founded in 1794 as Umanskaya (Russian: Уманская, Ukrainian: Уманська), named after the Ukrainian city of Uman. It was one of the first forty settlements by the Black Sea Cossacks in the Kuban region. It became a stanitsa in 1842. The stanitsa was the administrative center of the Yeysky Otdel of the Kuban Oblast.

According to the 1926 census in the North Caucasus Krai, there were 4,353 households and 20,727 inhabitants (9,733 men and 10,994 women) in the settlement, of which Ukrainians - 82.06% or 17,008 people, Russians - 14.85% or 3077 people.

Umanskaya survived the fall of 1932 and the winter of 1933, when hundreds of residents starved to death. In 1934, all the surviving population (1,200 families) was evicted in the northern regions of the Soviet Union and to Kazakhstan. In their stead, the stanitsa was repopulated by families from the Belarusian and Leningrad military districts, and its name was changed to Leningradskaya.
