= Leningradsky, Voronezh Oblast =

Leningradsky Ленинградский
- Settlement
- Location within Voronezh Oblast Location within Russia
- Coordinates: 51°01′N 40°56′E
- Country: Russia
- Region: Voronezh Oblast
- District: Talovsky District
- Time zone: UTC+3:00

Leningradsky (Russian: Ленинградский) is a rural locality (a settlement) in Nizhnekamenskoye Rural Settlement, Talovsky District, Voronezh Oblast, Russia. The population was 70 as of 2010.

== Geography ==
It is located 17 km southeast of Talovaya.
