= Hounslow power station =

Former power station in England

- Country: England
- Location: Hounslow London
- Coordinates: 51°28′10″N 00°20′53″W
- Status: Decommissioned and demolished
- Construction began: 1900
- Commission date: 1904
- Decommission date: 1964
- Owners: Heston and Isleworth Borough Council (1900–1948); British Electricity Authority (1948–1955); Central Electricity Authority (1955–1957); Central Electricity Generating Board (1958–1964)
- Operator: As owner

Thermal power station
- Primary fuel: Coal
- Secondary fuel: Diesel
- Turbine technology: Steam turbines, diesel engines
- Cooling source: water from well, spray pond

Power generation
- Units operational: 1 x 1 MW, 1 x 1.35 MW, 2 x 0.9 MW
- Make and model: Brush Ljungstrom, General Motors
- Nameplate capacity: 4.15MW
- Annual net output: 2327 kW (1920)

Hounslow power station generated and supplied electricity to the district of Hounslow, Heston and Isleworth in west London from 1904 to 1964. Originally steam powered, diesel engine generators were added in the 1950s.The station was owned and operated by Heston and Isleworth Borough Council until the nationalisation of the electricity industry in 1948. The power station was redeveloped as demand for electricity grew and old plant was replaced until its closure in 1964.

== History ==
In 1900 Heston and Isleworth Urban District Council applied for a provisional order under the Electric Lighting Acts to generate and supply electricity to the district. The Heston and Isleworth Electric Lighting Order 1900 was granted by the Board of Trade and was confirmed by Parliament through the Electric Lighting Orders Confirmation (No. 12) Act 1900 (63 & 64 Vict. c. clxx). The council built a generating station in Bridge Street, Hounslow (51°28′10″N 0°20′53″W) known as Hounslow power station. It was first commissioned in November 1904.

The station continued to generate electricity for the council until the nationalisation of the British electricity industry in 1948. The Heston and Isleworth electricity undertaking was abolished, ownership of the power station was vested in the British Electricity Authority, and subsequently the Central Electricity Authority and the Central Electricity Generating Board (CEGB). At the same time the electricity distribution and sales responsibilities of the council’s electricity undertaking was transferred to the Southern Electricity Board (SEB). The station was decommissioned in 1964.

== Equipment specification ==
By 1923 the generating plant comprised:

- Boilers generating 42,500 lb/h (5.35 kg/s) of steam, this was supplied to:
- Generators
  - 2 × 125 kW reciprocating engine generators
  - 2 × 250 kW reciprocating engine generators
  - 1 × 500 kW reciprocating engine generator

These machines gave a total generating capacity of 1,250 kW of direct current.

Electricity supplies to consumers were at 480 & 240 Volt DC.

The plant in 1958 comprised:

- Boilers:
  - 3 × Babcock & Wilcox 12,500 lb/h (1.57 kg/s) boilers with chain grate stokers, operating at 200 psi and 550 °F (13.8 bar and 288 °C) and feeding steam to two generating sets:
- Generating sets
  - 1 × 1,000 kW Fraser & Chalmers–GEC DC generator set
  - 1 × 1,350 kW Brush Ljungstrom AC turbo-alternator,
  - 2 × 900 kW General Motors diesel engines coupled to Elliott alternators
- The total installed generating capacity was 4.15 MW, with an output capacity of 3 MW.

Condenser cooling water was drawn from a well, there was also a spray pond.

== Operations ==
Summary operating data for Hounslow power station:

Operating data for Hounslow power station 1912–46
Year	Plant generating capacity kW	Max load kW	Connection on system kW	Electricity generated MWh	Load factor per cent	No. of customers
1912/13	750	498	760	1,093	–	954
1918/19	1,380	1,067	–	1,848	20.4	–
1919/20	–	–	–	2,327	19.7	–
1921	1,250	1,210	3,440	2,234	23.2	–
1922	1,250	1,311	3,991	2,186	23.1	–
1923	1,250	1,365	3,904	2,210	24.4	–
1923/24	1,250	1,422	4,204	2,181	20.0	2,109
1936/37	2,100	14,395	85,384	747	40.7	23,993
1946	–	3,360	–	1,500	–	–

The use of electricity in the period 1921–23 was:

Heston and Isleworth undertaking electricity use 1921–23
Electricity Use	Units	Year		
Electricity Use	Units	1921	1922	1923
Lighting and domestic	MWh	393	679	751
Public lighting	MWh	121	148	171
Traction	MWh	0	0	0
Power	MWh	1,507	1,357	1,444
Total use	MWh	2,021	2,184	2,367

=== Operating data 1954–63 ===
Operating data for Hounslow power station:

Hounslow power station operating data, 1954–63
Year	Running hours	Load factor per cent	Max output capacity MW	Electricity supplied MWh	Thermal efficiency per cent
Steam plant
1954	282	–	2	452	6.76
1955	428	–	2	752	8.10
1956	298	–	2	491	7.85
1957	151	–	2	248	6.48
1958	298	–	2	564	7.95
1961	–	0.7	1	61	8.70
1962	–	0.4	1	37	6.16
1963	–	–	–	–	–
Diesel plant
1954	323	87.5	1.8	509	–
1955	423	88.9	1.8	677	–
1956	242	79.9	1.8	348	–
1957	54	67.9	1.8	66	–
1958	342	92.8	1.8	571	–
1961	–	3.7	2	586	29.89
1962	–	3.6	2	560	30.14
1963	–	8.43	2	1,476	30.57

Electricity output, in MWh, from the Hounslow power station

== Closure ==
The steam plant was decommissioned in 1963 and the rest of Hounslow power station was closed in 1964. As of 2020 the site was an electricity substation.

== See also ==
- Timeline of the UK electricity supply industry
- List of power stations in England
