= Leningradskoye gas field =

Natural gas field in Yamalo-Nenets Autonomous Okrug, Russia

Leningradskoye
- Country: Russia
- Region: Yamalo-Nenets Autonomous Okrug
- Offshore/onshore: offshore
- Operator: Gazprom

Field history
- Discovery: around 1990

Production
- Estimated gas in place: 2×10^{12} m^{3} 70×10^{9} cu ft

The Leningradskoye gas field is a natural gas field located in the Kara Sea (Yamalo-Nenets Autonomous Okrug). It was discovered in around 1980 and is not yet in operation.
