= Leningradsky District, Krasnodar Krai =

Leningradsky District Ленинградский район
- District
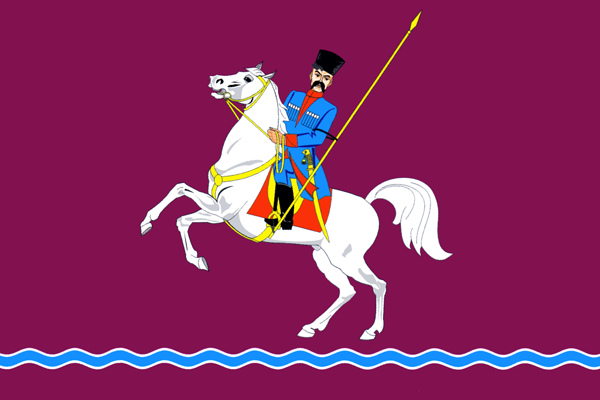
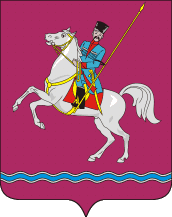
- Flag Coat of arms
- Location of Leningradsky District in Krasnodar Krai
- Coordinates: 46°19′N 39°22′E
- Country: Russia
- Federal subject: Krasnodar Krai
- Administrative center: Leningradskaya

Area
  - Total: 1,416 km^{2} (547 sq mi)

Population (2010 Census)
  - Total: 63,505
  - Density: 44.85/km^{2} (116.2/sq mi)
  - Urban: 0%
  - Rural: 100%

Administrative structure
  - Administrative divisions: 12 rural okrug
  - Inhabited localities: 33 rural localities

Municipal structure
  - Municipally incorporated as: Leningradsky Municipal District
  - Municipal divisions: 0 urban settlements, 12 rural settlements
- Time zone: UTC+3 (MSK)
- OKTMO ID: 03632000
- Website: http://www.adminlenkub.ru/

Leningradsky District (Russian: Ленингра́дский райо́н) is an administrative district (raion), one of the thirty-eight in Krasnodar Krai, Russia. As a municipal division, it is incorporated as Leningradsky Municipal District. It is located in the north of the krai. The area of the district is 1,416 square kilometers (547 sq mi). Its administrative center is the rural locality (a stanitsa) of Leningradskaya. Population: 63,505 (2010 Census); 66,679 (2002 Census); 61,352 (1989 Soviet census). The population of Leningradskaya accounts for 58.2% of the district's total population.

== Sister district ==
- Hounslow, England, United Kingdom
