= List of monastic houses in Kent =

The following is a list of the monastic houses in Kent, England.

Locations of monastic houses in Kent
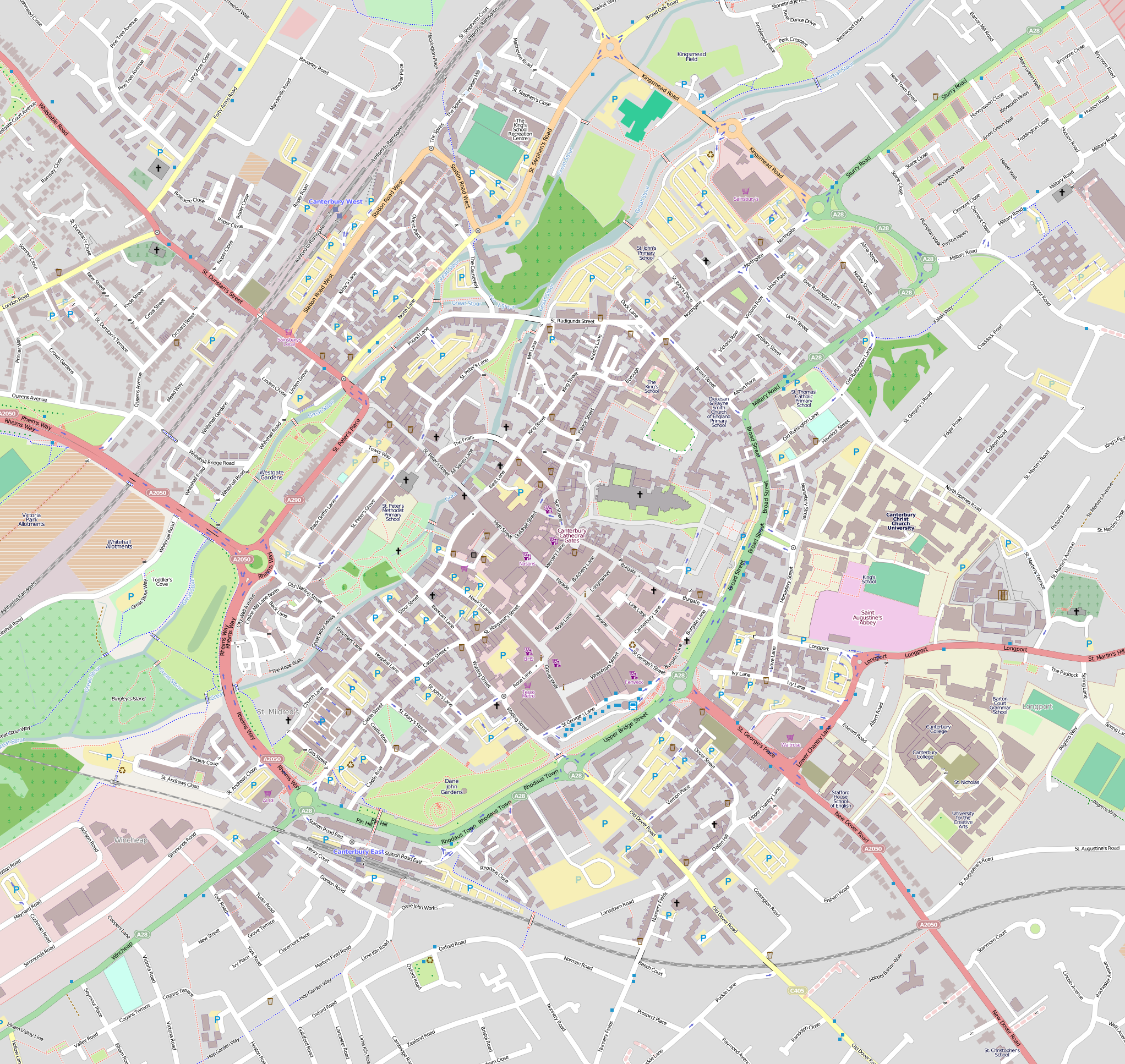
Locations of monastic houses in Canterbury
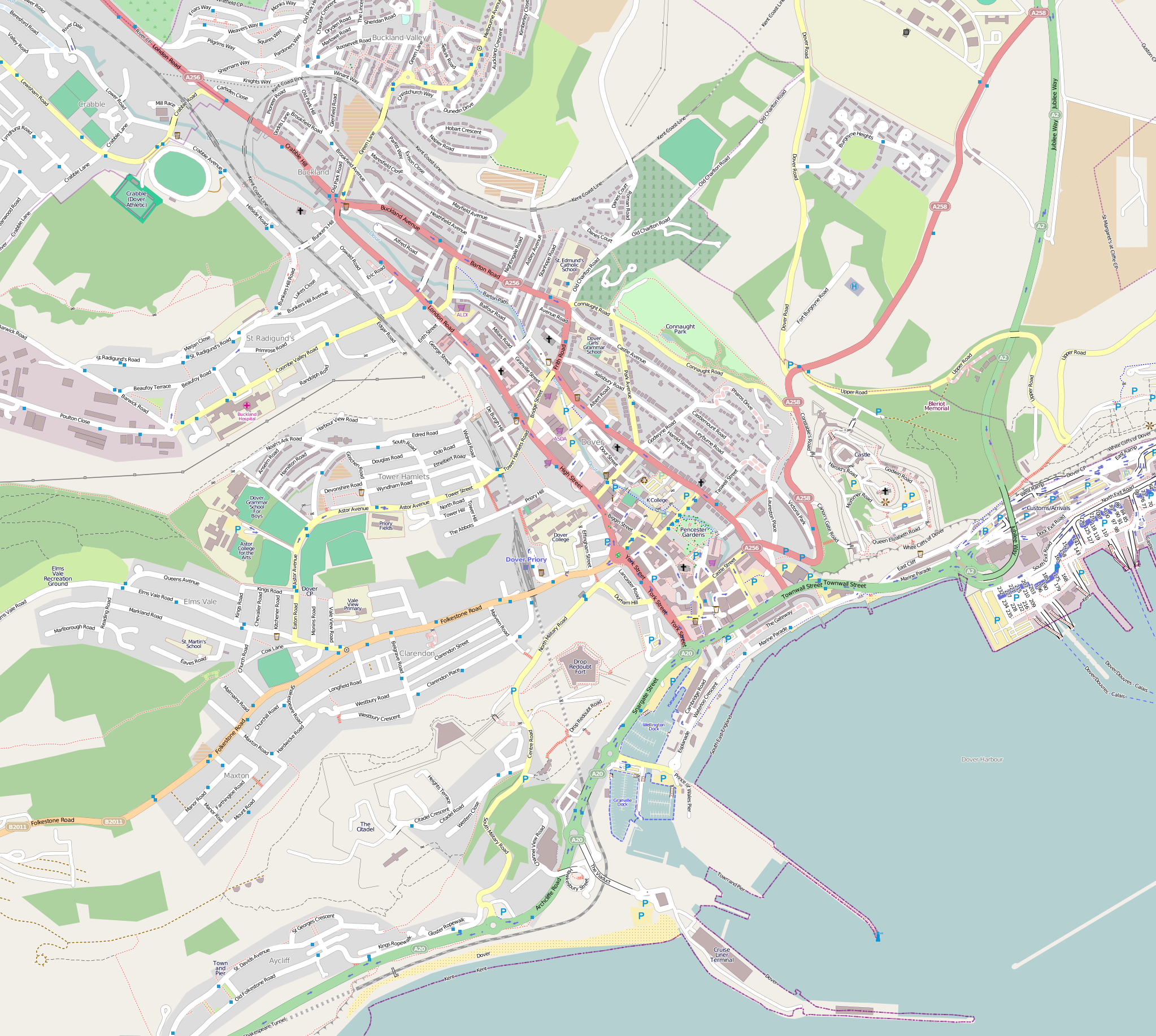
Locations of monastic houses in Dover

Alien houses are included, as are smaller establishments such as cells and notable monastic granges (particularly those with resident monks), and also camerae of the military orders of monks (Knights Templar and Knights Hospitaller). Monastic hospitals are included where they had the status or function of an abbey, priory, or preceptor/commandery.

Abbreviations and key

Status of remains
Symbol	Status
None	Ruins
*	Current monastic function
^{+}	Current non-monastic ecclesiastic function (including remains incorporated into later structure)
^	Current non-ecclesiastic function (including remains incorporated into later structure) or redundant intact structure
^{$}	Remains limited to earthworks etc.
^{#}	No identifiable trace of the monastic foundation remains
^{~}	Exact site of monastic foundation unknown
^{≈}	Identification ambiguous or confused

Locations with names in italics indicate possible duplication (misidentification with another location) or non-existent foundations (either erroneous reference or proposed foundation never implemented) or ecclesiastical establishments with a monastic name but lacking actual monastic connection.

Trusteeship
EH	English Heritage
LT	Landmark Trust
NT	National Trust

Foundation	Image	Communities & provenance	Formal name or dedication & alternative names	References & location
Aylesford Priory *		Carmelite Friars founded 1242 by Richard de Grey, Lord of Cudnor (Richard, Lord Grey); conventual church built 1242–1248; rebuilt 1348–1417; dissolved 1538; granted to Sir Thomas Wyat 1541/2; church demolished, conventual buildings converted for private residence; rebuilt after fire 1930; Carmelite Friars from 1949	'The Friars'	51°18′11″N 0°28′19″E
Badlesmere Priory		Augustinian Canons Regular founded 8th century		
Badmonden Priory		Augustinian Canons Regular (?)alien house: cell dependent on Beaulieu, Normandy dissolved 1414; granted to St Andrew's Priory, Rochester; dissolved 1540; granted to the dean and chapter of Rochester		
Bilsington Priory ^		Augustinian Canons Regular founded 1253 by John Mansell (Maunsel), Lord Chief Justice of England; dissolved 28 February 1536; granted to the Archbishop of Canterbury 1538/9; used as a farmhouse through post-medieval period; remains now incorporated into a house		51°04′57″N 0°54′57″E
Blakwose Priory		Premonstratensian Canons cell of Lavendon, Buckinghamshire founded before 1158; transferred to St Radegund's after 1203–4; retained as a grange of the abbey; dissolved c.1377	Blackwose Priory	51°04′27″N 1°04′04″E
Boxley Abbey ^		Cistercian monks daughter house of Clairvaux; founded 23 October 1143 (1143/46) by William de Ipre, Earl of Kent; dissolved 21 January 1538; granted to Sir Thomas Wyat 1540/1; part of remains now incorporated into a private house	The Priory Church of the Blessed Virgin Mary, Bilsington	51°18′00″N 0°31′29″E
Brockley Abbey	Historical county location. See entry under List of monastic houses in London			
Canterbury Austin Friars, earlier site		Augustinian Friars founded 1318 by Richard French, baker (licence granted to Walter Reynolds, Archbishop of Canterbury by Edward II to alienate part of the former Friars of the Sack site to the Austin Friars); transferred to new site (see immediately below) 1324		51°16′37″N 1°04′54″E
Canterbury Austin Friars		Augustinian Friars (community founded at earlier site (see immediately above) 1318); transferred here 1324; rebuilt 1408; dissolved December 1538; granted to G. Harper 1541/2		51°16′37″N 1°04′54″E
Canterbury Blackfriars ^		Dominican Friars (under the Visitation of London) founded c.1236 (c.1221) by Henry III; church built 1237 to after 1244; dissolved 1538; granted to Thomas Wiseman 1559/60; frater currently in use as a church of the Church of the First Church of Christ Scientist		51°16′53″N 1°04′45″E
Canterbury Cathedral Priory^{+}		secular canons possibly collegiate founded c.600 (598): Roman church restored by St Augustine with the aid of Æthelberht, King of Kent; episcopal diocesan cathedral founded c.600; extant; Benedictine monks founded 997; rebuilt 1070 under Archbishop Lanfranc; dissolved 1539;	The Cathedral and Abbey Church of Christ, Canterbury, The Cathedral Church of Christ, Canterbury	51°16′47″N 1°04′59″E
Canterbury Friars of the Sack		Friars of the Sack founded before 1274; some friars apparently transferred to new site at Cambridge before 1289; dissolved after 1314		51°16′50″N 1°04′39″E
Canterbury Greyfriars, earlier site		Franciscan Friars Minor, Conventual (under the Custody of London) founded 1224; transferred to new site (see immediately below) c.1268		
Canterbury Greyfriars		Franciscan Friars Minor, Conventual (under the Custody of London) (community founded apparently on a site north of the hospital (see immediately above) 1224); transferred here c.1268: founded 1270 by John Diggs, an Alderman of the city; Observant Franciscan Friars transferred 1489; dissolved 1534; Franciscan Friars Minor, Conventual transferred from Observants 1534; dissolved 1538; granted to Thomas Spilman 1539/40		51°16′44″N 1°04′36″E
Canterbury — St Augustine's Abbey		Benedictine monks (assumed) founded (598-605) 598 by Æthelberht, King of Kent on the advice of St Augustine; Benedictine monks (re)founded c.960; dissolved 30 July 1538; (EH)	St Peter and St Paul St Peter, St Paul and St Augustine (978) The Abbey Church of Saint Augustine, Canterbury	51°16′41″N 1°05′17″E
Canterbury — St Gregory's Priory		secular monastery founded by 1087 (before 1086) by Lanfranc, Archbishop of Canterbury; Augustinian Canons Regular refounded c.1123; church destroyed by fire 1145, rebuilt; dissolved 1536 (1537); granted to the Archbishop of Canterbury 1536/7	St Gregory's Hospital	51°16′58″N 1°05′04″E
Canterbury — St Mildred's Monastery		purported early Saxon monastery; probable minster 8th century		
Canterbury — Priory of St Sepulchre		Benedictine nuns founded c.1100 by Anselm, Archbishop of Canterbury; dissolved 1536; granted to James Hale 1546/7	St Sepulchre's Nunnery	51°16′26″N 1°05′05″E
Canterbury — St Mary of the Angels Friary *		Franciscan Friars Minor involved in running the Franciscan International Study Centre; extant	Friary of St Mary of the Angels	51°17′45″N 1°03′42″E
Cliffe Cell		Cluniac monks (Note: Cliffe Cell — listed in English Monastic Life but absent in Archives de la France Monastique and others)		
Combwell Priory^{#}		Augustinian Canons Regular abbey founded c.1220 by Robert de Turneham; reduced to priory status c.1220 due to endowment shortfall; disputed between Augustinian and Premonstratensian — found in favour of Augustinians c.1230; dissolved 1536; granted to Thomas Culpepper 1537/8; granted to Sir John Gage 1542/3	Cumbwell Priory; Combwell Abbey	51°04′26″N 0°26′02″E
Darenth Priory		Benedictine monks cell, apparently dependent on Rochester founded after 971: Archbishop Hubert granted the manor of Darent; dissolution unknown		51°25′00″N 0°14′31″E
Dartford Blackfriars		Dominican Friars (under the visitation of London) founded 1356; attached to the nunnery (see immediately below); prior and friars recorded 1373; dissolved 1539		
Dartford Priory		Dominican nuns (or Augustinian Canonesses) subject to Kings Langley, Hertfordshire founded 1346 by Edward III in the buildings of a former royal palace; dissolved after Elizabeth Cressener died and after 1 April 1539; Henry VIII built a manor house on the site; granted to Edmund Mervyn 1540/1, afterwards becoming the property of the Earl of Salisbury; Dominican nuns — from Kings Langley refounded 1558; dissolved after 1559; granted to Anne of Cleves by Edward VI; later used by Queen Elizabeth; alienated by James I; J & E Hall's engineering works built on part of site	St Mary and St Margaret ____________________; Dertford Priory; Dartford Nunnery	51°26′58″N 0°12′53″E
Davington Priory^{+}^		Benedictine nuns founded 1153 by Fulk de Newenham; dissolved 1535; granted to Sir Thomas Cheney 1546/7; church now in parochial use — priory buildings in private ownership; restored as a private residence 19th century; since 1982 owned by Bob Geldof	The Priory Church of Saint Mary Magdalen, Davington; (parochially also dedicated to St Lawrence)	51°19′09″N 0°53′03″E
Dover Priory, earlier site		Saxon minster, secular canons founded 640 by Eadbald, King of Kent; transferred to St Martin's c.696 (see immediately below) by King Wihtred; church apparently rebuilt 10th century; repaired 1582, but practically unused thereafter and in ruins by 1724; in use as a Fives' Court early-1790s; in use as a garrison coal store during Napoleonic Wars (1793–1815); restored 1862 by Sir George Gilbert Scott and 1888 by William Butterfield	St Mary in Castro (St Mary in the Castle)	51°07′42″N 1°19′24″E
Dover Priory ^		secular canons transferred to from site within the castle (see immediately above) c.696 by King Wihtred; (?abbey 697 (Note: Dover Abbey — Hadcock & Knowles Medieval Religious Houses in England and Wales, p.140)); Augustinian Canons Regular refounded 1131 by Henry I and William de Corbeil, Archbishop of Canterbury; Benedictine monks — from Canterbury (who forced withdrawal of Augustinians) 1136; monks apparently withdrawn; Benedictine monks — sent from Canterbury by Theobald of Bec, Archbishop of Canterbury 1139; cell dependent on Canterbury; dissolved 1535; remains now incorporated into a private school: Dover College	The Priory Church of Saint Mary the Virgin and Saint Martin of the New Work, Dover	51°07′37″N 1°18′27″E
Dover Minster		Saxon minster founded 691; rebuilt 1070s; in parochial use as the Church of St Martin-le-Grand, from 16th century; demolished 18th-19th century; remains destroyed during World War II		51°07′30″N 1°18′45″E
Dover Preceptory (?)		Knights Templar founded c.1128(?) apparently transferred to Temple Ewell before c.1185; (EH)		51°07′09″N 1°18′12″E
Eastry Monastery (?)		a monastery purportedly founded before 673 by King Egbert — existence doubtful		
Elfleet Monastery (?)		founded by Domneva (Note: Elfleet — source: Speed, The History of Great Britaine, p.791) — probably Ebbsfleet (Note: Elfleet — "[actually Ebbsfleet] if [existed] at all": Dugdale, Notitia Monastica) possible duplication of Minster in Thanet Nunnery		
Erith Franciscan Friary *		Capuchin Franciscan Friars founded 1902; present church opened 1963; extant		
Faversham Abbey		Cluniac monks — from Bermondsey, Surrey founded 1148 (1147) by King Stephen and his queen Maud (Matilda) (apparently only nominally Cluniac from the outset); Benedictine monks 13th century (before 1207: by the reign of Henry III); dissolved 8 July 1538	St Saviour	51°19′08″N 0°53′42″E
Folkestone Priory, earlier site		Saxon minster and Benedictine? nuns founded before 640 by Eadbald, King of Kent — built in the castle precinct; destroyed in raids by the Danes before 927 (before 924); Benedictine monks alien house: dependent on Lonlay founded 1095: church granted to Lonlay by Nigel de Munevilla and his wife; abandoned 1137: transferred to new site (see immediately below)	St Mary and St Eanswith	51°04′45″N 1°11′01″E
Folkestone Priory		Benedictine monks alien house: dependent on Lonlay; (community founded at earlier site (see immediately above) before 640); transferred here 1137, permission granted to William de Albrinsis; became denizen:independent from 1399; dissolved November 1539, when priory was ruinous; leased to Edward, Lord Clinton; granted to him 9 January 1539	Falkstone Priory	51°04′43″N 1°10′53″E
Greenwich Friary	Historical county location. See entry under List of monastic houses in London			
Higham Priory		Benedictine nuns alien house: dependent on St-Sulpice-la-Forêt; founded c.1148(?) (1551) by King Stephen; became denizen: independent from after 1227; dissolved 1521–2; granted to St John's College, Cambridge by Henry VIII 1522	Lillechurch Priory; Littlechurch Priory; Heyham Priory	51°26′27″N 0°28′11″E
Hoo Monastery		Benedictine? monks founded c.(686-)687: land on the island (later Hoo St Werburgh) and adjoining granted tn Ecgbald and his familia monastery under an abbot 716; destroyed in raids by the Danes 9th century?		51°27′24″N 0°29′19″E (possible) or 51°24′36″N 0°33′29″E (more likely)
Horton Priory ^		Cluniac monks alien house: cell dependent on Lewes, Sussex; founded c.1142 by Robert de Vere; became denizen: independent from 1351–74; dissolved 1536; granted to Richard Tate 1338–9; thereafter granted to --- Mantell; remains now incorporated into a private house	The Priory Church of St John the Evangelist, Horton ____________________; Monk's Horton Priory; Monkshorton Priory	51°06′52″N 1°00′28″E
Hythe Monastery		uncertain order and foundation		
Leeds Priory		Augustinian Canons Regular founded 1119 by Robert de Crevecoeur (Croucheart/Crepido Corde), Kt.; dissolved c.1540 (1539); granted to Sir Antony St Leger 1550–1	St Mary and St Nicholas ____________________; Leedes Priory	51°14′51″N 0°36′42″E
Lesnes Abbey (Westwood Abbey)	Historical county location. See entry under List of monastic houses in London			
Lewisham Priory	Historical county location. See entry under List of monastic houses in London			
Lossenham Friary		Carmelite Friars founded c.1242-7; destroyed by fire 1275; rebuilt; dissolved 1538	Lossenham Whitefriars	51°01′12″N 0°37′27″E
Lydd Monastery^{+}		Saxon minster possible monastic house founded after 774: land granted to the Archbishop of Canterbury; destroyed in raids by the Danes 893; Anglo-Saxon remains incorporated into All Saints' parish church		50°57′06″N 0°54′25″E
Lyminge Abbey^{+}		Benedictine? nuns founded c.633 by Ethelburga, daughter of Æthelberht, King of Kent, on the site of a possibly Roman villa; monks and nuns refounded before 736 under Abbot Cuthbert; ravaged in raids by the Danes, but continued to after 964 (the time of Archbishop Dunstan); Saxon church, rebuilt c.965, incorporating remains of abbey church	Liming Abbey	51°07′35″N 1°05′13″E
Maidstone Friary		Carmelite Friars; 13th century Allington Castle site sold to Carmelites 1951; in private ownership early-21stC		51°17′36″N 0°30′41″E
Maidstone Franciscan Friary		Franciscan Friars licence obtained 13 May 1331 by John atte Water to alienate in mortmain to the minister and Friars Minors of England property and land in Maidstone to build an oratory and dwelling-place; establishment never implemented		
Minster in Sheppey Priory^{+}		Benedictine? nuns founded c.670; destroyed in raids by the Danes before 900 (855); Benedictine nuns founded before 1087; Augustinian Canonesses? refounded 1123 (1130?, 1150) by William de Corbeil, Archbishop of Canterbury; Benedictine nuns refounded 1186?; Augustinian Canonesses refounded 1396; dissolved 1536; granted to Sir Thomas Cheiney (Cheney) 1537/8; remains of conventual church incorporated into parochial church	St Sexburga St Mary and St Sexburgha ____________________; Shepey Priory	51°25′20″N 0°48′43″E
Minster in Thanet Priory, earlier site		Saxon minster and Benedictine? nuns founded 669, granted by King Egbert to his niece Domneva to found a monastery; destroyed in raids by the Danes 1011; transferred to new site (see immediately below) secular collegiate Benedictine monks granted to St Augustine's Abbey 1027 by King Cnut; refounded as a grange of St Augustine's; 11th-13th century parochial church of St Mary reputedly built on site	St Domneva	51°19′49″N 1°18′56″E (purported)
Minster in Thanet Priory		Benedictine nuns transferred from earlier site (see immediately above)	St Mary Virgin St Mildred	51°19′53″N 1°19′03″E
Minster Abbey *		Benedictine nuns founded 1937; built on site of the earlier abbey (see immediately above); extant		51°19′53″N 1°19′03″E
Minster in Thanet Nunnery		Benedictine nuns founded c.750, built by Ermengitha, sister of Domneva destroyed? in raids by the Danes 980		
Minster in Thanet Priory		Benedictine monks founded c.670, granted to Domneva by King Egbert, her uncle; destroyed in raids by the Danes 980; dependent on St Augustine's, Canterbury; granted to St Augustine's by Cnut 1027;	St Mary Virgin	
Moatenden Priory		Trinitarian monks founded 1224 by Sir Michael de Ponynges; dissolved 1538; granted to Sir Antony Aucher 1538/9; site now occupied by a house named 'Moatenden Manor'	Mottenden Priory; Headcorn Priory; Muttiden Friary	51°11′16″N 0°36′05″E
New Romney Priory		Cistercian monks and nuns — double house alien house: grange dependent on Pontigny; founded 1264; dissolved c.1414	St John	50°59′09″N 0°56′23″E
New Romney Greyfriars		Franciscan Friars Minor, Conventual (under the Custody of London) founded before 1241; dissolved c.1287	Romney Greyfriars	50°58′43″N 0°56′00″E
Newington Priory		Benedictine nuns foundation unknown; transferred to Minster before 1087(?) secular canons from between 1154 and 1170; possible secular college, probably dissolved before 1179		or 51°20′42″N 0°39′18″E (alleged) or 51°05′27″N 1°06′42″E (possible)
Ospringe Crutched Friars		Crutched Friars founded before 1234; dissolved c.1470; became a secular hospital		
Patrixbourne Priory		Saxon minster Augustinian Canons Regular alien house: cell dependent on Beaulieu, Normandy; founded c.1200; dissolved 1409; restored 1849 by Mr Marshall of Canterbury and 1857 by Sir George Gilbert Scott; church in parochial use as the Parish Church of St Mary	St Mary	51°15′12″N 1°08′11″E
Reculver Abbey		Benedictine? monks founded 669, granted to Bass (Bassa), priest, by Egbert, King of Kent; destroyed in raids by the Danes; annexed to Canterbury 949 by King Eadred: abbot and Benedictines probably removed; under a dean until c.1030	Raculfe Abbey	51°22′46″N 1°11′59″E
Rochester Cathedral Priory^{+}		secular canons founded 604; dissolved 1080; episcopal diocesan cathedral founded 604; extant; Benedictine monks refounded 1080 by Æthelberht, King of Kent; dissolved 1540	The Cathedral and Priory Church of Saint Andrew, Rochester	51°23′20″N 0°30′12″E
St Mildred's Monastery		purported early Saxon monastery; probably a minster 8th century		
St Radegund's Abbey		Premonstratensian Canons daughter house of Prémontré; founded 1193; dissolved 1536; now in private ownership	Bradsole Abbey	51°07′55″N 1°15′03″E
Salmstone Priory		Benedictine monks residential grange and manor with chapel dependent on St Augustine's, Canterbury		
Sandwich Whitefriars		Carmellite Friars founded before 1268 (before c.1272) dissolved 1538		51°16′24″N 1°20′18″E
Sittingbourne Austin Friars		hospital, hermitage and chapel Silvester, the superior, apparently became a member of Austin Friars and received a grant to alienate the foundation; Austin Friars founded 1255; dissolved 1256?, Silvester apparently lapsed and the foundation ceased to be an Austin establishment	Shamele Austin Friars	
Shoreham Minster		Saxon minster founded before 700; present church on site, the Parish Church of SS Peter and Paul, built between 1230 and 1270 (during the reign of Edward III) on the site of an earlier church		51°19′59″N 0°11′04″E
Strood Hospital		hospital founded 1192-3; Benedictine monks founded 1330: required master to be a Benedictine monk; dissolved c.1402; continued as hospital to 1539	St Mary	
Strood Preceptory		Knights Templar (Note: Strood, Knights Templar — given as preceptory by J. C. Cox, Kent (1915), p.246; R. C. Fowler, — Victoria County History: A History of the County of Kent, Volume 2 (1926), p.175 states: "The manors of Dartford and Strood alsobelonged to the Templars, but it is doubtful whether preceptories were ever established there.")		
Sutton-at-Hone Preceptory^{+}		hospital founded before 1199; Knights Hospitaller granted 1214; preceptory established; lapsed before 1338 and farmed out (Note: Sutton-at-Hone — L. B. Larkin, The Knights Hospitallers in England, Camden Society (1857)); evidently revived shortly afterwards; dissolved 1358; remains in use as chapel and private residence; (NT)	St John's Jerusalem	51°24′39″N 0°14′25″E
Swingfield Preceptory		Sisters of the Order of St John of Jerusalem cell foundation unknown; transferred to Sisters of St John Priory, Buckland, Somerset c.1180; Knights Hospitaller founded before 1180; dissolved 1540	St John's Commandery; St John's Chapel	51°09′07″N 1°11′26″E
Temple Ewell Preceptory^{+}, Ewell		Knights Templar founded c.1185, benefactors William, brother of the King, and William Peverelle; dissolved 1308–1312; Knights Hospitaller refounded 1312; dissolved 1540; remains incorporated into parochial church		51°09′52″N 1°16′04″E
Thanington Nunnery		St James's hospital founded before 1164; apparently became nunnery or sisterhood before 1343, with regular priests or brethren to after 1415; possibly ceased to be a hospital, at least for a time; dissolved 1551; granted to Robert Dartnall 1551/2	Tanington Hospital	51°15′48″N 1°03′06″E
Throwley Priory^{#}		Benedictine monks alien house: cell dependent on St Bertin, St Omer; founded c.1150 by Hugh de Chilham and William de Ipra; dissolved 1414; granted to Syon Abbey; house named 'Glebe Cottage' built on site	Thurleigh Priory	51°16′00″N 0°51′23″E
Tonbridge Priory^{#}		Augustinian Canons Regular founded before 1192 (late in the reign of Henry II) by Richard de Clare, Earl of Hartford (confirmed by the Pope 1192); dissolved 8 February 1525; became ruinous between 1753 and 1780; site later occupied by a railway goods station	St Mary Magdalen	51°11′28″N 0°16′24″E
West Langdon Abbey^{#}		Premonstratensian Canons daughter house of Leiston; founded 1189 (1192) by William de Auberville; dissolved 1535; granted to the Archbishop of Canterbury 1538/9; site now occupied by 16th-century farmhouse currently in use as a holiday cottage	St Mary and St Thomas Martyr of Canterbury ____________________; Langdon Abbey	51°10′28″N 1°19′36″E
West Malling Abbey		nuns founded 688(?); no further reference until: Benedictine nuns transferred from Twickenham founded c.1090 (during the reign of William II) by Gundulf, Bishop of Rochester; transferred to Milford Haven; dissolved 1538; granted to Henry Cobham, alias Brook 1569/70	The Abbey Church of Saint Mary, West Malling	51°17′36″N 0°24′45″E
West Peckham Preceptory		Knights Hospitaller founded 1337 by Sir John Culpepper; dissolved 1540; granted to Sir Robert Southwell 1543/4; (Note: West Peckham —W. Dugdale, Monasticon Anglicanum & others list as preceptory; Archaeologia Cantiana states no preceptory there, rather Grand Master's camera on land granted by Elizabeth de Burgh in 1337. Tipton, Charles L. "The Origins of the Preceptory of West Peckham". Archaeologia Cantiana. 80: 92–97.)	West Peccham Hospital; West Peckham Camera	51°14′58″N 0°21′37″E

== See also ==
- List of monastic houses in England
