= List of monastic houses in Greater London =

Locations of monastic houses in Greater London
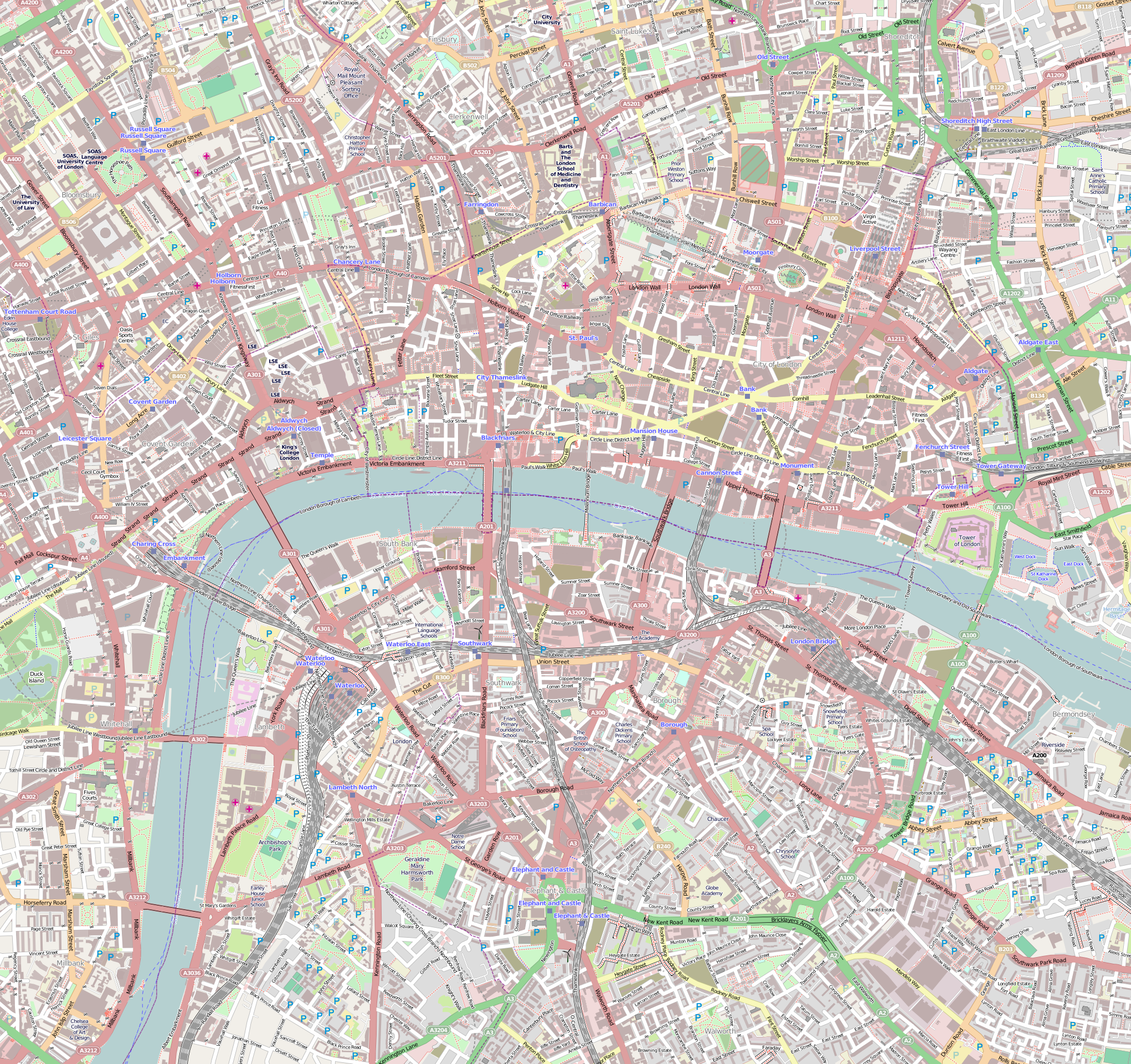
Locations of monastic houses in Central London

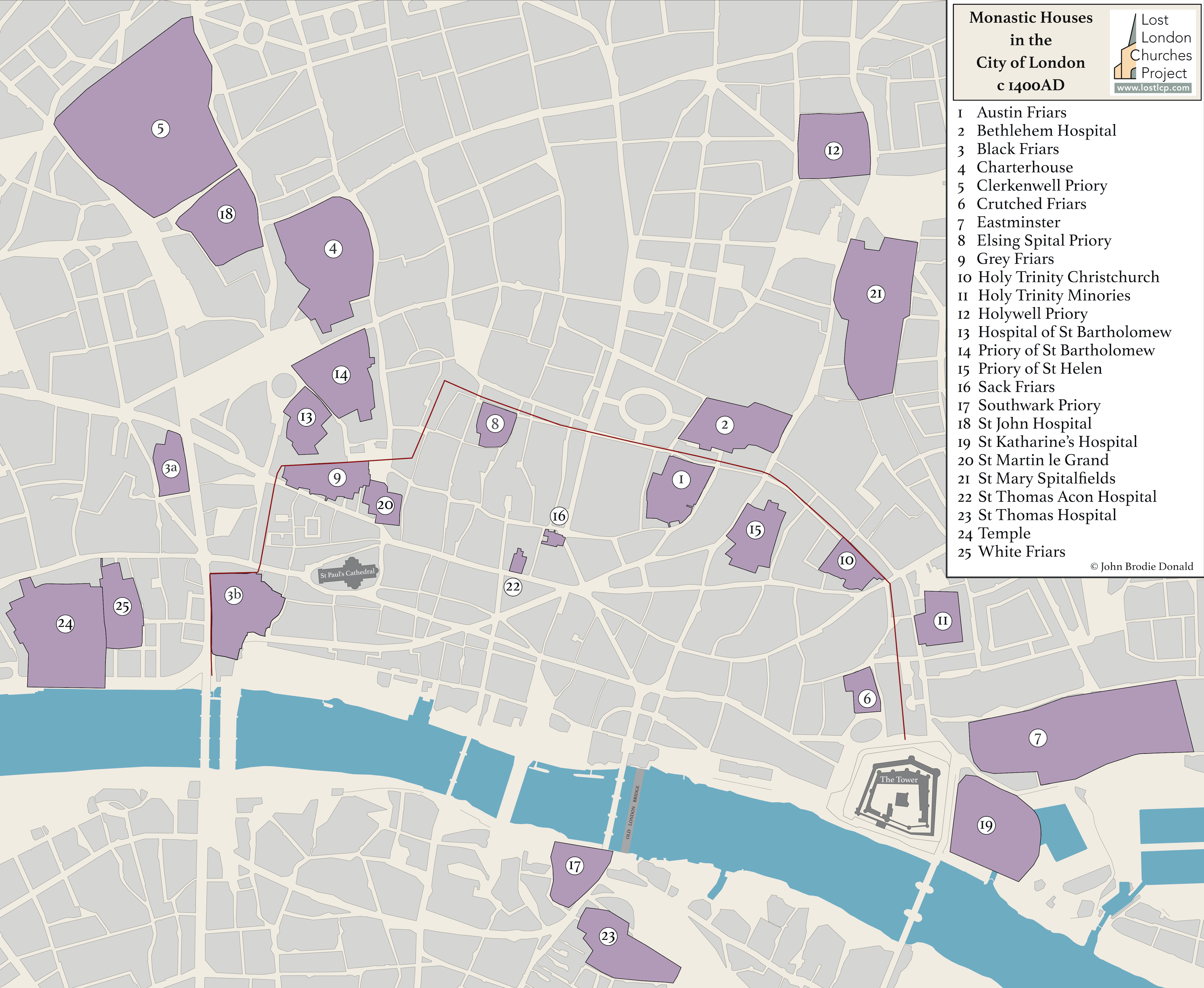
A map of the monastic houses in the City of London lost in the dissolution of the monasteries

The following is a list of the monastic houses in Greater London, England.

Alien houses are included, as are smaller establishments such as cells and notable monastic granges (particularly those with resident monks), and also camerae of the military orders of monks (Knights Templar and Knights Hospitaller). Monastic hospitals are included where they had the status or function of an abbey, priory, or preceptor/commandery.

Abbreviations and key

Status of remains
Symbol	Status
None	Ruins
*	Current monastic function
^{+}	Current non-monastic ecclesiastic function (including remains incorporated into later structure)
^	Current non-ecclesiastic function (including remains incorporated into later structure) or redundant intact structure
^{$}	Remains limited to earthworks etc.
^{#}	No identifiable trace of the monastic foundation remains
^{~}	Exact site of monastic foundation unknown
^{≈}	Identification ambiguous or confused

Locations with names in italics indicate possible duplication (misidentification with another location) or non-existent foundations (either erroneous reference or proposed foundation never implemented) or ecclesiastical establishments with a monastic name but lacking actual monastic connection.

Trusteeship
EH	English Heritage
LT	Landmark Trust
NT	National Trust

== Alphabetic listing ==
Foundation	Image	Communities and provenance	Formal name or dedication and alternative names	References and location
Aldgate Priory		Augustinian Canons Regular founded 1107-8 by Queen Maud; conventual church rebuilt 1339 onwards; dilapidated since 1532; dissolved 1534; granted to Sir Thomas Audley, Speaker of the House of Commons 1531/2; largely demolished thereafter	Christchurch, Aldgate	51°30′49″N 0°04′41″W
Aldgate Abbey		Franciscan nuns founded 1293-4 by Edmund, Earl of Lancaster, confirmed by his brother Edward I; dissolved March 1539;	The Abbey Church of the Grace of the Blessed Virgin Mary and Saint Francis, without Aldgate ____________________; The Minories, London; Holy Trinity, Minories	51°30′41″N 0°04′29″W
Barking Abbey		Benedictine? nuns and monks — double house founded c.666 by St Erkenwald son of Anna, King of the East Angles; destroyed in raids by the Danes 870; refounded 946-951; Benedictine nuns refounded 965-75 by King Edgar and St Dunstan dissolved 14 November 1539; granted to Edward, Lord Clinton 1551/2	St Mary St Mary and St Ethelburgha ____________________; Berking Abbey; Bedenham Abbey	51°32′8″N 0°4′31″E
Bentley Priory		Augustinian Canons Regular founded 1171 by Ranulf de Glanville; dissolved before 1532; house named 'The Priory' possibly built on site: formerly in use as a girls' school, then a hotel; now in ownership of R.A.F. Bentley Priory	The Priory Church of Saint Mary Magdalen, Bentley	51°37′12″N 0°20′16″W
Bermondsey Minster		Saxon monastery founded not earlier than under Pope Constantine I (708-715) (Note: Bermondsey, Saxon minster -'Vermundesei' given as a dependency of Medeshamstede (Peterborough) in 690: Walter de Gray Birch, (1885–93), Cartularium Saxonicum p.133) nothing further known about its history — possibly destroyed in raids by the Danes 9th century and succeeded by a new minster at Southwark		51°29′39″N 0°04′16″W
Bermondsey Abbey		Cluniac monks alien house: dependent on La Charité; priory founded 1082 by Alvin (Aylwin) Child, citizen of London (first monks arrived 1089); became denizen: independent from 1381; raised to abbey status 1399 by order of the Pope; dissolved 1 January 1538; granted to Sir Richard Southwell 1541/2; and demolished soon after	St Saviour	51°29′49″N 0°04′47″W
Brockley Abbey		Premonstratensian Canons daughter house of Sulby, Northamptonshire; founded before 1182 by Countess Juliana and her seneschal Michael of Thornham; dissolved 1199–1208; transferred to Bayham, (East) Sussex c.1180	The Abbey Church of the Blessed Virgin Mary, Brockley	51°27′55″N 0°01′47″W
Bromley-by-Bow Priory		Benedictine nuns founded before 1122; dissolved 1536	Bromley Priory; Stratford-at-Bow Priory; Stratford-by-Bow Priory	51°31′42″N 0°00′46″W
Clerkenwell Priory		Knights Hospitaller founded c.1144 (or c.1100 by Jordan Briset, Baron, and his wife Muriel (Note: Clerkenwell Preceptory — foundation according to Stow: Survey of London (1633); Jordan Briset died 1110; foundation as early as 1100 not possible)); dissolved 1540; the tower was blown up by Protector Somerset, much of the material used to build Somerset House	St John's Clerkenwell	51°31′21″N 0°06′11″W
Clerkenwell Priory (Augustinian)		Augustinian Canonesses founded 1100 by Robert, Priest, or c.1144 by Jordan FitzRalph (Briset); also given as Benedictine nuns dissolved c.1539; granted to Walter Hanley and John Williams, Knight 1545/6	The Priory Church of Saint Mary de Fonte The Priory Church of Saint Mary of the Assumption	51°31′26″N 0°06′24″W
Ealing Abbey *		Benedictine monks — from Downside, Somerset founded 1897; priory 1916; raised to abbey status 1955; extant	The Abbey Church of Saint Benedict, Ealing	51°31′11″N 0°18′32″W
Eastminster Abbey		Cistercian monks daughter house of Beaulieu, Hampshire; founded 20 March 1350 by Edward III; dissolved 1538; granted to Sir Arthur Darcy 1542/3	New Abbey; The Abbey of St Mary de Graciis; St Mary Graces Abbey	51°30′33″N 0°04′19″W
Elsing Spital Priory		secular college (community founded at London within Cripplegate before 1329) transferred here: founded 1329 by William Elsing; nuns conventual hospital founded 1331; chapel for priory and hospital built 1332; Augustinian Canons Regular conventual hospital; founded 1340; granted to John Williams, Master of the King's Jewels 1539/40; destroyed by fire 24 December 1539/40; priory church in parochial use from dissolution; demolished 1923	Elsing Spittle Priory; Priory and Hospital of St Mary-within-Cripplegate; Church of St Alphage, London Wall	51°31′03″N 0°05′34″W
Feltham Priory		Anglican Benedictine nuns founded 24 June 1868 by Father Ignatius; transferred to Twickenham	SS Mary and Scholastica ____________________; Feltham Nunnery	
Greenwich Blackfriars		Dominican Friars founded 1376 by Edward III and Sir John Norbury; dissolved; refounded by Queen Mary; dissolved by Elizabeth I		
Greenwich Greyfriars ^{#}		Observant Franciscan Friars founded 1482: permission granted by the Pope to Edward IV, established 1485; suppressed for rejection of papal authority 1534; Franciscan Friars Minor, Conventual (under the Custody of London) refounded 1534; dissolved 1538; Observant Franciscan Friars refounded 1555; dissolved 1559; demolished; north-west wing of hospital currently stands on site		51°28′59″N 0°00′23″W
Haliwell Priory		Augustinian Canonesses founded before 1127 (before 1150(?)) by Robert fitz Gelran (Fitzmore), canon of St Paul's; benefacted by Richard Belmeis, Bishop of London; also given as Benedictine nuns dissolved c.1539; granted to William Webb 1544/5	The Priory Church of Saint John the Baptist, Holywell ____________________; Holywell Priory; Holywell Nunnery, Shorditch	51°31′26″N 0°04′44″W
Hampton Cell then, later, Hampton Preceptory		Sisters of St John of Jerusalem founded before 1180; transferred to Sisters of St John Priory, Buckland, Somerset c.1180		
Hampton Cell then, later, Hampton Preceptory		Knights Hospitaller founded before 1180(?); manor procured by Hospitallers 1237; referred to as a camera 1338 (Note: Hampton Preceptory — status given as camera: C. S. Larking, The Knights Hospitallers in England, (1857), (pp.127-8);); later guest house; leased out 1505; dissolved 1338; lands were leased to the royal courtier Giles Daubeney 1494, who built private house; demolished 1514; 99-year lease obtained from the Hospitallers by Wolsey June 1514; Hampton Court built on site		51°24′13″N 0°20′16″W
Harmondsworth Priory		Benedictine monks alien house: cell(?) dependent on St-Catherine-du-Mont, Rouen; founded between 1066 and 1087 (during the reign of William the Conqueror); dissolved ?before 1391; granted to Winchester College; granted to Sir William Paget 1547/8		51°29′21″N 0°28′53″W
Hornchurch Priory ^{+}		Augustinian Canons alien house: cell dependent on the Hospital of St Nicholas and St Bernard in Montjoux, Savoy; founded 1158/9 by Henry II; dissolved November 1390; granted to New College, Oxford 1391;	Saint Nicholas and Saint Bernard	51°33′41″N 0°13′33″E
Hounslow Priory		hospital founded before 1200; Trinitarians founded after 1224 (possibly 1252); dissolved 1538; granted to William, Lord Windsor; Parish Church of the Holy Trinity built on site 1828	The Holy Trinity ____________________; Hounslow Friary	51°28′07″N 0°21′50″W
Kilburn Priory		anchoresses cell founded before/c.1130; Benedictine nuns founded 1139 (during the reign of Henry I) by the Convent of Westminster; possibly Augustinian Canonesses during existence — but began and ended as Benedictine; dissolved 1537 (1536); granted to John, Earl of Warwick 1547/8	Kylburn Nunnery	51°32′28″N 0°11′56″W
Lesnes Abbey		Augustinian Canons Regular — Arrouasian founded June 1178 by Richard de Luci, Justiciar of England; dissolved 1525; granted to Cardinal Wolsey's college at Oxford; granted to Sir Ralph Sadler 1536/7	The Abbey Church of Saint Thomas the Martyr, Lesnes ____________________; Westwood Abbey	51°29′20″N 0°07′44″E
Lewisham Priory		Benedictine monks alien house: cell dependent on St Peter, Gent; founded 11 September 918: granted by Elstrudis, Countess of Flanders and her sons Arnulf and Adelulf, confirmed by King Edgar August 964; confiscated and destroyed; restored 1044 by Edward the Confessor; dissolved 1414; granted to the Carthusians at Sheen by Henry V 1415		51°27′26″N 0°00′54″W
London Areno Friars		Friars of St Mary de Areno founded 1267 by William Arnand, a knight of Henry III; ceased 1317 with the death of the last brother, Hugh of York (appears to be the same establishment as the London Pied Friars and Westminster Pied Friars)		
London Austin Friars		Augustinian Friars founded 1253 by Humphrey Bohun, Earl of Hereford and Essex; dissolved 1538; granted to John a Losco 1550, who founded preaching house for congregation of Walloon refugees; nave used as church, quire, transepts and tower demolished 1600; church destroyed by fire 1862; rebuilt 1863; bombed in 1940 during World War II; rebuilt 1950-6 as the Dutch Church, Austin Friars		51°30′56″N 0°05′08″W
London Charterhouse ^, Charterhouse Square		secular college intended 1348; chapel built; founded by Sir Walter de Manny; Carthusian monks founded 1371; dissolved 1537; granted to Sir Thomas Audley 1544/5; almshouse and Charterhouse School founded by Thomas Sutton on the site 1622; which transferred to Godalming 1872; and that part of the site is now research facilities for the Barts and The London medical school	House of the Salutation of the Mother of God	51°31′17″N 0°05′59″W
London, Cornhill Greyfriars		Franciscan Friars Minor, Conventual (under the Custody of London) founded 1224: hired a house here after living for a number of days with the Dominicans at Holborn upon arriving in London; transferred to Newgate 1225		51°30′57″N 0°05′58″W
London Crutched Friars		Crutched Friars founded before 1269; dissolved 1538		51°30′39″N 0°04′42″W
London, Friars of the Sack, Aldersgate		Friars of the Sack founded 1257; transferred to Lothbury (see immediately below) before 1271–2		
London, Friars of the Sack, Lothbury		Friars of the Sack (community founded at Aldersgate (see immediately above) 1257); transferred here before 1271–1; abandoned 1305; chapel became a chantry		
London, Holborn Blackfriars		Dominican Friars founded before 1224 (probably 1221); transferred to Ludgate (see immediately below) after 1275	Monumenta Conventus Londinensis	
London, Ludgate Blackfriars		Dominican Friars (community founded at Holborn (see immediately above) before 1224 (probably 1221)) transferred here after 1275; dissolved 12 November 1538; briefly refounded under Queen Mary at Smithfield		51°30′44″N 0°06′11″W
London, Newgate Greyfriars		Franciscan Friars (under the Custody of London) (community founded at Cornhill 1224); transferred here 1225: John Iwyn, citizen of London, allowed them the use of land and property; school founded church completed 1327; dissolved 12 November 1538; granted to the City of London 1546/7; reused as Christ Hospital		51°30′58″N 0°06′00″W
New Temple, London ^{+}		Knights Templar (community founded at earlier site (see immediately below) 1121); transferred here 1161; dissolved 1308–12; Knights Hospitaller transferred 1324; part leased to lawyers for use as a hostel; dissolved after 1540; leased to the Benches of the Inner and Middle Temple by James I 1609; restorations 19th century; church severely damaged in World War II in 1941; restored 1947–57		51°30′48″N 0°06′38″W
London, Old Temple		Knights Templar founded 1121; transferred to new site (see immediately above) 1161	Camden Preceptory	51°31′04″N 0°06′45″W
London Pied Friars		Pied Friars (appears to be the same as London Areno Friars, and Westminster Pied Friars)		
London — St Dominic's Priory		Dominican Friars opened 1867, church completed 1882	The Priory of Our Holy Father St Dominic; Our Lady of the Rosary and Saint Dominic	51°33′03″N 0°09′26″W
London — St Helen's, Bishopsgate ^{+}		Benedictine nuns founded before 1216 by William fitz William(s), goldsmith; dissolved 25 November 1538; granted to Sir Richard Cromwell 1541/2; conventual buildings were acquired by the Leathersellers' Company 1543; conventual church now in parochial use as the Parish Church of St Helen, Bishopsgate; church restored 18th, 19th, 20th century; damaged by IRA bomb 10 April 1992; restored 1995–7	St Helen	51°30′53″N 0°04′54″W
London — St James Monkswell Chantry		Carthusian monks house or cell of the Abbot of Garendon; chantry(?), daughter house of Garendon, Leicestershire; founded 1341		
London, St Mary Spital		Augustinian Canons Regular conventual hospital or priory founded 1197 by Walter Fitz Ealdred land granted by Walter Brunus, citizen of London, and his wife Roisia; granted to Stephen Vaughan who made his home in the precinct	St Mary the Virgin ____________________; St Mary Spittle, without Bishopsgate; Domus Dei	
London, St Mary of Bethlehem Friary		Augustinian Canons Regular — Order of Bethlehem conventual hospital; St Mary of Bethlehem Sisters founded 1247, land granted by Simon Fitz Mary to Godfrey, bishop of Bethlehem to founded a house of canons, brothers and sisters; hospital became attached to the founded before 1329; dissolved; hospital but was moved to Moorfields 1675-6 and then to the South side of the Thames in 1814 (see Bethlem Royal Hospital)	The Bethlehem Hospital; Bedlam	51°31′03″N 0°05′12″W
London, St Thomas of Acon Hospital		Augustinian Canons Regular conventual hospital		
London, Smithfield Blackfriars		Dominican Friars briefly founded under Queen Mary		
London Whitefriars		Carmelite Friars founded 1247 by Sir Richard Grey; church built 1253; rebuilt mid-14th century dissolved 1538; granted to Richard Moresyne and William Butts 1540/1; frater, library and kitchen granted to the King's Armourer; Michael Drayton and Thomas Woodford, nephew of the playwright Thomas Lodge, converted the former refectory for use as The Whitefriars Theatre 1608 (or possibly 1606); theatre closed 1629		51°30′47″N 0°06′29″W
London within Cripplegate (?)Priory		nuns(?)/conventual hospital founded before 1329; became dilapidated; abandoned 1329; transferred to Elsing		
Merton Priory		Augustinian Canons Regular founded 1114 (1117) by Gilbert Norman, Sheriff of Surrey; dissolved 1538; Merton Abbey Station built on site 19th century; site now occupied by shopping centre with purpose-built basement from which remains are visible	The Priory Church of Saint Mary, Merton The Priory Church of Saint Mary of Merton ____________________; Merton Abbey St Mary's Priory; St Mary of Merton	51°24′51″N 0°10′55″W
Moor Hall Preceptory		Knights Hospitaller founded apparently c.1176, granted by Beatrice de Bollers, widdow; apparently became a camera by 1338; dissolved 1338; chapel demolished 1960	Harefield Preceptory; Harefield Camera; Moor Hall Camera	51°35′21″N 0°29′00″W
Richmond Greyfriars ^{#}		Observant Franciscan Friars founded 1499 or 1500; dissolved 1534; probably passed to the Austin Friars; probably Augustinian Friars refounded 1534; dissolved 1536?	Richmond Austin Friars (1534-6); Sheen Friary	51°27′37″N 0°18′28″W
Ruislip Priory		Benedictine monks alien house: dependent Bec-Hellouin; founded (during the reign of William the Conqueror) land granted by Ernulph de Heding; conventual until after? c.1250; parcel of Ogbourne, Wiltshire 1291; dissolved 1404; granted to Ralph Sadler 1540/1; Manor Farm House built 16th century	Riselipp Priory	51°34′44″N 0°25′38″W
St Bartholomew's Priory ^{+}		Augustinian Canons Regular founded 1123, land obtained from Henry I by Roahere, formerly a minstrel at court; became a priory with a separate hospital; dissolved October 1539; granted to Lord Rich 1558/9; now St Bartholomew's Hospital, and priory church in parochial use	The Priory Church of St Bartholomew-the-Great, Smithfield	51°31′7.92″N 0°05′58.77″W
Sheen Priory		Carthusian monks founded c.1414 by Henry V; dissolved 1539; granted to Edward, Earl of Hertford 1540/1; restored 26 January 1557 by Queen Mary, under Maurice Chauncy of London (who became prior) dissolved by Elizabeth I	The Priory Church of Jesus of Bethlehem ____________________; Richmond Priory; Shene Priory	
Sheen Whitefriars		Carmelite Friars founded c.1315; dissolved c.1318; community transferred by Edward II to his manor called the 'Palace of Beaufort' at Oxford 1317–8		
Southwark Cathedral Priory ^{+}		Saxon minster church pre-1066, allegedly built on the remains of an earlier nunnery; probably founded as a burghal minster either late in the reign of Alfred or earlier in the reign of Edward the Elder; probably succeeded the minster at Bermondsey; Augustinian Canons Regular (re)founded 1106; largely destroyed by fire 1212; subsequently rebuilt; dissolved 27 October 1539; granted to Sir Antony Brown 1544/5; episcopal diocesan cathedral founded 1 May 1905: see created for new diocese separated from Rochester; extant	The Priory Church of Saint Mary Overie, Southwark	51°30′22″N 0°05′23″W
Stratford Langthorne Abbey		Savignac monks founded 25 July 1135; Cistercian monks orders merged 17 September 1147; dissolved 1538	The Abbey Church of Saint Mary, Stratford Langthorne ____________________; West Ham Abbey	51°32′00″N 00°00′00″W
Stratford Friary *		Franciscan Friars Minor extant		51°32′40″N 0°00′14″E
Syon Abbey		Bridgetine nuns founded 1431; dissolved 1539; 18th century house acquired	Charterhouse at Sheen	51°28′36″N 0°18′45″W
Tooting Priory		Benedictine monks alien house: dependent on Bec-Hellouin; manor held by Bec-Hellouin at the Domesday Survey; founded before 1086: granted by Richard de Tonbridge, Lord of Clare; dissolved before 1315(?); parcel of Ogbourne 1315; dissolved by Henry V 1414 and granted to his brother John, Duke of Bedford; on his death 14 September 1436, it passed to Henry VI who granted to John Ardern for ten years; granted to Eton College 1440	Tooting Bec Priory	51°25′56″N 0°08′44″W
Twickenham Abbey		Bridgetine nuns founded 1415 by Henry V (who laid the first stone 22 February and signed charter 3 March); transferred to Syon 1431		
Twickenham Priory		Anglican Benedictine nuns transferred from Feltham; transferred to West Malling, Kent		
Upminster		Saxon 'minster'; possibly on site now occupied by the Parish Church of St Laurence		51°33′21″N 0°14′52″E (possible)
Westminster Abbey ^{+}		legendary very early foundation (Note: Westminster Abbey — AD184 foundation according to 15th century monk, converted to a temple of Apollo under Diocletian); possibly monastery founded c.616 (probably just a chapel or church) by Sebert on instruction by Bishop Mellitus; some evidence of monastery, possibly secular, founded before 785, destroyed? in raids by the Danes 871-2?, restored Benedictine monks founded c.960 (959) (Note: Westminster Abbey — or less reliably c.965, given by William of Malmesbury); dissolved 16 January 1540; episcopal cathedral 1540–1550; restored 1556; dissolved 1559; collegiate church 1560; now in use as a royal peculiar	The Abbey Church of Saint Peter in Westminster	51°29′57″N 0°07′39″W
Westminster Pied Friars		Pied Friars (appears to be the same establishment as the London Areno Friars and London Pied Friars)		51°30′34″N 0°07′20″W
Woodford Green Friary *		Franciscan Friars Minor extant	Friary and Parish of St Thomas of Canterbury	51°36′55″N 0°01′28″E

== See also ==
- List of monastic houses in England
