= Heston =

Coordinates: 51.4852°N 0.3788°W

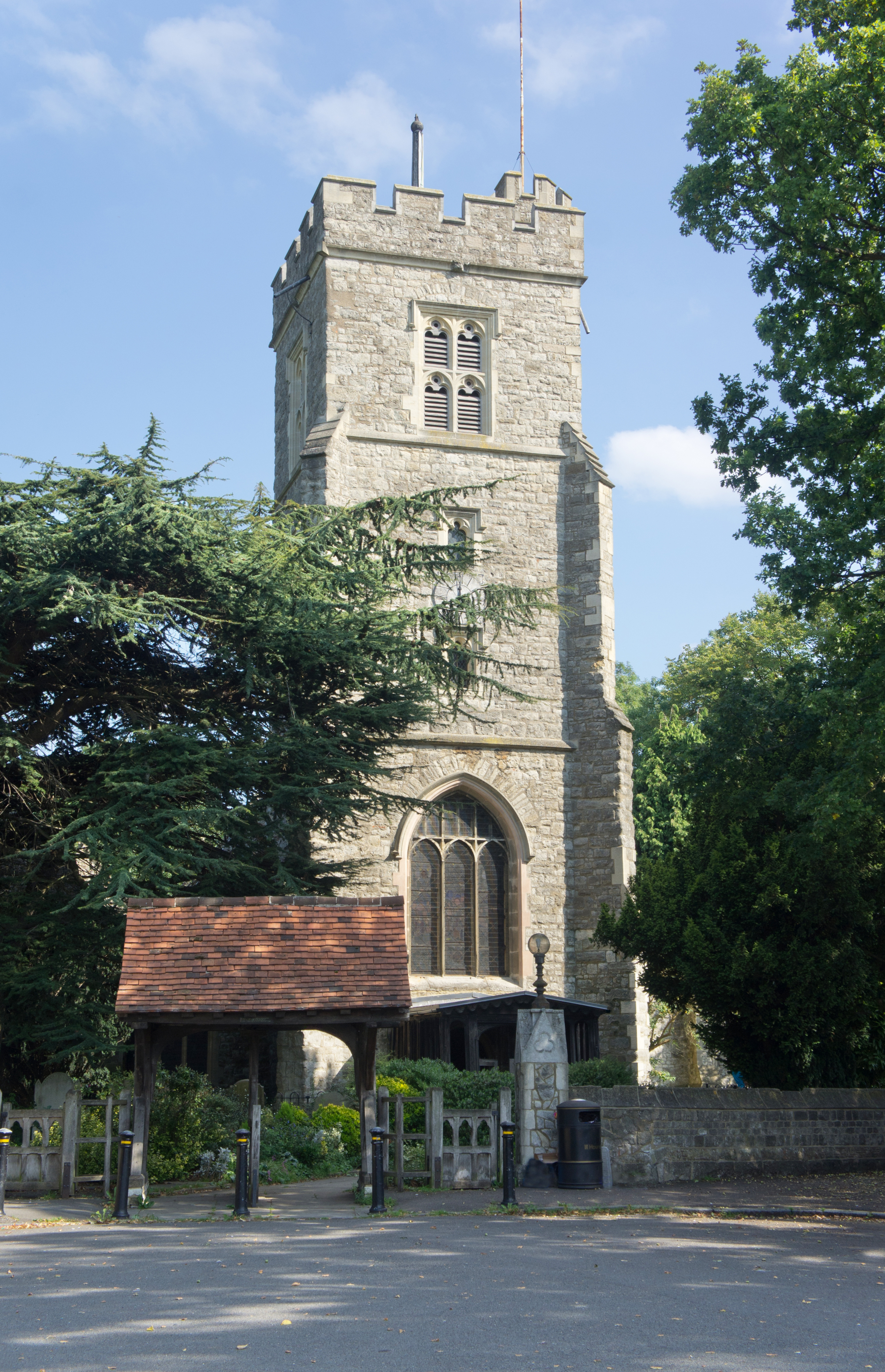
- St Leonard's Church

- Location within Greater London
- Area: 7.51 km^{2} (2.90 sq mi)
- Population: 37,045 (Heston Central, Heston East, Heston West wards 2011)
  - Density: 4,933/km^{2} (12,780/sq mi)
- OS grid reference: TQ1277
- London borough: Hounslow
- Ceremonial county: Greater London
- Region: London
- Country: England
- Sovereign state: United Kingdom
- Post town: HOUNSLOW
- Postcode district: TW5
- Dialling code: 020
- Police: Metropolitan
- Fire: London
- Ambulance: London
- UK Parliament: Feltham and Heston
- London Assembly: South West

Heston is a suburban area and part of the Hounslow district in the London Borough of Hounslow. The residential settlement covers a slightly smaller area than its predecessor farming village, 10.8 miles (17.4 km) west south-west of Charing Cross and adjoins the M4 motorway but has no junction with it; Heston also adjoins the Great West Road, a dual carriageway, mostly west of the "Golden Mile" headquarters section of it. Heston is, historically, in Middlesex.

== History ==
The village of Heston is north of Hounslow, and has been settled since Saxon times. It is first recorded as having a priest in the 7th century, though the present Anglican parish church dates to the 14th century. A charter of Henry II gives the name as Hestune, meaning "enclosed settlement", which is justified by its location in what was the Warren of Staines, between the ancient Roman road to Bath, and the Uxbridge Road to Oxford. Another suggested etymology is Anglo-Saxon Hǣs-tūn = "brushwood farm or settlement".

Before 1229, Heston was part of the parish of Gistleworth (Isleworth) before being taken by Henry III, who subsequently granted it to the Earl of Cornwall. It covered until the late 19th-century creation of Hounslow from outlying parts of two adjoining parishes, 3,823 acres (15.47 km^{2}). The close association pre-dates the town of Hounslow, when that was simply Hounslow Priory, the two parishes had long been associated: the medieval manor of Isleworth covered all of that parish and this. After Henry III died in 1316, Heston was owned by the Crown, and later by the wardens of St Giles' Hospital, until it was surrendered to Henry VIII during the dissolution of the monasteries. Elizabeth I granted Heston to Sir Thomas Gresham, and, after eating some bread made from locally grown wheat, insisted on a supply for her own personal use.

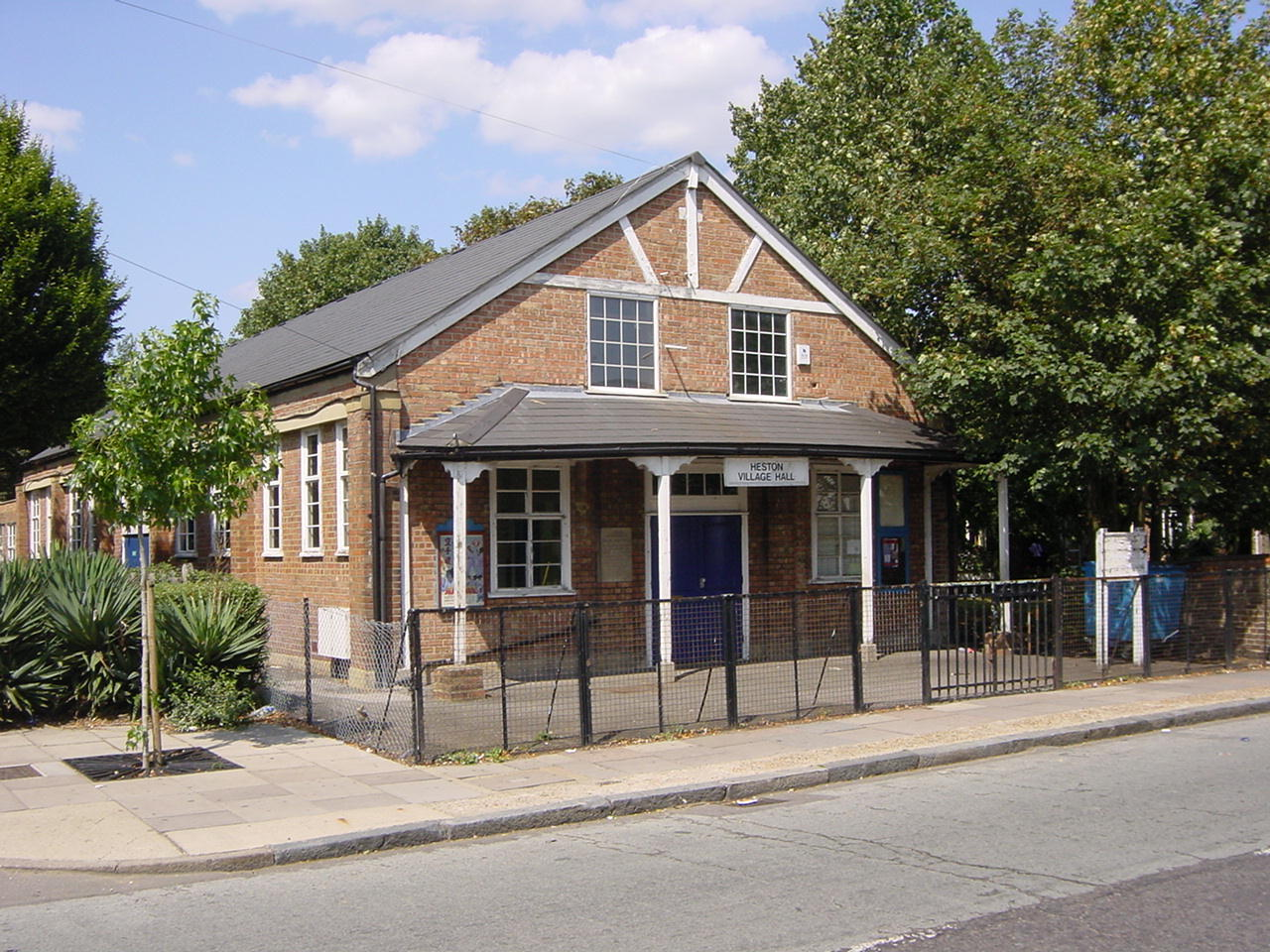
Heston Village Hall

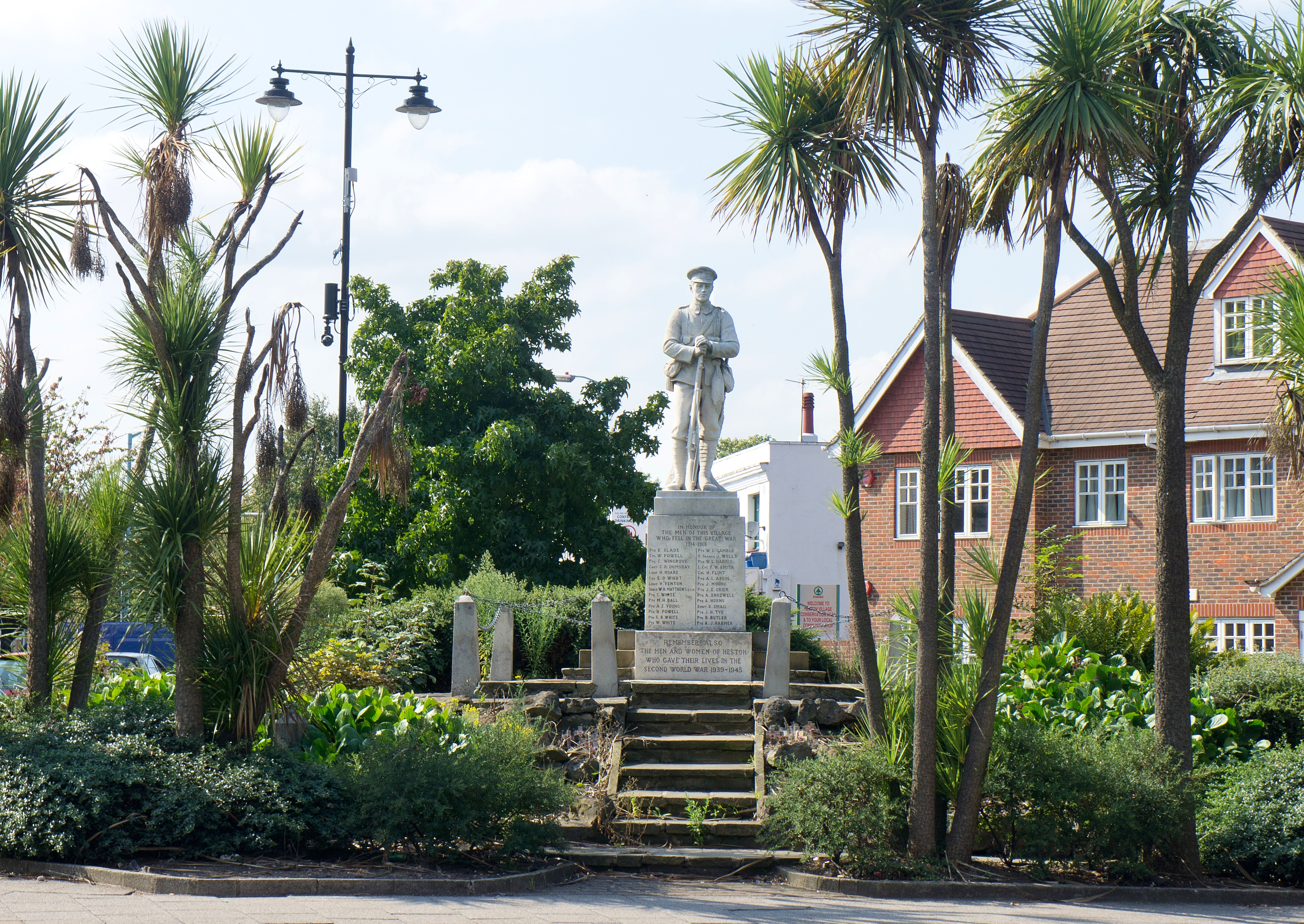
Heston War Memorial

The separation from Isleworth in the 14th century gave the locals a sense of independence from the inhabitants and feudal lords of Isleworth, with whom they frequently quarrelled. The practice of "beating the bounds" was practised annually when the inhabitants went in procession around the parish boundaries, to show locals the extent of their lands. A contemporary account of such a procession describes an occasion when the parishioners of Heston came across some from Isleworth, and the ensuing "quarrel" saw men from Heston throwing the others across a ditch.

A single board of health for the parishes mentioned was formed in 1875 and a very large civil parish in 1927. The Great West Road was completed in 1925, forming the southern border with Hounslow and the farming and market garden land around the village was snapped up for industry and housing developments. The southern part of Heston up to the Great West Road, Sutton (also known as 'The Deans'), was previously a small hamlet subsequently built up as part of the suburb; this name appearing in some road names and other local features. A Roman Catholic parish church was also built for Heston in the 20th century.

=== Heston Aerodrome ===
Heston Aerodrome was operational between 1929 and 1947. In September 1938, the British Prime Minister, Neville Chamberlain, flew from Heston to Germany three times in two weeks for talks with Adolf Hitler, and he returned to Heston from the Munich Conference with the paper referred to in his later "Peace for our time" speech from 10 Downing Street.

Housing and industrial estates have been built on some of the area that was Heston Aerodrome, and the M4 motorway with its large service area (Heston services) cuts across the former aerodrome site east–west, but a substantial area to the north of the M4 is host to the Airlinks 18-hole golf course. Many of the roads in the area have aviation-related names: Alcock Road (Alcock and Brown), Brabazon Road (Lord Brabazon), Bleriot Road (Louis Blériot), Cobham Road (Sir Alan Cobham), De Havilland Road (Geoffrey de Havilland), Norman Crescent (Nigel Norman), Phoenix Way (Heston Phoenix), Sopwith Road (Thomas Sopwith), Spitfire Way (Supermarine Spitfire), Whittle Road (Frank Whittle), and Wright Road (the Wright brothers).

== Politics ==
Heston is part of the Feltham and Heston constituency for elections to the House of Commons of the United Kingdom.

Heston is covered by three wards for elections to Hounslow London Borough Council; Heston Central, Heston East and Heston West.

On 1 April 1927 the civil parish was abolished and merged with Isleworth to form Heston and Isleworth. At the 1921 census (the last before the abolition of the parish), Heston had a population of 16,756.

== Schools ==
There are six primary schools in Heston: Edison Primary School, Berkeley, The Rosary Catholic School, Westbrook Primary, Springwell School, Heston Primary School. Heston Community School is a secondary school with a sixth form.

== Community ==
There are three active community groups in Heston: Heston Residents Association, formed in 1918, Heston West Big Local, formed in 2015 and Heston Action Group, formed in 2018.

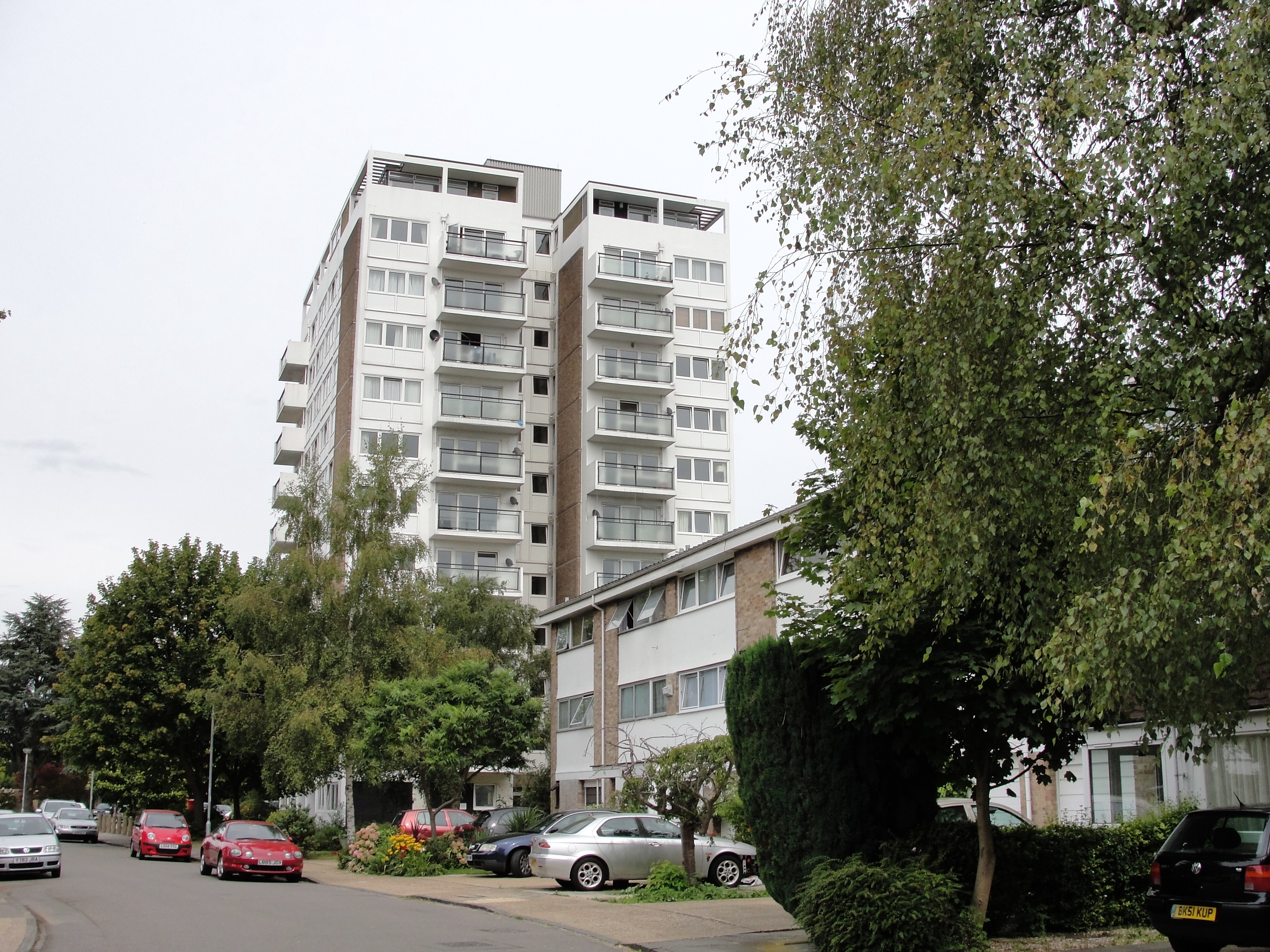
Flats in Heston

== Transport ==
=== London Underground ===
Hounslow West tube station is just outside the area's southern boundary and is (1.1 miles (1.8 km) from the village hall). To the East, the nearest underground station is Osterley tube station (1.3 miles (2.1 km) from the village hall)

=== East–West roads ===
The A4 Great West Road, having left the historic A315 on the Chiswick–Brentford border, forms the southern border of Heston and then reaches Henlys Roundabout by Hounslow West from which two routes leave. A WNW route passes Heathrow Airport Terminals 1–3 and 5 as the Bath Road and a WSW route, the A30, passes Terminal 4, bypasses Staines and reaches the M25; the remainder is for the most part a minor route to Land's End, Cornwall.

The M4 motorway is 1/2 mile (800 m) north; its nearest junction is J3, accessed from Hyde Lane or Southall Lane, crossing over the M4 motorway into North Hyde and then turning left (west) to reach the A312, The Parkway, 220 yards (200 m) north of the junction.

=== North–South roads ===
The north–south A312, The Parkway, to the west of Heston leads south to Feltham and Hampton or north to Harrow passing Waggoners' Roundabout (WNW of Henlys Roundabout in Hounslow West), Hayes, Yeading and Northolt.

Three minor roads converge on Heston from the A315 in parts of Hounslow, the A3063, A3005 and B363. The single road re-divides just north in Norwood Green into a northwest road to Southall (the A3005) and into the A4127 that passes by Hanwell, briefly using the A4020 west before bypassing Dormers Wells, passing Greenford to reach Sudbury, the town immediately to the west of Wembley and North Wembley.

For longer journeys north, the M4 then M25 provide the best routes. For longer journeys south, Hanworth Road in Hounslow leads to the A316 which becomes the M3 motorway.

== Notable people ==
- Oarsman Don Allum (1937–1992), first man to row the Atlantic Ocean in both directions, lived in Heston.
- Guitarist Jimmy Page, of rock band Led Zeppelin, was born in Heston.
- Guitarist Ritchie Blackmore, of rock bands Deep Purple and Rainbow, grew up in Heston.
- Anthony Collins (1676–1729), philosopher friend of John Locke, was born in Heston.
- Composer Ernest John Moeran (1894–1950) was born in Heston.
- Horticulturist Ellen Willmott (1858–1934) was born in Heston.
- Lynwood Palmer (1868–1941) painter of race-horses lived in Heston between 1911 and 1941.
- Motorcycle racer Mike Hailwood had a bachelor flat in Heston, where he kept his high-powered sports cars.
- Actor Sanjeev Bhaskar grew up in a flat above the shops on Vicarage Farm Road.

== Gallery ==
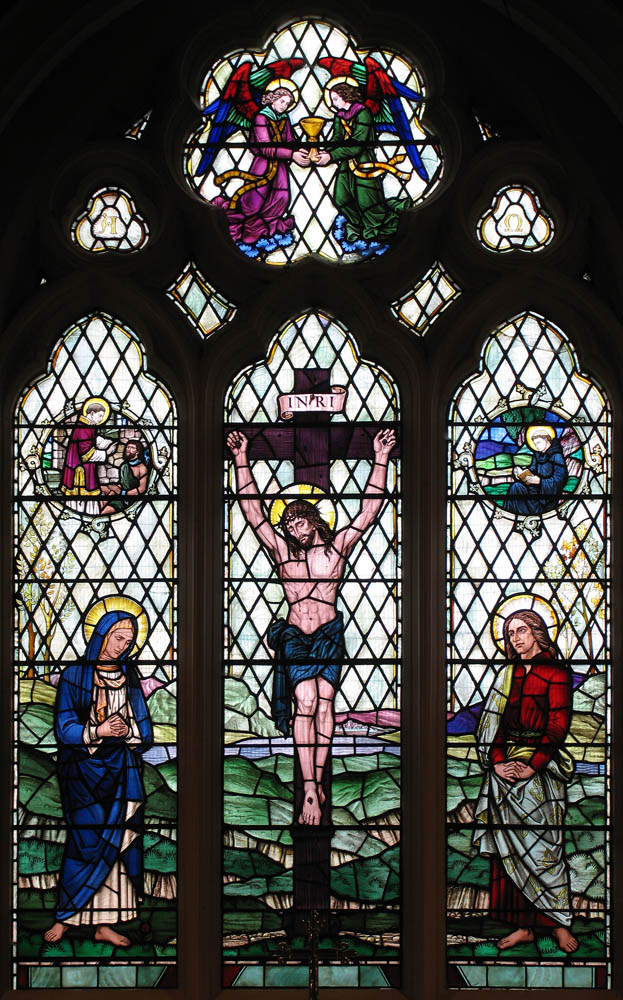
St Leonard's Church
Main window: the crucifixion

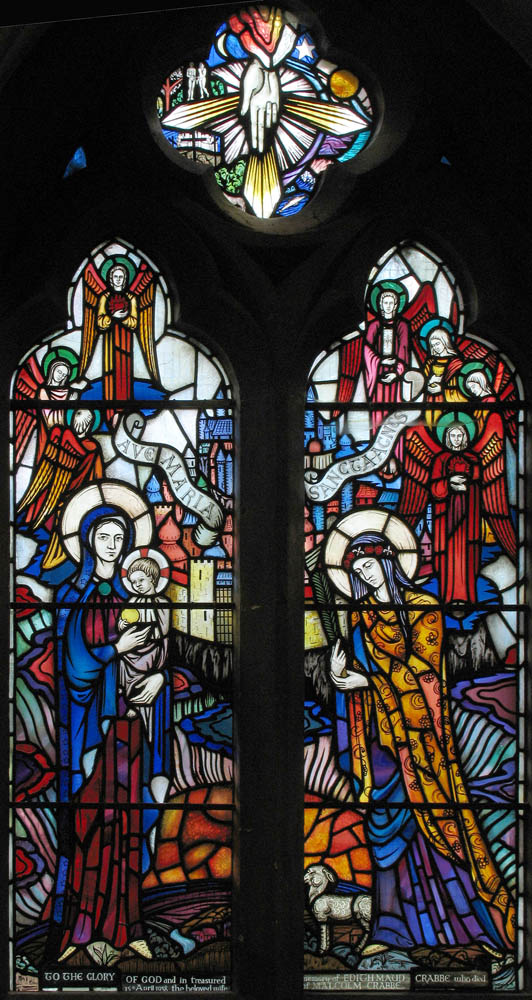
St Leonard's Church
Madonna and Child

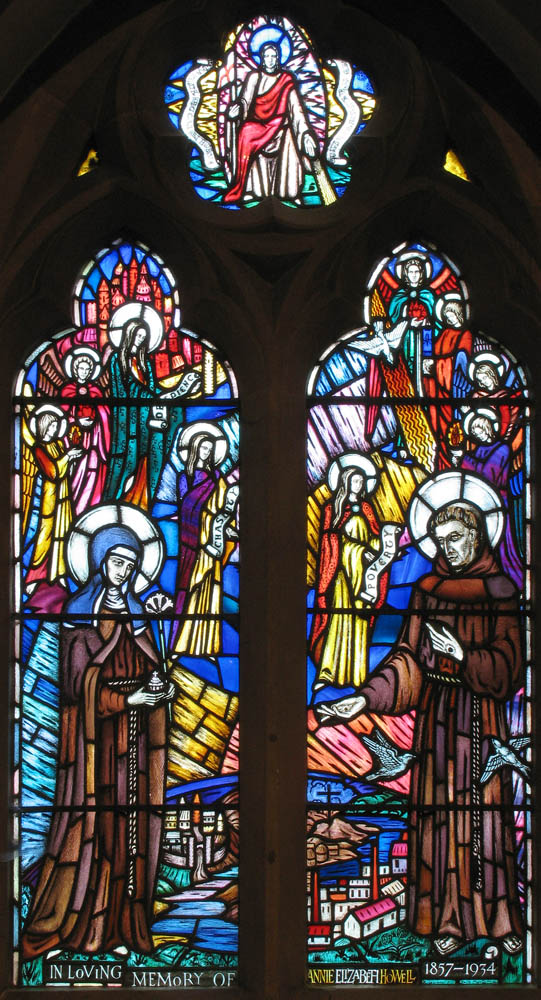
St Leonard's Church
St Clare and St Francis

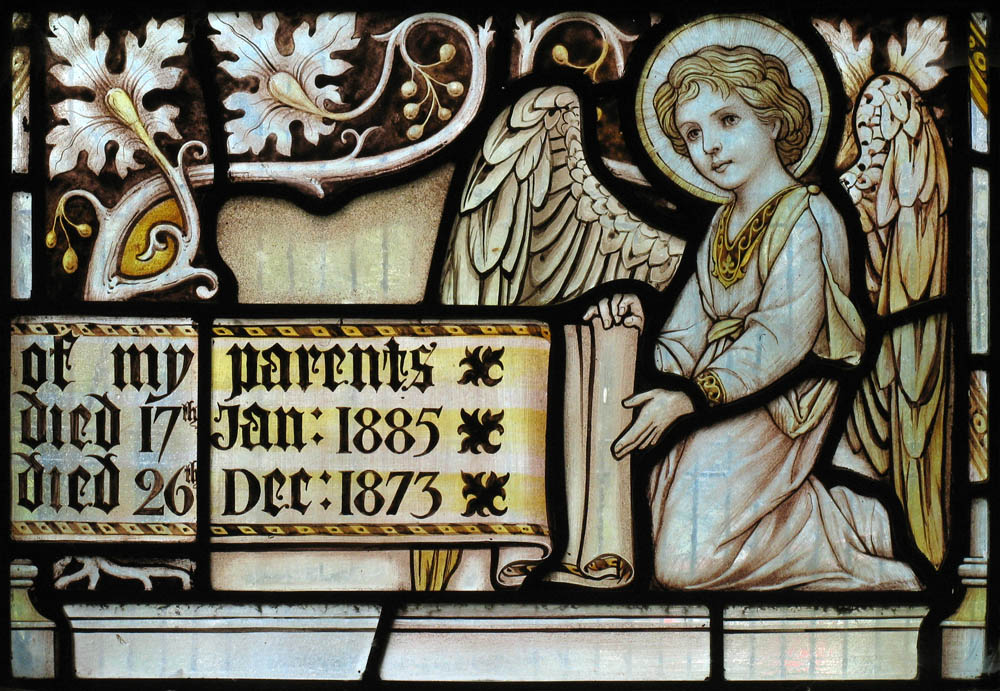
St Leonard's Church
Inscribed window

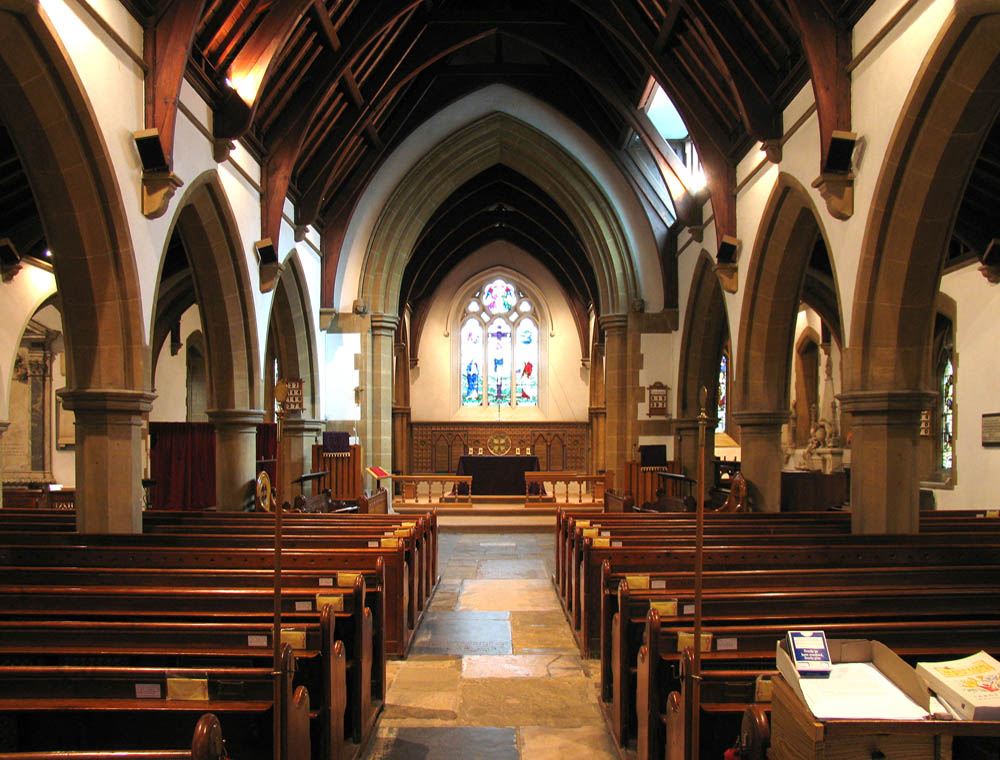
St Leonard's Church
Interior

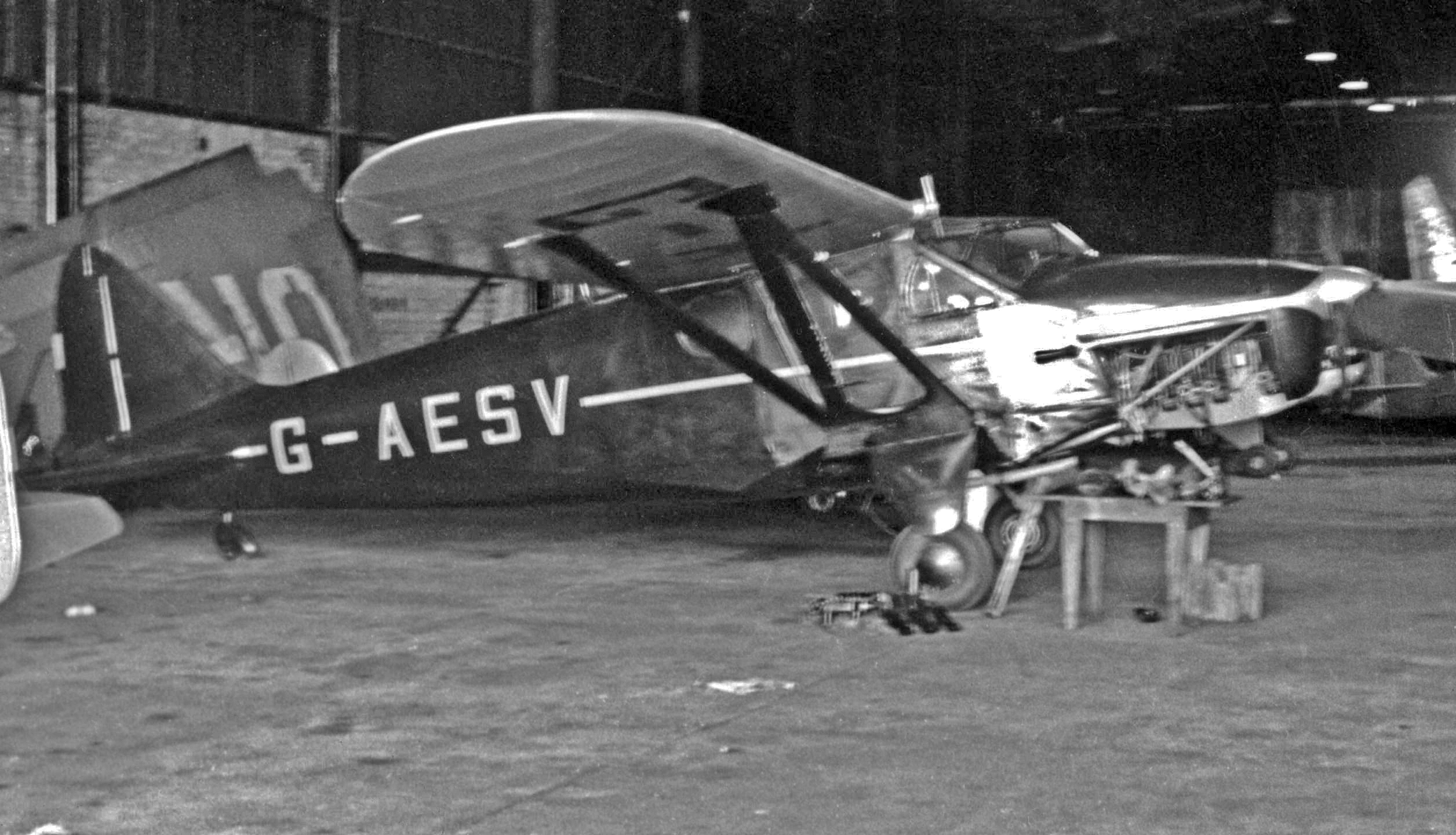
Heston Type 1 Phoenix II G-AESV at Elstree Aerodrome

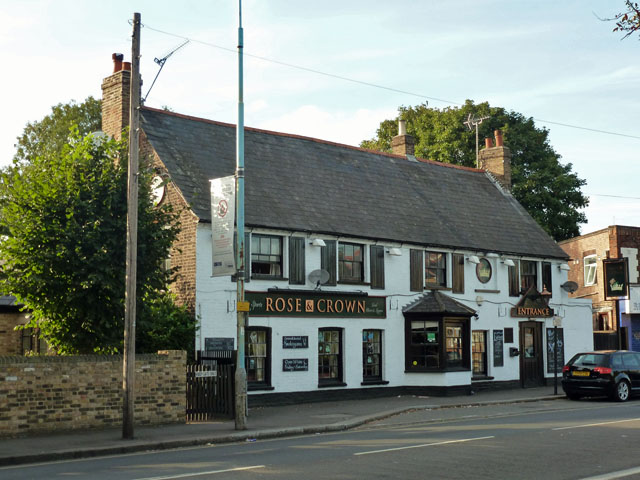
The Rose & Crown pub

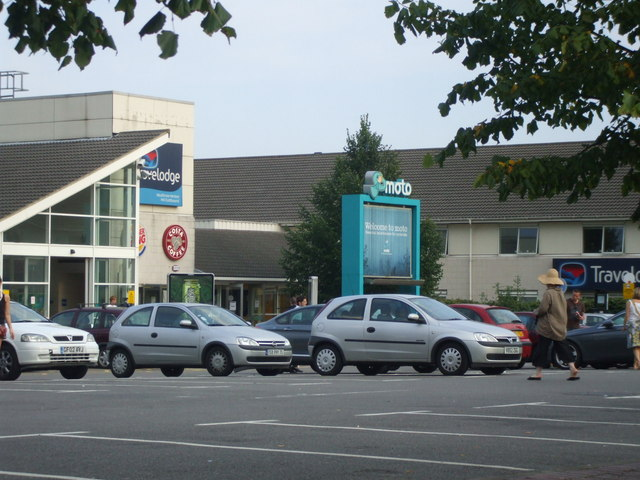
Moto Heston East services

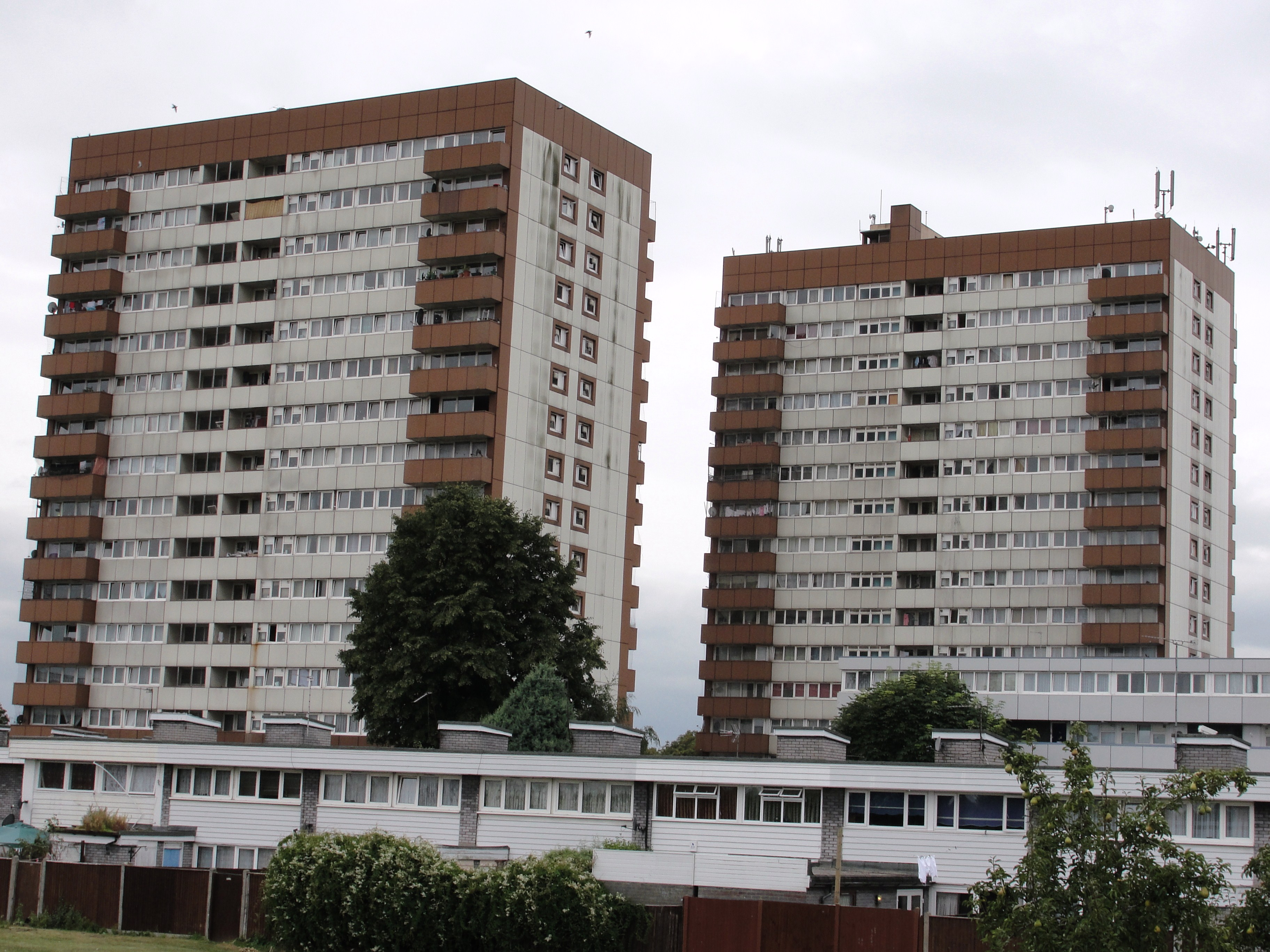
Heston Farm Estate

== Demography and housing ==
2011 Census Homes
Ward	Detached	Semi-detached	Terraced	Flats and apartments	Caravans/temporary/mobile homes/houseboats	Shared between households
Heston Central	215	1,930	534	1,210	1	6
Heston East	287	1,680	749	1,282	1	5
Heston West	175	1,405	855	1,558	20	3

2011 Census Households
Ward	Population	Households	% Owned outright	% Owned with a loan	hectares
Heston Central	12,288	3,896	24	31	168
Heston East	12,319	4,004	25	32	200
Heston West	12,438	4,016	20	26	383

Heston's ethnic groups in 2011 were:

14.9% White British

7.2% Other White (Not covering Irish and Gypsy)

50.9% Asian (majority Indian)

17.2% Black (majority Somali)

This is 2011 combined data for Heston's three wards, Heston East, West and Central.
