= Chester Golf Club =

English golf club

Coordinates: 53°11′12″N 2°54′34″W

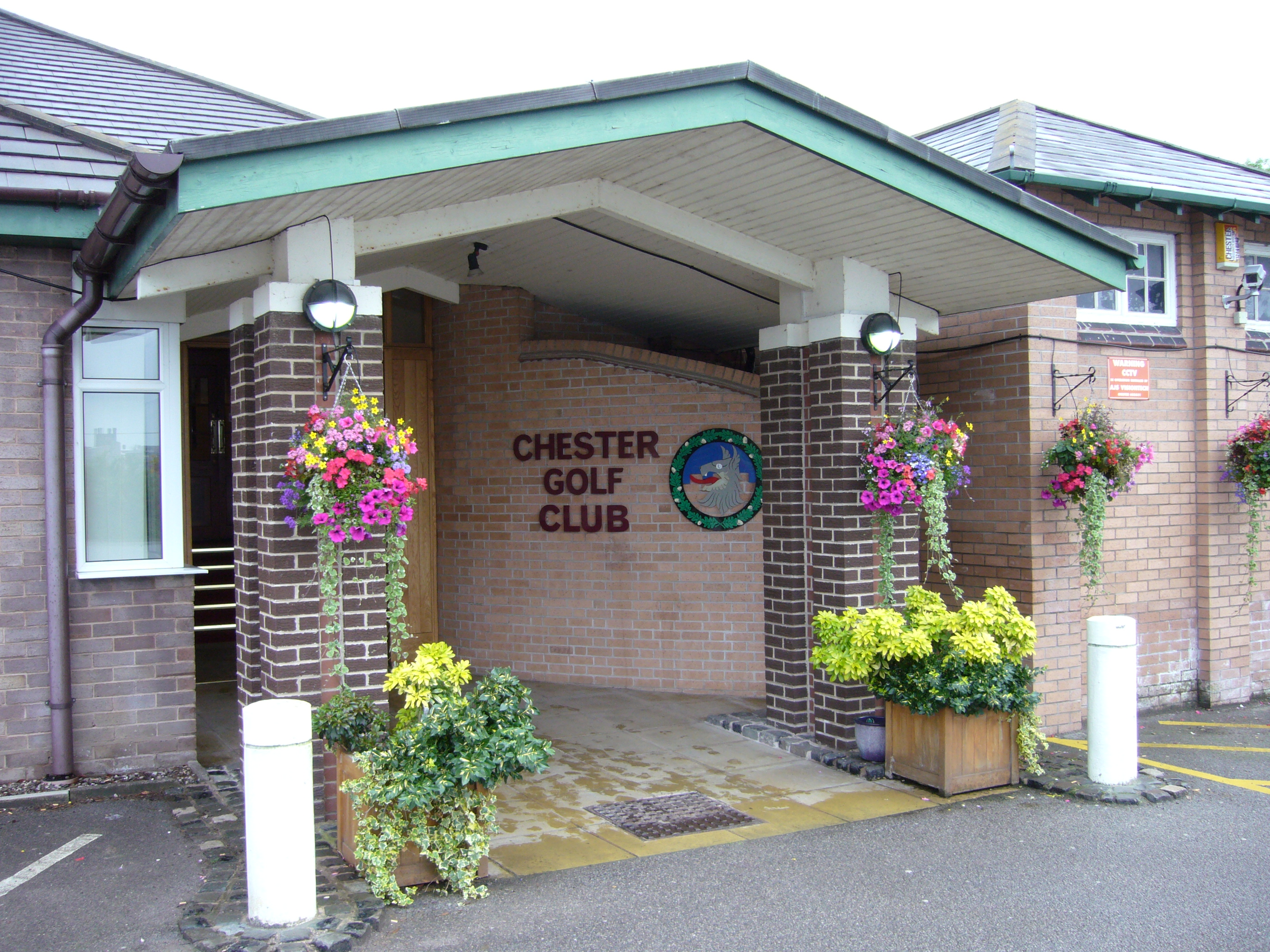
The main entrance of Chester Golf Club.

Chester Golf Club is an English golf club, located in Curzon Park, Chester, Cheshire. The club participates in charity events, competitions and inter-club matches. Set on two levels, the 18-hole parkland course is contained within a loop of the River Dee. The clubhouse has a licensed bar.

The club was founded on 24 May 1901 and is one of the oldest established golf clubs in the county of Cheshire. Formerly known as "Brueres Halgh" during the early Middle Ages, the land was used for agricultural purposes for many years. During the English Civil War a Parliamentary gun emplacement besieging Chester was used to bombard the northern defences of the city from a location close to where the maintenance sheds now stand.

Between 2011 and 2012, a gang broke into and repeatedly robbed the club, damaging the premises and stealing £203,000 worth of property. The suspects were later found guilty and imprisoned for the crime.
