= Curzon Park =

Suburb of Chester in Cheshire, England

Coordinates: 53°10′59″N 2°54′10″W

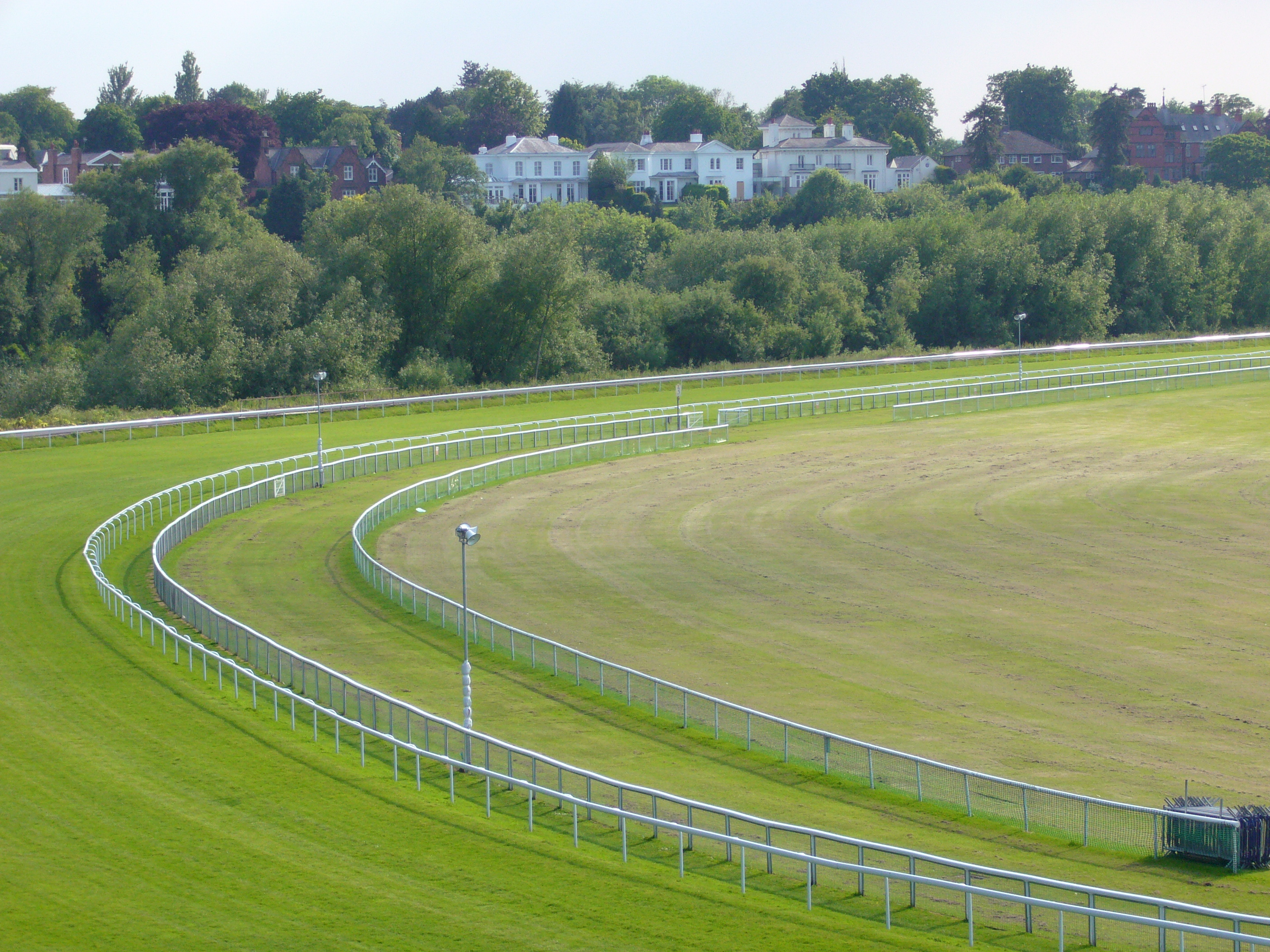
A view of the mansions in Curzon Park seen from across the Roodee.

Curzon Park is a suburb of Chester, Cheshire in England. The area, which adjoins the southern banks of the Dee, was first laid out in the 19th century. It is situated next to the Grosvenor Bridge and is the location of some of the city's most prestigious properties.

Curzon Park also houses Curzon Park Abbey, a retreat house for members of the English Benedictine Congregation. Chester Golf Club adjoins the area.

== History ==
Curzon Park, along with Queen's Park near Handbridge, was developed as an exclusive Chester suburb following the city's growing prosperity in the mid 19th century. Although the opening of Grosvenor Bridge in 1832 had improved access, it was the completion of the North Wales Coast Line to Chester which prompted Richard Curzon-Howe, 1st Earl Howe to develop the aptly-named "Curzon Park" in the mid-1840s on private farmland situated between Hough Green and the river.

Although the plan was to attract wealthy merchants from Liverpool, most of the early home owners were business people and professionals from Chester. Highfield House was the first property to be built in 1847. By 1851 there were nine large detached houses along the cliff above the River Dee. With the development of Curzon Park, the City of Chester corporation began auctioning off land it owned on the north side of Hough Green as individual plots. By 1861 a line of 30 smaller detached and semi-detached villas stretched for half a mile along Hough Green towards Saltney.

Despite the initial interest in Curzon Park, the remainder of the estate remained largely incomplete throughout the latter half of the 19th century. Only six large houses had been built at the eastern end of Park Road (later Curzon Park South) by 1870. Likewise just four villas and two semi-detached properties had been built in Queen's Park, suggesting the demand for exclusive property in Chester was much smaller than anticipated. It was not until 1914 that all plots within the eastern end of Curzon Park had been sold. Work to develop the largely-vacant western end did not begin till after the First World War.

In conjunction with the development of the eastern end of Curzon Park, large detached houses were also constructed around Westminster Avenue, a tree-lined road just south of Hough Green. The avenue originally complimented the main lodge entrance to Curzon Park at the junction with Overleigh Road.
