= Hounslow West tube station =

London Underground station

Hounslow West
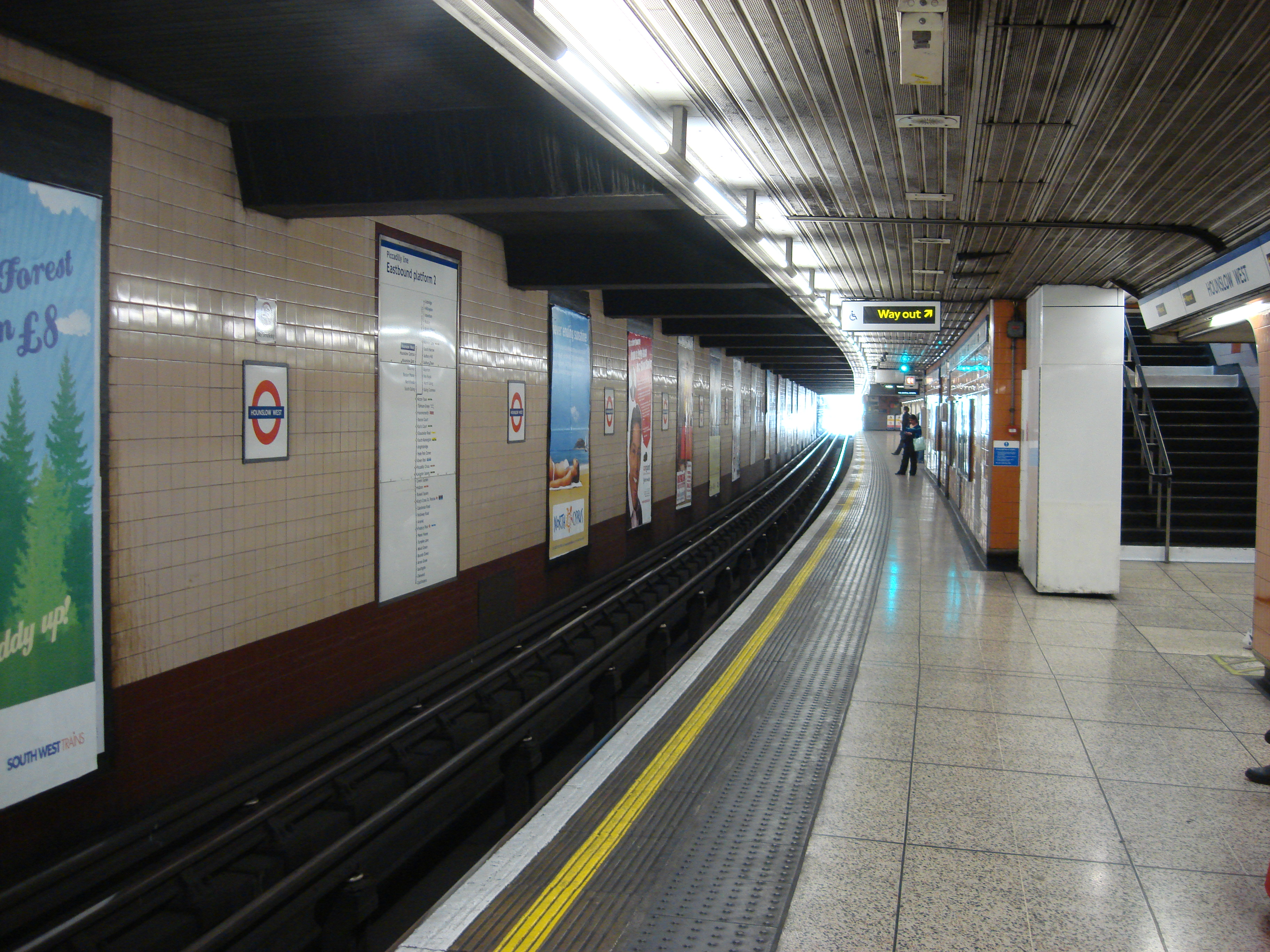
- Piccadilly line eastbound platform at the station
- Interactive map of Hounslow West

General information
- Location: Hounslow West
- Local authority: Hounslow
- Managed by: London Underground
- Number of platforms: 2
- Accessible: Yes (wheelchair users only)
- Fare zone: 5

London Underground annual entry and exit
- 2020: ▼1.83 million
- 2021: ▼1.55 million
- 2022: ▲2.88 million
- 2023: ▼2.78 million
- 2024: ▲2.93 million

Railway companies
- Original company: District Railway

Key dates
- 21 July 1884: Opened as Hounslow Barracks; terminus of line
- 1 December 1925: Renamed Hounslow West
- 13 March 1933: Piccadilly line service introduced
- 9 October 1964: District line service ceased
- 14 July 1975: Platforms relocated
- 19 July 1975: Line extended to Hatton Cross

Listed status
- Listing grade: II
- Entry number: 1241237
- Added to list: 23 September 1998

Other information
- External links: TfL station info page
- Coordinates: 51.47361°N 0.38556°W

Hounslow West is a London Underground station in locality of Hounslow West in the London Borough of Hounslow. It is on the Heathrow branch of the Piccadilly line, between Hatton Cross and Hounslow Central stations. The station is in London fare zone 5. It is located on Bath Road, close to the Great West Road (A4). The station has an island platform, with step-free access via a stairlift for manual wheelchair users only.

Opened as Hounslow Barracks in 1884, it was initially served by the District Railway (now part of the District line). The Piccadilly line was extended here in 1933, and District line services were fully withdrawn in 1964. The station building was rebuilt to a design by Charles Holden in 1931. The line was extended again in phases to Heathrow Airport in the 1970s, which resulted in the station's platforms being relocated, and new surface buildings constructed to connect to the existing station.

== Location ==
The station is located on Bath Road (A3006) about 600 m (2,000 ft) from its junction with A4 Great West Road and Great South West Road (A30), and is surrounded by its car park. It serves mainly the commercial and residential area of western Hounslow, also called Hounslow West, but is also near Cranford and Heston. Hounslow West station is near Cavalry Barracks, which served as a reference for part of the old name of the station. Nearby landmarks include Beaversfield Park, Hounslow Medical Centre and St. Paul's Church.

== History ==
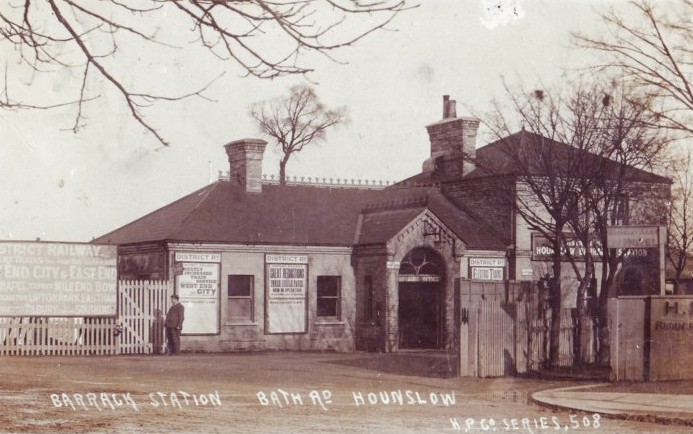
The original station building

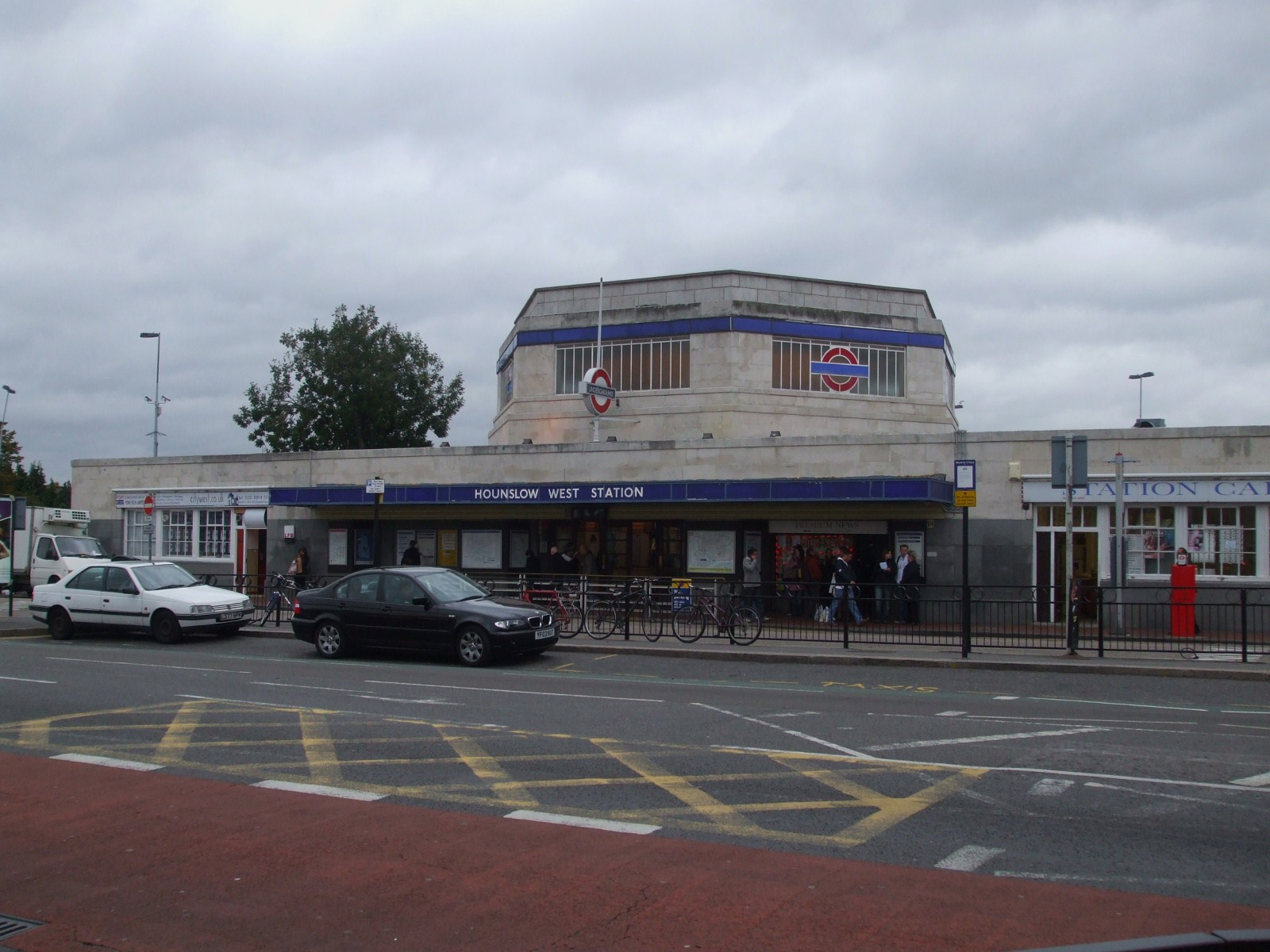
The current Hounslow West station building, which was retained when the platforms were resited underground.

The station was opened as Hounslow Barracks on a single-track branch of the Hounslow & Metropolitan Railway on 21 July 1884, (Note: The other branch was Hounslow Town, which finally closed in 1909.) which connected with the District Railway (DR, now part of the District line) at Mill Hill Park (now Acton Town). It was named in reference to the Cavalry Barracks, Hounslow south of the station on Beavers Lane. Initially the only service was a shuttle to Osterley & Spring Grove; this was replaced by a shuttle to Mill Hill Park on 31 March 1886. A new station, Heston–Hounslow (now Hounslow Central), was opened on the same day. The DR took over all of its railway services in 1903. (Note: Originally, the branch was partially operated by local landowners and the DR. The DR officially took over the railway in 1903.) The DR's tracks were electrified between 1903 and 1905 with electric trains replacing steam trains on the Hounslow branch from 13 June 1905.

On 1 December 1925, the station was renamed to its present name. (Note: It was renamed together with Hounslow Central and Hounslow East.) Within the same year, substantial provisions were made to extend the Piccadilly line to relieve capacity on the District line. The former would take over services on the Hounslow and Uxbridge branches. The line, being still single-tracked, was doubled in stages. (Note: The section between Osterley & Spring Grove and Hounslow Central was doubled from 24 April 1910, with a new island platform built.) Works were completed on 27 November 1926, with the station's alignment reconfigured to have three platforms and brought into use on 11 December. The oldest platform furthest to the south was not reopened until 27 March 1927, with the original station still in situ. Between 1930 and 1931, a new station building was constructed facing onto Bath Road to replace the original building which was parallel with the tracks and set back at an angle from the road. The original building was gradually demolished, and the new building opened on 5 July 1931. Piccadilly line services, which had been running as far as Northfields since 9 January 1933, were extended to Hounslow West on 13 March 1933. From that date, the branch was jointly operated by both lines. District line services were progressively reduced to rush-hour only services in the late 1950s; they were withdrawn on 9 October 1964.

=== Heathrow extension ===
An extension of the line from Hounslow West to serve Heathrow Airport had been planned since the 1960s. Formal approval was given in 1967, and work began with a groundbreaking ceremony by Sir Desmond Plummer on 27 April 1971. The original alignment of the tracks and platforms at Hounslow West was too skewed from the extension. The new alignment was to relocate the station platforms underground, with cut and cover tunnels along Bath Road and Great South West Road. The line surfaces briefly over the River Crane before descending to reach Hatton Cross towards Heathrow. The new rerouted tracks meant that the existing had to be reduced to single track operation until the station approach. Platform 3, being the northernmost, was decommissioned early on 22 October 1971 due to being situated right on the path of the new track alignment. The old DR signal box was also taken out of service, with a temporary one built near Platform 1. Some of the tracks were demolished in June 1975 for further excavation and track simplification works. The new platforms were brought into use on 14 July 1975 and the line was opened as far as Hatton Cross five days later on 19 July. The existing 1930s station building was kept, and a new link was constructed to connect to the new platforms. The line was further extended to Heathrow on 16 December 1977. The old platforms were demolished and was filled in, creating around 400 car parking spaces.

== The station today ==
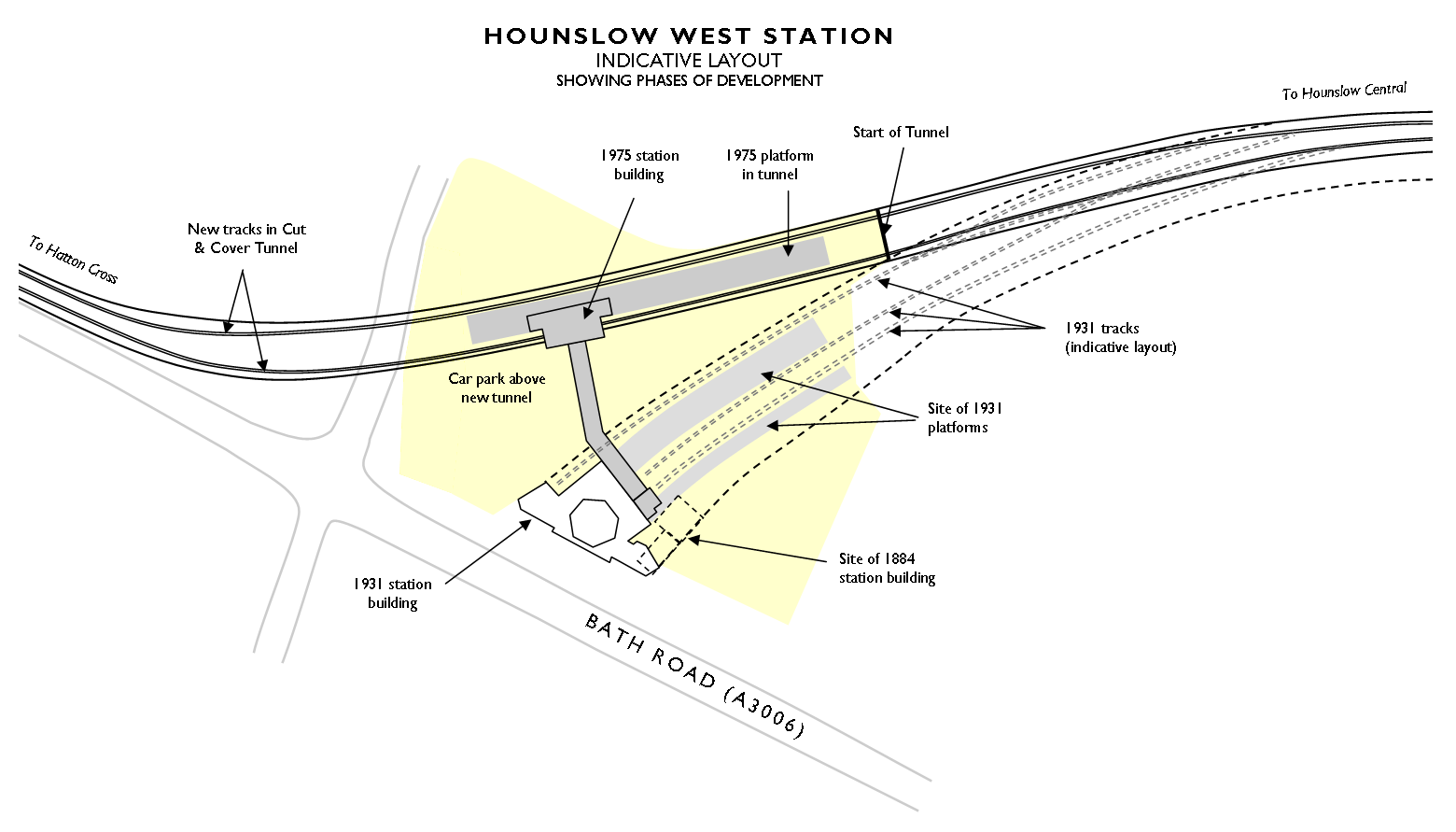
Indicative layout of Hounslow West station

When the Piccadilly line was planned to be extended here, the station was to receive a new station building. Charles Holden, who was part of the Adams, Holden & Pearson architectural practice, designed the exteriors under the supervision of Stanley Heaps on-site. The new building is in a style reminiscent of Holden's designs for the 1926 Morden extension of the City and South London Railway (now part of the Northern line). Basil Ionides designed the interior of the ticket hall. Portland stone was used for the facade, strengthened by a reinforced concrete base. Its front is constructed of granite, while its rear is made of bricks. Glazed screens are fitted onto all sides of the tall heptagonal ticket hall, with an adjoined rectangular shopfront. In addition to its drum shape being heptagonal, its ceiling motif contains this pattern, with a chandelier featuring seven lamps of the same geometry. A wooden ticket booth (known as a passimeter) sits in the middle of the ticket hall, albeit now disused. The building is very similar to the reconstructed station at Ealing Common built at the same time, also by Heaps and Holden. The station is a Grade II listed building.

The station has two platforms for the Piccadilly line, located below surface level. Platform 1 is for trains to Heathrow Airport, while Platform 2 is allocated to services bound for Cockfosters. These were built in 1975 together with the steel bridge connected to the ticket hall. As with other stations on the Heathrow extension, artwork was to be installed on the new platforms, with a station motif designed by Tom Eckersley. However the artwork was never installed. The platforms are reached by flights of stairs and a stairlift, which makes the station step-free for manual wheelchair users only. It is also the only London Underground station to be wheelchair accessible for manual wheelchair users only.

== Future ==
In the late 2010s, the station car park at Hounslow West was proposed by Transport for London (TfL) for property development, as part of TfL's plans to increase the amount of income generated from land in their ownership. As of September 2020, over 400 new affordable homes are currently planned to be built on the current car park at the station by housing association A2Dominion. The proposals also include a new public square, retail space and a smaller amount of replacement station car parking.

== Services ==
Hounslow West station is on the Heathrow branch of the Piccadilly line in London fare zone 5. It is between Hatton Cross to the west and Hounslow Central to the east. As of 2020, typical off-peak services, in trains per hour (tph), are as follows:

- 12 tph eastbound to Cockfosters
- 6 tph westbound to Heathrow Terminals 2 & 3, followed by Terminal 5
- 6 tph westbound to Heathrow Terminal 4, followed by Terminals 2 & 3

Night tube is also operational on this part of the line, with a train every 10 minutes in both directions between Heathrow Terminal 5 and Cockfosters.

Preceding station	London Underground	Following station
Hatton Cross towards Heathrow Airport (Terminal 4 or Terminal 5)	Piccadilly line Heathrow branch	Hounslow Central towards Cockfosters or Arnos Grove
Former services
Preceding station	London Underground	Following station
Terminus	District line Hounslow branch (1884-86)	Osterley & Spring Grove towards Whitechapel
Terminus	District line Hounslow branch (1886-1964)	Hounslow Central towards Upminster
Terminus	Piccadilly line Hounslow branch (1933-75)	Hounslow Central towards Cockfosters or Arnos Grove

== Connections ==
London Buses routes 81, 203, 222, 482, H28, H32, H91, H98 and night route N9 serve the station. Formerly, airport shuttle services from different bus companies began here. However most of them relocated their termini to Hatton Cross in conjunction with the Piccadilly line extension there in 1975. Notably, the A1 express service picked up passengers from the station, but this ceased when the Heathrow extension opened in 1977.

== Notable commutes ==
Winston Churchill recalls travelling to Hounslow Barracks two or three times a week whilst living at his mother's house in Knightsbridge around 1896.

== See also ==
- Map showing operational dates for lines and stations in Hounslow

== Notes and references ==
=== Bibliography ===
- Churchill, Winston (11 May 2010). My Early Life: 1874-1904. ISBN 9781439125069.
- Day, John R.; Reed, John (2008) [1963]. The Story of London's Underground (10th ed.). Capital Transport. ISBN 978-1-85414-316-7.
- Day, John R; Reed, John (2010) [1963]. The Story of London's Underground (11th ed.). Capital Transport. ISBN 978-1-85414-341-9.
- Horne, Mike (2006). The District Line: An Illustrated History. Capital Transport. ISBN 1-85414-292-5.
- Horne, Mike (2007). The Piccadilly Tube – A History of the First Hundred Years. London: Capital Transport. ISBN 978-1-85414-305-1.
- Martin, Andrew (2012). Underground, Overground: A Passenger's History of the Tube. Profile Books. ISBN 978-1-84765-807-4.
- Rose, Douglas (1999). The London Underground, A Diagrammatic History. Douglas Rose/Capital Transport. ISBN 1-85414-219-4.
