= Temple Ewell Preceptory =

Templars' preceptory in Kent, England

Coordinates: 51°9′44″N 1°16′16″E

Temple Ewell Preceptory was a preceptory of the Knights Templar at Temple Ewell on the northern outskirts of Dover in Kent, England.

== History ==
Since Saxon times there had been a wooden church by the ancient road from London to Dover (now the A2). The Knights Templar acquired the manor of Ewell in 1163 and replaced the wooden structure with a Norman church made of stone. After the Templars were suppressed in 1312, the Knights Hospitaller took over the site until it was dissolved in 1535. The remaining structures were demolished in the 18th century and nothing now remains above ground. Excavations at Temple Farm in 1864 and 1866 found some medieval tiles and ironwork.
