= Tooting Priory =

Priory in Tooting, England

Coordinates: 51.4323338°N 0.1456654°W

- Tooting Bec Priory
- Tooting Priory
- Location: Tooting (now in the London Borough of Wandsworth)
- Country: England

Tooting Priory or Tooting Bec Priory was a priory in Tooting, now in the London Borough of Wandsworth. It was dissolved before 1315 and the land was granted to Eton College in 1440.
