= Patrixbourne Priory =

Priory in Kent, England

Coordinates: 51°15′12.4″N 1°8′11.27″E

Patrixbourne Priory was a priory in Kent, England.
