= Hounslow West =

Coordinates: 51.468445402963646°N 0.3888526266408676°W

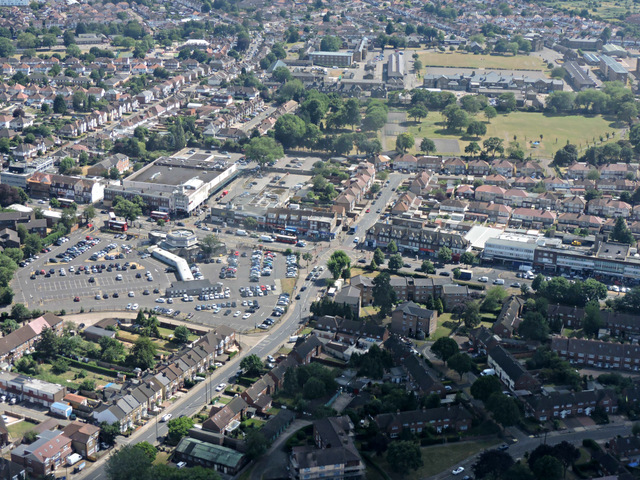
- Hounslow West from the air, including the tube station (centre left) and former barracks (upper right)

- Location within Greater London
- Population: 12,658
- OS grid reference: TQ120756
- London borough: Hounslow
- Ceremonial county: Greater London
- Region: London
- Country: England
- Sovereign state: United Kingdom
- Post town: HOUNSLOW
- Postcode district: TW4, TW3
- Dialling code: 020
- Police: Metropolitan
- Fire: London
- Ambulance: London
- UK Parliament: Feltham & Heston
- London Assembly: South West

Hounslow West is an area of the London Borough of Hounslow, United Kingdom. It is part of the western residential area of Hounslow but is its separate area. The area came about with the arrival of the District Railway and then the Piccadilly Line with the opening of what is now Hounslow West tube station and the remodeling of Hounslow Barracks

The River Crane bounds the area to the west, Cranford and the A30 road to the north and north-west, Hounslow to the east and south-east and Hounslow Heath to the south.

Features of the area include Beaversfield Park, Hounslows Heath, Beavers Primary School, St Paul's Church and Hounslow Bowls Club.

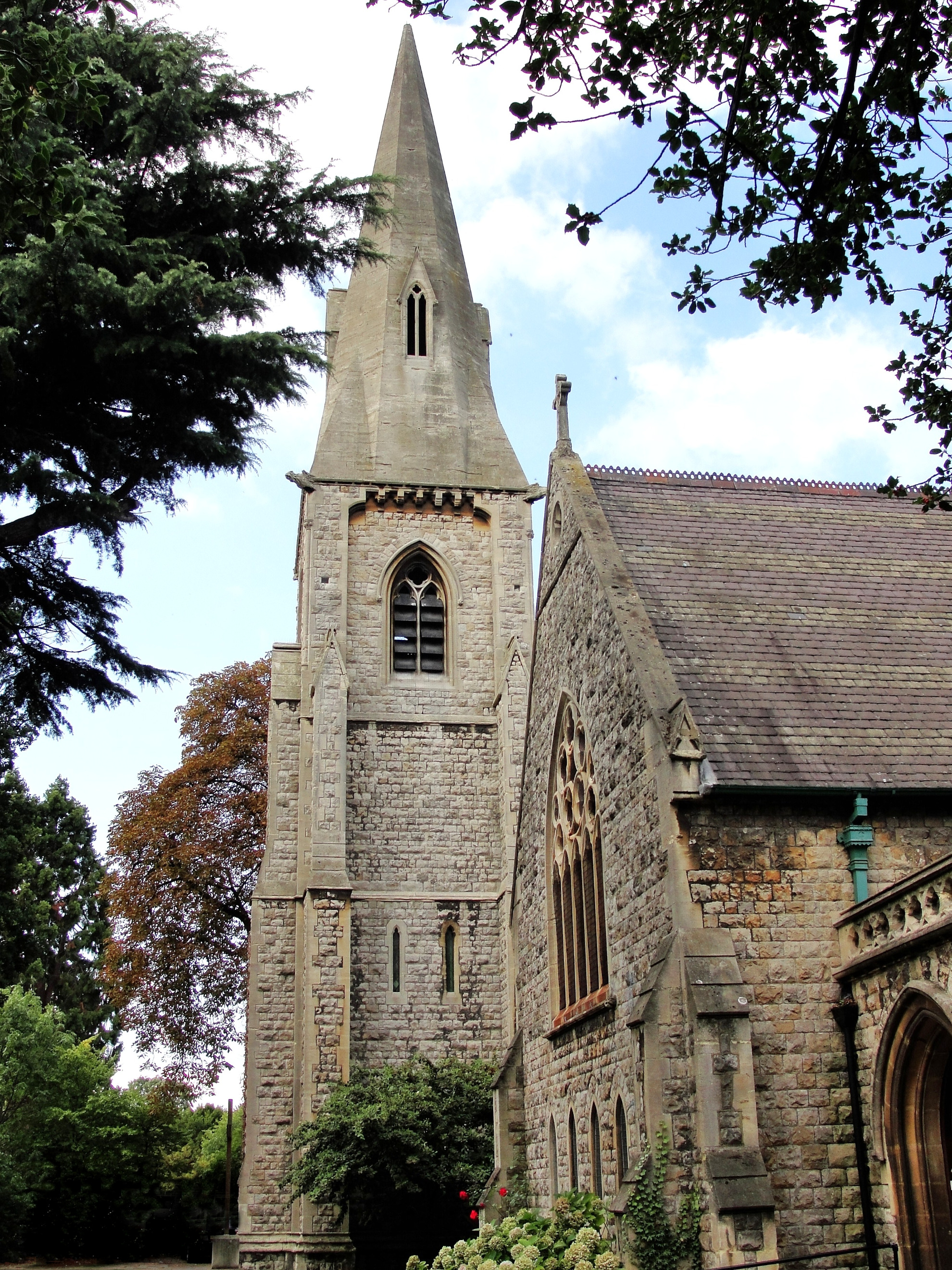
St Paul's Church

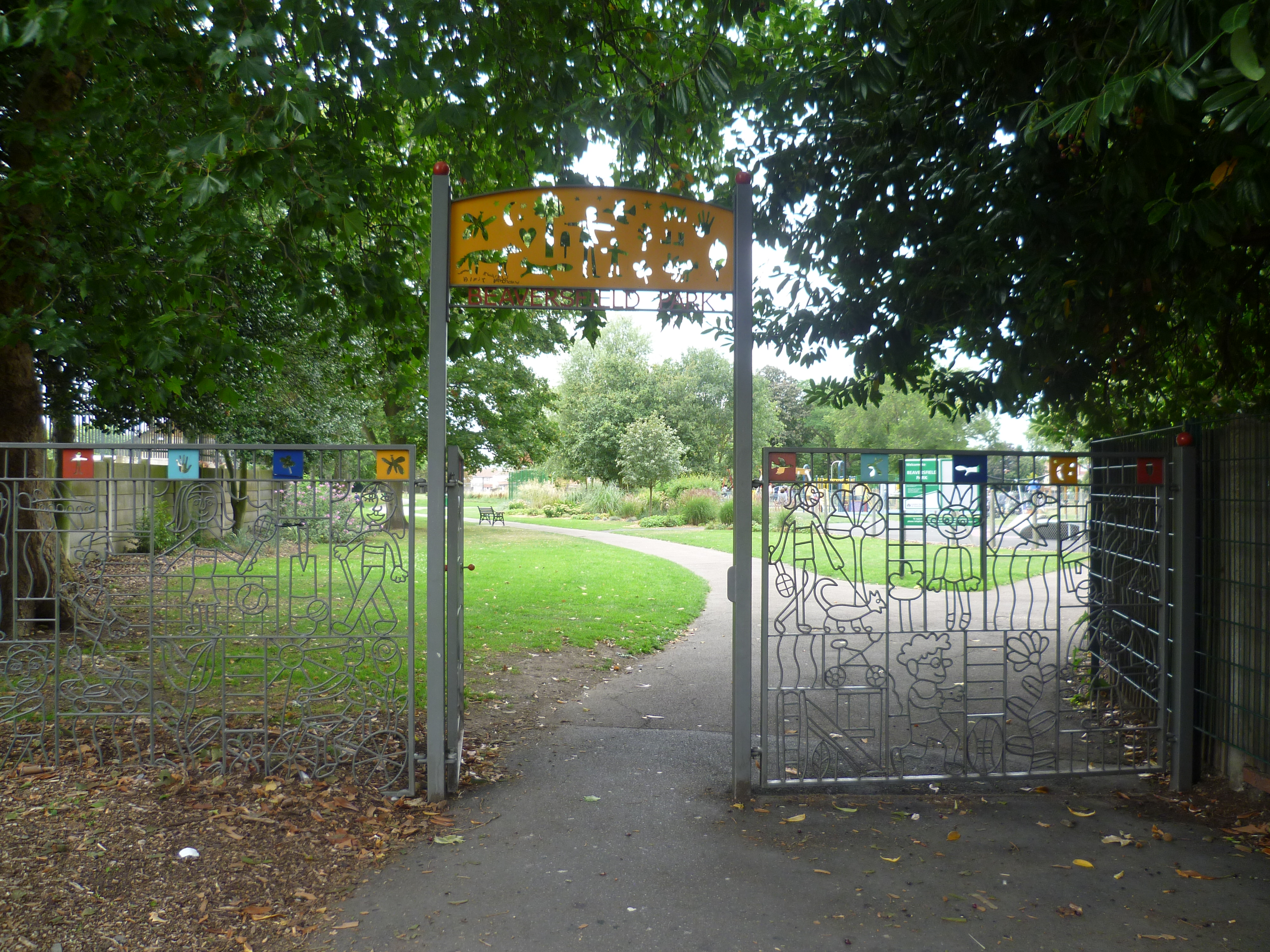
Entrance to Beaversfield Park

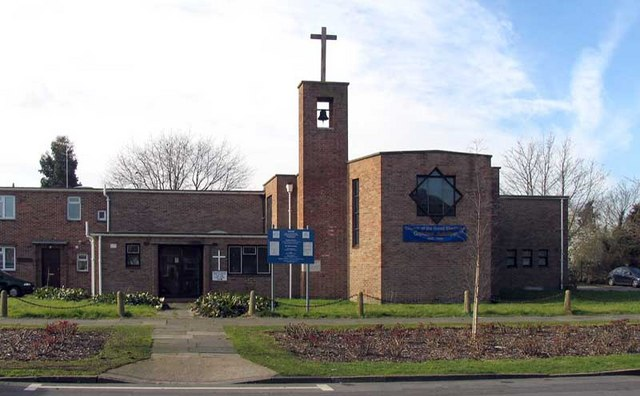
Church of the Good Shepherd

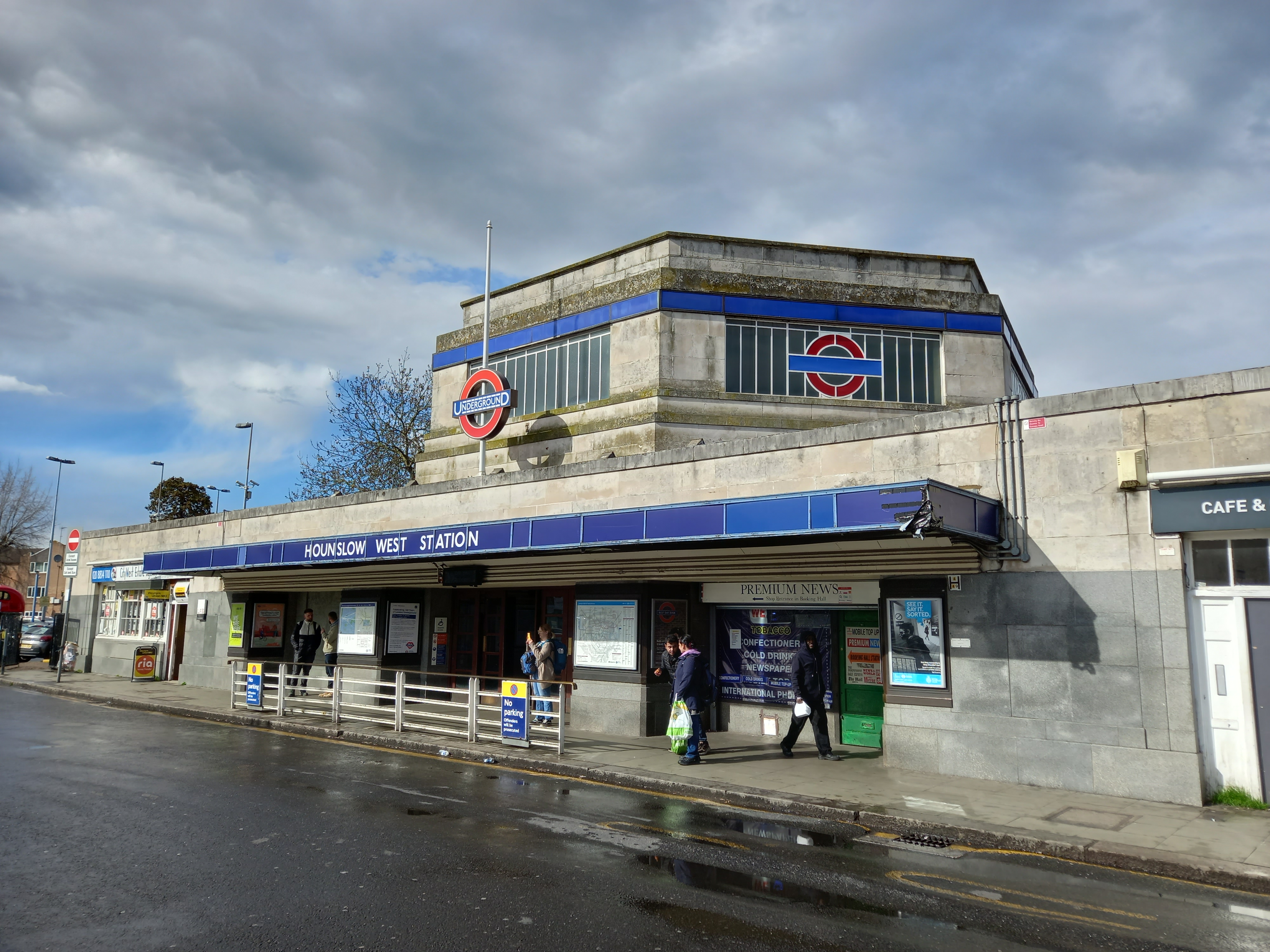
Hounslow West tube station

== Nearest stations ==
- Hounslow West tube station
- Hounslow Central tube station
- Hounslow railway station
