= Hounslow Priory =

Priory in London, England

Hounslow Priory was a priory in London, England. It was first recorded existing in the year 1200.
