= Curzon Park Abbey =

Benedictine nunnery in Cheshire, England

- Location within Cheshire

Monastery information
- Full name: Curzon Park Abbey
- Order: Benedictine
- Established: 24 June 1868
- Dedication: Our Lady Help of Christians
- Diocese: Shrewsbury
- Controlled churches: Curzon Park Abbey

People
- Founder: Mother Hilda Stewart

Site
- Location: Curzon Park, Chester, England
- Coordinates: 53.180833°N 2.903889°W

Curzon Park Abbey is one of three monasteries of nuns in the English Benedictine Congregation, that since 2021 is affiliated to the Stanbrook Abbey.

== History ==
It began as an Anglican Benedictine convent at Feltham, Middlesex, founded by Father Ignatius on 24 June 1868. Feltham Priory, or Feltham Nunnery, was dedicated to Saints Mary and Scholastica (twin sister of St Benedict).

The community spent 5 years in Feltham before moving to Twickenham, West Malling and Milford Haven before settling in Talacre, North Wales in 1920, having been received into the Roman Catholic Church in 1913. In 1921, the nuns were accepted as members of the English Benedictine Congregation, thus inheriting a venerable tradition and a more deeply rooted Catholic identity. The changes heralded by Vatican II led to an increasing simplification in the style of monastic life. The present Community is responding to the call for renewal within the Church, and finding an authentic role in society today.

In July 1988 the community of nuns moved to a much smaller property in Curzon Park, Chester, where they also have a small retreat house. The main Abbey building is a converted late 19th Century mansion constructed mainly of red brick. A chapel was built on the Curzon Park Abbey site in 1997.

On 8 June 2021, the Holy See authorised the affiliation of the Curzon Park Abbey to the community of Stanbrook Abbey.
