= Hounslow tube station =

Hounslow tube station could refer to one of a number of London Underground stations serving the Hounslow area of west London:

- Hounslow East
- Hounslow Central
- Hounslow West

A closed station, Hounslow Town, was located at the eastern end of Hounslow High Street.

== See also ==
- Hounslow railway station, a National Rail station in the same district
