= Boston Manor tube station =

London Underground station

Boston Manor
- Station building in 2026
- Interactive map of Boston Manor

General information
- Location: Brentford
- Local authority: London Borough of Hounslow
- Managed by: London Underground
- Number of platforms: 2
- Fare zone: 4

London Underground annual entry and exit
- 2021: ▼0.88 million
- 2022: ▲1.49 million
- 2023: ▼1.44 million
- 2024: ▼1.36 million
- 2025: ▼1.28 million

Railway companies
- Original company: District Railway

Key dates
- 1 May 1883: Opened as Boston Road
- 11 December 1911: Renamed Boston Manor
- 13 March 1933: Piccadilly line service introduced
- 9 October 1964: District line service ceased

Listed status
- Listing grade: II
- Entry number: 1063901
- Added to list: 21 March 2002; 24 years ago

Other information
- External links: TfL station info page
- Coordinates: 51.4955°N 0.3252°W

Boston Manor is a London Underground station in Brentford, at the boundary of the boroughs of Hounslow and Ealing. It is on the Heathrow branch of the Piccadilly line, between Osterley and Northfields stations. It is in London fare zone 4.

The station is on a street-level bridge over the line on Boston Manor Road, serving the neighbourhood around Boston Manor House, north-west of Brentford, and southern parts of Hanwell. Opened in 1883 by the District Railway, it was reconstructed in 1932 to a Grade II-listed building. Designed by architect Charles Holden, the Art Deco styled structure features a tall tower which acts as a landmark of the area. The station was once served by both the Piccadilly and District lines, with the latter having its last service withdrawn in 1964.

== Location ==
Boston Manor station entrance is on Boston Manor Road, and the station serves a small residential area in Brentford. The station sits close to the boundary between the London Borough of Hounslow and London Borough of Ealing. Nearby places include Boston Manor playing fields, Elthorne Park High School, Gunnersbury Boys School and Swyncombe playing field. The Grand Union Canal and Brent river are also accessible from the station. Northfields depot is just east of the station. Boston Manor dates back to the 1170s as "Bordwadestone", which referred to Bord's tun, or farm, by the stone. The Jacobean mansion named Boston Manor House was constructed in 1622–23, and is also near the station.

== History ==
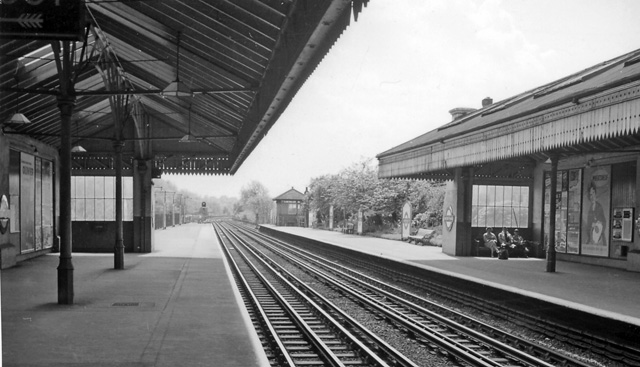
Station platform in 1961

In 1866, permission was given to local landowners for a Hounslow and Metropolitan Railway, which would serve areas in Hounslow such as Boston Manor, and to connect to another proposed line called the Acton & Brentford railway. However, the latter was never constructed but instead a 5 1/2-mile-long (8.9 km) extension of the District Railway (DR) from Mill Hill Park (now Acton Town) to Hounslow Barracks (now Hounslow West) was considered and granted.

Boston Manor was initially opened by the DR on 1 May 1883 as part of an extension from Mill Hill Park to Hounslow Town. (Note: A single-track shuttle branch line from Osterley & Spring Grove, to Hounslow Barracks was opened on the same day. Hounslow Town closed on 2 May 1909, with its branch service terminated. It is replaced by Hounslow East station.) The station was originally named Boston Road. The signs on the platforms gave the name as Boston Manor for Brentford & Hanwell. Electrification of the DR's tracks took place between 1903 and 1905 with electric trains replacing steam trains on the Hounslow branch from 13 June 1905. Northfield (Ealing) Halt (now Northfields), the next stop to the east was only opened on 16 April 1908. The station was given its current name on 11 December 1911.

To prepare for the Piccadilly line extension to Hounslow, the station was rebuilt between 1932 and 1934 in a Modernist style which replaced the 1883 station building. During the reconstruction, a temporary booking hall was built. Most of the platform infrastructure was kept, partly due to its substantial buildings compared to other stations. Piccadilly line services, which had been running as far as Northfields since 9 January 1933, were extended to run to Hounslow West on 13 March 1933 when the partially completed Boston Manor station was opened to passengers. The new station building was finally completed on 25 March 1934.

Because of the Piccadilly line extension, the off-peak District line service through the station was converted to a Hounslow West to South Acton shuttle. This was discontinued on 29 April 1935 while peak hour services were withdrawn completely on 9 October 1964.

In 2018, it was announced that the station would gain step-free access by 2022, as part of a £200m investment to increase the number of accessible stations on the network.

== Station features ==
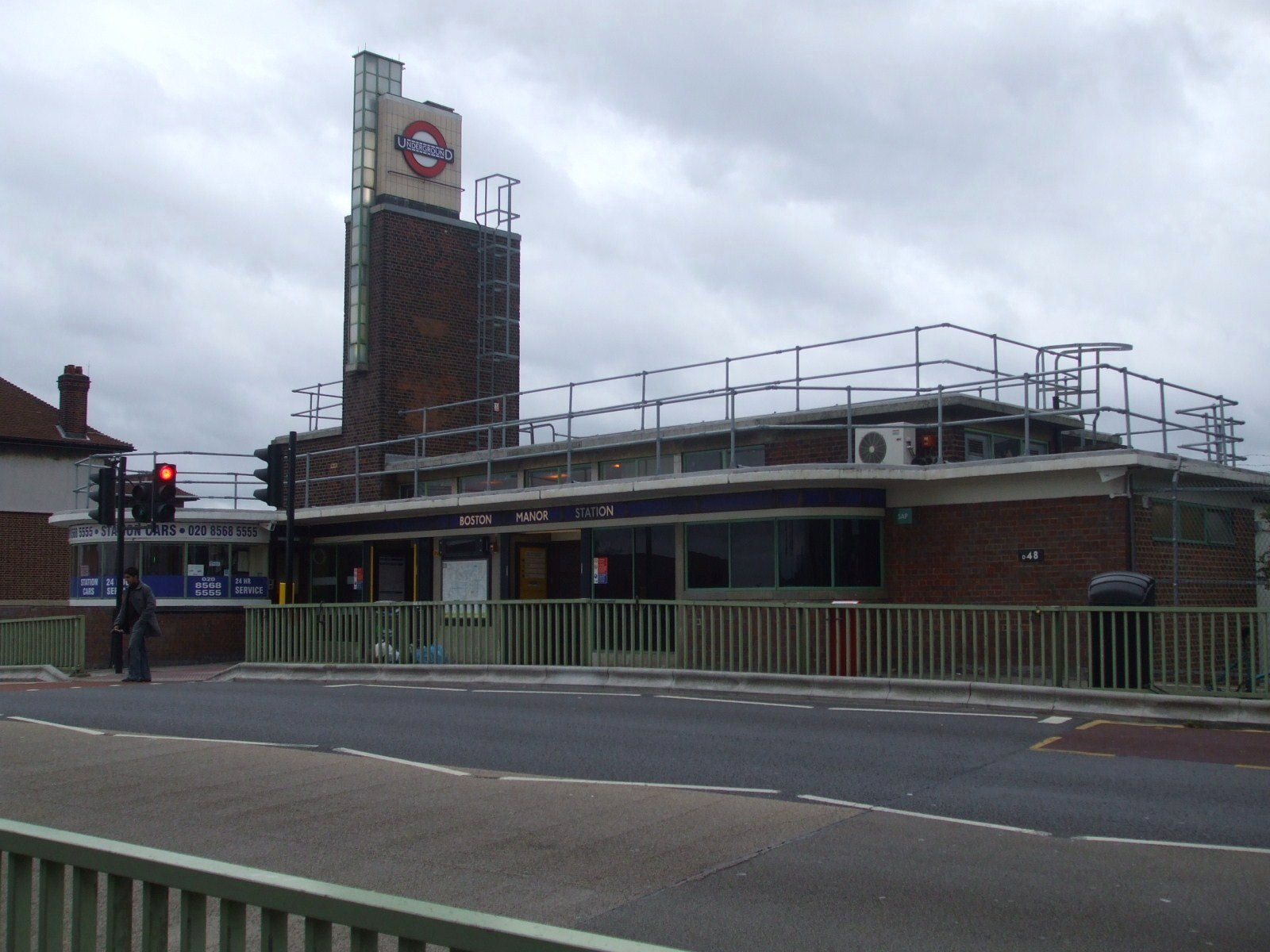
Station exterior in 2008

The original 1883 station building was built by the District Railway. It was a red brick building with an enamel pecked half roundel attached to the arched window space above the booking office entrance. A lampshade branded Tiffany was above the roundel. The original stairs to the platforms with cast iron balustrades are retained. The fretted wooden awnings at the platform remain intact, with the canopy pillars painted black and yellow. Cast iron columns with capitals and octagonal bases provide support for the part-glazed timber roof on iron trusses.

The new station building occupies a narrow site due to the nearby depot, where it was built out over the tracks. It features a Modernist style design by Stanley Heaps, in consultation with Charles Holden. The main structure is of brown bricks and reinforced concrete, topped by a flat roof. Inspired by contemporary Dutch and German architecture, the distinctive tower functions as a landmark within the low-height suburban residential area. The tower is decorated with glazed ceramic tiles and pasted with an enamelled London Underground logo. The upper stages of the tower are fitted with a vertical strip of glass bricks which is part of a lighting feature. The booking hall sits to the right of the single-storey structure, lit with clerestory windows. The ticket office kiosk retains its banded tile decoration. A curved shop unit adjoins to the left side of the structure. Metal-framed windows were added to the western ends of the shelters at platform level.

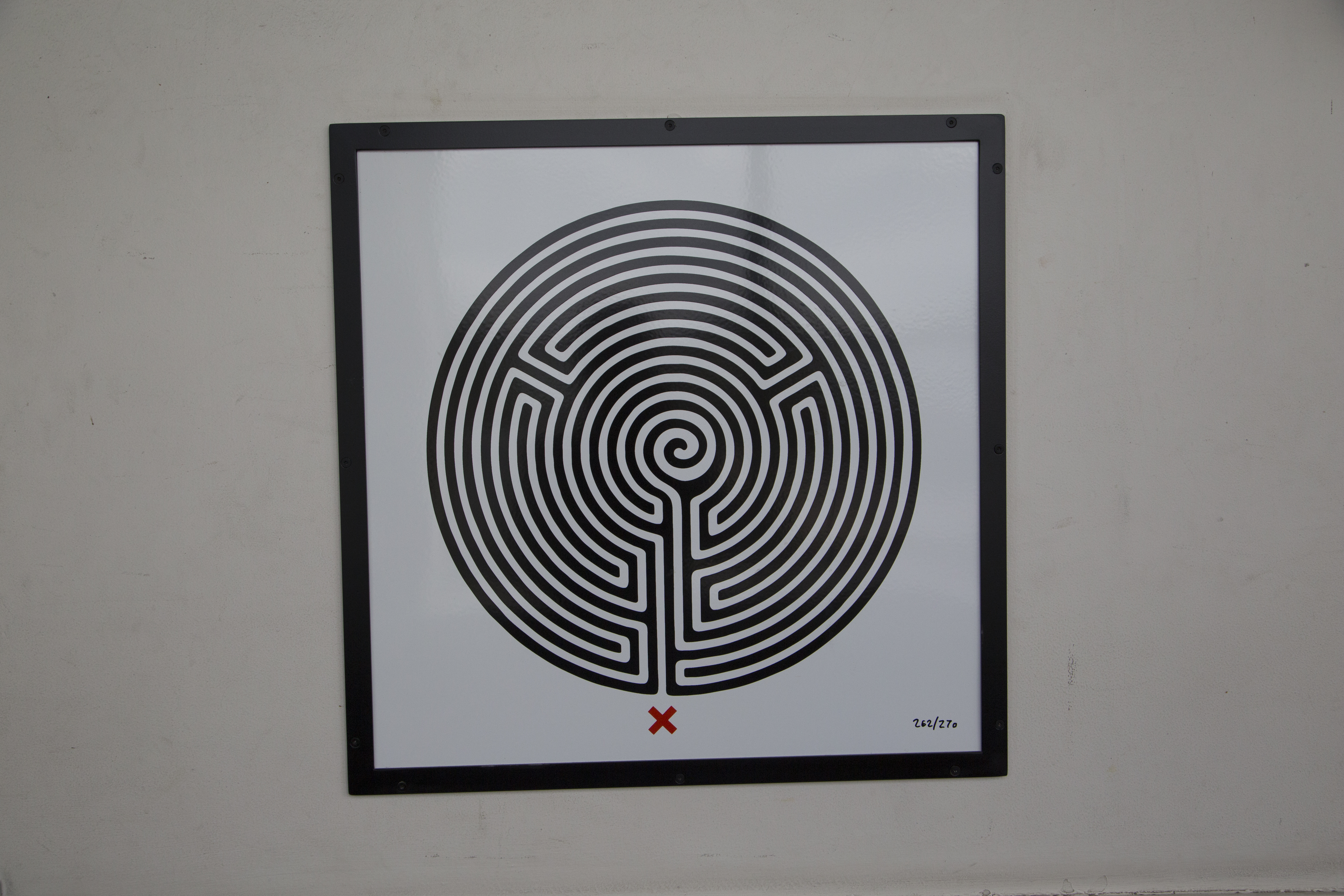
Boston Manor Labyrinth artwork

The station, architecturally noted for Holden's Art Deco design, was granted Grade II Listed status on 21 March 2002. On 9 January 2013, the station appeared on a British postage stamp as part of a set commemorating the 150th anniversary of the first London underground train journey. The stamp's caption read "Boston Manor Art Deco Station". The station also has a Labyrinth puzzle, which is installed at all stations on the Underground network. This labyrinth puzzle is part of the Woodcut family, installed at the top of the stairs leading to eastbound Platform 2, next to a booking office window.

== Services and connections ==
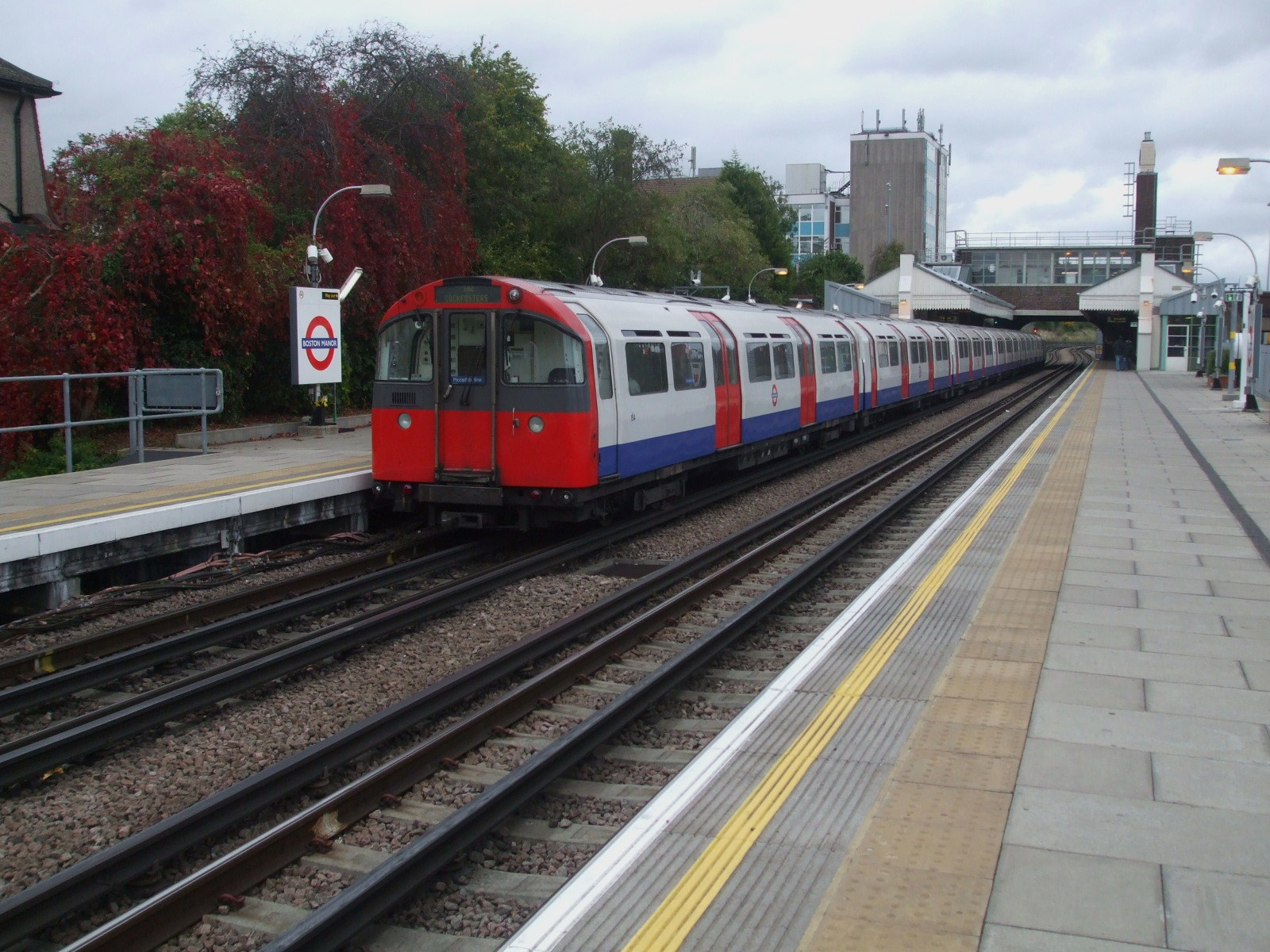
A Piccadilly line train to Cockfosters leaving from the eastbound platform

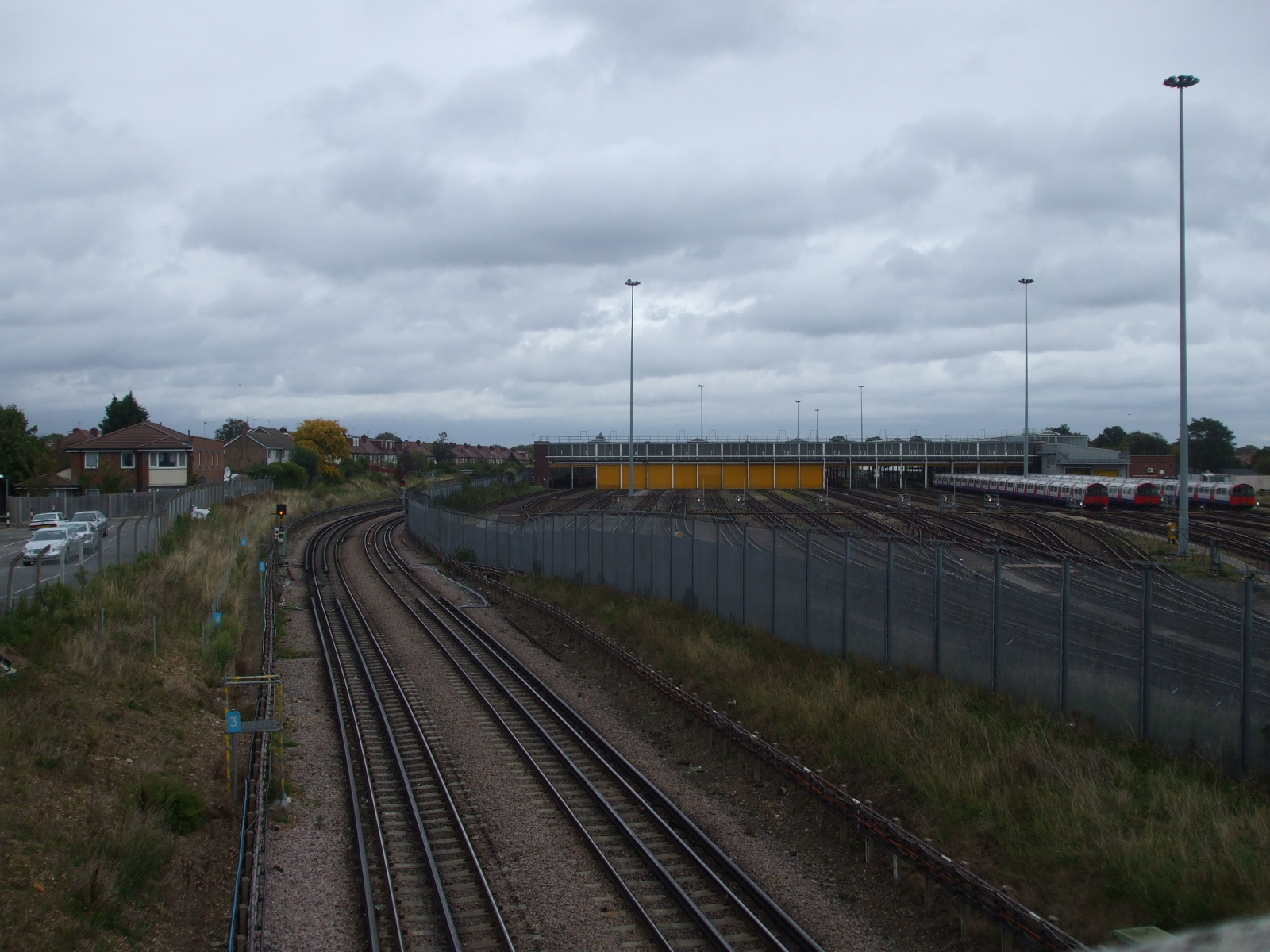
Northfields depot, viewed from the road bridge

=== Services ===
Boston Manor station is on the Heathrow branch of the Piccadilly line in London fare zone 4. It is between Osterley to the west and Northfields to the east. The typical off-peak frequencies, in trains per hour (tph), are as follows:

- 12 tph eastbound to Cockfosters or Arnos Grove
- 6 tph westbound via the Heathrow Terminal 4 loop
- 6 tph westbound to Heathrow Terminal 5

Night tube is also operational on this part of the line, with 6 tph on both directions between Heathrow Terminal 5 and Cockfosters.

Just to the west of the station, Piccadilly line trains can enter or exit the Northfields depot via crossovers. The depot has more than 20 sidings and was built in the 1930s to facilitate the extension of the Piccadilly line to Hounslow. (Note: Northfields station (then named Northfields & Little Ealing) was resited slightly to the east. The old platforms were closed on 18 May 1932 and new junctions to the depot were constructed at the former site. The new platforms opened the next day in spite of the unfinished station building.)

| Preceding station | London Underground | Following station |
|---|---|---|
| Osterley towards Heathrow Airport (Terminal 4 or Terminal 5) | Piccadilly line Heathrow branch | Northfields towards Cockfosters or Arnos Grove |
Former services
| Preceding station | London Underground | Following station |
| Osterley & Spring Grove towards Hounslow Town or Hounslow Barracks | District line (1883–1908) | South Ealing towards Mansion House, Whitechapel or Upminster |
| Osterley & Spring Grove towards Hounslow Town or Hounslow West | District line (1908–34) | Northfields towards Upminster |
| Osterley & Spring Grove towards Hounslow West | Piccadilly line (1933–34) | Northfields towards Cockfosters or Arnos Grove |
| Osterley towards Hounslow West | District line (1934–64) | Northfields towards Upminster |

=== Connections ===
Various London Buses routes serve the station.

== Notes and references ==
=== Books ===
- Connor, J.E. (2000). Abandoned Stations on London's Underground: A Photographic Record (1st ed.). Connor & Butler. ISBN 978-0-94769-930-7.
- Connor, J.E. (2006) [1999]. London's Disused Underground Stations (2nd ed.). Capital Transport. ISBN 1-85414-250-X.
- Day, John R.; Reed, John (2008) [1963]. The Story of London's Underground (10th ed.). Capital Transport. ISBN 978-1-85414-316-7.
- Horne, Mike (2006). The District Line. Capital Transport. ISBN 1-85414-292-5.
- Horne, Mike (2007). The Piccadilly Tube – A History of the First Hundred Years. London: Capital Transport. ISBN 978-1-85414-305-1.
- Lawrence, David (1994). Underground Architecture (1st ed.). Capital Transport. ISBN 978-1-85414-160-6.
- Leboff, David (1994). London Underground Stations. Ian Allan. ISBN 978-0-7110-2226-3.
- Rose, Douglas (1980). The London Underground: A Diagrammatic History (1st ed.). Capital Transport. ISBN 978-1-85414-219-1.
- Rose, Douglas (December 2007) [1980]. The London Underground: A Diagrammatic History (8th ed.). Harrow Weald: Capital Transport. ISBN 978-1-85414-315-0.
- Rose, Douglas (2016) [1980]. The London Underground, A Diagrammatic History (9th ed.). Douglas Rose/Capital Transport. ISBN 978-1-85414-404-1.
- Wallinger, Mark; Self, Will; Warner, Marina; Wolmar, Christian; Bal, Thierry; Coysh, Louise; Dillon, Tamsin (6 October 2014). Labyrinth: A Journey Through London's Underground by Mark Wallinger. Art / Books. ISBN 978-1-90897-016-9.
