= Mr Phantom =

Anonymous London-based contemporary artist

- Known for: Painting, mixed media, installations and public art
- Notable work: The Matrix, The People's Queen
- Website: mrphantom.co.uk

Mr Phantom is an anonymous London-based contemporary artist who works in painting, mixed media and installation art. His work includes gallery pieces and public installations.

== Career ==
Mr Phantom has worked anonymously throughout his career and has not publicly disclosed his identity. His early work included painting and mixed media, while later projects have included installations and public art. His work has dealt with subjects including power, identity, conflict, mental health and digital culture.

In 2025, his work received further attention following the auction of The Matrix and the presentation of G.A.C vs G.A.S: The First Chapter.

In June 2026, The Weight of Silence, a work about men's mental health, appeared in a news-in-pictures feature in The Times during Men's Health Week.

== Notable works ==
=== The Matrix ===
The Matrix is a mixed-media work from 2024. It depicts a crowned figure seated on a throne, with a digital screen in place of a face. In November 2025, the work sold at auction for £147,000 including premiums. The sale was about 40 per cent above its upper estimate.

=== Princess Diana series ===
Mr Phantom painted three portraits of Diana, Princess of Wales: The People's Queen, Grandmaster and The Guardian. Unlike much of his mixed-media work, the three portraits were painted in oils.

The People's Queen was sold privately for £200,000 in 2024. FAD Magazine later reported private sales of £275,000 for Grandmaster and £300,000 for The Guardian, bringing the reported total for the three paintings to £775,000.

== Exhibitions ==
Mr Phantom's debut exhibition, Mr Phantom Solo Art Exhibition, took place on 21 June 2024 at 13 Soho Square, London, W1D 3QF, marking his first solo exhibition.

Mr Phantom's work was presented by London Art Exchange in an online viewing room on Artsy from November 2025.

His later exhibition, G.A.C vs G.A.S: The First Chapter, brought together 26 paintings made during 2025. The exhibition focused on copying and originality in art, including the ways existing images are borrowed and reworked. The paintings covered subjects such as political power, healthcare, surveillance and displacement. The exhibition was subsequently presented at Brunswick Art Gallery in London in February 2026.

== Public projects ==
In 2024, Mr Phantom donated Since You Came Along, from his Lost Lullabies series, to Hammersmith, Fulham, Ealing and Hounslow Mind (HFEH Mind), a mental-health charity serving communities in West London. The work was displayed at The Circle in South Ealing ahead of a planned charity auction on World Mental Health Day. As part of the project, artworks were also taken to local schools for workshops and discussions about mental health.

In May 2026, Mr Phantom installed a series of works at the Courtyard by Marriott in Inverness, where participants in the BBC programme The Celebrity Traitors were staying. Works were placed inside the hotel, while images were projected onto the exterior of the building.

== Public intervention in Clacton ==
In August 2026, Mr Phantom was linked to a demonstration outside Clacton Town Hall during the Clacton by-election. More than 50 people wearing Union Jack face coverings took part. Sky News reported on the gathering, describing an attempted flash mob involving masked people dressed in black hoodies.
