= Osterley & Spring Grove tube station =

London Underground station, 1883–1934

Osterley & Spring Grove
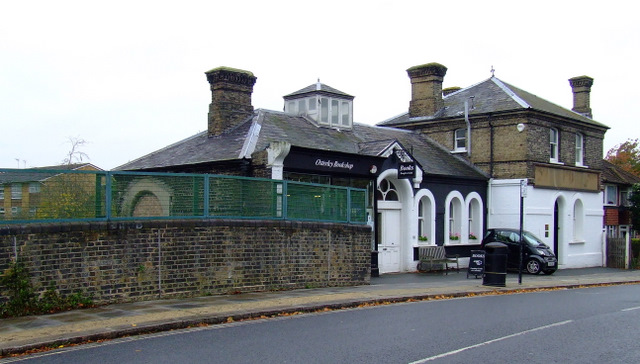
- Station buildings next to the bridge over the railway line
- Interactive map of Osterley & Spring Grove

General information
- Location: Osterley
- Local authority: London Borough of Hounslow

Railway companies
- Original company: District Railway

Key dates
- 1883: Opened
- 1933: Piccadilly line service introduced
- 1934: Closed
- Replaced by: Osterley

Other information
- Coordinates: 51.48306°N 0.34833°W

Osterley & Spring Grove was a London Underground station in Osterley in west London. The station was served by the District and Piccadilly and was closed in 1934 when a new station, Osterley, was opened to the west.

== History ==
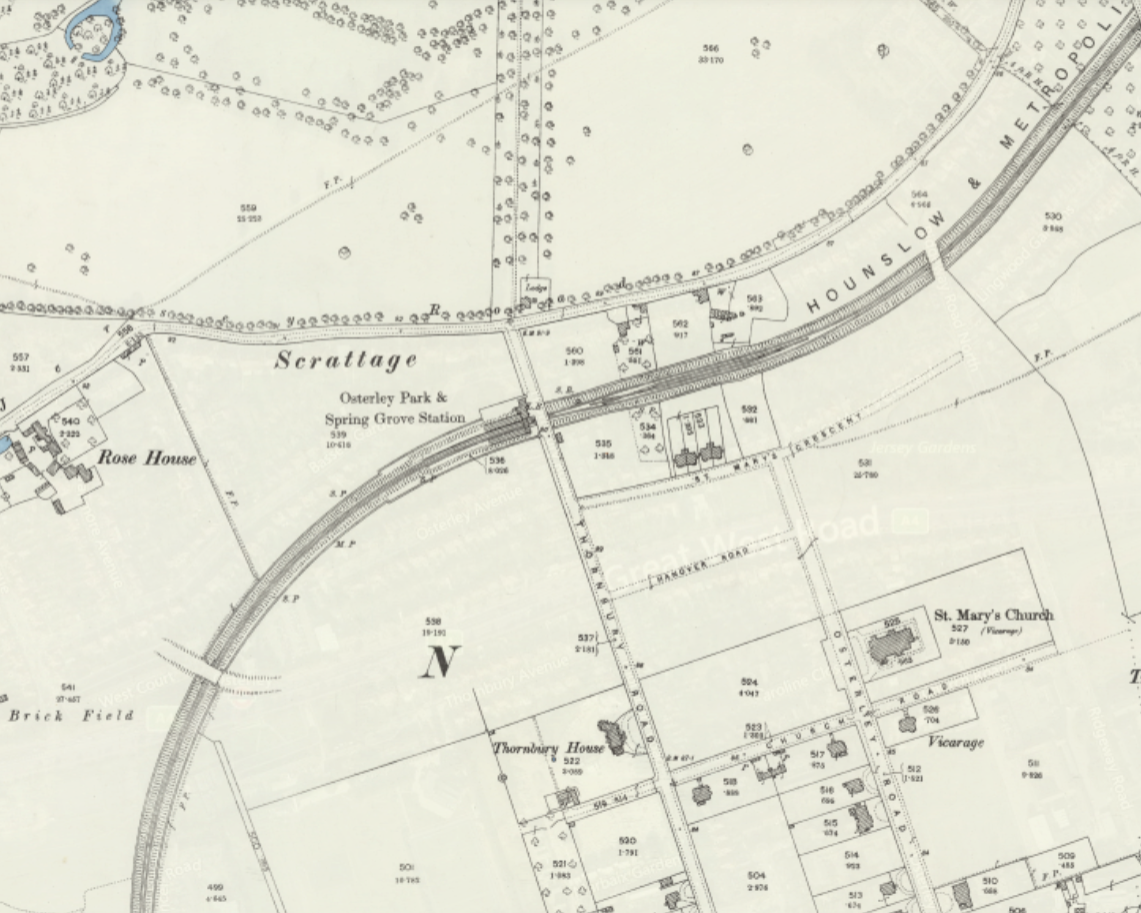
When constructed the line and station were surrounded by countryside

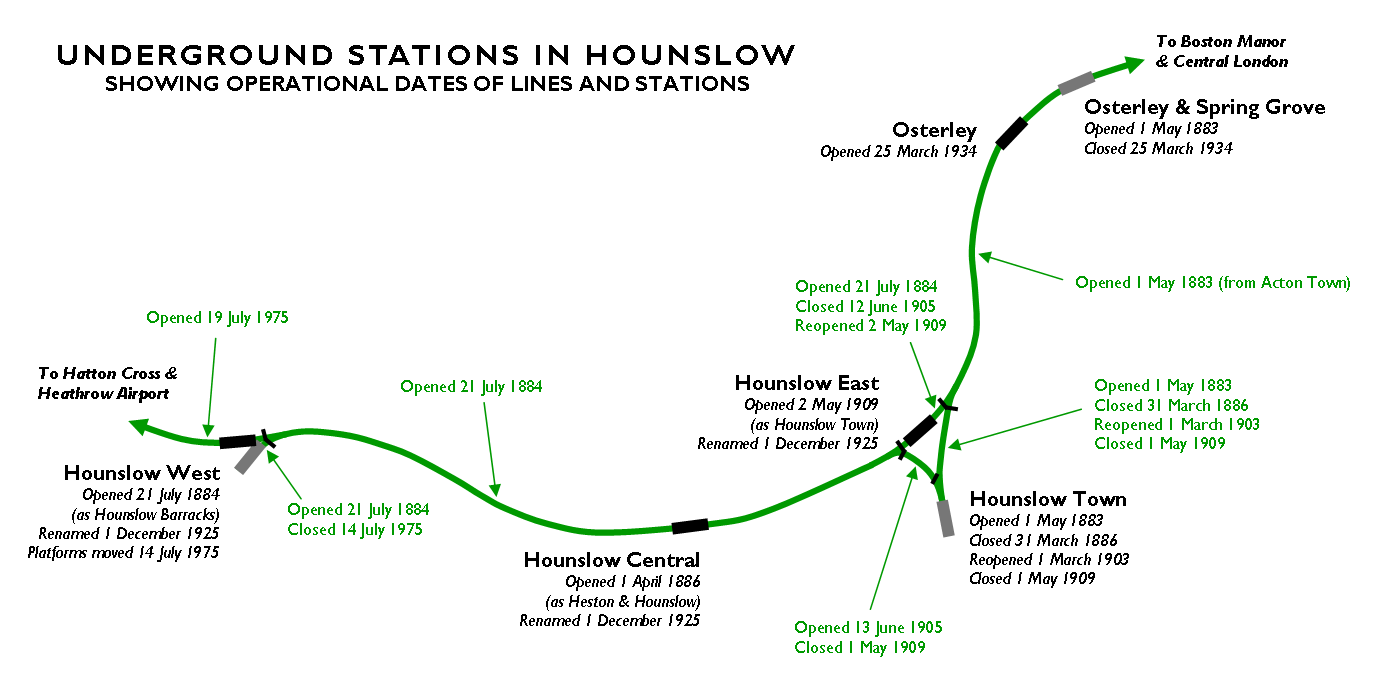
Map showing operational dates for lines and stations in Hounslow

The station was opened by the District line's predecessor, the District Railway (DR), on 1 May 1883 on its line to Hounslow Town (located on Hounslow High Street, but now closed). The station was on Thornbury Road east of the current Osterley station and served Osterley Park and a residential estate to the south named "Spring Grove".

On 21 July 1884 a branch was constructed from shortly north of Hounslow Town to Hounslow Barracks (now Hounslow West). The branch line was constructed as single track and initially had no intermediate stations between the terminus and Osterley & Spring Grove. Until 31 March 1886 passengers travelling west from Osterley & Spring Grove could go to either Hounslow Barracks or Hounslow Town. On that date Hounslow Town station closed and a new station, Heston & Hounslow (now Hounslow Central), opened to the west.

Electrification of the DR's tracks took place between 1903 and 1905 with electric trains replacing steam trains on the Hounslow branch from 13 June 1905. When the branch was electrified, the track between Osterley & Spring Grove and Heston & Hounslow was closed and a new loop was opened from Hounslow Town back to Heston & Hounslow. Trains would run from Osterley & Spring Grove to Hounslow Town then reverse and run to Hounslow Barracks.

This method of operation was unsuccessful and short-lived. On 2 May 1909 the track between Heston & Hounslow and Osterley & Spring Grove was reopened with a new Hounslow Town station (now Hounslow East) located about 300 metres (1,000 ft) west of the loop to the old station. The old Hounslow Town station and its two loop tracks were closed for good.

Piccadilly line services, which had been running as far as Northfields since January 1933, were extended to run to Hounslow West on 13 March 1933. The station was closed on 24 March 1934, to be replaced the following day by a new Osterley station at a location 300 m (1,000 ft) to the west on Great West Road. The stairways and platform awnings were removed in 1957, but the platforms and station buildings remain. Since 1967 the latter has been used as a bookshop.

== Bibliography ==
- Connor, J.E. (2006) [1999]. London's Disused Underground Stations (2nd ed.). Capital Transport. ISBN 1-85414-250-X.
- Horne, Mike (2006). The District Line: An Illustrated History. Capital Transport. ISBN 1-85414-292-5.
- Rose, Douglas (1999) [1980]. The London Underground, A Diagrammatic History (7th ed.). Douglas Rose/Capital Transport. ISBN 1-85414-219-4.

Former services
Preceding station	London Underground	Following station
Hounslow Town Terminus	District line Hounslow Town branch (1883–1884)	Boston Manor towards Mansion House
Hounslow Town Terminus	District line Hounslow Town branch (1884–1886)	Boston Manor towards Whitechapel
Hounslow Barracks Terminus	District line Hounslow West branch (1884–1886)	Boston Manor towards Whitechapel
Heston & Hounslow towards Hounslow Barracks	District line Hounslow West branch (1886–1902)	Boston Manor towards Whitechapel
Heston & Hounslow towards Hounslow Barracks	District line Hounslow West branch (1902–1905)	Boston Manor towards Upminster
Hounslow Town Terminus	District line Hounslow Town branch (1903–1905)	Boston Manor towards Upminster
Hounslow Town Terminus	District line Hounslow Town branch (1905–1908)	Boston Manor towards East Ham
Hounslow Town Terminus	District line Hounslow Town branch (1908–1909)	Boston Manor towards Barking
Hounslow East towards Hounslow West	District line Hounslow West branch (1909–1932)	Boston Manor towards Barking
Hounslow East towards Hounslow West	District line Hounslow West branch (1932–1934)	Boston Manor towards Upminster
Hounslow East towards Hounslow West	Piccadilly line (1933-34)	Boston Manor towards Cockfosters or Arnos Grove
