= Hounslow Central tube station =

London Underground station

Hounslow Central
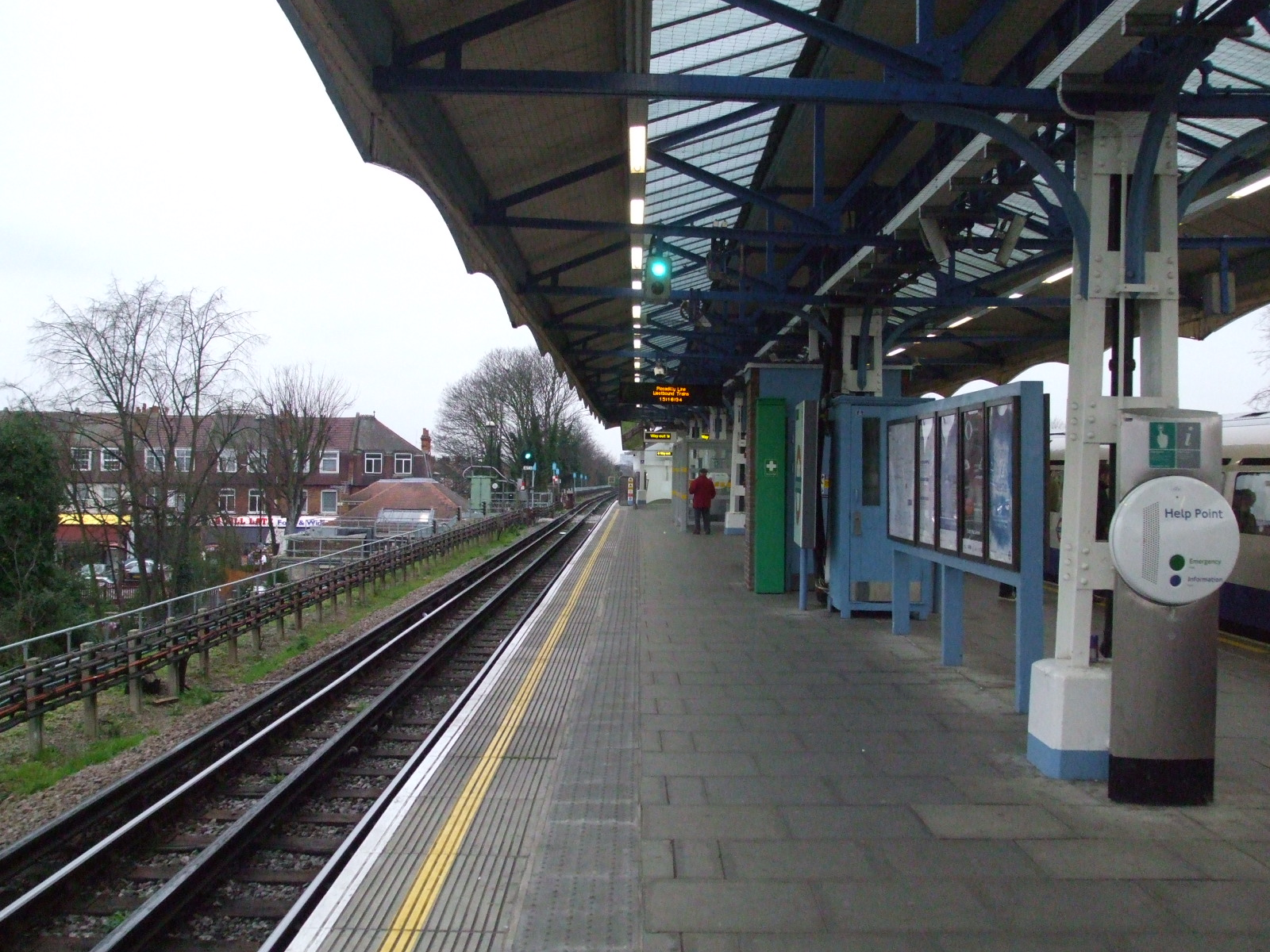
- Piccadilly line westbound platform at the station
- Interactive map of Hounslow Central

General information
- Location: Hounslow
- Local authority: London Borough of Hounslow
- Managed by: London Underground
- Number of platforms: 2
- Fare zone: 4

London Underground annual entry and exit
- 2020: ▼1.95 million
- 2021: ▼1.52 million
- 2022: ▲2.88 million
- 2023: ▲3.00 million
- 2024: ▲3.24 million

Key dates
- 21 July 1884: Track laid
- 1 April 1886: Opened (DR)
- 13 March 1933: Started (Piccadilly Line)
- 9 October 1964: Ended (District Line)

Other information
- External links: TfL station info page
- Coordinates: 51.47139°N 0.36639°W

Hounslow Central is a London Underground station in Hounslow in West London. It is on the Heathrow branch of the Piccadilly line, between Hounslow West and Hounslow East stations. The station is located on Lampton Road (A3005) about 500m north of Hounslow High Street and close to Lampton Park. It is in London fare zone 4. The station has an island platform reached by stairs. The station also has male and female toilets inside the ticket gateline.

== History ==
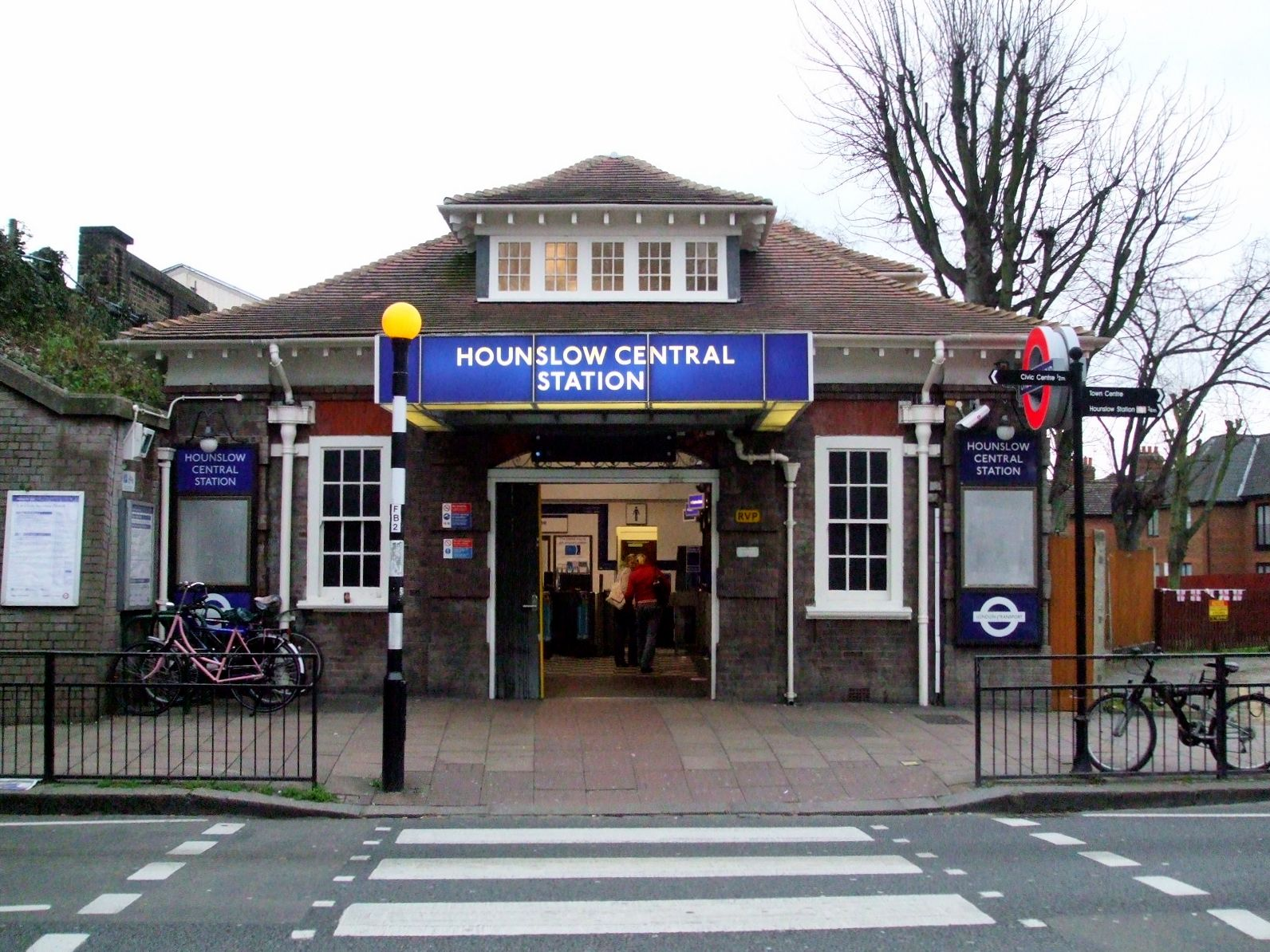
Hounslow Central station building

The route through Hounslow Central station was opened by the District Railway (DR, now the District line) on 21 July 1884 as a branch to Hounslow Barracks (now Hounslow West). The branch line was constructed as single track from the DR's existing route to Hounslow Town station located at the eastern end of Hounslow High Street which had opened in 1883. Initially the branch had no stations between the terminus at Hounslow Barracks and Osterley & Spring Grove (now Osterley).

Hounslow Town station was closed on 31 March 1886 and Hounslow Central station, originally named Heston & Hounslow, opened as its replacement the following day, 1 April 1886.

In 1903 Hounslow Town was reopened and trains would be divided at Osterley with part running to Hounslow Central and Hounslow West and the other part to Hounslow Town as a short shuttle. Electrification of the DR's tracks took place between 1903 and 1905 with electric trains replacing steam trains on the Hounslow branch from 13 June 1905. When the branch was electrified, the track between Osterley and Hounslow Central was closed and a new loop was opened from Hounslow Town back to Hounslow Central. Trains would run from Osterley to Hounslow Town then reverse and run to Hounslow Central and on to Hounslow West.

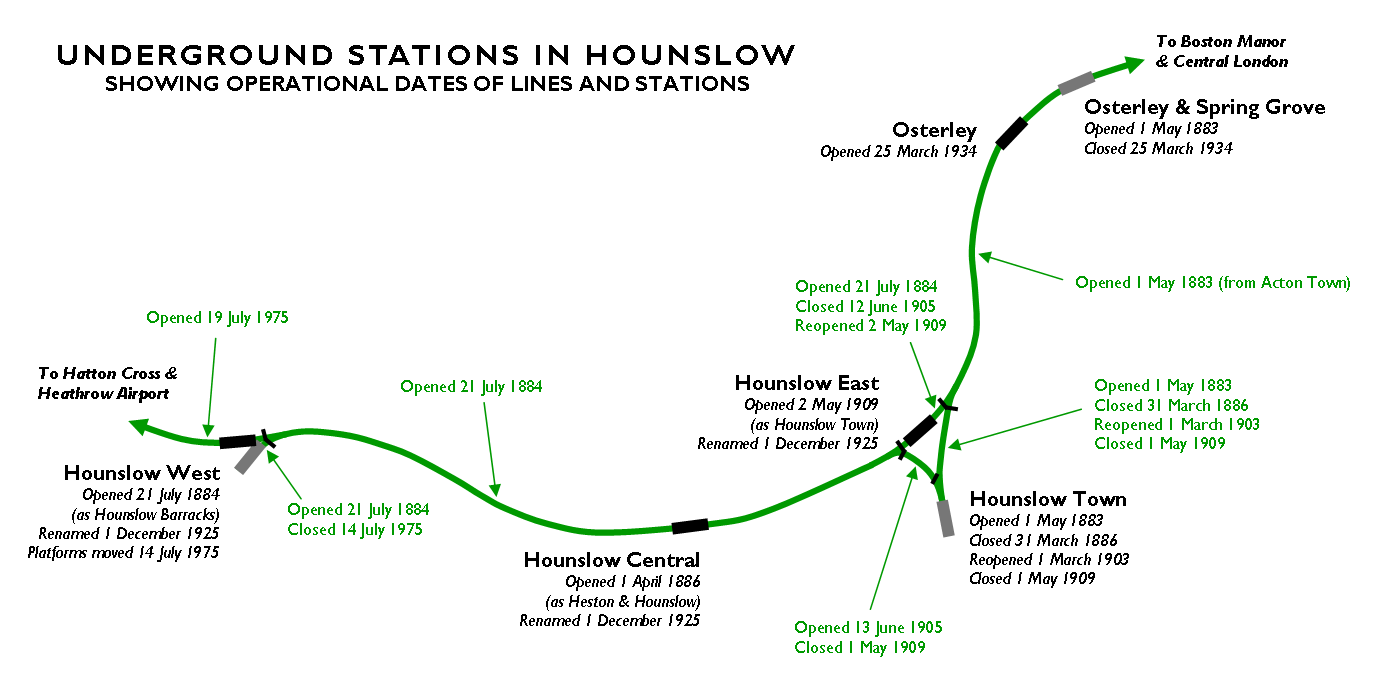
Map showing operational dates for lines and stations in Hounslow

This method of operation was unsuccessful and short-lived. On 2 May 1909 the track between Hounslow Central and Osterley was reopened and Hounslow Town and its two loop tracks were closed for good. A new Hounslow Town station (now Hounslow East) was opened at the same time between Hounslow Central and Osterley.

On 19 October 1912 new station buildings were opened at Hounslow Central and on 1 December 1925 the station was given its present name at the same time that Hounslow West and Hounslow East received their current names. Piccadilly line services, which had been running as far as Northfields since January 1933 were extended to run to Hounslow West on 13 March 1933. From this date, the branch was operated jointly by both lines until District line services were withdrawn on 9 October 1964.

== Connections ==
London Buses routes 120 and H20 serve the station.

Preceding station	London Underground	Following station
Hounslow West towards Heathrow Airport (Terminal 4 or Terminal 5)	Piccadilly line Heathrow branch	Hounslow East towards Cockfosters or Arnos Grove
Former services
Preceding station	London Underground	Following station
Hounslow Barracks Terminus	District line Hounslow West branch (1886-1905)	Osterley & Spring Grove towards Upminster
Hounslow Barracks Terminus	District line Hounslow West branch (1905-09)	Hounslow Town towards Upminster
Hounslow West Terminus	District line Hounslow West branch (1909-1964)	Hounslow East towards Upminster
