= South Ealing tube station =

London Underground station

South Ealing
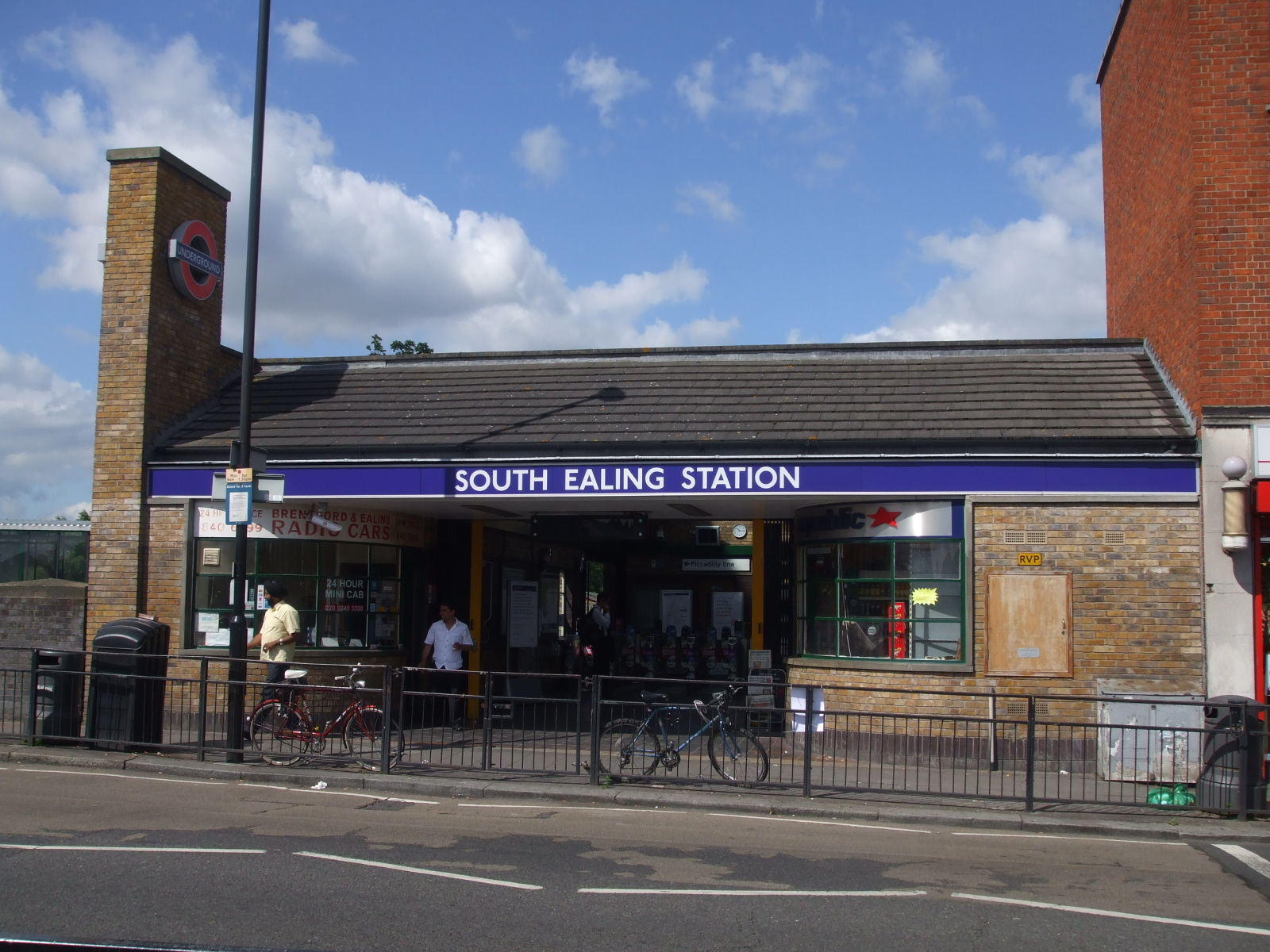
- Station entrance
- Interactive map of South Ealing

General information
- Location: Ealing
- Local authority: London Borough of Ealing
- Managed by: London Underground
- Number of platforms: 4
- Fare zone: 3

London Underground annual entry and exit
- 2020: ▼1.63 million
- 2021: ▼1.50 million
- 2022: ▲2.51 million
- 2023: ▼1.66 million
- 2024: ▲2.24 million

Railway companies
- Original company: District Railway

Key dates
- 1 May 1883: Station opened
- 9 January 1933: Piccadilly line service introduced
- 1964: District line service withdrawn

Other information
- External links: TfL station info page
- Coordinates: 51.50111°N 0.30722°W

South Ealing is a London Underground station in the London Borough of Ealing. It is on the Heathrow branch of the Piccadilly line, between Northfields and Acton Town stations. The station is located on South Ealing Road, and is in London fare zone 3.

== History ==
South Ealing station was opened as a stop on the District Railway (later the District line) on 1 May 1883. These trains were initially steam-powered, but the line has been electrified since 1905.

The station has been served by the Piccadilly line since 9 January 1933. It was modernised between 1935 and 1936, with the original buildings replaced, the eastbound platform receiving a new concrete canopy and waiting room and electric lights being installed.

The District line service was withdrawn in 1964.

The station building was again replaced in 1983. It was refurbished once more in 2006.

== Station information ==
South Ealing tube station has a waiting room.

The station does not offer step-free access from the train or platform to street level.

Like all other London Underground stations, South Ealing has a Labyrinth artwork by Mark Wallinger, in place since 2013.

== Connections ==
London Buses route 65 and night route N65 serve the station directly, with routes E3 and N11 stopping nearby.

Preceding station	London Underground	Following station
Northfields towards Heathrow Airport (Terminal 4 or Terminal 5)	Piccadilly line Heathrow branch	Acton Town towards Cockfosters or Arnos Grove
Former services
Preceding station	London Underground	Following station
Boston Manor towards Hounslow Town or Hounslow Barracks	District line (1883–1908)	Acton Town towards Whitechapel or Upminster
Northfields towards Hounslow Town or Hounslow West	District line (1908–1964)	Acton Town towards Upminster
