= Boston Manor House =

Historic house museum

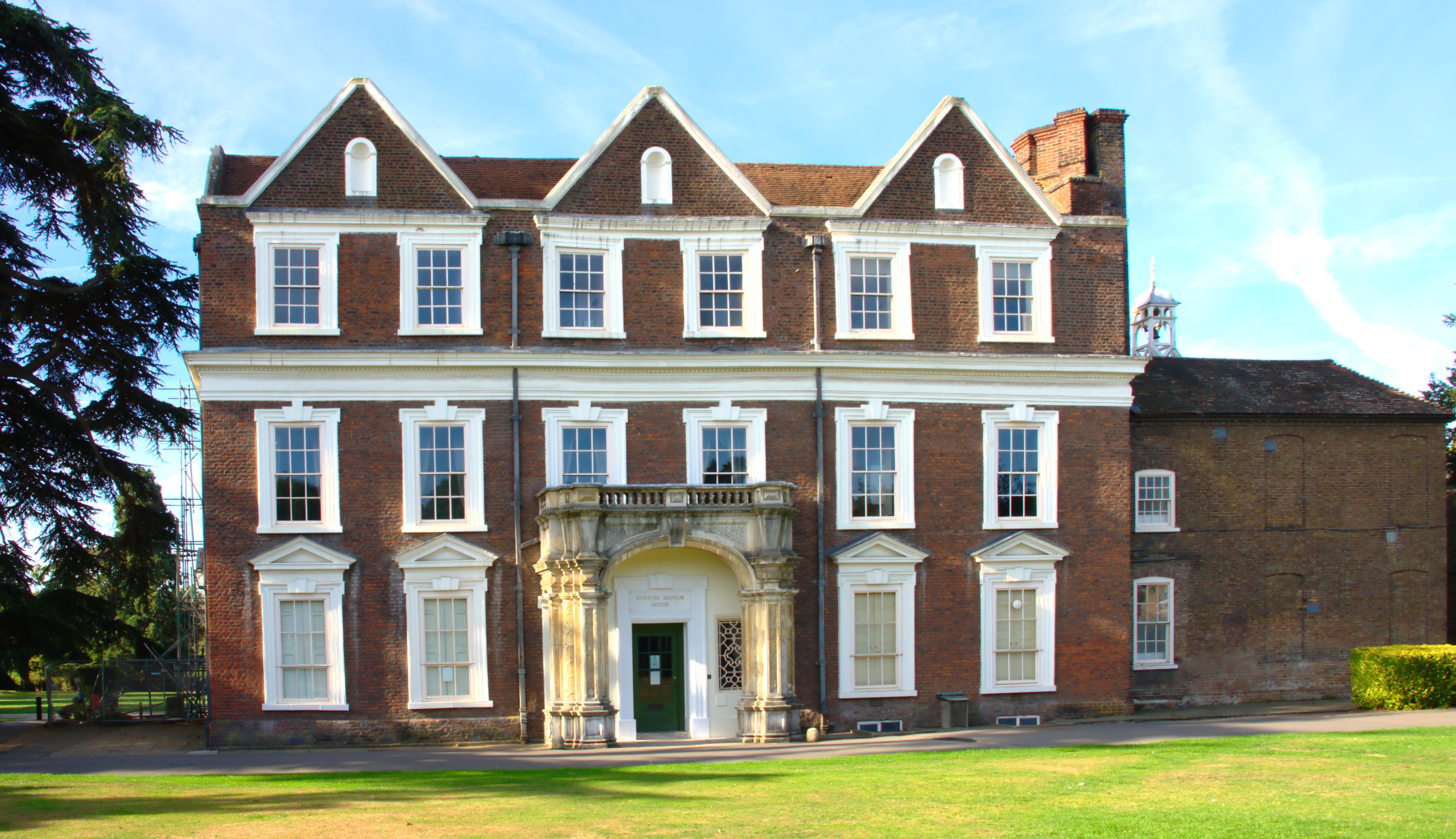
- Front view of Boston Manor House

- Location within London Borough of Hounslow
- 51°29′31″N 0°19′06″W
- Type: Manor house
- Location: Brentford
- OS grid reference: TQ 16839 78339

History
- Built: 1622

Site notes
- Area: Greater London
- Architectural style: Jacobean
- Owner: London Borough of Hounslow

Listed Building – Grade I
- Official name: Boston Manor House, Boston Manor Park
- Designated: 11 July 1951
- Reference no.: 1079603

Boston Manor House is an English Jacobean manor house built in 1622 with internal alterations, intensively restored in later centuries. It was the manor house of one of the early medieval-founded manors in Middlesex. Since 1965 the manor's small part of the parish of Hanwell has been part of the London Borough of Hounslow in west London. Boston Manor Park is the publicly owned green space, including a lake, which adjoins the house.

== History of the former manor of Boston ==
The earliest reference to Boston (or Bordwadestone as it was then spelled) was around the 1170s. Bordwad has not been identified with a group of people or physical feature and so it is assumed the first part of this word means Bord's. The final part of the word is the common ending /tən/ i.e. farmstead. It was towards the northern end its lands — its manor. The Lord of the manor is recorded as Ralph de Brito. There is no record as to where he built his manor house. He founded a chapel dedicated to St. Lawrence in the south of the manor on a site that is now derelict. The ecclesiastical boundary under this chapel was — or became over time — conterminous with the manor boundary. The approximate four boundaries were the Piccadilly line from the east end of Boston Manor Underground station's sidings to the Brent, the Brent down to the Thames, the Thames to Half Acre Road, and Boston Manor Road.

The northern extent of the manor was marked by a boundary stone. Later a tree to the west of it came to be the local Gospel Oak. Here the old pagan custom of blessing the field and crops took place whilst beating the bounds. Thus, the boundary of chapelry of St. Lawrence coexisted with that of the manor. It was a part of the parish of Hanwell until moved into Brentford.

Then in about 1280, Edward I granted this area of the township to the prioress of St Helen's Bishopsgate. It is at this point Boston became a recognised rural settlement. (Note: Under the feudal system, lands could be divided up by use, ownership, possession (right to take profit), and occupancy.) The prioress received what amounted to "constructive possession" and ownership. The King did this to make raising tax easier and it had the benefit of deterring alienation of part, a process then called subinfeudation, keeping the land together until the dissolution of the monasteries.

The King may have favoured this particular Convent in Bishopsgate because it was full of the unmarried daughters of members of the Guild of Goldsmiths, and so by making them self-supporting by giving them the means to charge their new tenants rents and to sell the produce grown on their newly acquired demesne, he could justify taxing their fathers more heavily and collect the tax in the form of silver coinage, which was more convenient.

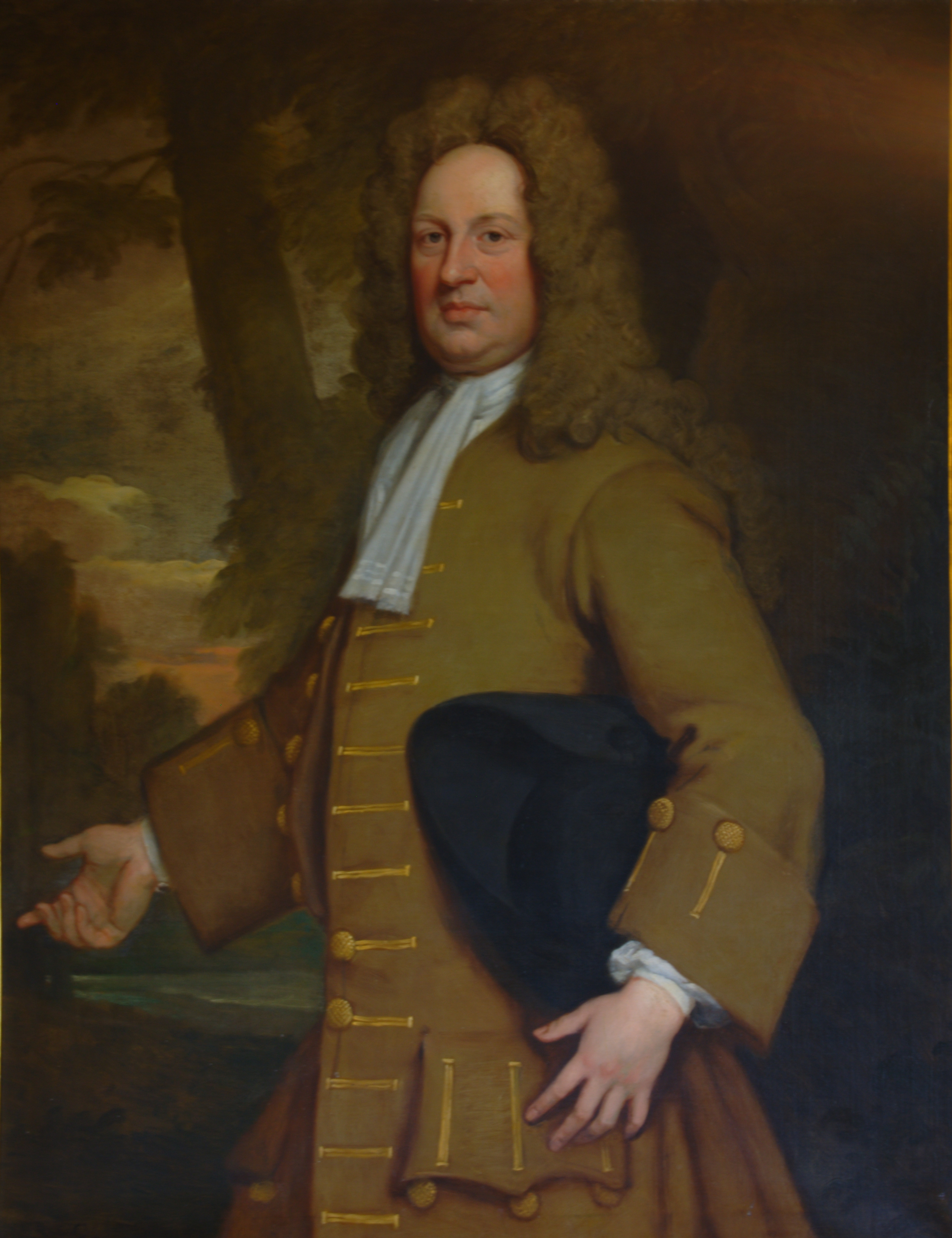
Christopher Clitherow (1666–1727) by Godfrey Kneller 3rd owner of Boston Manor House

In 1539, Henry VIII's national reforms saw the convent dissolved and the manor (including its holdings) returned to the Crown.

The Crown granted the lands in or shortly before 1547 to Edward Seymour, 1st Duke of Somerset during the reign of Edward VI.

When the Duke was beheaded, his lands were forfeited under the Counter-Reformation of Mary I to The Crown until Elizabeth I granted it to her favourite Robert Dudley, 1st Earl of Leicester who immediately sold it to Sir Thomas Gresham, an internationally wealthy merchant and financier who had also bought Osterley as his summer residence. He later founded the Royal Exchange.

As Gresham died without issue, the property went to his stepson Sir William Reade who lived in Osterley so had to obtain a Patent of Possession in 1610 from James I so that he could inherit. He married Mary Goldsmith, who immediately after his death built Boston Manor House in 1622–1623. She then married Sir Edward Spencer of Althorp, who therefore gained the equitable ownership and who appears to have bought out the claim of the late William Reade's heirs so that upon her death in 1658 the lands passed to her heir John Goldsmith. In 1670 his executors sold Boston to another very wealthy city merchant: James Clitherow I. The price he paid for the house with its then 230 acres (0.93 km^{2}) for his own use, was £5,136, 17s, 4d (equivalent to £989,000 in 2025).

The manor was gradually reduced by the Clitherow family for the next 250 years. The neighbouring settlement of Brentford expanded onto the property of this manor, which largely became known as the Manor of New Brentford.

The population had grown so much by 1621 that the chapelry council assumed administrative township status known as the New Brentford Township — the letters NBT can be seen on local boundary stones.

During the 18th century the area was referred to overwhelmingly as Boston Manor in preference to New Brentford.

John Bourchier Stracey-Clitherow was the last private owner of the manor. In 1923 he sold the final part of the estate: the house and 20 acres (8.1 ha) purchased by the Brentford Urban District Council and opened as a public park in 1924.

The Green Flag Award scheme, which recognises and rewards the best green spaces in England and Wales, has given this award to Boston Manor Park in 2005, 2006, 2007, 2008 and 2009.

== Boston Manor House ==
=== History of the manor house ===
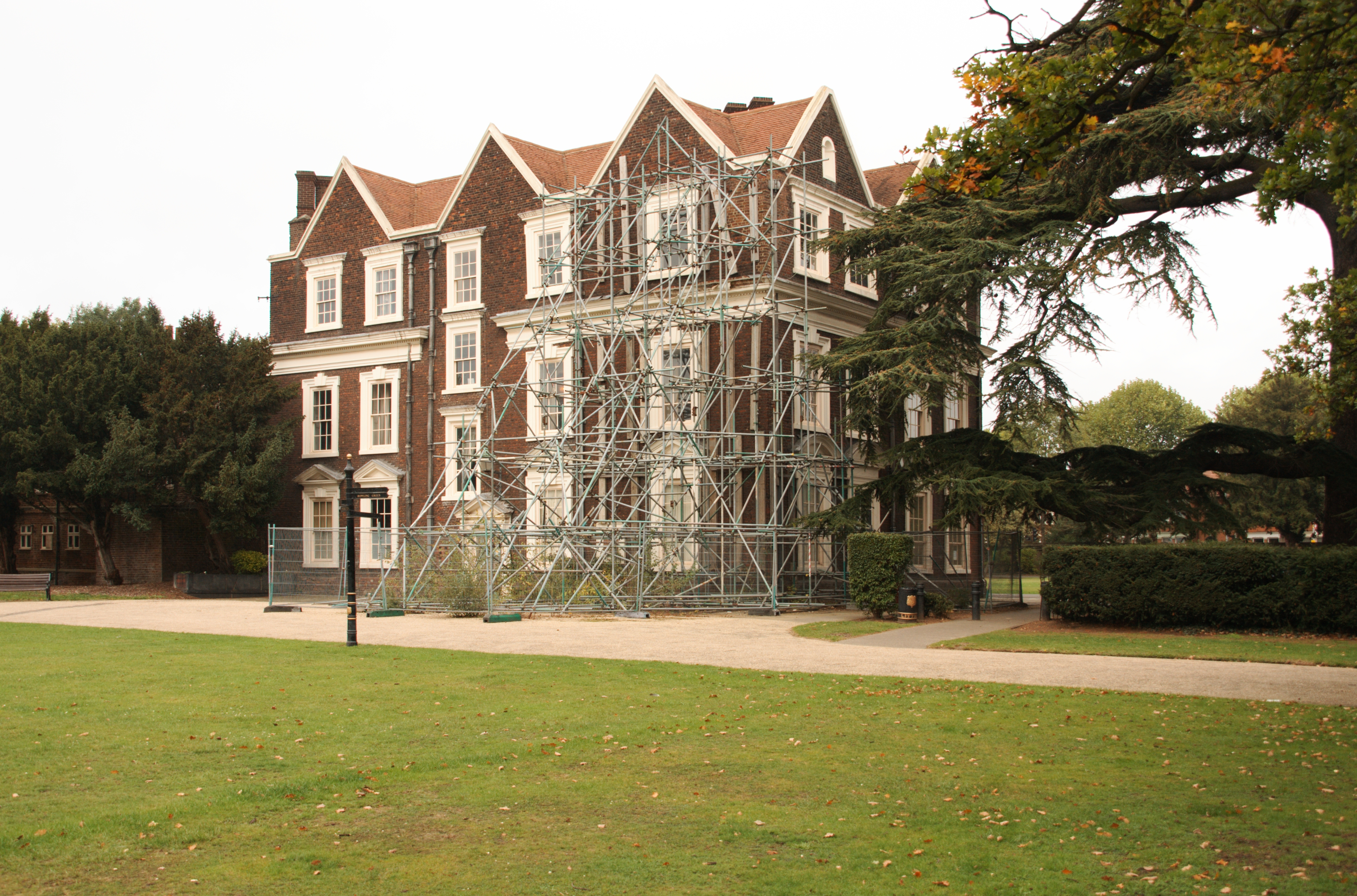
The unsafe south west corner

The manor house was built in 1622-3 for the newly widowed, and shortly to be remarried Dame Mary Reade, whose late husband was granted a patent of possession for Boston Manor from James I. To the north of the house the Clitherow family added extensions that contained the kitchen services and quarters for the domestic staff.

John Bourchier Stracey-Clitherow was the last private owner of Boston Manor House, which he sold in 1923. The house and the surrounding 20 acres (8.1 ha) was purchased by the Brentford Urban District Council, and was opened as a public park in 1924.

The house was badly damaged during World War II by a V1 dropping across the road. For a time it was used as a school. After extensive restoration work, it was re-opened in 1963 by Queen Elizabeth The Queen Mother as a visitor centre and museum.

Due to its unique architecture and decoration it has been often used as a setting for period films.

There came a time when the south west corner was propped up by scaffolding intended to be a temporary measure but which became a feature for several years. English Heritage judged that urgent work was needed in order to consolidate the foundations to prevent further deterioration and possible collapse. The lower courses of brickwork were visibly bowing out and a vertical crack could be seen running up the wall. This has since been repaired.

An organisation called the Friends of Boston Manor now exists with the aim of helping to restore and maintain the historical aspects of Boston Manor Park and House.

Following six years of renovation, the house reopened to the public on 7 July 2023.

=== Description of the house ===
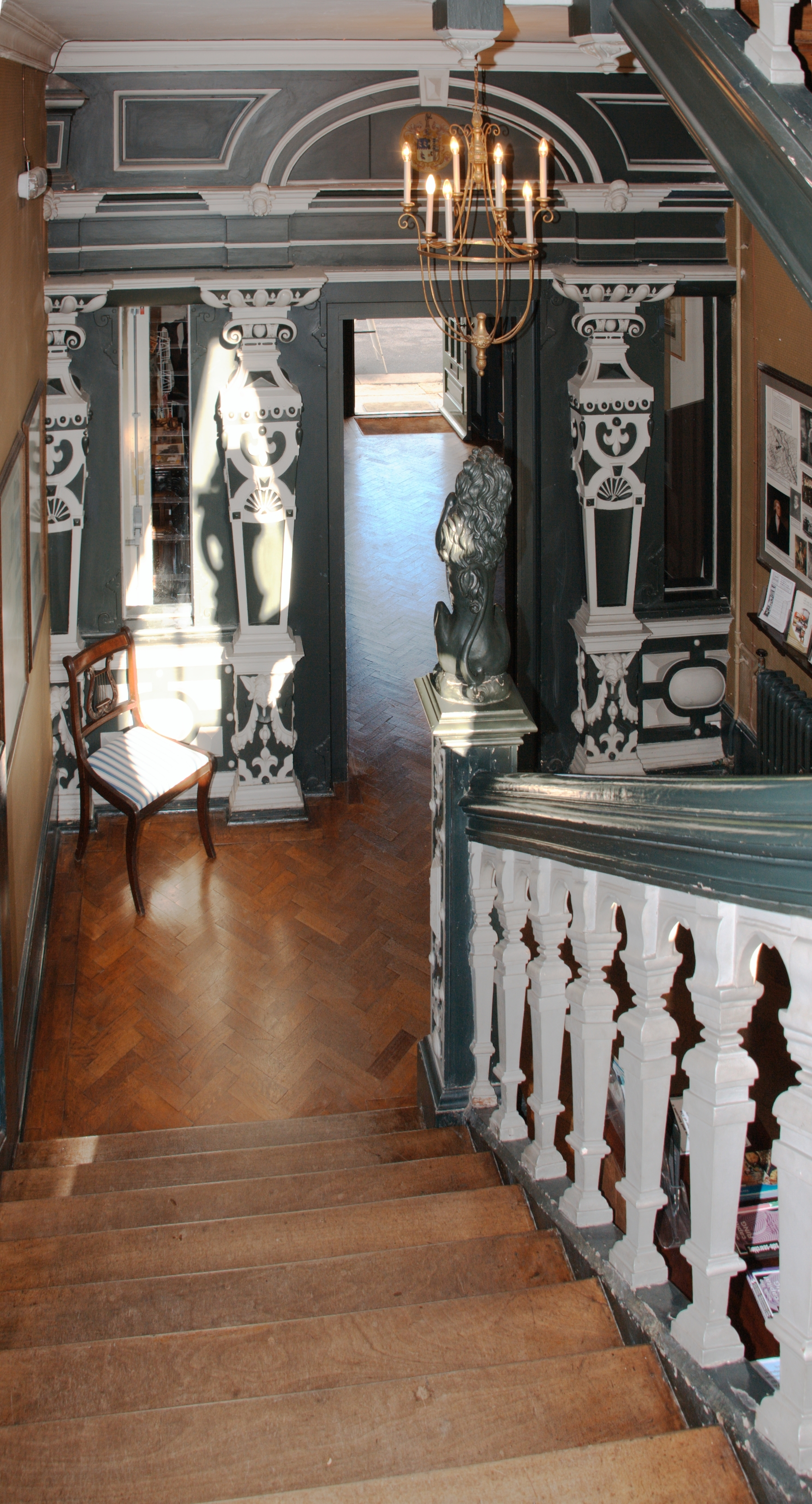
Jacobean staircase

The manor house is a Grade I listed Jacobean manor house on the west-side of Boston Manor Road, Brentford, in the London Borough of Hounslow, England. Set in 20 acres (8.1 ha) of parkland, it is Hounslow's only building of the Jacobean period. It is situated in beautiful grounds which gently slope down to the nearby River Brent, from which Brentford gets its name. The house has thick walls of red brick and stands three storeys high. The windows are set into stone architraves and a stone cornice between the second and third storeys of the house. It has three gables on the longer sides and two on the shorter with stone coping. The rainwater downpipe headers which collect from the roof gutters are each embossed with dates. The three on the original part of the house are dated 1662, this being the date that building began. Another is 1670, which was when the third gable was added, and 1915 for when improvements were made to the drainage system.

It was traditional with grand houses of this time to consider the front side of the house to be that side which looks out over an elegantly landscaped garden. However, during the ownership of James Clitherow (IV), the central ground floor window on the east side was converted into a doorway and a porch was added. It is fashioned from pale grit stone which has weathered to an almost light golden colour, with Elizabethan detail, and topped with a low ornamental balustrade. Considering its design and apparent age, it is thought to have been salvaged from another building.

Going through this porch and the new front doorway one comes into the entrance hall. It extends to the west side of the house and the former front door. Halfway between, however, is a wooden divide or screen which was added around the 19th century, and the east half was given a new ceiling. On the immediate left of the hall is the dining room. It is not very large and is painted in a bright yellow which was both popular and expensive when it was in fashion. It has a number of prints and paintings hanging on the walls of local scenes from times gone by.

Once back in the hallway and walking through the screen, there is to the left-hand side a door to the library, which is about the same size as the dining room. It has some interesting features. The room is now locked and cannot be seen by visitors due to the dangerous condition of the wall on that side of the house. Beyond the library door is the west side door to the garden.

The west side of the hall also has a mostly original left hand winding Jacobean staircase. The angle of ascent (or rake) of the stairs is gentler than in modern buildings, with both a lower ‘rise’ to the next tread and deeper ‘run’ to the next step. The treads are bullnosed and obediently creak to each and every footfall a visitor may place upon them. Square carved oak newel posts support the ends of banisters with carved tapered balusters running between. The opposite side of the stairs are mirrored with a Trompe d'œil balustrade. For this period in England, this is an extremely rare example of this technique and so is now been preserved behind transparent sheets. The design has striking similarities to those at Hatfield House.

A 19th-century addition to the top of the newel posts are small plaster or composition castings of lions which are sitting on their haunches, with their bodies erect and both forepaws raised from the ground (i.e., holding ‘sejant erect attitude’), Each animal hold a shield bearing the arms of a different Clitherow member. These may have been added for the visit of King William IV and Queen Adelaide; for although the Clitherows were commoners they could nevertheless trace their family tree back to the reign of Henry V.

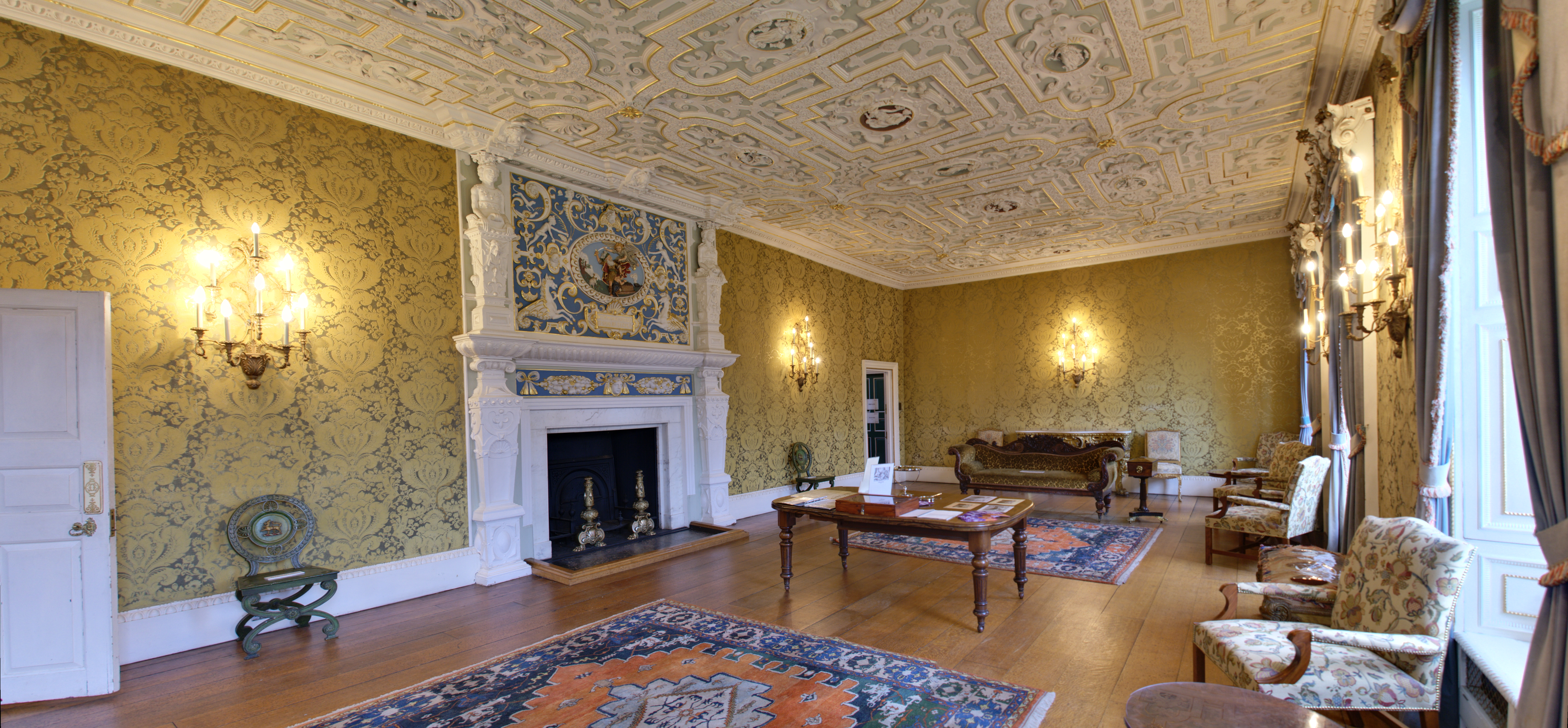
The State Drawing room

After the second flight of stairs one arrives at the second floor. To the right is the door to a small anteroom on the west side of the house. Next to this is the state bedroom with a splendid Jacobean decorated plaster ceiling in high relief. The central panel depicts a female figure representing ‘Hope’ with her cross-anchor; below is the word in Latin. This symbol pre-dates Christianity: Which hope we have as an anchor of the soul, both sure and stedfast, and which entereth into that within the veil; Hebrews 6:19 (KJV). Despite this, Dame Mary Reade died childless.

From here and though the doorway to the east side is the state drawing room; so called because this is where the ladies would withdraw after dinner, leaving the menfolk to smoke and sample the cellar. Boston Manor House is famous for this room: it is large, with a high and magnificent Jacobean ceiling, with some elements designed by the 17th-century Dutch artist Marcus Gheeraerts, and engraved by Galle. In one corner is recorded the date of building, and Mary Reade's initials in another. An equally ornate chimney-piece over the mantel is based on a print by the Flemish-born engraver Abraham de Bruyn which depicts Abraham about to sacrifice Isaac on the Mount of Moriah. These high relief mouldings are all acknowledged to be excellent examples of the Jacobean period.

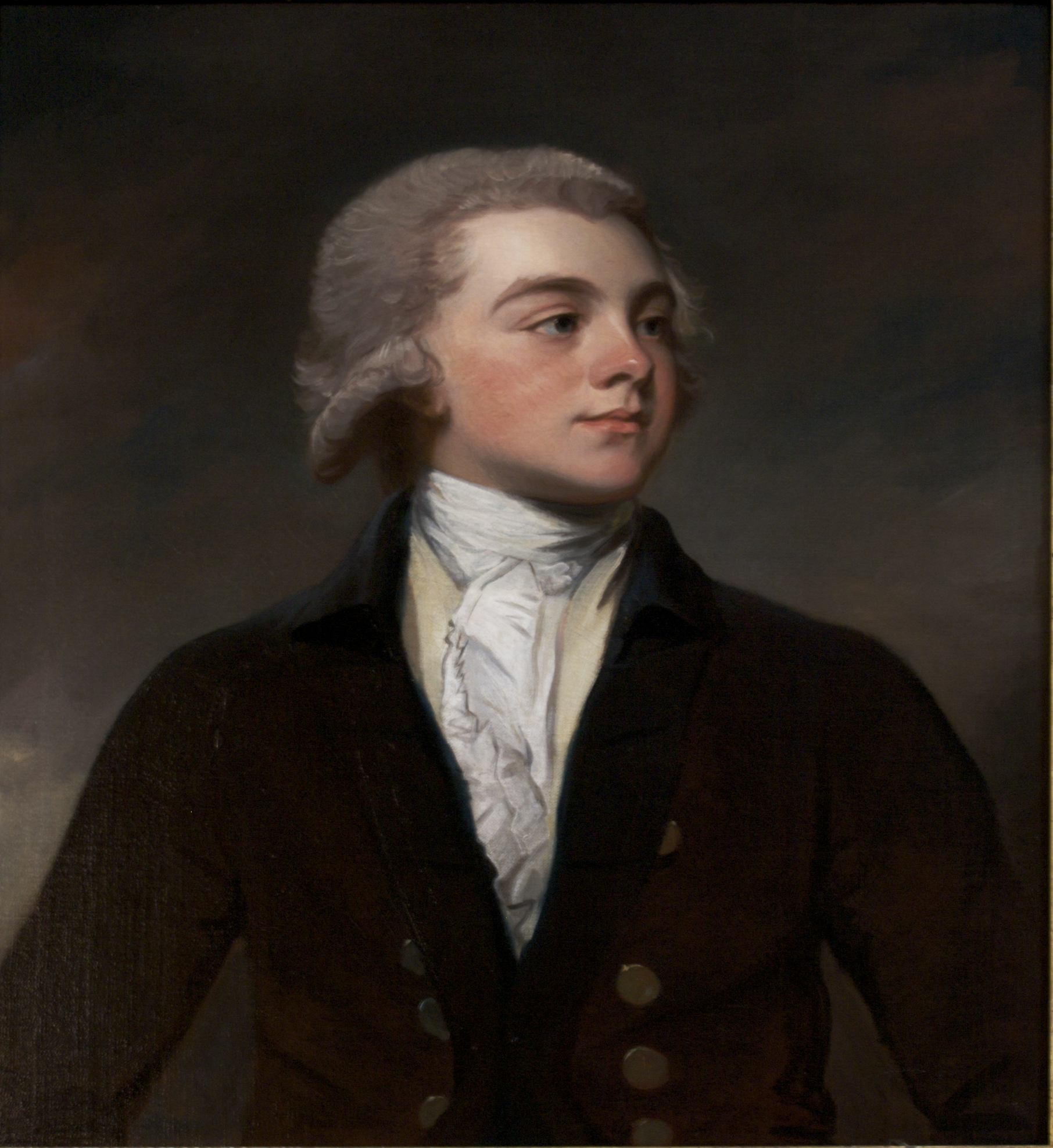
James Clitherow (1731–1805) by George Romney

On the wall along the final top flight of stairs can be seen some 18th-century wallpaper, which was discovered during restoration work. While it has become distressed with time, it is considered to be among the best examples which have survived into present times.

Like most houses that have served as homes, when necessary it has been improved and modernised, by the Clitherow family. The original windows were replaced by box-sash and unfolding wooden panels or screens. These would be unfurled across the windows at dusk to keep in the heat, as well as keeping the house more secure. Central heating was also installed, as was gas for the kitchens.

The wall have been hung with hand-printed flock wallpaper. Much of the furniture in the house has been lent by the Gunnersbury Park Museum.

The art collection includes an oil on canvas of Christopher Clitherow by Godfrey Kneller; oils of Syon House and Isleworth by James Isaiah Lewis; an oil of James Clitherow (1766–1841) by Henry William Pickersgill; and an oil of James Clitherow (1731–1805) by George Romney.

=== Park opening hours and events ===
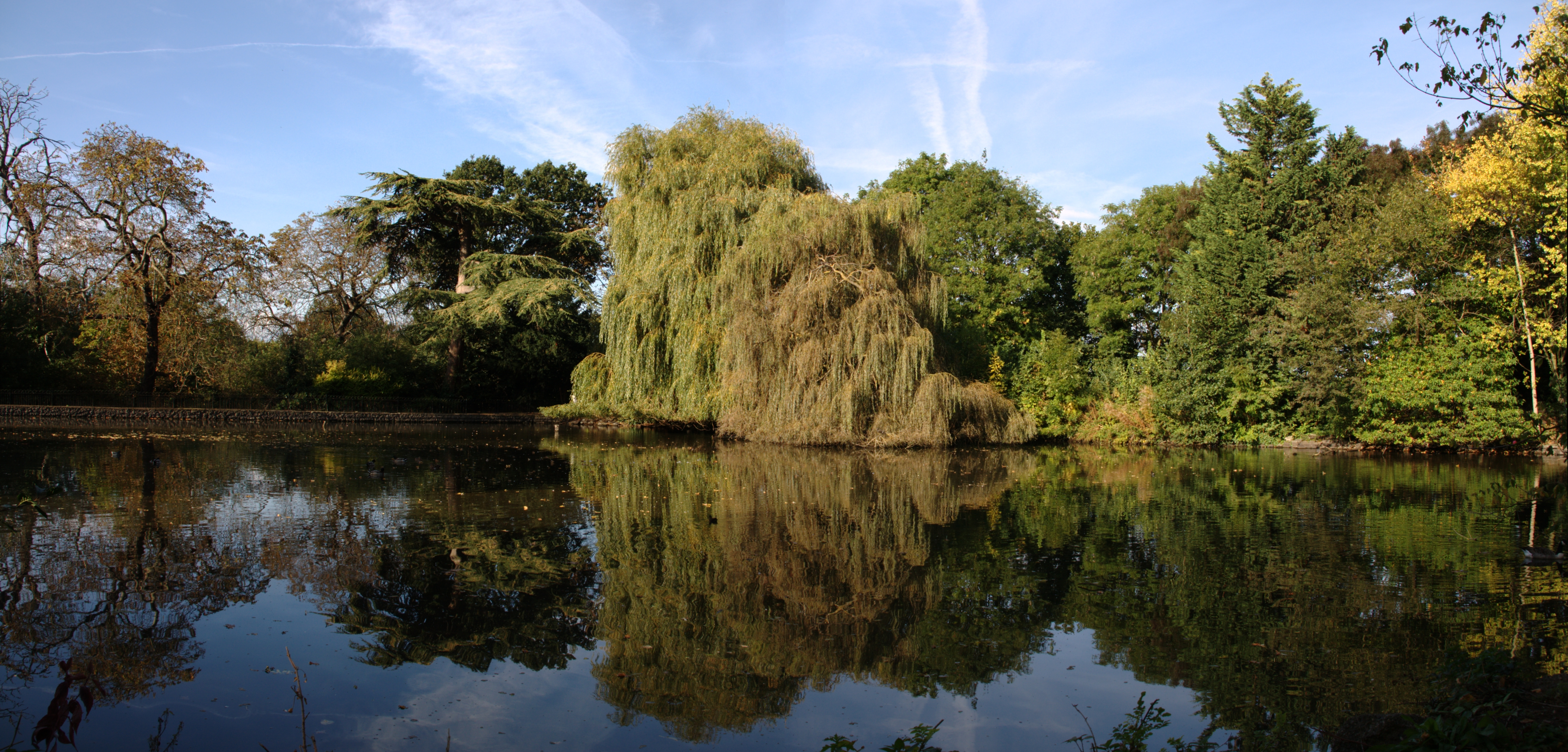
The ornamental lake

The park is free and open to the public every day: 8am-dusk It has a modern and fully equipped children's playground, plus 3 tennis courts, and a basketball court. Friends of Boston Manor volunteers run a cafeteria at weekends. Recently a Nature Trail has been laid out. There are formal lawns and an ornamental lake with wildfowl. Car boot sales are held on the first Saturday of every month from 9 a.m. to 1 p.m.

=== Other historic neighbours ===
Boston Manor House is surrounded by other historic neighbours. To the northwest lies Southall Manor House which is 3.7 miles (6.0 km) away. To the north is Pitzhanger Manor House & Gallery which is 2.3 miles (3.7 km) away. To the northeast is Gunnersbury Park Museum which is 2.6 miles (4.2 km) away. To the west is Osterley Park House which is 2.8 miles (4.5 km) away. To the east is Chiswick House which is 3.4 miles (5.5 km) away. To the south are Syon House which is 2.3 miles (3.7 km) away, Kew Palace which is 3 miles (4.8 km) away, and Ham House 6.8 miles (10.9 km) away.

== Transport and locale ==
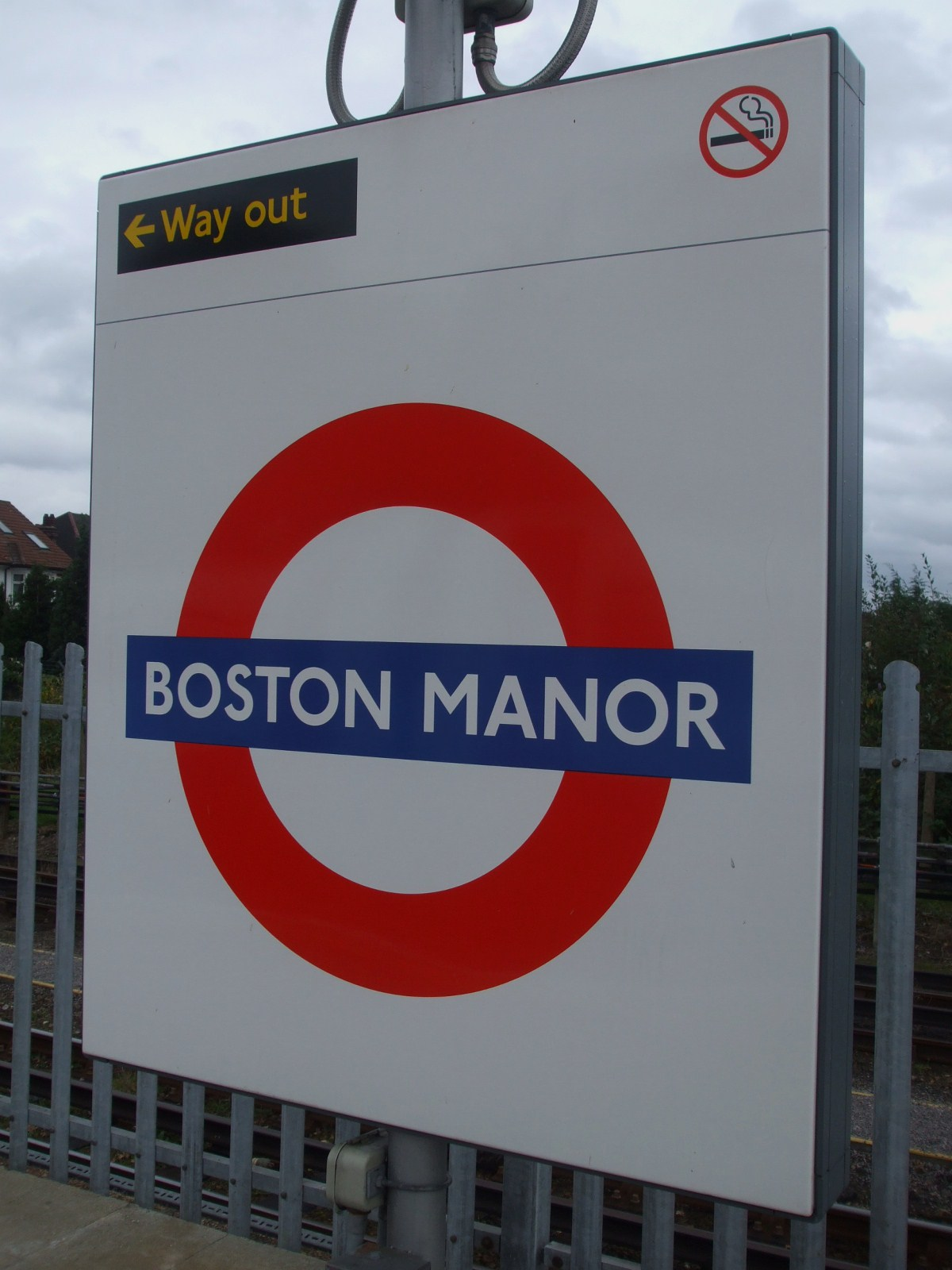
London Underground roundel of the Boston Manor station

Two London Buses serve the area; the 195 and the E8. The area's local London Underground station is Boston Manor, served by Piccadilly line trains.

Its post town is TW8 BRENTFORD, in the TW postcode area.

The M4 motorway overpass runs through Boston Manor Park.

== Popular culture ==
Boston Manor is featured in the song Girl VII on the album Foxbase Alpha by UK pop band Saint Etienne.

== Bibliography ==
- Daniel Lysons, The Environs of London (1795–1800)
- Montague Sharpe, Bregantforda and the Hanweal (1904); Some Accounts of Bygone Hanwell and its Chapelry of New Brentford. Brentford Printing and Publishing Coy., Ltd. London. UK.
- Arthur Oswald, 1965, "Boston Manor House" Country Life 18 March 1965, 63–7
- Janet McNamara, Boston Manor Brentford – A History and Guide
- Cyrill Neaves, A history of Greater Ealing. S. R. Publishers 1971. ISBN 0-85409-679-5
