= Hounslow East tube station =

London Underground station

Hounslow East
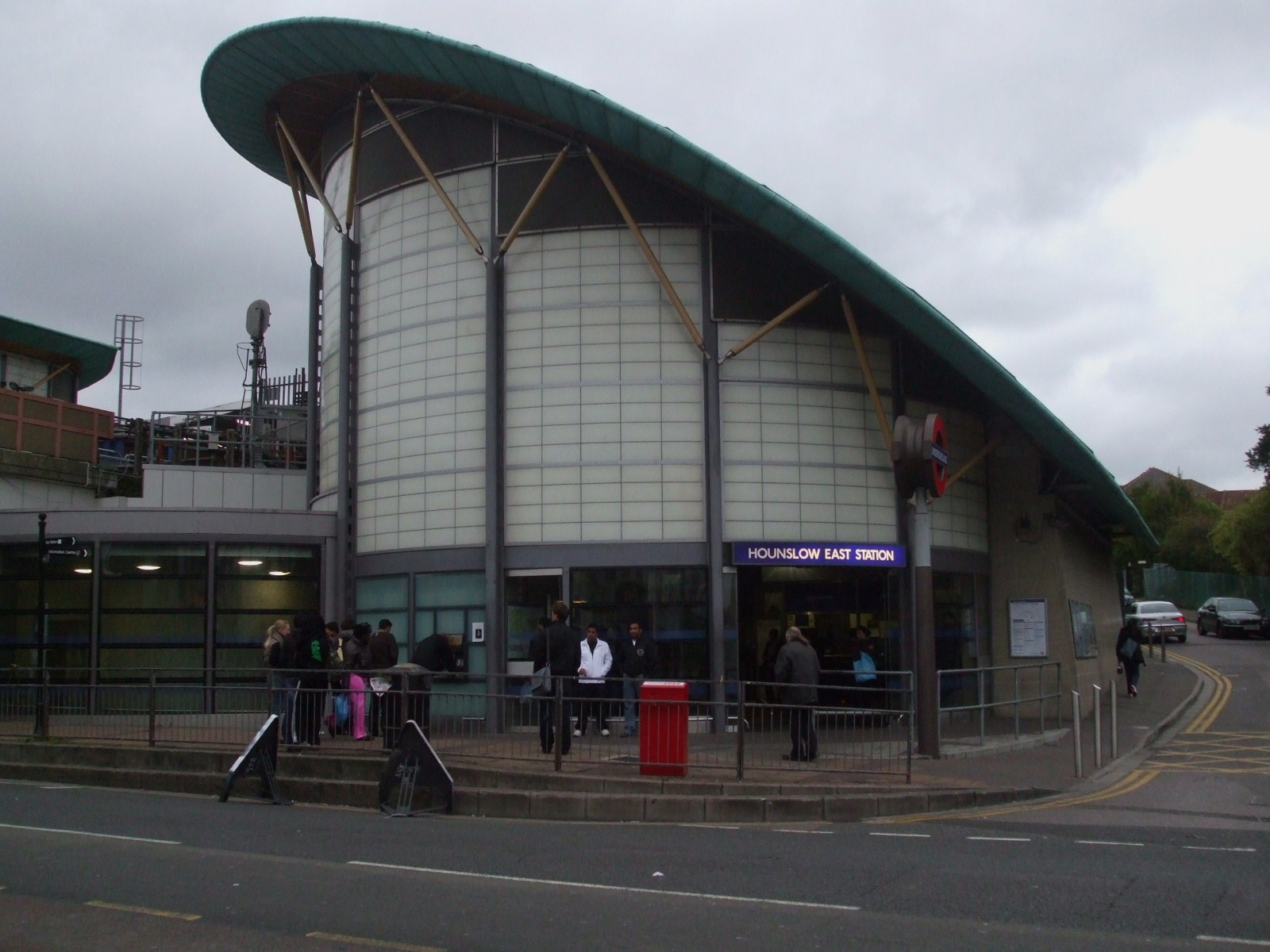
- Hounslow East station
- Interactive map of Hounslow East

General information
- Location: Hounslow
- Local authority: London Borough of Hounslow
- Managed by: London Underground
- Number of platforms: 2
- Accessible: Yes
- Fare zone: 4

London Underground annual entry and exit
- 2021: ▼1.77 million
- 2022: ▲3.22 million
- 2023: ▲3.37 million
- 2024: ▼3.32 million
- 2025: ▼3.15 million

Key dates
- 21 July 1884: Track laid (DR)
- 2 May 1909: Opened (District line)
- 13 March 1933: Start (Piccadilly line)
- 9 October 1964: End (District line)

Other information
- External links: TfL station info page
- Coordinates: 51.4730°N 0.3563°W

Hounslow East is a London Underground station in Hounslow, in the London Borough of Hounslow. It is on the Heathrow branch of the Piccadilly line, between Hounslow Central and Osterley stations. The station is located on Kingsley Road and is in London fare zone 4. It is situated 10.5 miles (16.9 km) west-southwest of Charing Cross.

== History ==
The route through Hounslow East station was opened by the District Railway (DR, now the District line) on 21 July 1884 as a branch to Hounslow Barracks (now Hounslow West). The branch line was constructed as single track from the DR's existing route to Hounslow Town station located at the eastern end of Hounslow High Street where the bus garage is now located. That station had opened in 1883. Initially the branch to Hounslow Barracks had no stations between there and Osterley & Spring Grove (replaced by Osterley in 1934).

Hounslow Town station was closed on 31 March 1886 and Heston & Hounslow station (now Hounslow Central), opened as its replacement the following day, 1 April 1886.

In 1903 Hounslow Town station was reopened and trains would be divided at Osterley & Spring Grove station, with part running to Hounslow West and the other part to Hounslow Town as a short shuttle. Electrification of the DR's tracks took place between 1903 and 1905 with electric trains replacing steam trains on the Hounslow branch from 13 June 1905. When the branch was electrified, the track between Osterley & Spring Grove station and Hounslow Central was closed and a new loop was opened from Hounslow Town back to Hounslow Central. Trains would run from Osterley to Hounslow Town then reverse and run over the new loop to reach the main line and so continue to Hounslow West.

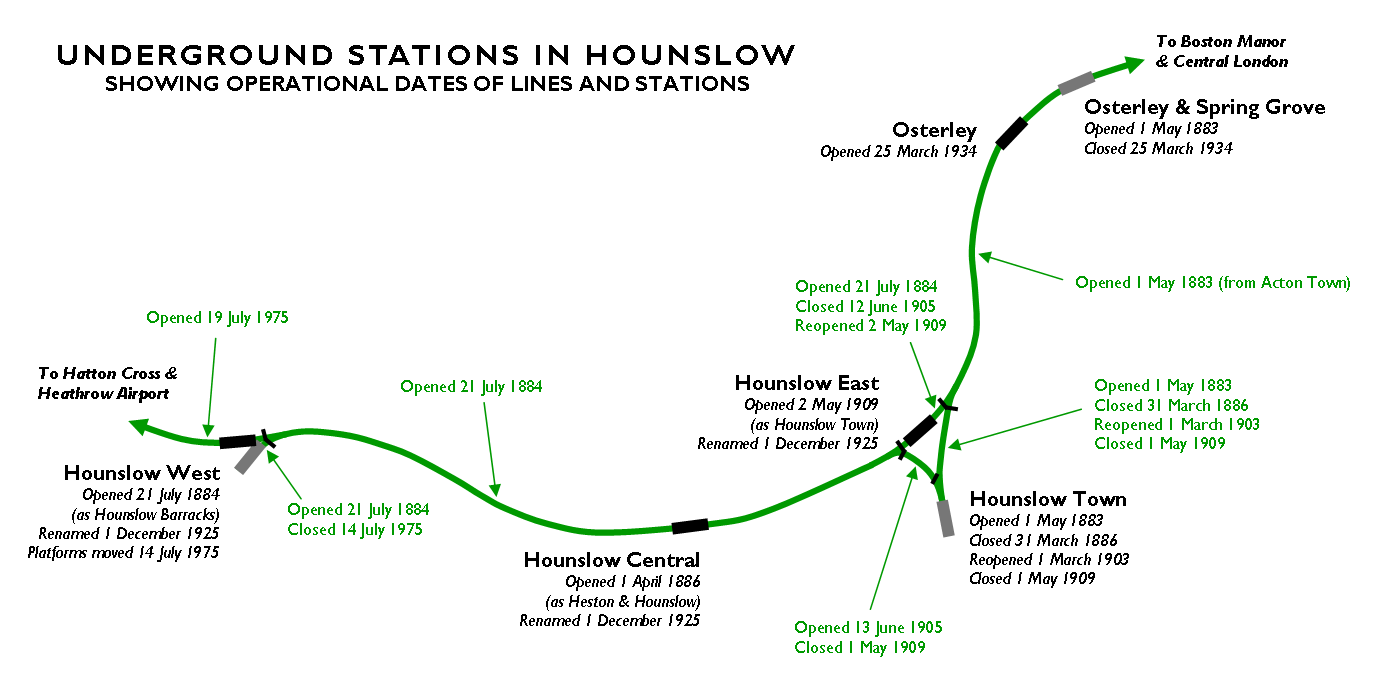
Map showing operational dates for lines and stations in Hounslow

This method of operation was unsuccessful and short-lived. On 2 May 1909 the track between Heston & Hounslow station (now Hounslow Central) and Osterley & Spring Grove station was reopened with Hounslow East station (initially called Hounslow Town) as a new station located about 300 m (350 yd) west of the loop to the old station. The old Hounslow Town station and its two loop tracks were closed for good. Part of the embankment that carried the original single track to Hounslow Town Station (now Hounslow Bus garage) is still visible, just east of Hounslow East station.

On 1 December 1925 the station was given its present name at the same time that Hounslow West and Hounslow Central received their current names.

Piccadilly Line services, which had been running as far as Northfields since January 1933 were extended to run to Hounslow West on 13 March 1933. From this date, the branch was operated jointly by both lines until District Line services were withdrawn on 9 October 1964.

New station buildings, to designs by Acanthus Lawrence and Wrightson Architects, have now replaced the old ones. Phase 1 of the scheme, which was completed in July 2002, required the excavation of the existing embankment and provided a new ticket hall with ancillary staff accommodation, interchange passageway and stairs to each platform. The second phase which involved the construction of the eastbound platform building, with a striking green roof, completed early 2003. As part of the works lifts have been provided to both platforms.

Staff frequently play classical music on the PA system as part of an experiment to discourage anti-social activities at the station.

== Services ==
Hounslow East station is on the Heathrow branch of the Piccadilly line in London fare zone 4. It is between Hounslow Central to the west and Osterley to the east. The typical off-peak services are generally as follows:

- 12 tph to Cockfosters or Arnos Grove
- 6 tph to Heathrow Terminal 4
- 6 tph to Heathrow Terminal 5

Eastbound trains towards central London run express between Acton Town and Hammersmith, with trains making an additional stop at Turnham Green in the early mornings and late evenings. Night Tube services operate every 10 minutes between Cockfosters and Heathrow Terminal 5 on Friday and Saturday nights.

Preceding station	London Underground	Following station
Hounslow Central towards Heathrow Airport (Terminal 4 or Terminal 5)	Piccadilly line Heathrow branch	Osterley towards Cockfosters or Arnos Grove
Former services
Preceding station	London Underground	Following station
Hounslow Central towards Hounslow West	District line (1909-32)	Osterley & Spring Grove towards Barking
Hounslow Central towards Hounslow West	District line (1932-34)	Osterley & Spring Grove towards Upminster
Hounslow Central towards Hounslow West	Piccadilly line (1933-34)	Osterley & Spring Grove towards Cockfosters or Arnos Grove
Hounslow Central towards Hounslow West	District line (1934-64)	Osterley towards Upminster, High Street Kensington or Edgware Road

== Connections ==
Several London Buses routes serve the station and nearby bus stops.
