= Northfields tube station =

London Underground station

Northfields
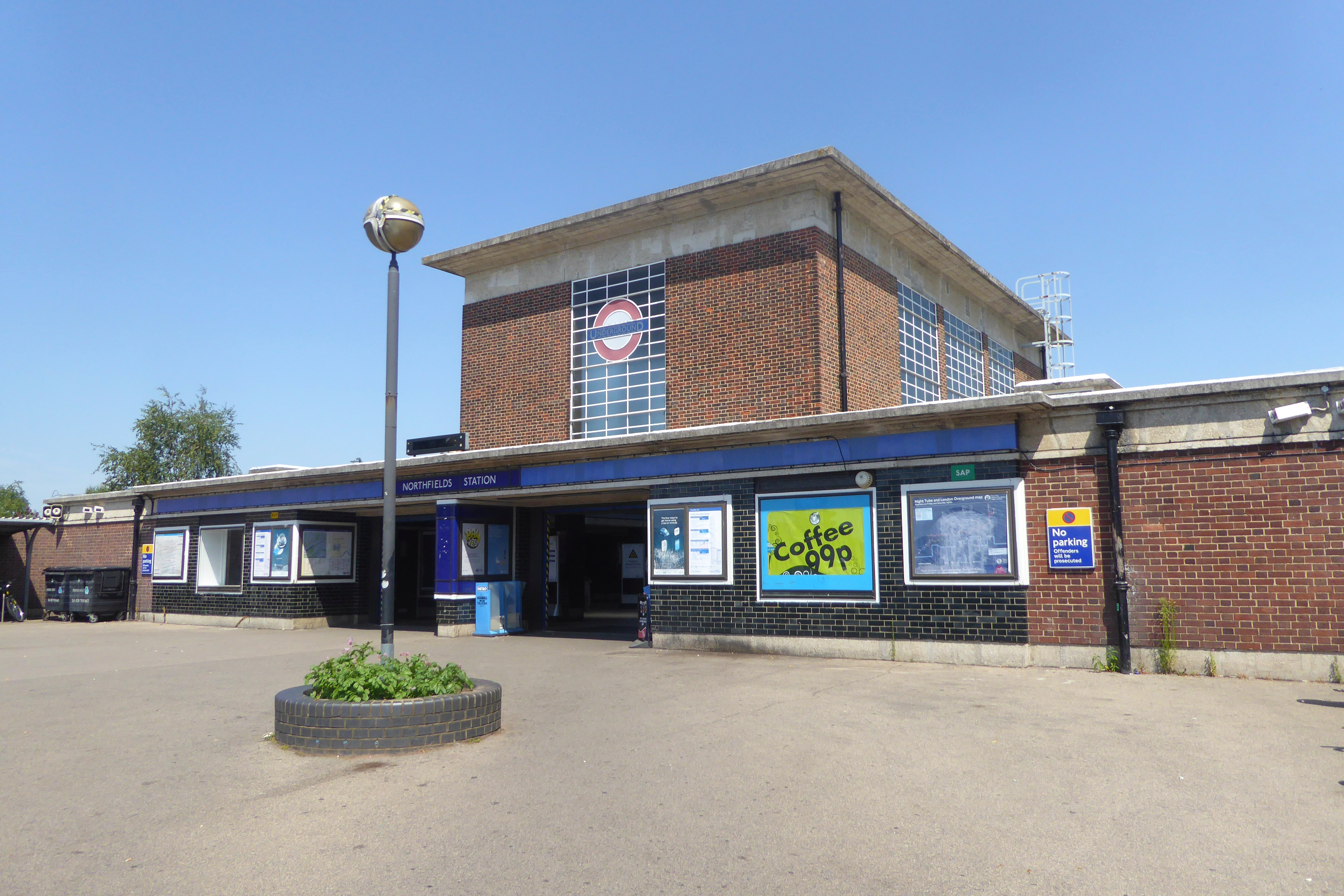
- Station building
- Interactive map of Northfields

General information
- Location: Northfields
- Local authority: London Borough of Ealing
- Managed by: London Underground
- Number of platforms: 4
- Fare zone: 3

London Underground annual entry and exit
- 2020: ▼1.90 million
- 2021: ▼1.63 million
- 2022: ▲2.63 million
- 2023: ▲2.78 million
- 2024: ▼2.58 million

Railway companies
- Original company: District Railway

Key dates
- 16 April 1908: Opened as Northfield (Ealing)
- 11 December 1911: Renamed Northfields & Little Ealing
- 18 December 1932: Station relocated and renamed Northfields
- 9 January 1933: Piccadilly line service introduced
- 9 October 1964: District line service ceased

Listed status
- Listing grade: II
- Entry number: 1263487
- Added to list: 17 May 1994; 32 years ago

Other information
- External links: TfL station info page
- Coordinates: 51.49944°N 0.31417°W

Northfields is a London Underground station in Northfields, in the London Borough of Ealing. It is on the Heathrow branch of the Piccadilly line, between Boston Manor and South Ealing stations. The station is located on Northfield Avenue (B452), and is in London fare zone 3.

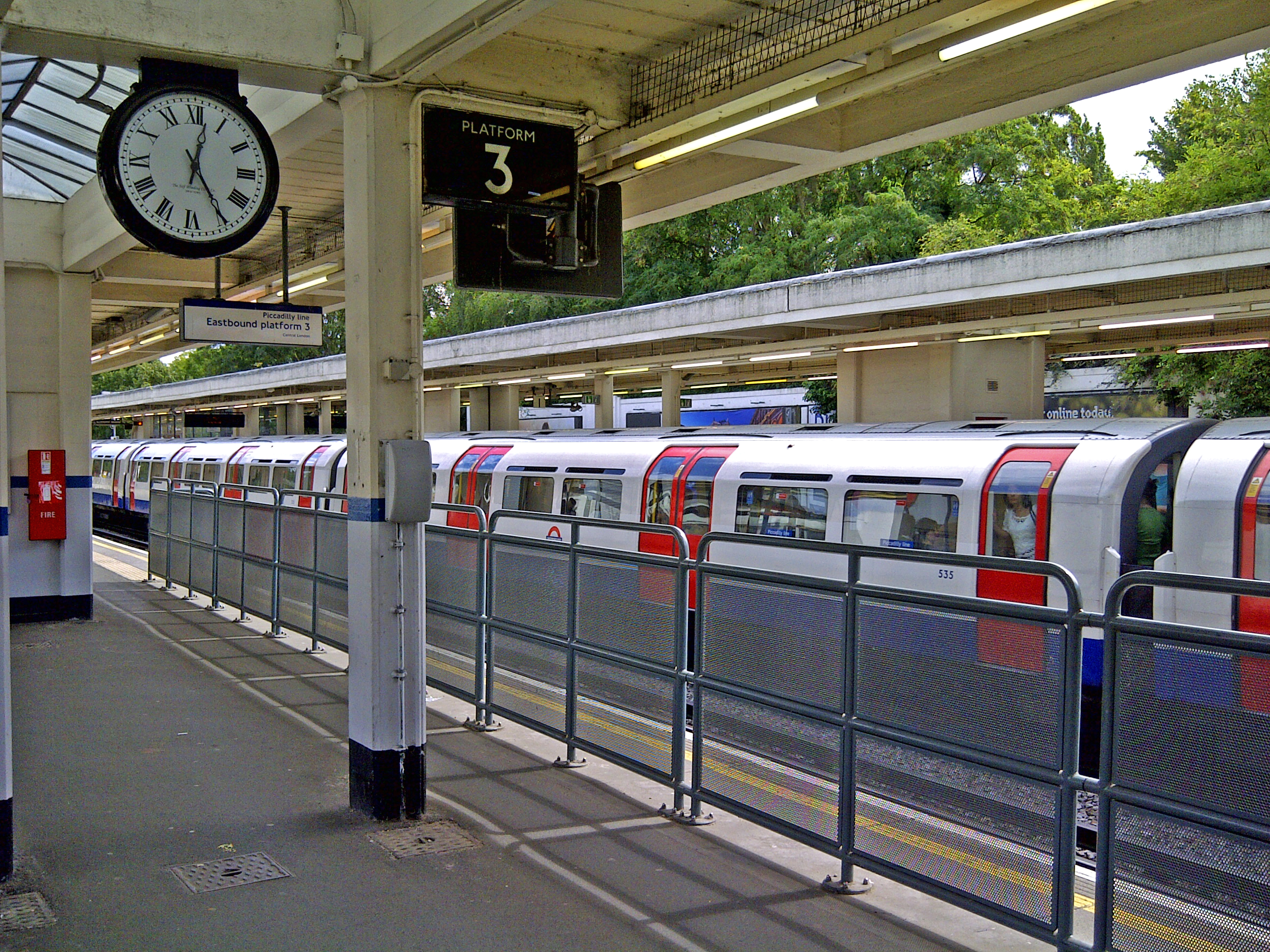
Interior of the Northfields Tube Station

== History ==
The route through Northfields station was opened by the District Railway (DR, now the District line), on 1 May 1883 on a line to Hounslow Town (located on Hounslow High Street but now closed). The station opened as Northfield (Ealing) on 16 April 1908. The station was renamed Northfields and Little Ealing on 11 December 1911.

The station was rebuilt twice. As a halt, the 1908 station was quite basic and provided only rudimentary shelters for passengers. The first rebuilding took place in the 1910s (possibly in conjunction with the 1911 renaming) and the station was given a proper booking hall on the bridge over the tracks and better platform canopies.

In the early 1930s, a new Northfields station was built in conjunction with the preparations for the introduction of Piccadilly line services on the Hounslow branch and the new Northfields depot that would house its trains. Located on the east side of Northfields Avenue, the new station was designed by Charles Holden in a modern European style using brick, reinforced concrete and glass. Like the stations at Sudbury Town, Sudbury Hill, Acton Town and Oakwood that Holden also designed, Northfields station features a tall block-like ticket hall rising above a low horizontal structure that contains station offices and shops. The brick walls of the ticket hall are punctuated with panels of clerestory windows and the structure is capped with a flat concrete slab roof.

The new station opened on 18 December 1932 with the current name. It has two island platforms serving four sets of tracks (two eastbound and two westbound) and is connected directly to the Northfields depot immediately to the west of the station and south of the tracks. Trains may terminate at Northfields station and then run on to the west to enter the depot. To avoid operational conflicts between the eastbound depot exit track and the westbound running track to Boston Manor, the westbound running track passes under the depot track in a cutting. Trains normally enter and exit service at Northfields although there is also a single track connection from the depot to the westbound running track west of Boston Manor.

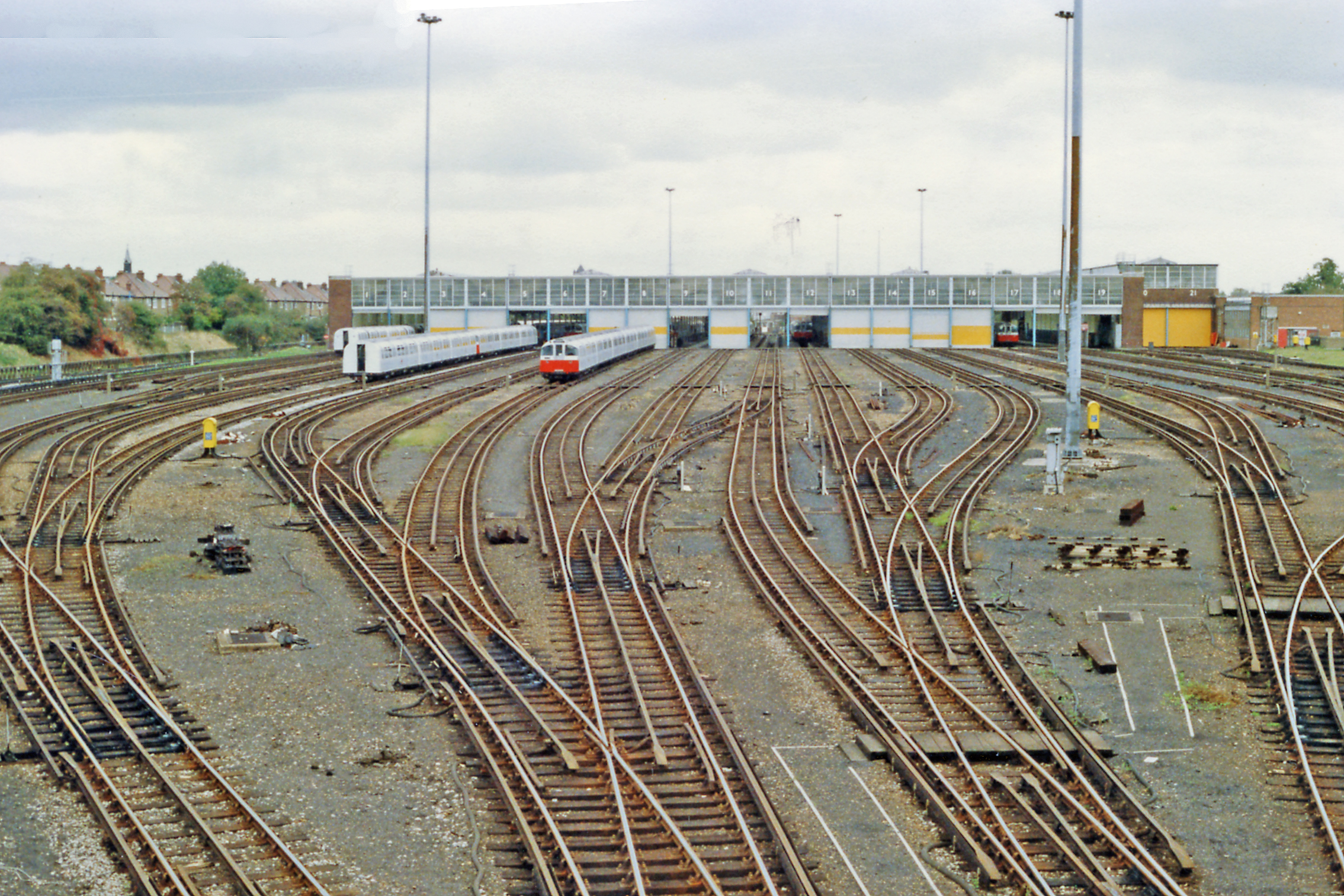
Northfields Depot 1989

Piccadilly line services started running to Northfields from Acton Town on 9 January 1933 and were extended to run to Hounslow West on 13 March 1933. From this date, the branch was operated jointly by both lines until District line services were withdrawn west of Northfields on 9 October 1964 and between Acton Town and Northfields on 10 October 1964.

On 17 May 1994, Northfields station was made a Grade II listed building.

== Connections ==
London Buses routes E2 and E3 and night route N11 serve the station.

Preceding station	London Underground	Following station
Boston Manor towards Heathrow Airport (Terminal 4 or Terminal 5)	Piccadilly line Heathrow branch	South Ealing towards Cockfosters or Arnos Grove
Former services
Preceding station	London Underground	Following station
Boston Manor towards Hounslow Town or Hounslow West	District line (1908–64)	South Ealing towards Upminster
