= Osterley tube station =

London Underground station

Osterley
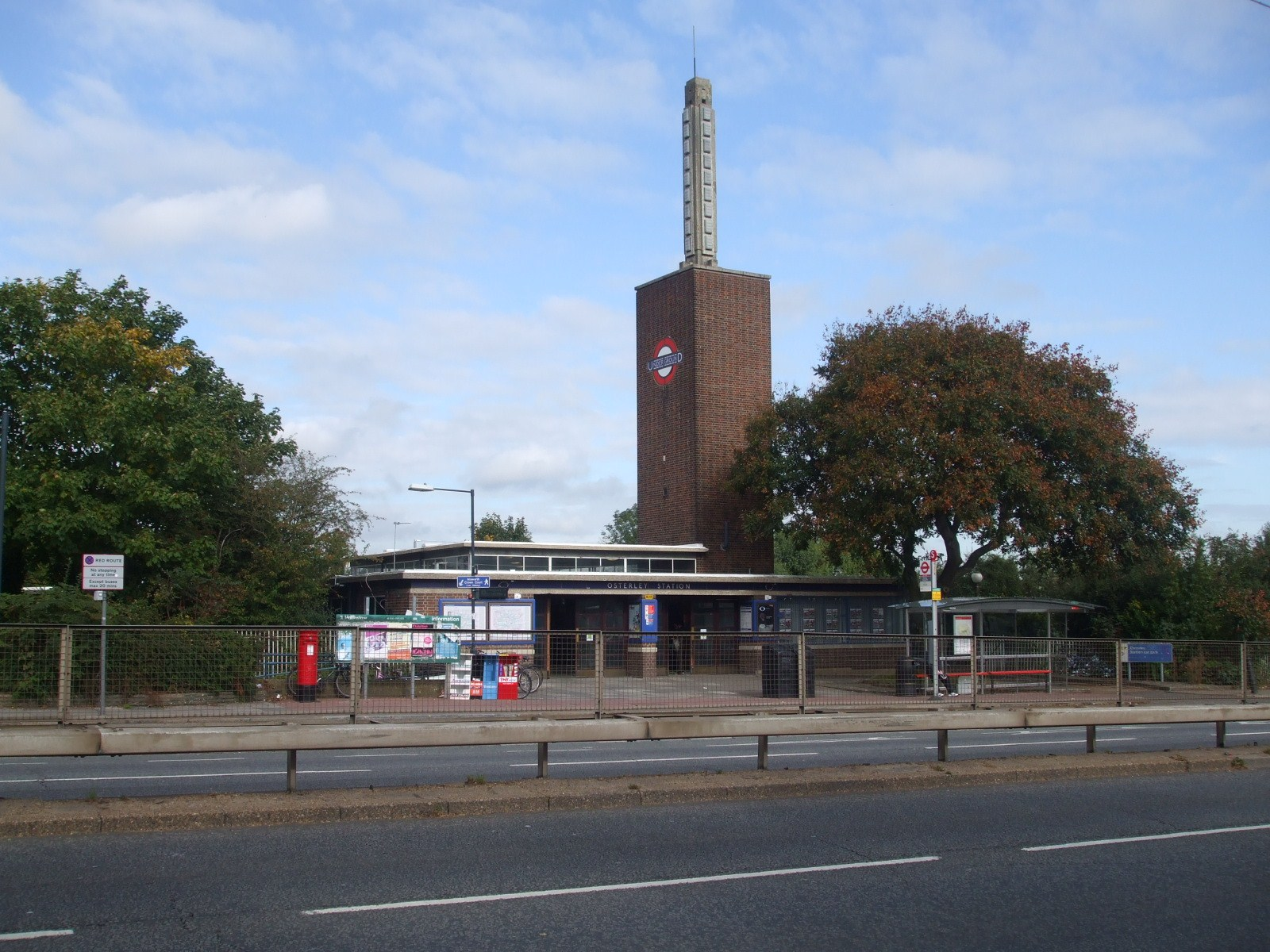
- Station building
- Interactive map of Osterley

General information
- Location: Osterley
- Local authority: London Borough of Hounslow
- Managed by: London Underground
- Number of platforms: 2
- Accessible: Yes
- Fare zone: 4

London Underground annual entry and exit
- 2020: ▼0.96 million
- 2021: ▼0.91 million
- 2022: ▲1.74 million
- 2023: ▼1.68 million
- 2024: ▲1.71 million

Railway companies
- Original company: District Railway

Key dates
- 25 March 1934: Opened
- 9 October 1964: District line service ceased

Listed status
- Listing grade: II
- Entry number: 1240806
- Added to list: 26 May 1987

Other information
- External links: TfL station info page
- Coordinates: 51.48139°N 0.35222°W

Osterley (/ˈɒstərli/ OST-ər-lee) is a London Underground station in Osterley in west London. It is on the Heathrow branch of the Piccadilly line, between Hounslow East and Boston Manor stations. The station is located on Great West Road (A4), close to the National Trust-owned Osterley Park. It is in London fare zone 4.

== History ==
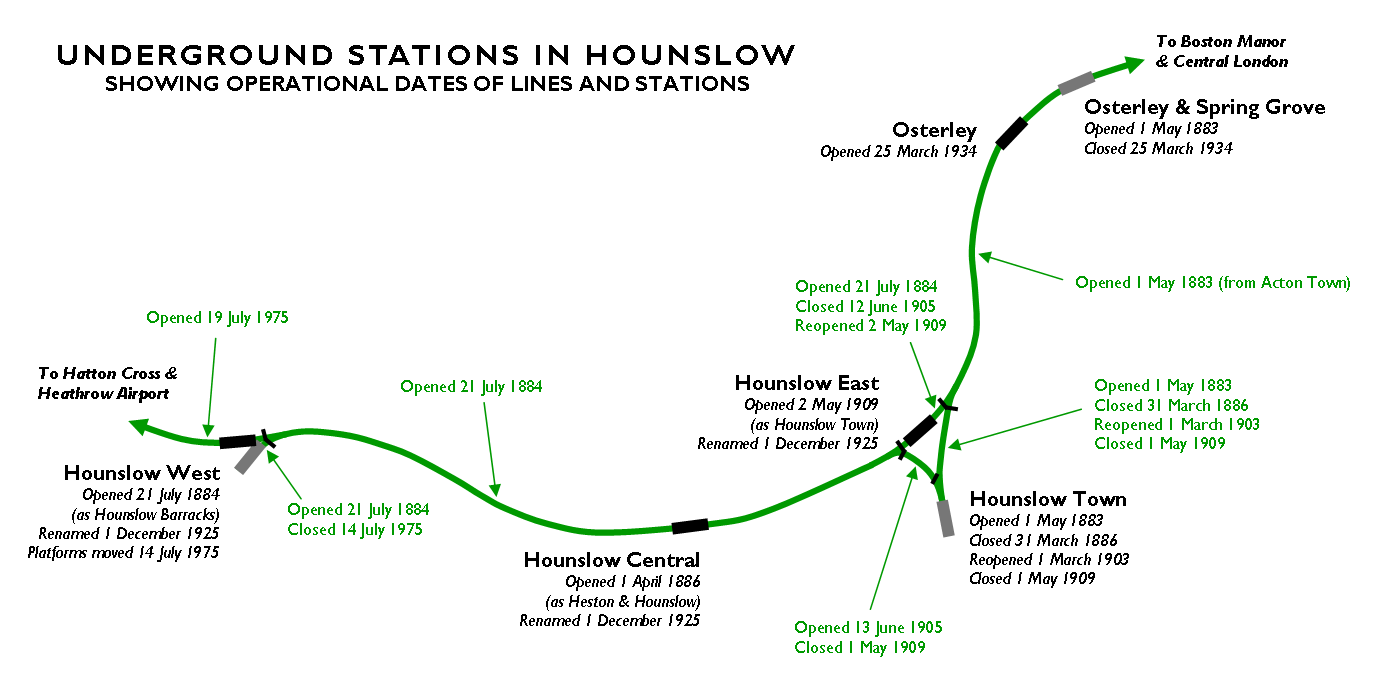
Map showing operational dates for lines and stations in Hounslow

Osterley station opened on 25 March 1934. A station at Osterley had first opened in 1883 at Osterley & Spring Grove, located about 300m to the east on Thornbury Road. In June 1931, it had been decided to relocate the station to the west, to a site adjacent to the new Great West Road which had opened in 1925. Upon opening, the Osterley & Spring Grove station was closed, although the station building remained.

Designed in the modern European style used elsewhere on the Piccadilly line by Charles Holden, the station was designed by architect Stanley Heaps following a preliminary plan by Holden. The design uses brick, reinforced concrete and large areas of glass. The station also features a brick tower topped with a concrete "obelisk", possibly inspired by De Telegraaf Building in Amsterdam, which Holden visited as part of a study trip to the Netherlands. The Chief Executive of London Transport Frank Pick felt that stations designed by others that followed Holden's style lacked attention to detail – with Pick dubbing them 'Holdenesque'. The station was awarded listed building status in 1987, at Grade II. Osterley station was a replacement for an earlier station, "Osterley & Spring Grove", located about 300m to the east on Thornbury Road, which was closed when Osterley opened. The old station buildings and platforms remain.

The station was served from its opening by trains from the District and Piccadilly lines, although District line services were withdrawn on 9 October 1964.

=== Step-free access ===
In 2009, because of financial constraints, Transport for London decided to stop work on a project to provide step-free access at Osterley on the grounds that it was a relatively quiet station and within one or two stops of an existing step-free station, Hounslow East where step-free access has been available since 2005.

In 2017, TfL announced that Osterley station would receive funding for step-free access, with work commencing in 2018. In October 2021, Osterley became the 89th step-free Tube station, following completion of works at the station to install two lifts.

== Connections ==
- London Buses route H91 serves the station.
- Osterley is the closest tube station to Sky's offices near Gillette Corner. Sky runs a private shuttle bus service to and from the station every 15 minutes during extended office hours for visitors and staff.

Preceding station	London Underground	Following station
Hounslow East towards Heathrow Airport (Terminal 4 or Terminal 5)	Piccadilly line Heathrow branch	Boston Manor towards Cockfosters or Arnos Grove
Former services
Preceding station	London Underground	Following station
Hounslow East towards Hounslow West	District line Hounslow West branch (1934–64)	Boston Manor towards Upminster, High Street Kensington or Edgware Road
