= Hounslow Town tube station =

Abandoned London Underground station located in Hounslow, London, England

Hounslow Town
- Interactive map of Hounslow Town

General information
- Location: Hounslow
- Owner: District Railway
- Number of platforms: 2

Key dates
- 1883: Opened
- 1886: Closed
- 1903: Reopened
- 1909: Closed
- Replaced by: Hounslow East

Other information
- Coordinates: 51°28′18″N 0°21′16″W

Hounslow Town was a London Underground station located in Hounslow, west London. It was first opened in 1883 by the District Railway, the precursor to today's District line, on a branch line which is now disused.

The station was situated at the eastern end of Hounslow High Street, at the junction with Kingsley Road. It closed permanently in 1909. Its site is now occupied by Hounslow bus garage.

== History ==
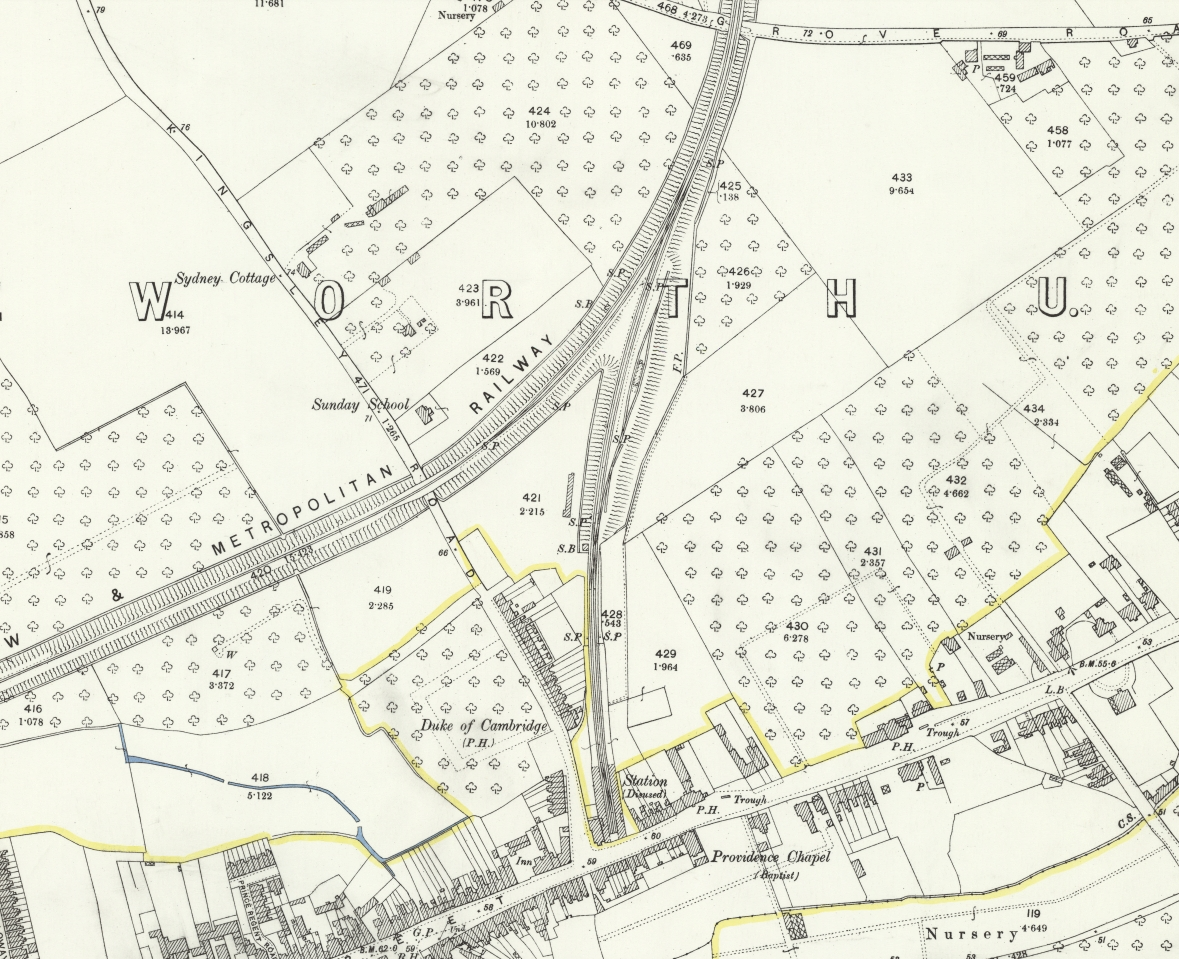
Hounslow Town station on an 1895 Ordnance survey map

Hounslow Town station was opened by the District Railway (DR) on 1 May 1883 as the terminus of a new extension of the DR from Acton Town. The station was constructed with the intention of continuing the line south to join the tracks of the London and South Western Railway (LSWR) close to Hounslow station. To facilitate this, the tracks were built at an elevated level in readiness to cross the high street via a bridge. The LSWR objected to the DR connecting to its tracks, as the new DR route to central London would compete with the LSWR's own route to Waterloo, so the extension was never undertaken.

On 21 July 1884, a branch was constructed from just north of Hounslow Town to Hounslow Barracks station (now called Hounslow West). The branch line was constructed as single track and initially had no intermediate stations between the terminus and Osterley & Spring Grove station (replaced by Osterley station in 1934).

Following its failure to extend south from Hounslow Town and because of the low passenger usage of the Hounslow stations, the DR turned its attention to the new Barracks branch and closed Hounslow Town station on 31 March 1886, A new station, Heston & Hounslow (now Hounslow Central), was opened on the Barracks branch as its replacement on the following day.

On 1 March 1903, Hounslow Town was reopened. Services were divided at Osterley & Spring Grove with two trains per hour running to Hounslow Town and the rest running to Hounslow Barracks. Electrification of the DR's tracks took place between 1903 and 1905 with electric trains replacing steam locomotives on the Hounslow branch from 13 June 1905. When the branch was electrified, the track between Osterley & Spring Grove and Hounslow Central was closed and a new loop was opened from Hounslow Town back to Hounslow Central. Trains would run from Osterley & Spring Grove to Hounslow Town, then reverse and run to Hounslow West.

The new loop was single-tracked and had a sharp radius of 4 chains (80 m) which imposed a speed limit of 8 miles per hour (13 km/h). This method of operation was unsuccessful and short-lived. On 2 May 1909, the closed section of track between Hounslow Central and Osterley & Spring Grove was reopened with a new Hounslow Town station (now named Hounslow East) about 300 metres (980 ft) west of the loop to the old station. The old Hounslow Town station and its two loop tracks were closed permanently.

Following the closure, the station was demolished to be replaced by a bus garage for the London General Omnibus Company that opened on 14 July 1912. The current bus station and garage occupy the same site. A plaque in front of the bus garage gives a brief history of the old Underground station.

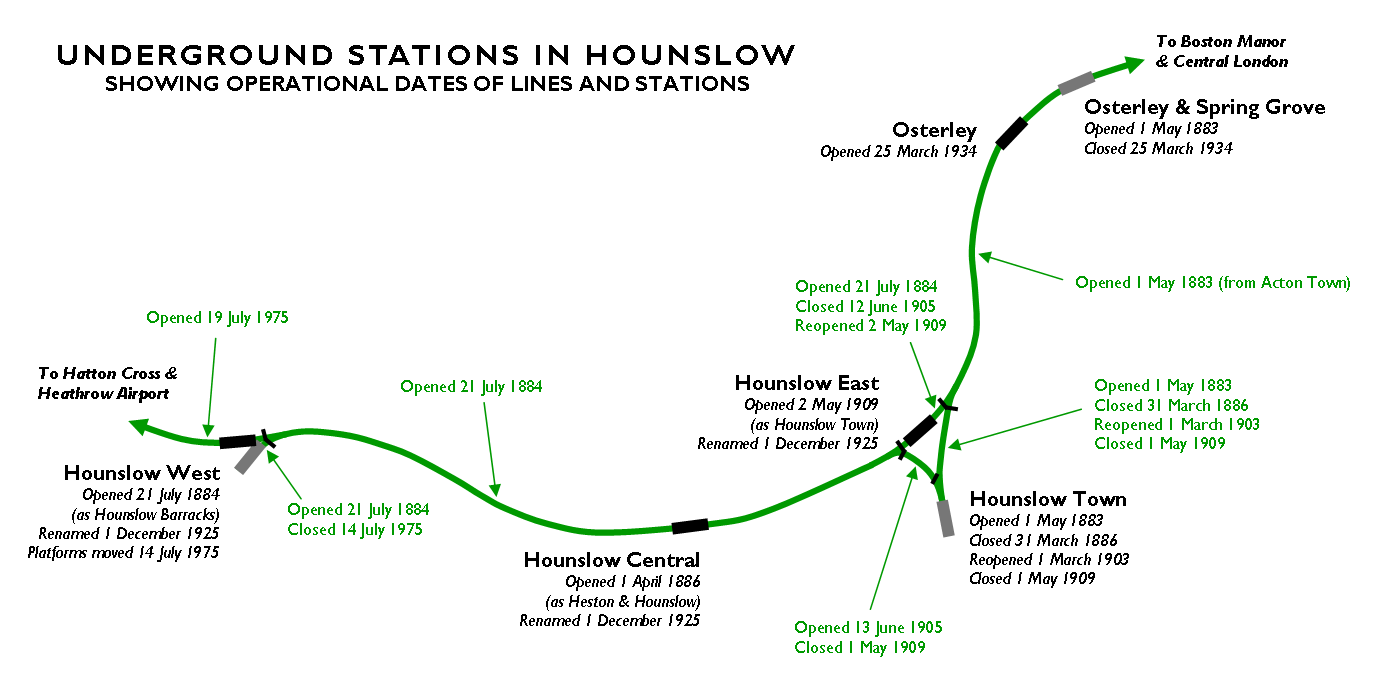
Diagram showing operational dates for lines and stations around Hounslow

Former services
Preceding station	London Underground	Following station
Terminus	District line Hounslow Town branch (1883-84)	Osterley & Spring Grove towards Mansion House
Terminus	District line Hounslow Town branch (1884-86)	Osterley & Spring Grove towards Whitechapel
Terminus	District line Hounslow Town branch (1903-05)	Osterley & Spring Grove towards Upminster
Heston & Hounslow towards Hounslow Barracks	District line Hounslow West branch (1905)	Osterley & Spring Grove towards Upminster
Heston & Hounslow towards Hounslow Barracks	District line Hounslow West branch (1905-08)	Osterley & Spring Grove towards East Ham
Heston & Hounslow towards Hounslow Barracks	District line Hounslow West branch (1908-09)	Osterley & Spring Grove towards Barking
