= Boston Manor Park =

Park in Hounslow, London

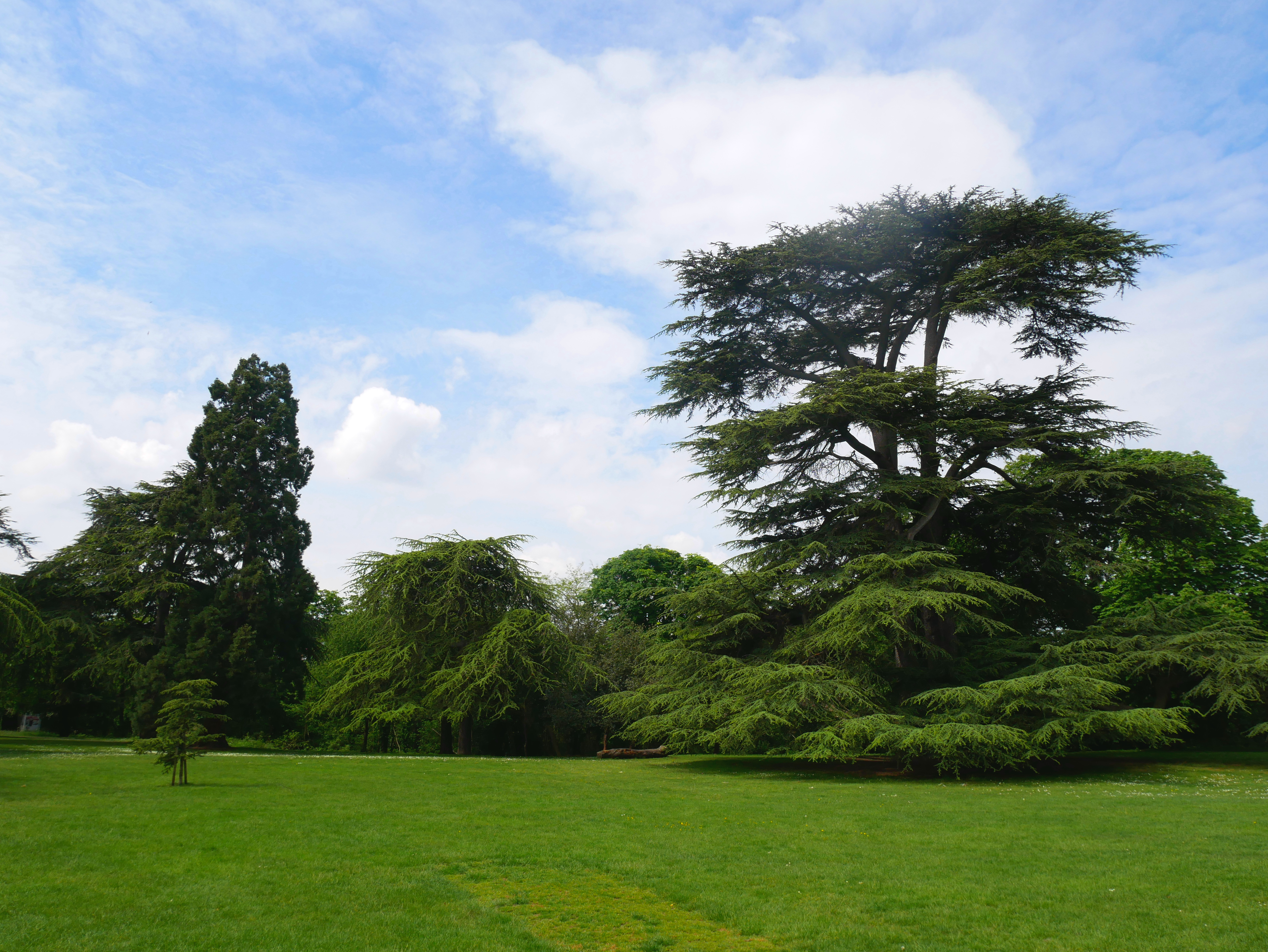
- Trees in Boston Manor Park to the southeast of the Manor House
- Interactive map of Boston Manor Park
- Type: public park
- Location: London, England
- Coordinates: 51°29′28″N 0°19′12″W
- Area: 11.36 hectares (28 acres)
- Created: 1924
- Operator: London Borough of Hounslow
- Open: 8am-dusk
- Status: Open year round
- Website: hounslow.gov.uk

Boston Manor Park is a large public park in the London Borough of Hounslow. A combination of woodland and open space, with an area adjoining the Grand Union Canal, it was created in 1924 from part of the historic estate of the 17th-century stately home Boston Manor House.

== History of the park ==
The Boston Manor estate is thought to date back to at least 1163 and had a series of influential owners. At one time, it was part of the estate of royal financier Thomas Gresham, who also owned neighbouring Osterley Park. The house that survives in the centre of the park dates from 1623. Just under a century later, the grounds were described as comprising: "gardens, walls, walks, courts, 5 fish ponds . . . Plantation and nursery computed to be 3 acres . . . Whole being well wooded and watered." In 1670, the estate was sold for just over £5,000 to the Clitherow family, and it remained in their ownership for the succeeding 250 years.

In the late 18th century, some land was sold to enable construction of the Grand Junction Canal (later to become a section of the Grand Union Canal), with Clitherow Lock – then the second lock from the Thames – being built on the estate. By the late 19th century, this part of London had become urbanised and increasingly shabby, but the estate remained a rural island – containing fine views, historic trees, roses and kitchen garden.

=== Estate dispersal and park opening ===
In 1918, Colonel Stacey Clitherow had decided to sell the Boston Manor estate. Estate agent's particulars described a property containing glasshouses for growing melons and cucumbers, grapevines, and a 200-yard herbaceous border. The house did not reach its reserve price so, in 1923, Colonel Clitherow sold the manor and fifty acres to Brentford Urban District Council. Some land was developed as housing and the park was opened to the public on 11 September 1924.

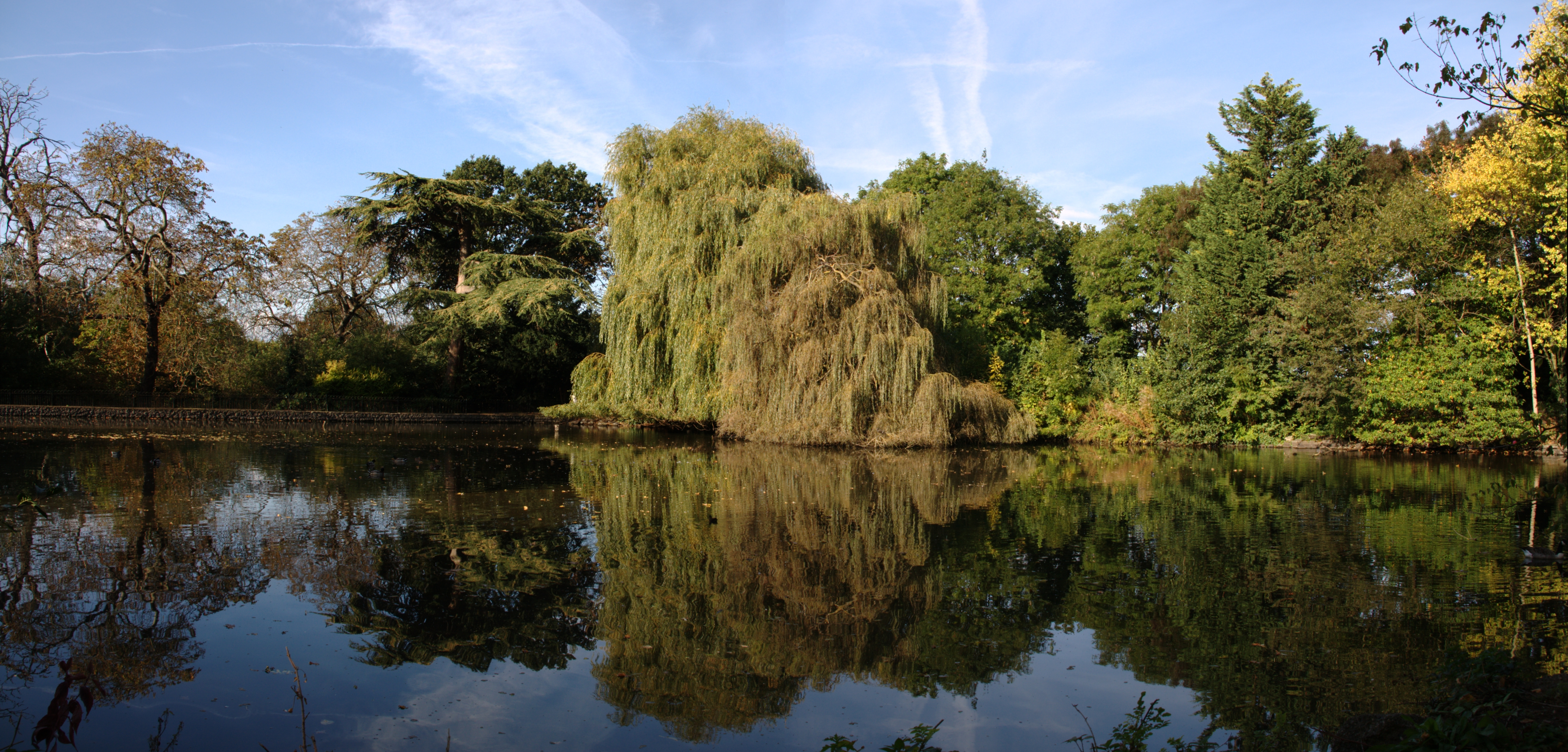
An ornamental lake with island, dating from the era when this was a grand estate, stands close to Boston Manor House

== Park layout ==
Comprising an area of 11.36 hectares (28 acres) surrounding the manor house, the park is accessed from Boston Manor Road on the eastern perimeter. The construction of the M4 motorway in 1964-5 was the biggest alteration to the park landscape, dissecting the park from north-west to south-east perimeters. The Grand Union Canal and River Brent run along the western perimeter, the canal taking in what is now known as Clitheroes or Clitheroe's Lock 99.

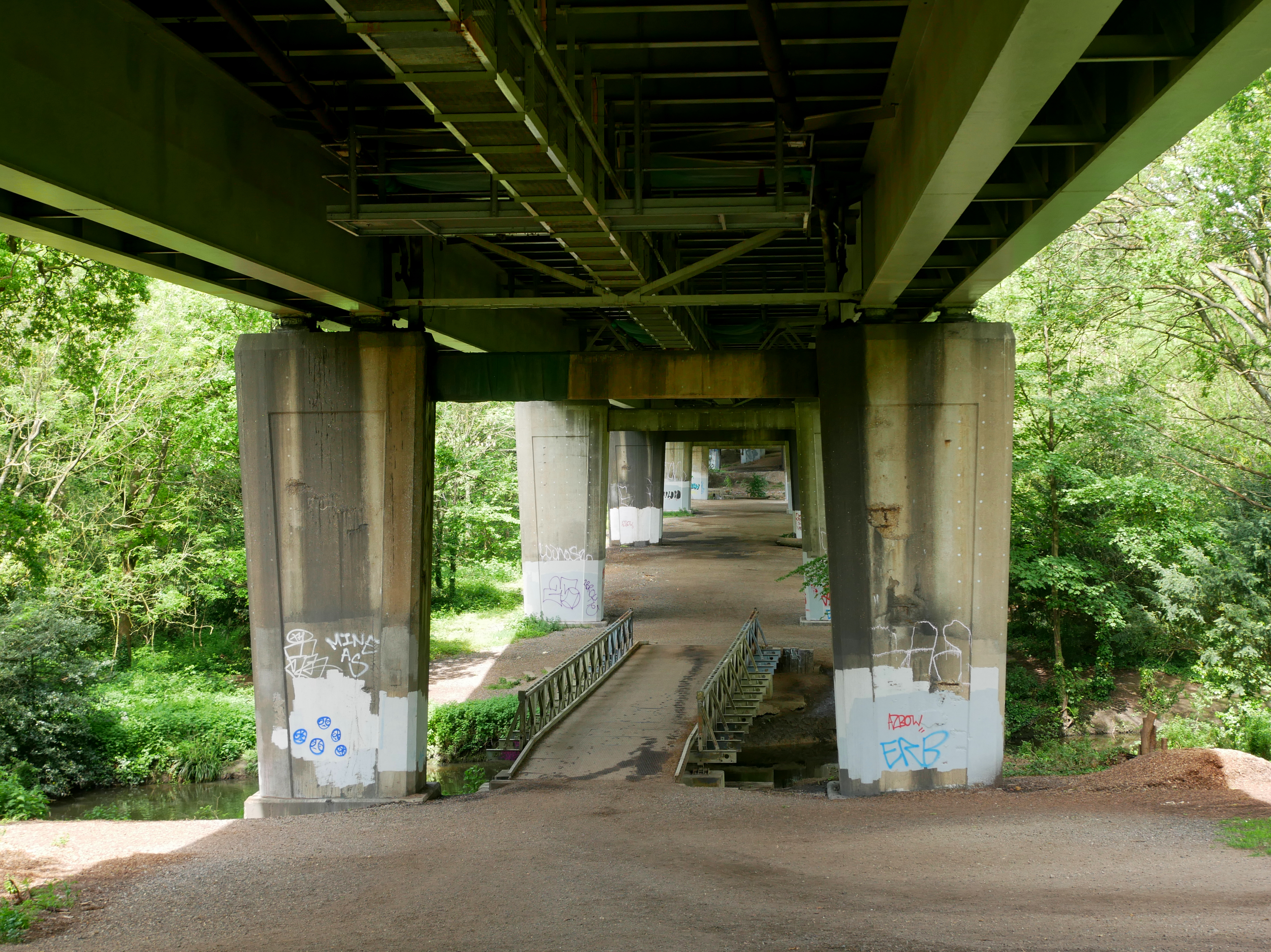
The M4 cuts through the park

=== Features of interest ===
The canalside is a designated Nature Conservation Area. Notable trees include fine old cedars, some of which may date back to 18th-century plantings by the Clitherow family. A large ornamental pond is to the north of the manor house and part of the original garden wall remains. Thames Rivers Trust has undertaken work at the stepped weir at the park to assist the migration of elver, installing an 'elver pass' in 2012.

=== Recent developments ===
Recent works to the park include the creation of a wildflower meadow in 2006 and the restoration of the walled garden. General upgrades have included replanting of shrubs, trees and herbaceous borders. The park first won a Green Flag Award in 2005.

== Activities in the park ==
The park is under the overall management of London Borough of Hounslow and includes three tennis courts, a basketball court and children's play area. The manor house is open for tours and special events. The Brentford Festival was an annual event held in the park between 2005 and 2012, before moving to Blondin Park.
