= Brentford and Chiswick =

Brentford and Chiswick may refer to the following, in England:

- Municipal Borough of Brentford and Chiswick
- Brentford and Chiswick (UK Parliament constituency)

== See also ==
- Brentford
- Chiswick
