= The Forester, Ealing =

Listed pub in Northfields, London, England

The Forester
- The pub in 2025

- Location within London Borough of Ealing Location within Greater London

General information
- Architectural style: Domestic Revival
- Location: 2 Leighton Road, Northfields, Ealing, London, England
- Coordinates: 51°30′22″N 0°19′14″W
- Completed: 1909; 117 years ago
- Renovated: 2024 (refurbished)
- Client: Royal Brewery
- Owner: Fuller, Smith & Turner

Design and construction
- Architect: Nowell Parr
- Designations

Listed Building – Grade II
- Official name: The Forester public house
- Designated: 19 June 1990
- Reference no.: 1263519

Website
- foresterealing.co.uk

The Forester is a Grade II listed public house on Leighton Road in Northfields, an area in Ealing, London, England. Built in 1909 to designs by Nowell Parr for the Royal Brewery, it is regarded as one of Parr's most significant pub designs. It retains a largely intact historic interior and is included on the Campaign for Real Ale (CAMRA)'s National Inventory of Historic Pub Interiors, where it is awarded a three-star rating denoting an interior of "outstanding national historic importance".

== History ==
The Forester was built in 1909 by the architect Nowell Parr for Royal Brewery. It is considered one of Parr's most significant public house designs, reflecting the transition from the ornate, compartmentalised pubs of the late Victorian era to the more restrained neo-Georgian and Tudor-style pubs of the inter-war period.

On 19 June 1990, The Forester was designated a Grade II listed building. It was included on the Campaign for Real Ale (CAMRA)'s National Inventory of Historic Pub Interiors before the inventory's grading system was revised. Under the revised scheme, it is rated three stars and its interior is regarded as being "of outstanding national historic importance".

The pub was acquired by Fuller, Smith & Turner in 2012 and was operated under tenancy by MC Bars until June 2023, when it became a managed house. It underwent redecoration and refurbishment in early 2024. The rear room is occupied by an independently operated Thai restaurant.

== Architecture ==
=== Exterior ===
The building has rendered brick walls above a granite base, with a tiled roof and prominent brick chimney stacks. Designed in a Domestic Revival style, it has two storeys and fronts both Leighton Road and Seaford Road with three bays on each elevation. At street level, the frontage runs continuously around the corner and is divided by piers faced with green tiles. Decorative iron railings sit above a moulded cornice and plain fascia. Original partially glazed entrances survive, including a rounded corner porch supported by simple classical columns, matching porches on Leighton Road, and a central entrance on Seaford Road marked by a decorative hood. The windows retain their original timber frames and stained glass details.

On the upper floor, sash windows are set beneath shaped brick heads and are accompanied by timber shutters. Two bays on the Leighton Road frontage project forward as bow windows, above which are gabled features with decorative detailing that continue around the Seaford Road side. The return elevation includes a conservatory in front of a projecting bay, with French doors and matching windows incorporating small-pane glazing and stained glass.

=== Interior ===
The interior survives largely intact and retains its original pub layout, with a public bar alongside a larger saloon bar, which connects to a dining area at the rear. Much of the historic multi-room arrangement also survives, with four public rooms remaining in use around a central servery. Features include exposed ceiling beams, timber panelling to the lower walls, period fireplaces, and a substantial mahogany bar with matching fittings and mirrored back sections. The original bar counter and back fittings survive, incorporating distinctive arched detailing, while an office for the publican remains within the servery.

Decorative stained-glass panels survive in the windows, and remnants of former gas-lighting fittings can still be seen in the public bar. Decorative doorways and screens separate the principal spaces, while the saloon retains timber partitions around the bar. The former saloon also retains rare bell-pushes used to summon waiter service, believed to be unique among London's historic pubs. In the public bar, fixed seating lines the walls and is divided by turned wooden balusters. Openings within the bar counter associated with the former servicing of beer engines also survive.

== See also ==
- List of pubs in London
