= Nowell Parr =

British architect (1864–1933)

Nowell Parr FRIBA
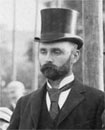
- Nowell Parr, 1895
- Born: Thomas Henry Nowell Parr; 1864; Handsworth, Staffordshire, England
- Died: 23 September 1933 (aged 69); Kingston, Surrey, England
- Occupation: Architect
- Known for: Public houses in west London, especially for Fuller's Brewery

Thomas Henry Nowell Parr FRIBA (1864 – 23 September 1933) was a British architect, best known for designing pubs in west London. Many of these were built while Parr was "house architect" for Fuller's Brewery. Parr designed various buildings in Brentford while he was surveyor and then architect to the Council from 1894 to 1907.

== Early life ==
Parr was born in Handsworth, Staffordshire (now Birmingham), the eldest child of Thomas Parr and Frances "Fanny" Nowell. He was baptised on 20 July 1864. In 1890, his career began as an architectural assistant for Walsall Corporation architects' department, for which he worked until 1894.

== Career ==
=== Brentford Council ===
In 1894, the Brentford Local Board employed Nowell Parr as "Surveyor to the Council", and from 1897 as an architect.

From 1896–1905, Parr was architect for five large buildings in Brentford, of which three survive: Brentford Baths, Brentford Fire Station (1897), and Brentford Library. Brentford Vestry Hall (apparently the finest of these five) was demolished in 1963, and Brentford Enclosed Market in 1982. The Market eventually became a skateboarding rink, and was also used as a backdrop for episodes of The Sweeney, the 1970s British television police drama.

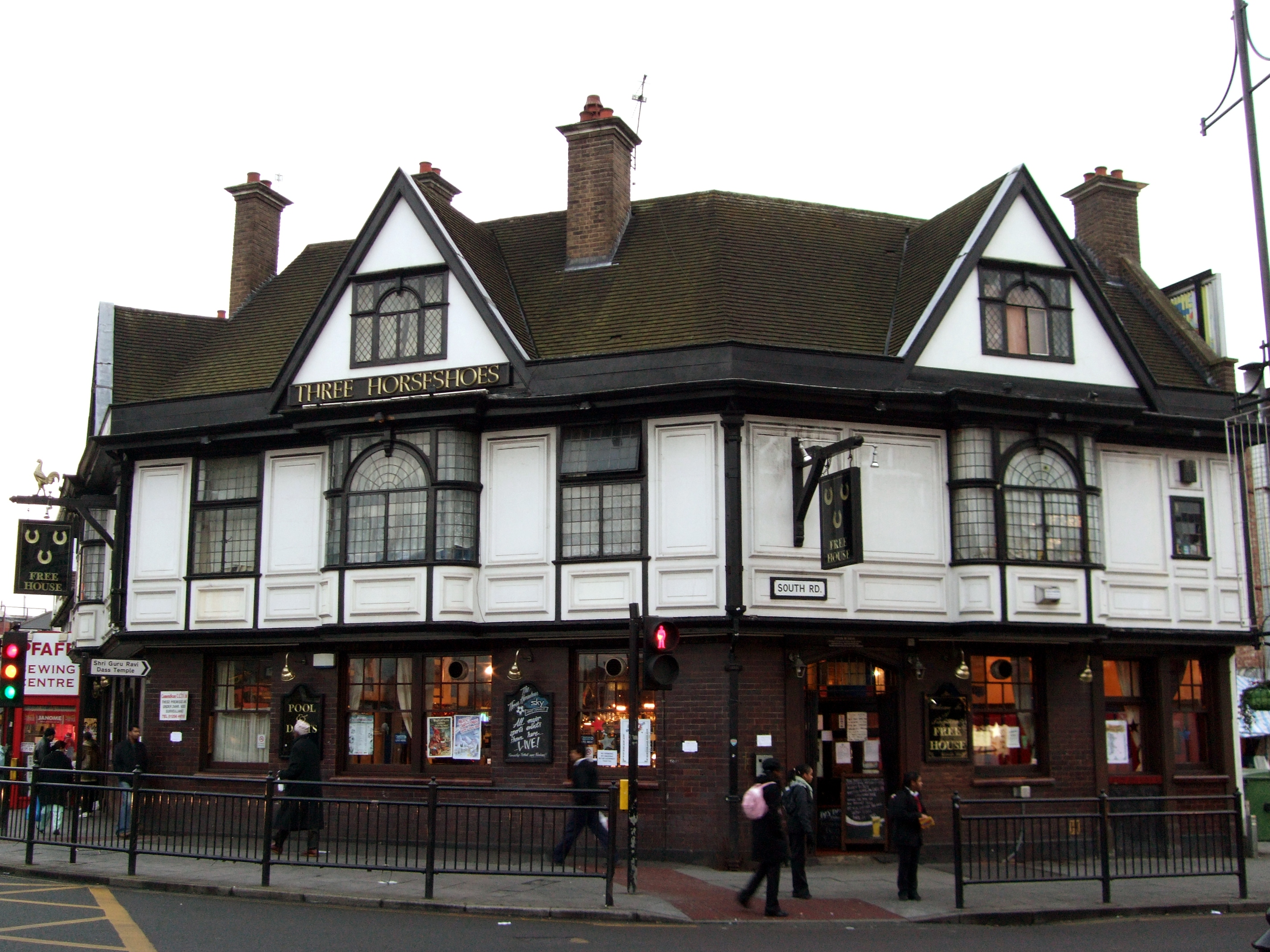
Three Horseshoes, Southall

=== Private practice ===
While still working for Brentford Council, Parr began undertaking work as a pub architect. He worked for both Fuller's Brewery, Chiswick and the Royal Brewery, Brentford.

Parr started to work independently in about 1900, while still employed by Brentford UDC. He later went into partnership with fellow architect A. E. Kates, and was also joined by his son, John Nowell Parr (died 1975). He was made a Fellow of the Royal Institute of British Architects (FRIBA) in 1925.

Parr is notable for his frequent use of Royal Doulton glazed tiles for his pub facades, often in bright or unusual colours, such as green and a mottled slate blue at the Beehive (which has a beehive-shaped turret on top) in Brentford in 1907.

== Personal life ==
In 1891, Parr married Betsey Fennell in Birmingham. They had three children: Marguerite Parr (1894–1978), John Nowell Parr (1897–1975) and Eunice Parr (1905-1940) John was also an architect.

In 1922, he married Mabel Harbird. They had two children: Nowell (Tim) Parr (1925-1978) and Stanley Parr (1929-2017)

Parr lived at 42 Cranley Gardens, South Kensington, London and 52 Kew Bridge Road, Brentford. He died on 23 September 1933.

== Notable buildings ==
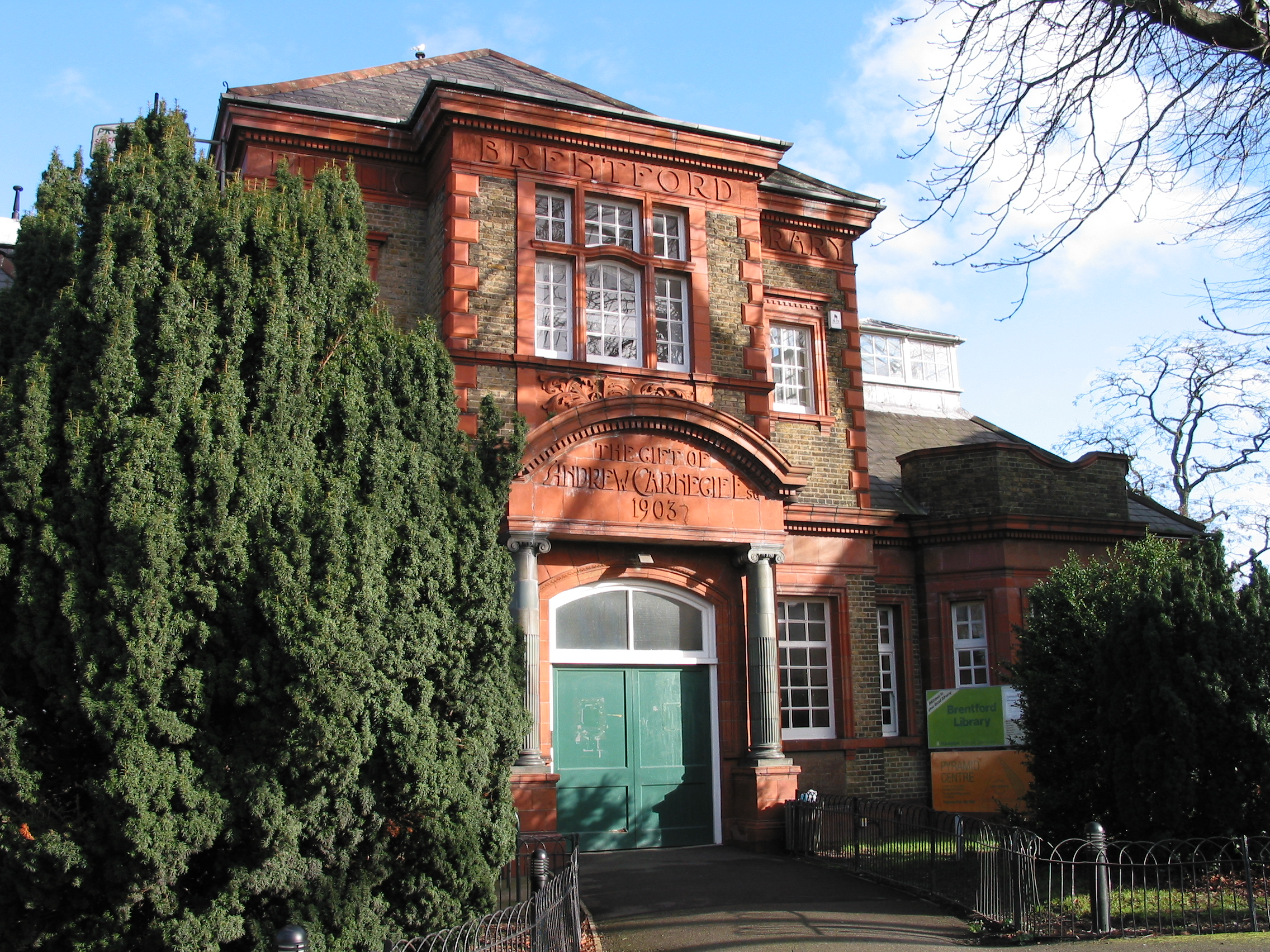
Brentford Public Library

- The Angel public house, 697 Uxbridge Road, Hayes, Middlesex; Grade II listed (1926)
- The Beehive, public house, 227 High Street, Brentford (1907)
- Boatmen's Institute, The Butts, Brentford; Grade II listed (1904)
- Brentford Baths, Clifden Road, Brentford; Grade II listed (1895–96)
- Brentford Fire Station, Brentford (1897) [now offices]
- Brentford Public Library, Brentford; Grade II listed (1904)
- The Cheshire Cheese, Westminster; Grade II listed (1928)
- Devonshire House (formerly the Manor Tavern), public house, Chiswick, London
- The Duke of Kent, Scotch Common, Ealing; Grade II listed (1929)
- The Duke of York, public house, 107 Devonshire Road, Chiswick, London
- The Forester, public house, Northfields, Ealing, Grade II listed (1909)
- The George, public house, 28 Hammersmith Broadway, Hammersmith, Grade II listed (1911)
- The Hole in the Wall, public house, Chiswick, London
- The Old Pack Horse, public house at Chiswick High Road, Chiswick, London; Grade II listed (1905)
- Pottery Arms, public house, Claypond Lane, Brentford (1922)
- The Three Horseshoes, public house, Southall, Middlesex
- Waterman's Arms, 1 Ferry Lane, Brentford

== Legacy ==
There is a block of flats named Nowell Parr Court at Boston Manor Road, Brentford, Middlesex.
