= Brentford Library =

Public library in Brentford, London, England

Coordinates: 51.48658°N 0.30755°W

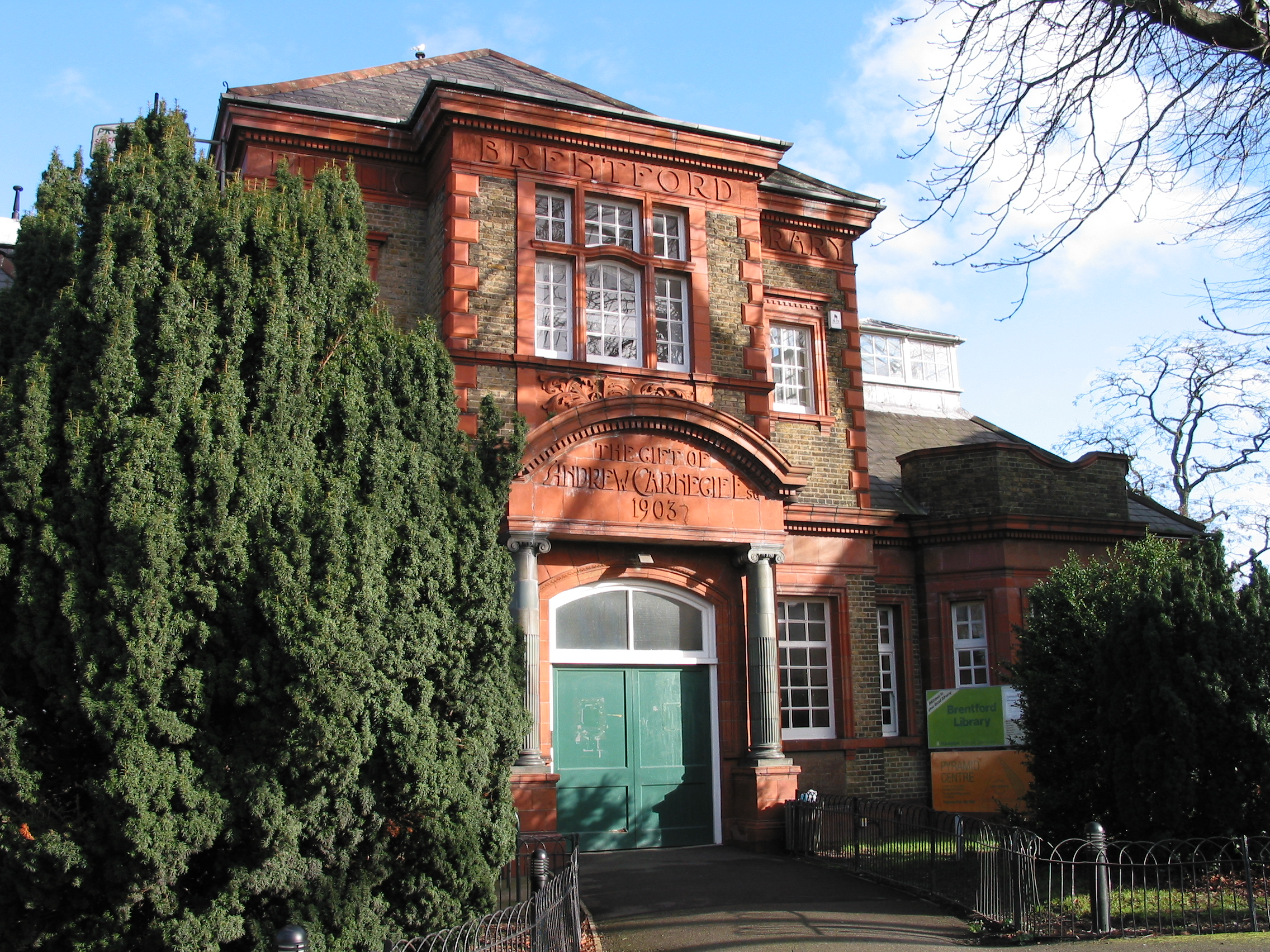
Brentford Library

Brentford Library is a Grade II listed building at Boston Manor Road, Brentford, London.

It was built in 1903 by Joseph Dorey and Co; for the then Brentford District Council. The benefactor was Andrew Carnegie and the architect was Nowell Parr. The foundation stone was laid by the Countess of Jersey, who lived not far away at Osterley Park.

The building is constructed from yellow stock brick laid in English bond and dressed with terracotta. The roof uses Welsh slate. It was designated a listed building on 2 October 1990.

On the floor of the entrance hall is a mosaic displaying the coat of arms of Middlesex (in the original form, identical to that of Essex, without the Saxon crown). Also in the entrance hall, on the staircase leading up, is a marble memorial by Nowell Parr dedicated to the local men who died in the Second Boer War.

It closed in November 2016 due to plaster falling from the roof in the children's area. Structural engineering surveys show that all three ceilings need repair, and as of end December 2016, Hounslow Council hope to re-open it "very early in the New Year". It partially reopened in January 2017, and in full in April.

== Brentford war memorials ==
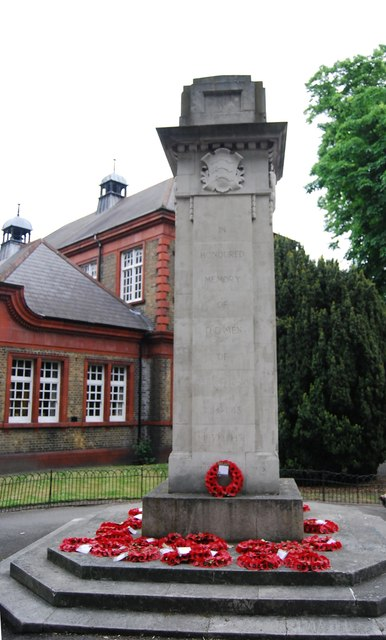
Brentford War Memorial, outside the Library

Just outside the library are situated several memorials dedicated to the men of Brentford who lost their lives in the First World War and the Second World War. The main memorial, unveiled in 1923, is in the form of a stone pillar. On one side is an inscription which reads:

In honoured memory of the men of Brentford / 1914–1918 / 1939–1945.

On the other sides are the names of Brentford's First World War dead. Next to the main memorial are three smaller memorials. The middle one originally stood outside the now largely neglected St Lawrence's Church in Brentford High Street near the bridge over the Grand Union Canal. Repaired and restored, it has stood outside the Library since 19 September 2009. The other two are dedicated to the employees of the Gas Light and Coke Company, and they were moved to Brentford after the company's works in Fulham closed in 1949. The names are on metal plaques and there are separate ones for each of the World Wars. The names of Brentford's Second World War dead are on another metal plaque next to those of the Gas Light and Coke Company who lost their lives in that war, while another metal plaque displaying the First World War dead of an unidentified company is situated next to the First World War plaque of the Gas Light and Coke Company.
