= Duke of Kent, Ealing =

Pub in Ealing, London

Duke of Kent
- Duke of Kent

- Location within London Borough of Ealing Location within Greater London
- Former names: Kent Hotel

General information
- Location: 2 Scotch Common, Ealing, London, England
- Coordinates: 51°31′31″N 0°19′13″W
- Opened: 1929

Design and construction
- Developer: Nowell Parr
- Designations

Listed Building – Grade II
- Official name: The Kent Hotel
- Designated: 23 December 1998
- Reference no.: 1246021

The Duke of Kent is a Grade II listed public house at 2 Scotch Common, Ealing, London.

It was built in 1929 by Nowell Parr as the "Kent Hotel" and is owned by Fuller's Brewery.
