= Chiswick Urban District =

Former local government area in the UK

Coordinates: 51.4911°N 0.2654°W

Chiswick
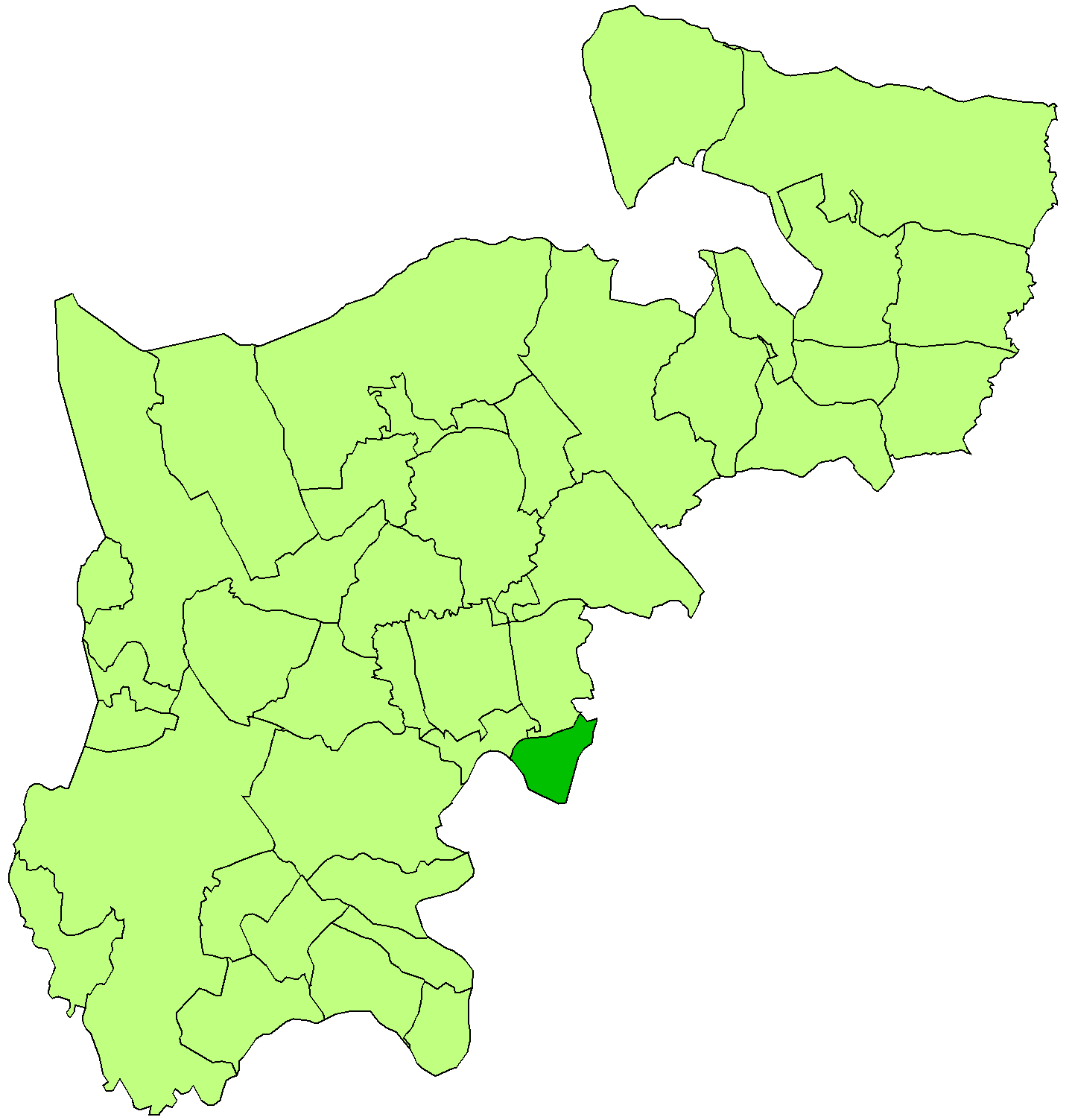
- Chiswick within Middlesex in 1911
- Area
  - 1901: 1,249 acres (5.1 km^{2})
  - 1921: 1,250 acres (5.1 km^{2})
- Population
  - 1901: 29,809
  - 1921: 40,938
- History
  - Created: 1858
  - Abolished: 1927
  - Succeeded by: Brentford and Chiswick Urban District
- Status: Improvement commissioners (1858 - 1883); Local board (1883 - 1894); Urban district (from 1894)
- Government: Chiswick Urban District Council (from 1894)
  - HQ: Turnham Green

Chiswick was a local government district in the county of Middlesex, England, from 1858 to 1927. It was part of the London postal district and the Metropolitan Police District.

The Chiswick Improvement Act 1858 created a board of 19 commissioners, one of whom was nominated by the Duke of Devonshire, the major landowner of the parish. The commissioners had power to levy rates for such matters as lighting, paving and sewerage.

In 1883 the commissioners were replaced by a local board (which was also an urban sanitary authority) created under the Public Health Act 1875. the Duke of Devonshire retained the right to nominate a member of the board so long as he continued to hold 500 acres (2.0 km^{2}) in the parish.

The Local Government Act 1894 reconstituted the local board's area as an urban district, and the eighteen-member Chiswick Urban District Council replaced the local board. The urban district was initially divided into two wards each electing nine councillors named Chiswick and Turnham Green. In 1901 these were replaced with six wards, returning three councillors each: Bedford Park, Chiswick Park, Grove Park, Gunnersbury, Old Chiswick, and Turnham Green.

In 1927 Chiswick UD was amalgamated with the neighbouring Brentford Urban District to form Brentford and Chiswick Urban District.
