= Brentford Baths =

Building in Brentford, London, England

Coordinates: 51.4868°N 0.3068°W

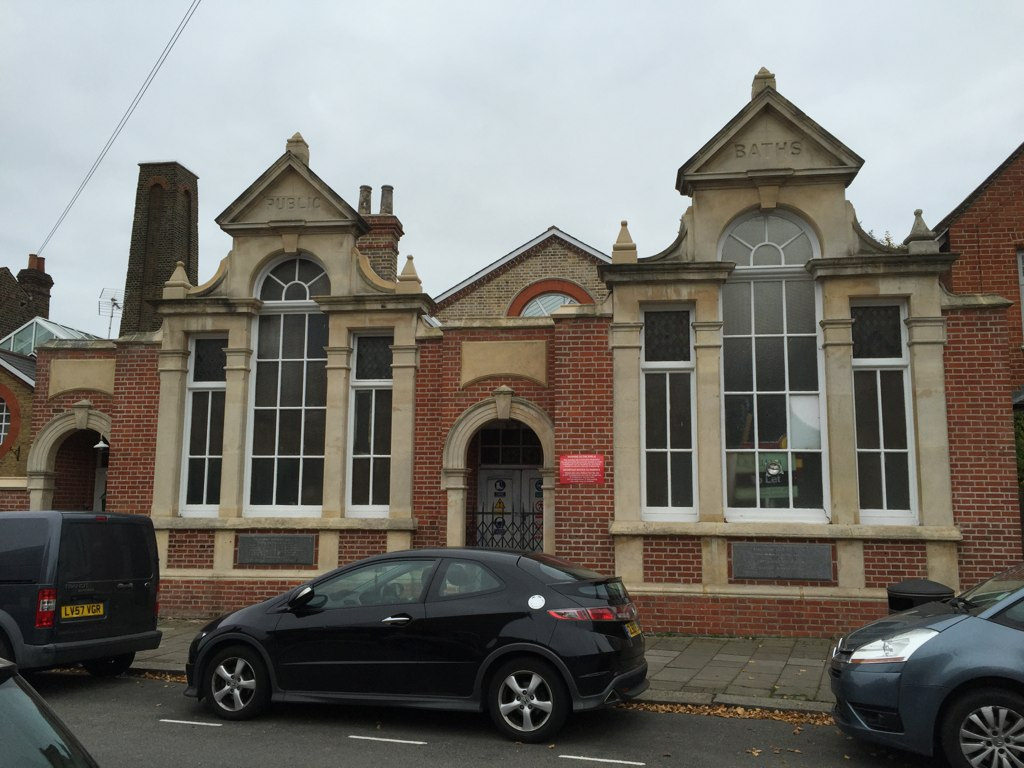
Brentford Baths in 2015

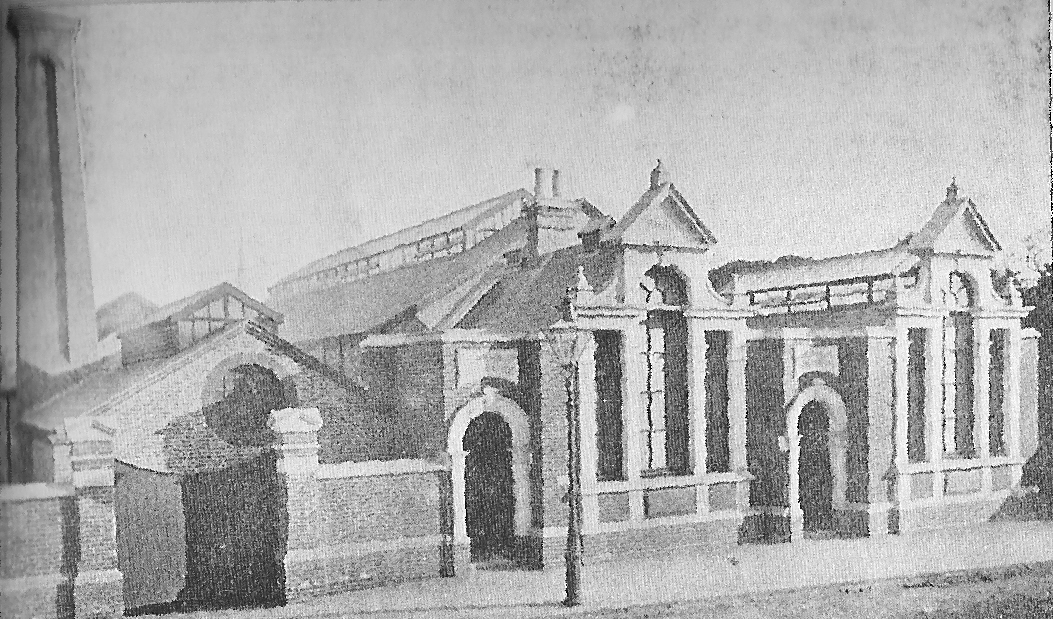
Brentford Baths in 1896

Brentford Baths is a Grade II listed building at Clifden Road, Brentford, in the London Borough of Hounslow.

It was built in 1895–96, and the architect was Nowell Parr. The Baths closed in 1990 and later became a residential building.

== In popular culture ==
- The interior scenes for the Cyberdelia nightclub in the 1995 movie, Hackers were filmed in the pool.
