= Hugh Ronalds =

English horticulturalist (1760–1833)

- Born: 4 March 1760; Brentford, England
- Died: 18 November 1833 (aged 73); Brentford
- Known for: Apple cultivars
- Scientific career
- Fields: Horticulture

Hugh Ronalds (4 March 1760 – 18 November 1833) was a nurseryman and horticulturalist in Brentford, who published Pyrus Malus Brentfordiensis: or, a Concise Description of Selected Apples (1831). His plants were some of the first European species to be shipped to Australia when the British colony was founded.

== Life and family ==
Born with a twin brother John, who died young, they were the fourth and fifth children of Hugh Ronalds Snr and Mary née Clarke. His younger brother Francis was the father of inventor Sir Francis Ronalds.

Hugh married his cousin Elizabeth Clarke and had ten children. The family held Unitarian beliefs and Hugh served as a trustee and treasurer of the Boston Chapel (now the Brentford Free Church) in Boston Manor Road, which his father and others had founded.

He lived all his life in an Elizabethan house adjacent to the vicarage of St Lawrence's church on Brentford High Street, and his youngest son Robert died in the same house in 1880. The home’s contents were then shipped to Hugh and Elizabeth’s only great-grandchild Lucy Harris née Ronalds in London, Ontario, and much survives today in the Eldon House museum and the University of Western Ontario archives. Elizabeth's handwritten recipe book is held at the Thomas Fisher Rare Book Library in Toronto and is available on the web.

== Ronalds Nursery ==
Hugh Ronalds Snr had established a nursery in Brentford in the late 1750s, at the same time that his friend William Aiton began to create what became the Kew Gardens on the opposite bank of the Thames. The two gardens benefited from their close relationship over many years.

Hugh and his older brother Henry Clarke Ronalds inherited the nursery on their father's death, with Hugh undertaking most of the management. He continued the steady expansion Hugh Snr had begun and by the time of his death had acquired nursery grounds at Brentford Butts; Brentford End (incorporating the former home of Attorney-general William Noy); Isleworth; Blondin/Niagara Streets, Northfields; Little Ealing; and East Bedfont, to supplement the home nursery near St Lawrence's.

Three of his sons entered the business – Hugh Clarke, John and Robert. John took on proprietorship of the nursery after Hugh's death, and Robert’s decease later brought the firm to an end. One of the other horticulturalists who had received training at the nursery was Dr Robert Hogg.

The nursery's clients included the Duke of Northumberland (who held nearby Syon House); the Clitherow family at Boston Manor; the Duke of Devonshire at Chiswick House; Robert Child at Osterley Park; and, further afield, the Duke of Buccleuch at Dalkeith Palace in Scotland. Capability Brown also purchased plants from the nursery.

=== Plant import and export ===
Always seeking to increase their array of nursery stock, the family imported little-known plants from overseas and shared specimens with the Kew Gardens, the Horticultural Society's garden and its members, and various estates around the country.

They also exported specimens around the world. Sir Joseph Banks asked Hugh to provide seeds, plants and trees for the new colony in Australia and gardeners tended them on their long journey there. The ships used included HMS Guardian (1789) and HMS Porpoise (1799 and 1800). Hugh also supplied trees for William Bligh's second breadfruit voyage to Australia, Tahiti and the West Indies in 1791 in HMS Providence and other plants later travelled to New Zealand.

=== Plant breeding ===
The family were active horticultural scientists. In his youth, Hugh created a herbarium as part of his studies and some of his original specimens survive today in the botanical volumes on display in Eldon House. Both Hugh and his son John were elected Fellows of the Horticultural Society and published papers on their work. The Horticultural Society leased part of Hugh's nursery ground at Little Ealing for a short time as their experimental garden.

Apples were long a specialism of the nursery and, by the late 1820s, the fruit of over 300 cultivars in their orchards was on display. Renowned horticultural author John Claudius Loudon urged Hugh to publish his research findings. The book was published in 1831, beautifully illustrated by lithographs prepared by his daughter Elizabeth (known as Betsey). It was dedicated to the 3rd Duke of Northumberland and was very well received in the literature.

=== Cemetery landscaping and planting ===
In a further illustration of the range of their business, the Ronalds family landscaped and planted at least two of the large commercial cemeteries established in the 19th century: the Kensal Green Cemetery in West London and the London Road Cemetery at Coventry.
