= Northfields, London =

Coordinates: 51.500°N 0.315°W

Northfields
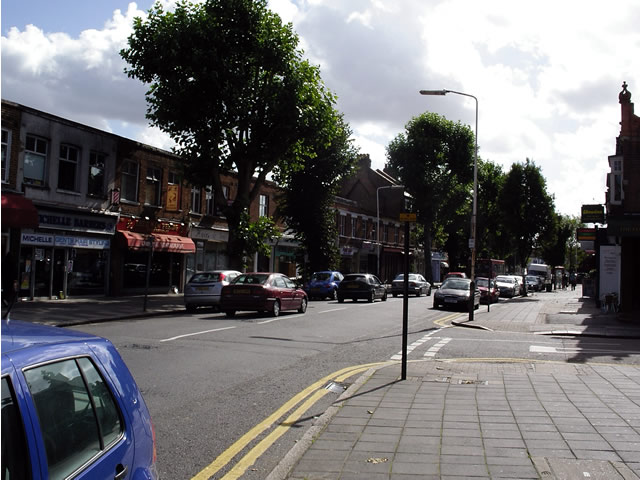
- Northfield Avenue

- Location within Greater London
- OS grid reference: TQ153802
- London borough: Ealing
- Ceremonial county: Greater London
- Region: London
- Country: England
- Sovereign state: United Kingdom
- Post town: LONDON
- Postcode district: W13, W5
- Dialling code: 020
- Police: Metropolitan
- Fire: London
- Ambulance: London
- UK Parliament: Ealing Southall
- London Assembly: Ealing and Hillingdon

Northfields is an area in Ealing, west London. It is centred on Northfield Avenue, a shopping street of mostly independent shops and restaurants. It lies partially in the Ealing W5 and partially in west Ealing's W13 postcode. It lies in the southwest corner of Ealing.

From the 14th century this area was part of the manor of Coldhall, or West Ealing. Great and Little Northfields were two large fields in the late Middle Ages, lying in the extreme west of Ealing parish. By the mid-17th century, Northfields Road as it was first called, was constructed to connect Little Ealing (next to South Ealing) to the road to Uxbridge (the current Uxbridge Road running from Shepherds Bush to Uxbridge). Yet the area remained rural, covered in apple orchards into the late nineteenth century.

Today the area is served by the Piccadilly line from Northfields tube station designed by architect Charles Holden and by the E2 and E3 bus services running to Greenford, Ealing, Brentford, Hanwell, Acton and Chiswick, and the N11, a night bus to Central London. Northfields is a middle-class area, with high levels of education, employment and home ownership. It is home to three local authority primary schools, Little Ealing Primary School, Fielding Primary School, and Mount Carmel Catholic Primary School.

Northfield Avenue has an annual street festival organised by the local trade association, NABA (Northfield Avenue Business Association). The first festival was held in summer 2007.

== History ==
The Plough Inn which marks the junction of Little Ealing Lane and Northfield Avenue was in existence by 1722. Maps of Ealing from 1890 and before show Northfields as almost entirely rural, with just a few houses along Little Ealing Lane. The rest of the area was largely orchards. The arrival of the District Railway in 1883, and the opening of the Northfields Halt in 1908, prompted development of the area.

== Notable residents ==
The acrobat and tightrope walker Charles Blondin was best known for his crossing of Niagara Falls on a tightrope. Blondin retired to live in Northfields from 1886 until his death in 1897 in a house on the site of what is now Niagara House, opposite The Plough pub on Northfield Avenue. Blondin Avenue, Blondin Park and Niagara Avenue are named after him; they were formerly the site of part of Hugh Ronalds' renowned nursery.

Between 1815 and 1817 John Quincy Adams, later to become the 6th President of the United States lived with his family at Little Boston House in Windmill Road in Little Ealing in Northfields.

The pop singer Dusty Springfield was a pupil at St Anne's Convent School on Little Ealing Lane in the 1950s.

The BBC Weather presenter Tomasz Schafernaker lives in this area.

== Notable buildings ==
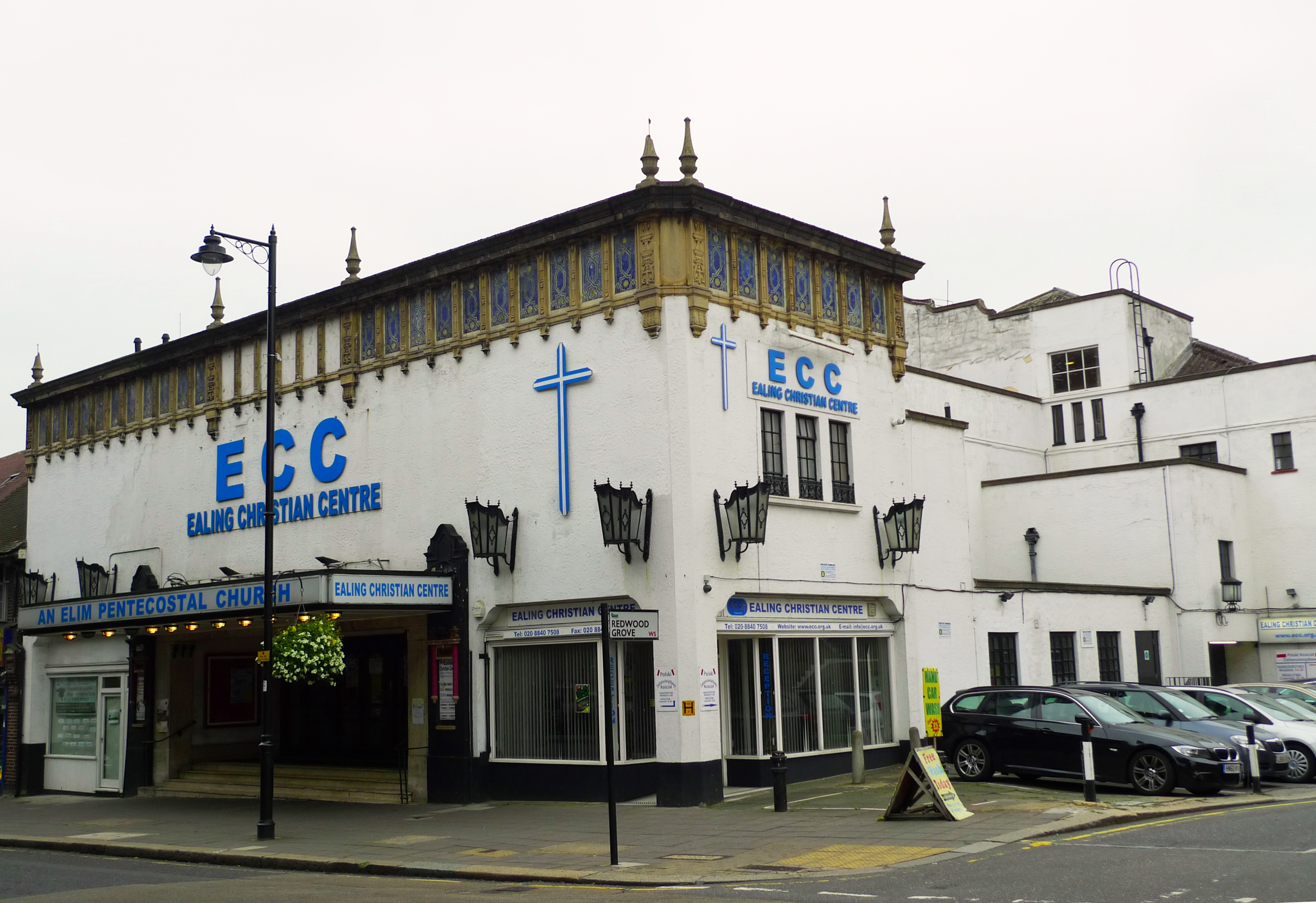
Former ODEON cinema, now Ealing Christian Centre

A former cinema on Northfield Avenue is a Grade II* listed building. Built in 1932 in an unusual Spanish style, it closed in 1987 and was converted into the Ealing Christian Centre in 1994.

Other Grade II listed buildings in Northfields are:

- Rochester House
- Place House (Ealing Fields High School)
- The Forester public house, architect Nowell Parr
- Northfields tube station
- 53 Northfield Road (Orchard Lofts)
