= The Angel, Hayes =

Listed pub in the London Borough of Hillingdon

The Angel
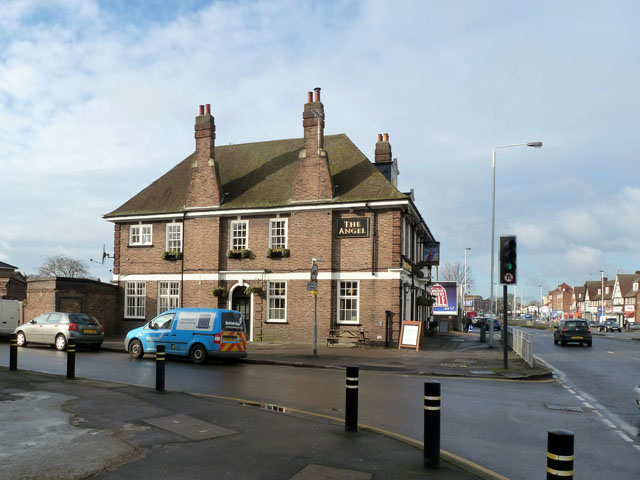
- The pub in 2015

General information
- Status: Vacant
- Type: Public house (former)
- Location: 697 Uxbridge Road, Hayes, Hillingdon, England
- Coordinates: 51.524934°N 0.433305°W
- Year built: 1926; 100 years ago
- Renovated: 1937 and c. 1970 (extended)
- Closed: 2018
- Client: Fuller's Brewery

Design and construction
- Architect: Nowell Parr
- Designations

Listed Building – Grade II
- Official name: The Angel PH
- Designated: 13 February 2015
- Reference no.: 1422617

The Angel is a Grade II listed former public house on Uxbridge Road in Hayes, west London, England. Built in 1926 to the designs of Nowell Parr for Fuller's Brewery and extended in 1937 and around 1970, it is included on CAMRA's National Inventory of Historic Pub Interiors with a three‑star rating for "outstanding national historic importance". The pub closed in late 2018 and was sold to the Hayes Muslim Centre, which submitted planning applications in 2019 and 2021 for community and religious uses; both were withdrawn. CAMRA reported that the property returned to the market in late 2023, and its future remains uncertain as of October 2026.

== History ==
The building dates from 1926 and was designed by Nowell Parr for Fuller's Brewery; it was enlarged in 1937 and again around 1970.

In 2015 it was designated a listed building by Historic England. The interior is recognised by the Campaign for Real Ale (CAMRA), which includes it on the National Inventory of Historic Pub Interiors with a three‑star rating, indicating "outstanding national historic importance".

The Angel closed towards the end of 2018, after Fuller's decided that the pub no longer aligned with the company's plans for its tenanted estate. The brewery noted that The Angel had been part of its portfolio for more than 150 years but was among a number of sites identified for disposal as part of a wider restructuring.

The building was later sold to the Hayes Muslim Centre, which submitted two planning applications: one proposing an Islamic community centre on the ground floor with a house in multiple occupation above, amended in 2019, and another in 2021 seeking use as a place of worship and community centre. Both applications were withdrawn. According to CAMRA, the property was placed back on the market in late 2023. As of October 2026 there is no publicly available information regarding its status or future.

== Architecture ==
=== Exterior ===
The building is made of brown brick with a clay‑tiled roof and stands on a corner plot where Angel Lane meets Uxbridge Road. It has a roughly square layout, and the internal plan has changed little since it was built. The ground floor contains five separate rooms, each with its own entrance, arranged around a central counter. At the front are the saloon bar and public bar, with a small off‑sales room between them; behind are two dining rooms, with the manager's office and hallway in the centre. A small toilet block stands to the south‑east, originally open to the street but later linked to the building. On the west side is a lean‑to section with a bottle store, porch and toilets; this once continued as an open verandah, but the space was absorbed into the rear dining room during later extensions. The first floor includes a meeting room used for many years by the local Masonic lodge, along with former service rooms, and the attic contains living accommodation.

The exterior combines Arts and Crafts influences with a restrained Georgian character. The main front to the Uxbridge Road is arranged in seven bays, with brick corner features framing the centre. The ground floor has metal‑framed windows and three round‑arched doorways, the central one leading to the former off‑sales room. The first floor has timber sash windows set above a plain band, and a small curved balcony sits over the central doorway. The steep hipped roof has wide eaves and two dormers flanking a square chimney. The Angel Lane side is marked by two broad chimney‑breasts rising into tall stacks. To the west, facing the yard, is a hip‑roofed lean‑to containing the bottle store and toilets; its right‑hand end, once part of the verandah, was rebuilt in the 1970s as a flat‑roofed addition.

=== Interior ===
Inside, the layout has changed little apart from later enlargements to the luncheon room. The ground‑floor rooms share beamed ceilings and timber panelling to dado height. The saloon bar keeps its original glazed lobby, curved counter and a large brick fireplace with tile decoration. Its counter includes outward‑opening hatches giving access to the beer engines. Next to it is the off‑sales room, a narrow space reached only from the street and from behind the bar. Beyond lies the public bar, which also has a glazed lobby, a curved counter with hinged doors, and a cast‑iron fire surround finished to resemble timber. The meal room has a blocked fireplace and a disused service hatch. The luncheon room, enlarged twice to form a large function space, contains timber panelling, a grained cast‑iron fireplace, a canted counter with hinged doors and a coloured glass skylight likely dating from the 1930s.

The central servery keeps much of its original fittings, including bar‑back shelving, under‑counter storage and a glazed screen between the saloon bar and off‑sales room. The manager's office has a glazed door and windows overlooking the bars, including a cashier's window linked to the safe, which remains in place. A rear corridor connects by steps and a dumbwaiter to the cellar below and the former kitchen above.

The brick‑lined cellar partly survives from an earlier building and contains two drops for lowering barrels and a hoist for raising bottled beer. The main stair has simple timber balusters and newels and leads to the upper floors, where the rooms have plain four‑panel doors. The first‑floor meeting room has an Art Deco fireplace, and the former kitchen retains built‑in cupboards and a drying hoist. Some attic bedrooms have decorative iron fireplaces.

== See also ==
- List of pubs in London
