= Blondin Park =

Park in Northfields, London, England

Coordinates: 51.4952°N 0.3203°W

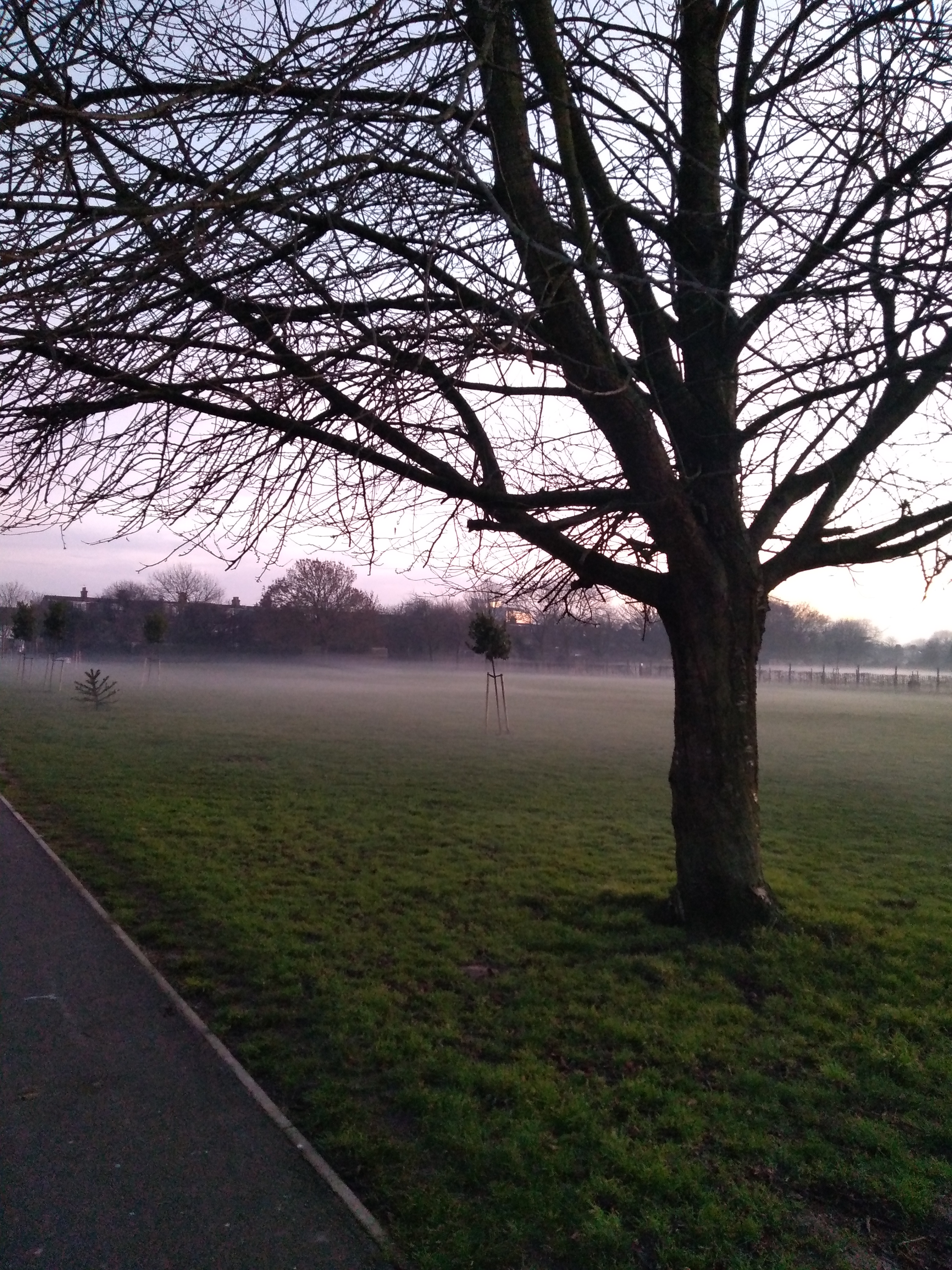
A photo of Blondin Park taken overlooking the main parkland.

Blondin Park is an 8.5-hectare (21-acre) public park in Northfields in the London Borough of Ealing. It has allotments area and sports pitches. It is owned by Ealing Council and managed by the Council together with the Friends of Blondin Park. An area of 2.3 ha (5.7 acres) in the south-west corner is a Local Nature Reserve, and the nature area and allotments are a Site of Local Importance for Nature Conservation.

== History ==
The site was acquired by the Municipal Borough of Ealing in 1928 and opened as a public park called Northfields Recreation Ground. In 1957, it was renamed Blondin Park after Charles Blondin, who lived locally in Niagara House. The Blondin Nature Area was created in 1997.

== Ecology ==
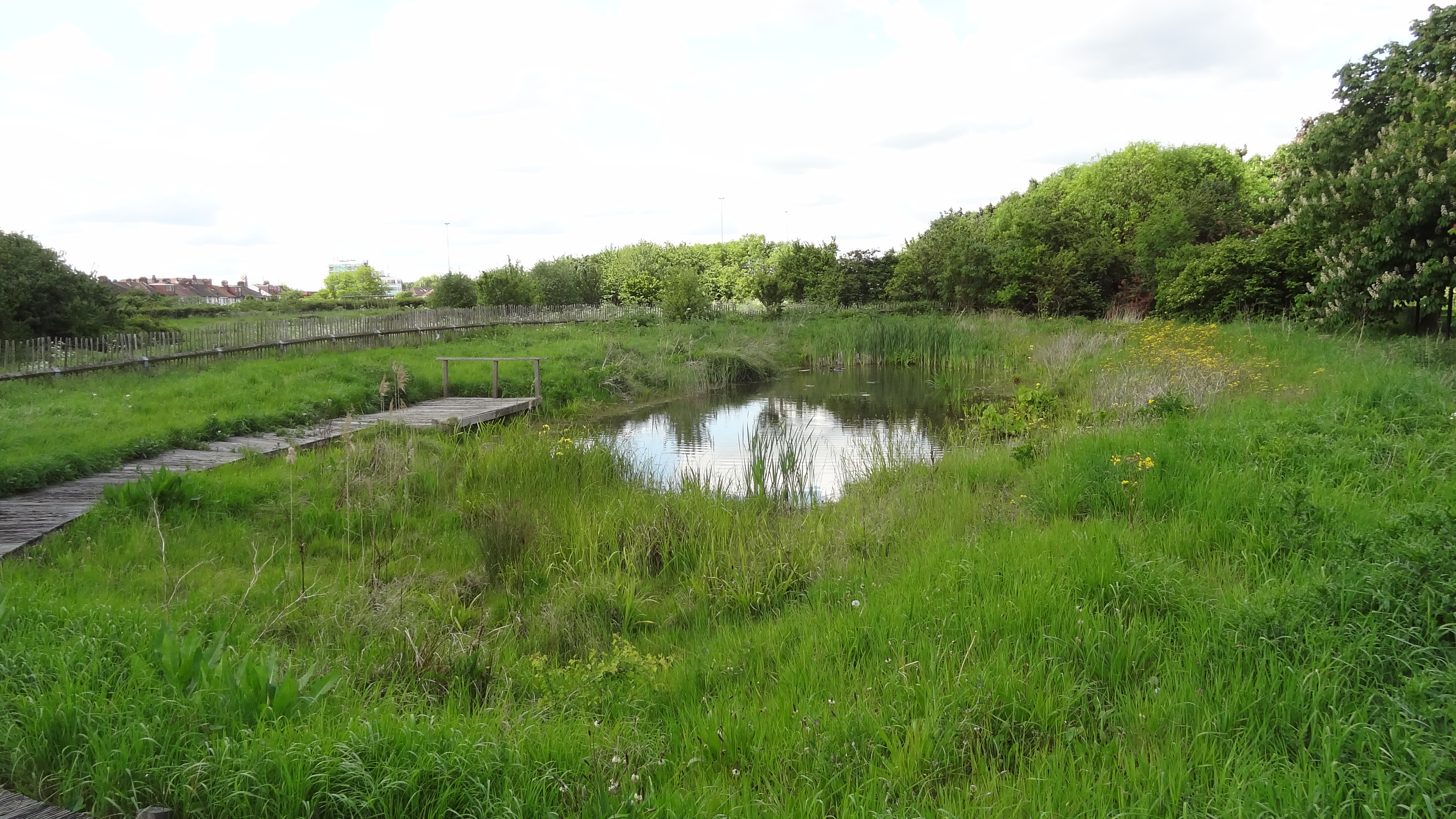

The nature reserve has a variety of habitats, including a wildflower meadow and a pond, where wetland plants have been introduced such as lesser pond-sedge, sharp-flowered rush and greater spearwort.

== Access ==
There is access from Boston Manor Road.
