= Brentford Urban District =

Former local government area in the UK

Coordinates: 51.487°N 0.300°W

Brentford
- Area
  - 1901: 1,091 acres (4.4 km^{2})
  - 1921: 1,091 acres (4.4 km^{2})
- Population
  - 1901: 15,171
  - 1921: 17,032
- History
  - Created: 1874
  - Abolished: 1927
  - Succeeded by: Brentford and Chiswick Urban District
- Status: Local board (1874 - 1894); Urban district (from 1894)
  - HQ: Old Brentford

Brentford was a local government district in the county of Middlesex, England, from 1874 to 1927.

Brentford Local Government District was created in 1874 under the Local Government Act 1858 and covered the civil parish of New Brentford and the chapelry of Old Brentford in the parish of Ealing. The district was governed by a local board of twelve members.

The Local Government Act 1894 reconstituted the local board's area as an urban district, and Brentford Urban District Council replaced the local board. The urban district consisted of two civil parishes of old and New Brentford.

The local board was originally based at the Market House, Old Brentford. This building was shared with the county court and petty sessions. The UDC subsequently moved their offices to Clifden House in Boston Manor Road.

In 1903, the council built Brentford Public Library.

In 1927 Brentford UD was amalgamated with the neighbouring Chiswick Urban District to form Brentford and Chiswick Urban District.
