= Municipal Borough of Brentford and Chiswick =

Local government district in England

Coordinates: 51.4911°N 0.2655°W

Brentford and Chiswick
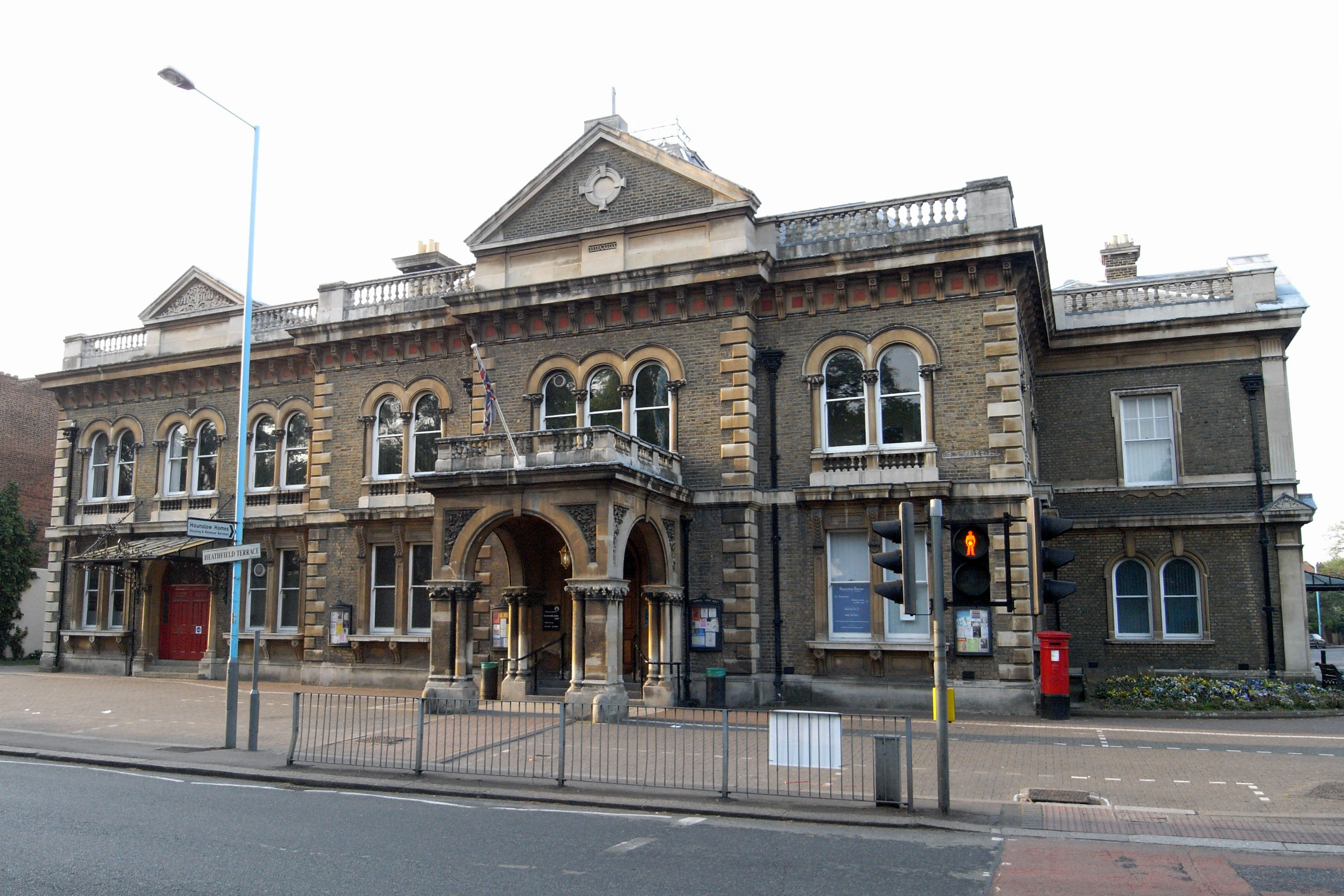
- Chiswick Town Hall

- Brentford and Chiswick within Middlesex in 1961
- Area
  - 1931: 2,341 acres (9.5 km^{2})
  - 1961: 2,333 acres (9.4 km^{2})
- Population
  - 1921: 57,970 (equivalent area)
  - 1961: 54,833
- History
  - Created: 1927
  - Abolished: 1965
  - Succeeded by: London Borough of Hounslow
- Status: Urban district (until 1932); Municipal borough (from 1932)
- Government
  - Motto: Firmior (Stronger)
- Coat of arms of the borough council

Brentford and Chiswick was a local government district of Middlesex, England from 1927 to 1965.

== History ==
It was created an urban district in 1927 by a merger of the former area of the Brentford Urban District and the Chiswick Urban District. It gained the status of municipal borough in 1932. It included the parishes of Chiswick, New Brentford and Old Brentford.

In 1965 the municipal borough was abolished and its former area transferred to Greater London to be combined with that of other districts to form the London Borough of Hounslow.

Brentford and Chiswick was also the name of the parliamentary constituency that covered the area. The seat survived until just before the February 1974 general election, when it was expanded westwards and renamed Brentford and Isleworth.

== Coat of arms ==
Granted on 1 September 1932, the borough's coat of arms was: Per saltire argent and gules in chief a representation of St. Nicholas proper in base two bars wavy azure and in fesse as many seaxes (Saxon swords) the cutting edges inwards proper pommels and hilts or. Crest : Issuant out of a Saxon crown or a phoenix sable in flames proper. Supporters : On either side a griffin or gorged with a collar gemel wavy azure.

The arms incorporate the emblems which appeared on the seal of the former UDC, which displayed the figures of St. Nicholas in reference to the dedication of the parish church, together with three seaxes from the arms of Middlesex County Council. The blue waves, like those on the supporters, represent the River Brent and the Borough's situation beside the River Thames. The phoenix represents the new borough rising from the ashes of the old Urban District. The griffins appear to have no historical significance.
