= Brentford =

Suburb of West London, England

Coordinates: 51.486°N 0.310°W

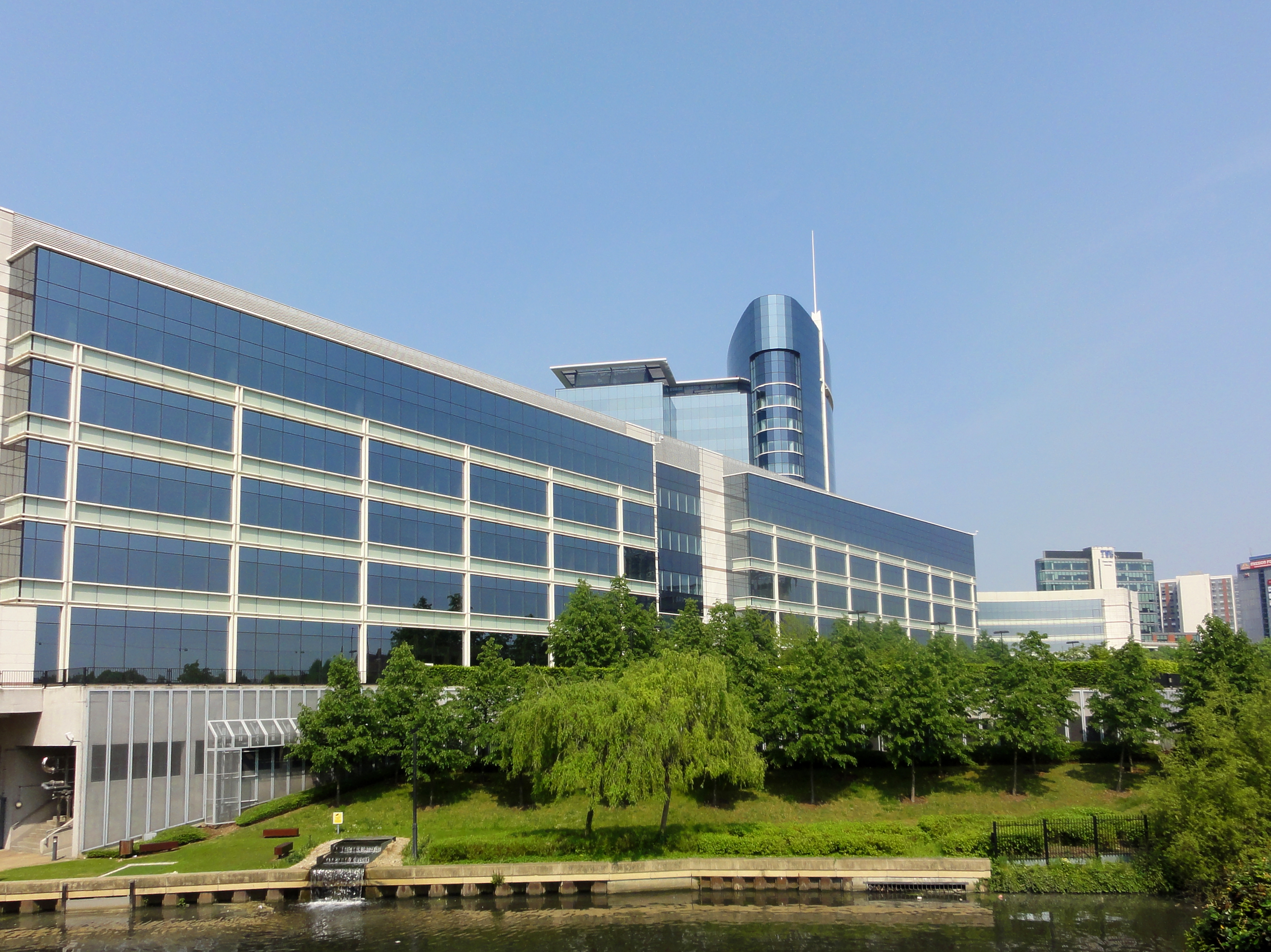
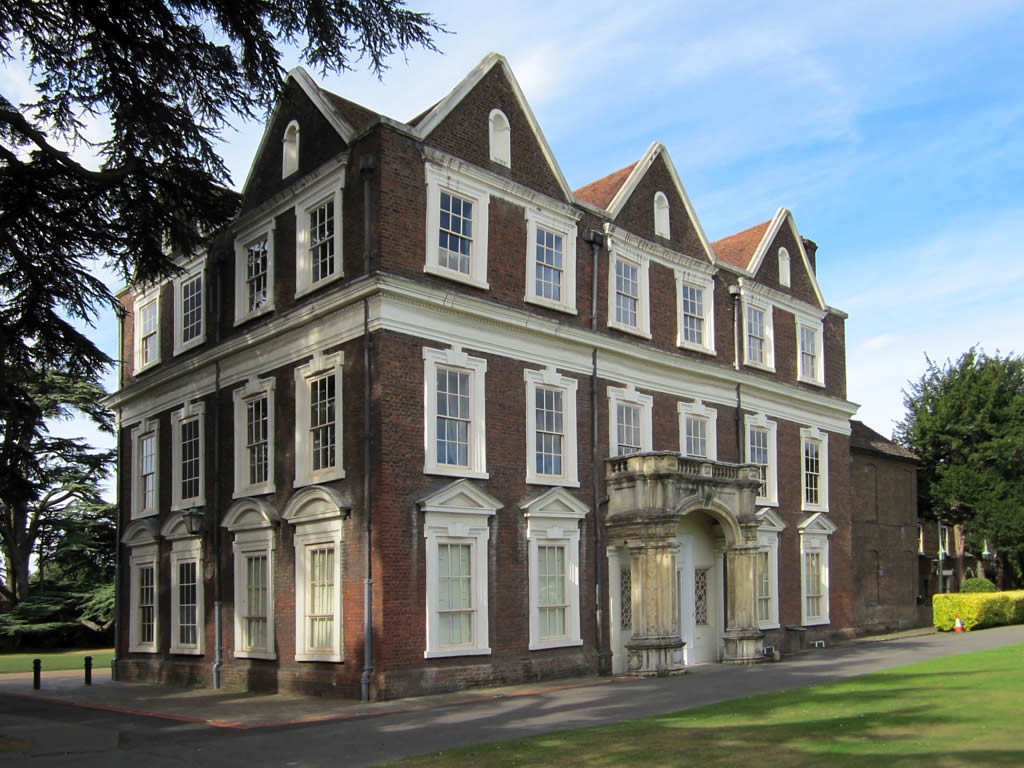
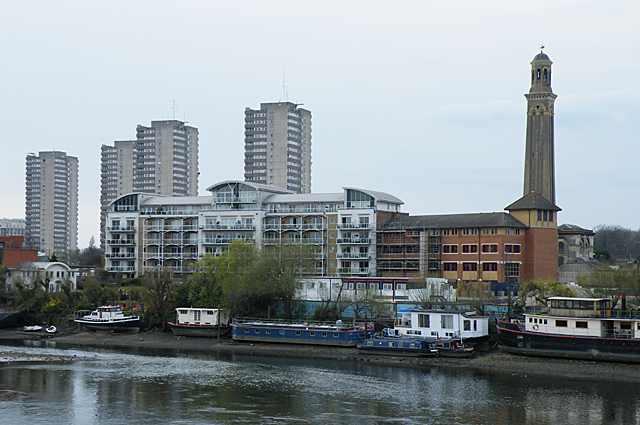
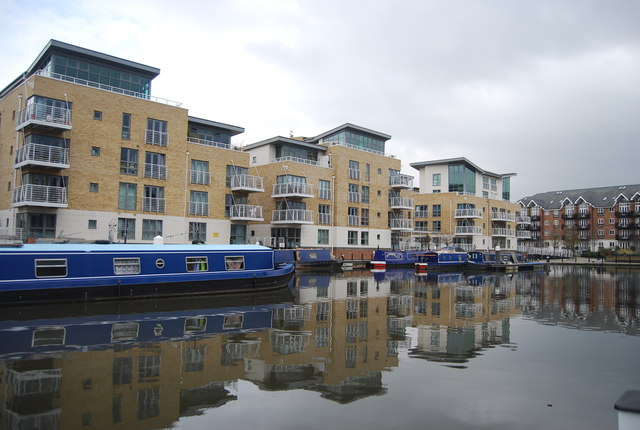
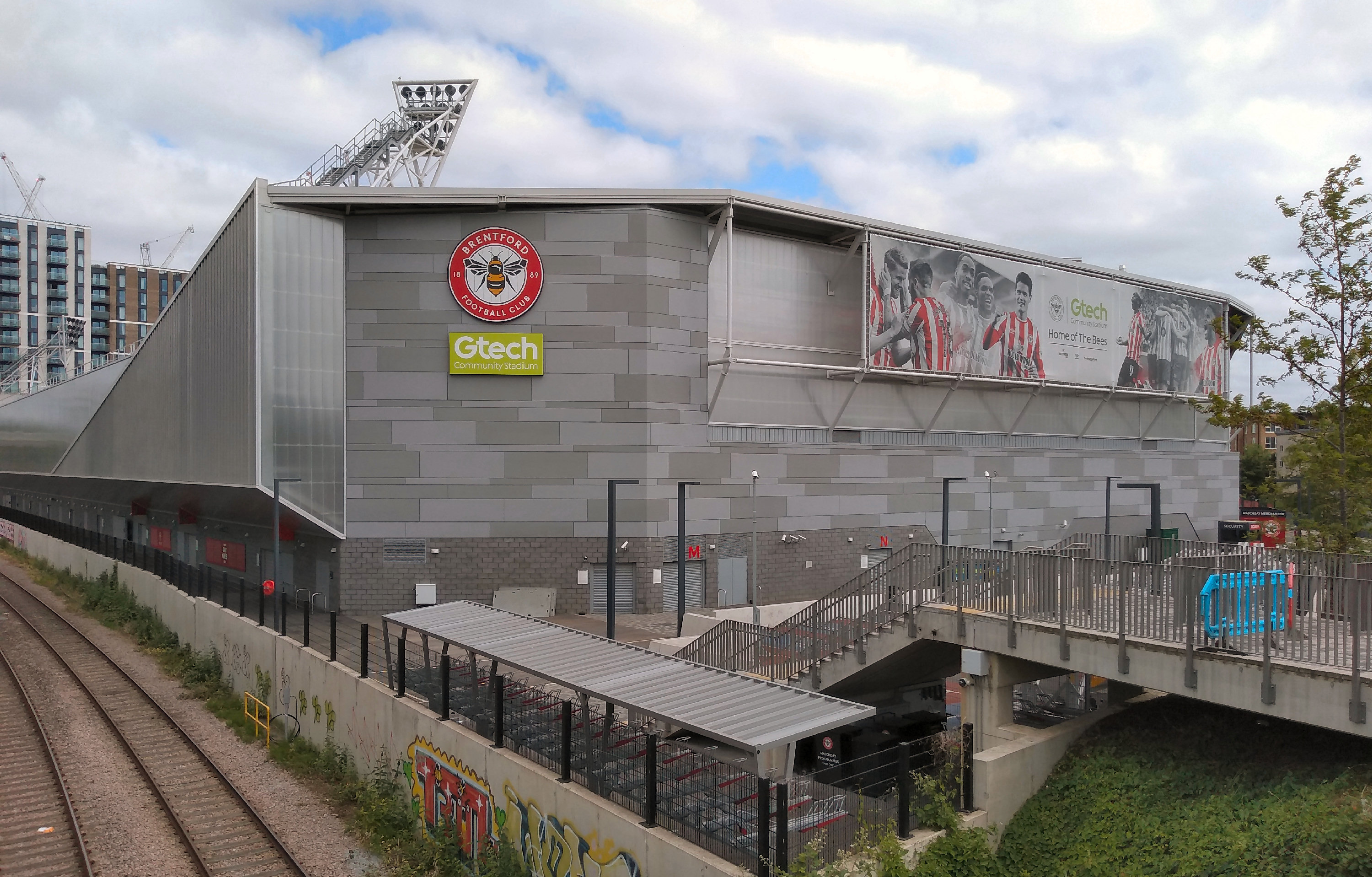
- GlaxoSmithKline Offices Boston Manor The Skyline from Kew Bridge Brentford Basin The Stadium

- Location within Greater London
- Area: 5.87 km^{2} (2.27 sq mi)
- Population: 27,907 (Syon, Brentford wards 2011)
  - Density: 4,754/km^{2} (12,310/sq mi)
- OS grid reference: TQ1878
  - Charing Cross: 8 mi (12.9 km) WNW
- London borough: Hounslow
- Ceremonial county: Greater London
- Region: London
- Country: England
- Sovereign state: United Kingdom
- Post town: BRENTFORD
- Postcode district: TW8
- Dialling code: 020
- Police: Metropolitan
- Fire: London
- Ambulance: London
- UK Parliament: Brentford and Isleworth
- London Assembly: South West

Brentford is a suburban town in West London, England and part of the London Borough of Hounslow. It lies at the confluence of the River Brent and the Thames, 8 miles (13 km) west of Charing Cross.

Brentford's economy features diverse company headquarter buildings which mark the start of the M4 corridor; the town has two railway stations and Boston Manor Underground station is on its northwest border with Hanwell. Brentford has a convenience shopping and dining venue grid of streets at its centre. Brentford at the start of the 21st century attracted regeneration of its little-used warehouse premises and docks including the remodelling of the waterfront to provide more economically active shops, townhouses and apartments, some of which comprise Brentford Dock.

A 19th- and 20th-century mixed social and private housing locality, New Brentford is contiguous with the Osterley neighbourhood of Isleworth and Syon Park and the Great West Road which has most of the largest business premises.

== History ==
=== Toponymy ===
The name is recorded as Breguntford in 705 in an Anglo-Saxon charter and means ford over the River Brent'.

The name of the river derives from * brigant-, a Brythonic word, meaning "high" or "elevated" (possibly in a holy sense). The river may also have been associated with the goddess Brigantia. The suffix '-ford' is Old English. The ford was most likely located where the main road crossed the river. New Brentford is recorded as Newe Braynford in 1521 and was previously known as Westbraynford. Old Brentford is recorded as Old Braynford in 1476 and was previously known as Estbraynford.

=== Early Brentford ===
The settlement pre-dates the Roman occupation of Britain, and thus pre-dates the founding of nearby London. Many pre-Roman artefacts have been excavated in and around the area in Brentford known as 'Old England'. Bronze Age pottery and burnt flints have been found at separate sites in Brentford. The quality and quantity of the artefacts suggests that Brentford was a meeting point for pre-Romanic tribes. One well known Iron Age piece from about 100 BC – AD 50 is the Brentford horn-cap – a ceremonial chariot fitting that formed part of local antiquarian Thomas Layton's collection, now held by the Museum of London. The Celtic knot pattern (the 'Brentford Knot') on this item has been copied for use on modern jewellery.

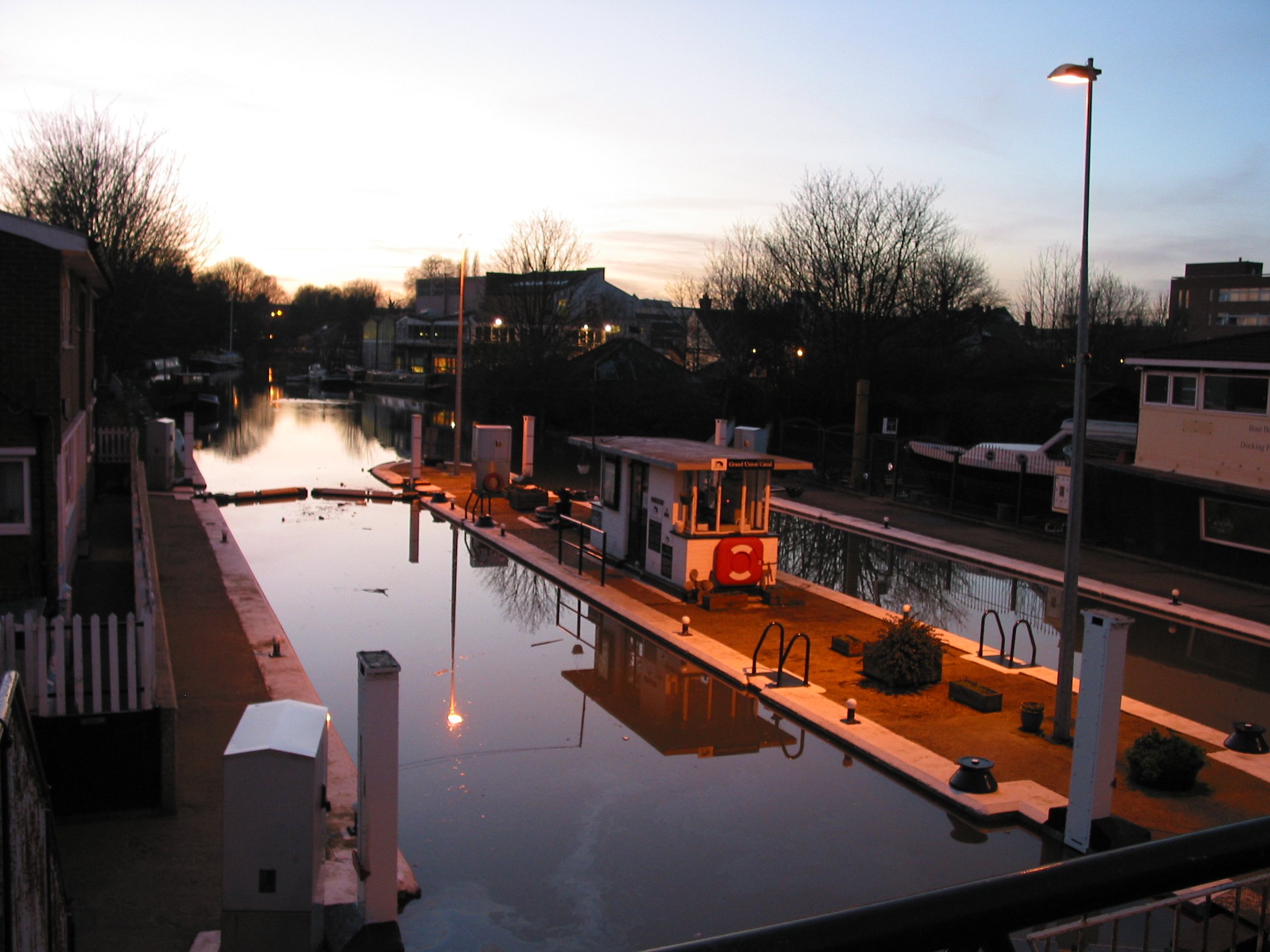
The Thames Lock on the Grand Union Canal at Brentford

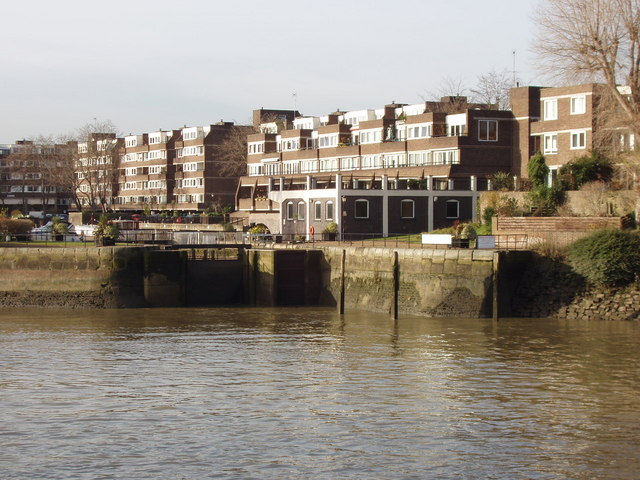
Brentford Dock lock gates and Justin Close

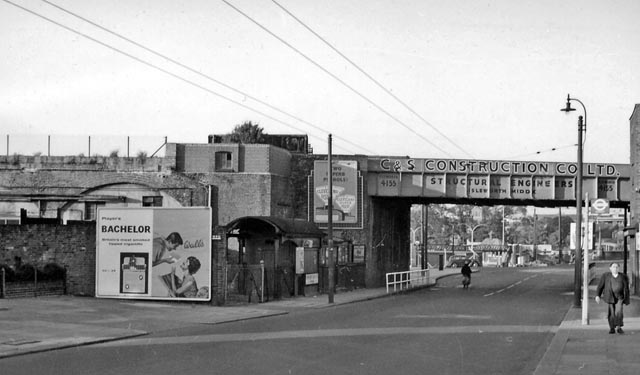
The former Brentford GWR Station on Brentford High Street

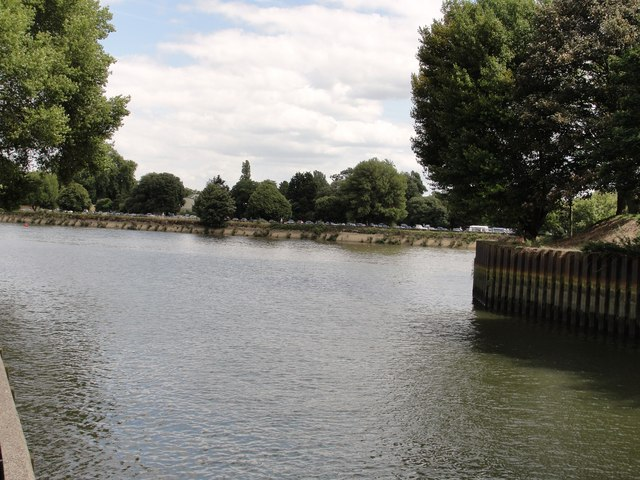
Confluence of Rivers Thames and Brent at Brentford

Local history accounts and an inscription outside the County Court claim that Julius Cæsar crossed the Thames here during his invasion of Britain in 54 BC, and fought a battle with Cassivellaunus close by. Cæsar describes the place as fortified with sharp stakes. The discovery of sharp stakes in the riverside at Brentford Dock in the early 20th century was taken by Montagu Sharpe as evidence of a fortified crossing-site, and Caesar's battle. The stakes were removed as a hazard to river traffic, and Sharpe's claims are not supported by further excavations.

Historically part of Middlesex, in the southeastern corner of Elthorne Hundred, it has formed part of Greater London since 1965.

=== English Civil War ===
In November 1642 a Royalist army advancing on London overcame a much smaller Parliamentarian force in battle at Brentford. The town was ransacked in the immediate aftermath of the engagement.

=== Local fair ===
A local town fair, the Brentford Festival, has been held in Brentford every September since 1900.

=== Brentford Dock ===
The building of Brentford Dock was started in 1855 and it was formally opened in 1859. The dock yard is now a marina and housing estate.

=== The Hardwick family ===
A notable family from Brentford was the 18th-/19th-century architectural father and son partnership, the Hardwicks. Thomas Hardwick Senior (1725–1798) and Thomas Hardwick Junior (1752–1829) were both from Brentford and are buried in the old church of St Laurence. Hardwick Senior was the master mason for the Adam Brothers during the construction of Syon House. Hardwick Junior assisted in the building of Somerset House and was known for his designs of churches in the capital. He was also a tutor of J. M. W. Turner and he helped start Turner's illustrious career in art. Both father and son did a great deal of remodelling and rebuilding on the church of St Laurence.

=== Timeline ===
- 781 Council of Brentford recording settlement of a dispute between King Offa of Mercia, and the Bishop of Worcester
- 1016 Battle of Brentford between the invading Canute and Edmund Ironside
- 1431 Relocation of Syon Abbey to Brentford from Twickenham
- 1539 Destruction of Syon Abbey by King Henry VIII
- 1616 – 1617 Pocahontas, a Native American woman, belonging to the Powhatan people, resided in Brentford with her husband, John Rolfe and son Thomas.
- 1642 Battle of Brentford during the English Civil War
- 1682 "A very violent storm of rain, accompanied with thunder and lightning, caused a sudden flood, which did great damage to the town of Brentford."
- 1717 Brentford Turnpike Trust founded to maintain the road between Kensington and Hounslow
- 1756 Ronalds nursery established by Hugh Ronalds' father on Brentford High Street (closed 1880)
- 1805 Start of operations of the Grand Junction Canal (later the Grand Union Canal)
- 1806 James Montgomrey's father James Montgomrey Snr commenced operating a large timber mill at Montgomrey's Wharf, a yard formerly occupied by his cousin (relocated 1911)
- 1815 – 1817 John Quincy Adams, sixth President of the US, lived in Brentford.
- 1828 William Corder was arrested on Wednesday 23 April at Everley Grove House, Ealing Lane in Brentford, for the notorious Red Barn Murder.
- 1841 Brentford was flooded, caused by the Brent Reservoir becoming overfull so that the overflow cut a breach in the earth dam. Several lives lost.
- 1849 Start of operations of the Hounslow Loop line, providing service to Kew Bridge, Brentford Central and Syon Lane stations in the Brentford area.
- 1859 Start of operations of the Great Western & Brentford Railway, built in part on James Montgomrey's land and linking Brentford Dock to the Great Western Railway main line at Southall. Additional passenger station named 'Brentford Town' later constructed just north of Brentford High Street.
- 1884 Start of operations of Boston Manor Underground station (then known as Boston Road).
- 1889 Brentford Football Club founded by a rowing club seeking a winter sport.
- 30 May 1925 – Great West Road officially opened by King George V. Later the Brentford section became known as the Golden Mile due to the large number of factories that relocated there to take advantage of the good communications. The factories provided high employment and stimulation to the local economy.
- 1 January 1929 – Grand Junction Canal bought by the Regent's Canal and amalgamated with other canals to form the Grand Union Canal.
- 1965 Opening of elevated section of M4 motorway.

== Local government ==
Brentford developed around the ancient boundary between the parishes of Ealing and Hanwell. It was divided between the chapelry of Old Brentford to the east in Ealing and the chapelry of New Brentford in Hanwell to the west. Of the two areas, Old Brentford was significantly larger.

New Brentford was first described as the county town of Middlesex in 1789, on the basis that it was the location of elections of knights for the shire (or Members of Parliament (MPs)) from 1701. In 1795 New Brentford (as it was then) was "considered as the county-town; but there is no town-hall or other public building" causing confusion that remains to this day (see county town of Middlesex).

The London Borough of Hounslow was formed in 1965, under the London Government Act 1963, by the merger of the areas of the Municipal Borough of Brentford and Chiswick, the Municipal Borough of Heston and Isleworth and Feltham Urban District of Middlesex.

== Demography and housing ==
2011 Census homes
Ward	Detached	Semi-detached	Terraced	Flats and apartments	Caravans/temporary/mobile homes/houseboats	Shared between households
Brentford	150	826	1,425	3,511	17	25
Syon (most homes in the ward are in New Brentford)	147	806	1,488	3,299	33	17

2011 Census households
Ward	Population	Households	% Owned outright	% Owned with a loan	hectares
Brentford	14,353	5,954	15	23	315
Syon	13,554	5,790	16	28	272

In Brentford, those who ethnically identify as BAME (Black, Asian and minority Ethnic) was 33.9% in the Brentford ward and 34.2% in the Syon ward at the 2011 UK census. The median age of the population was 32 years in Brentford ward and 34 years in Syon ward. Both wards have about equal proportions of household types, with flats/maisonettes/apartments forming a majority in both wards.

== Economy ==
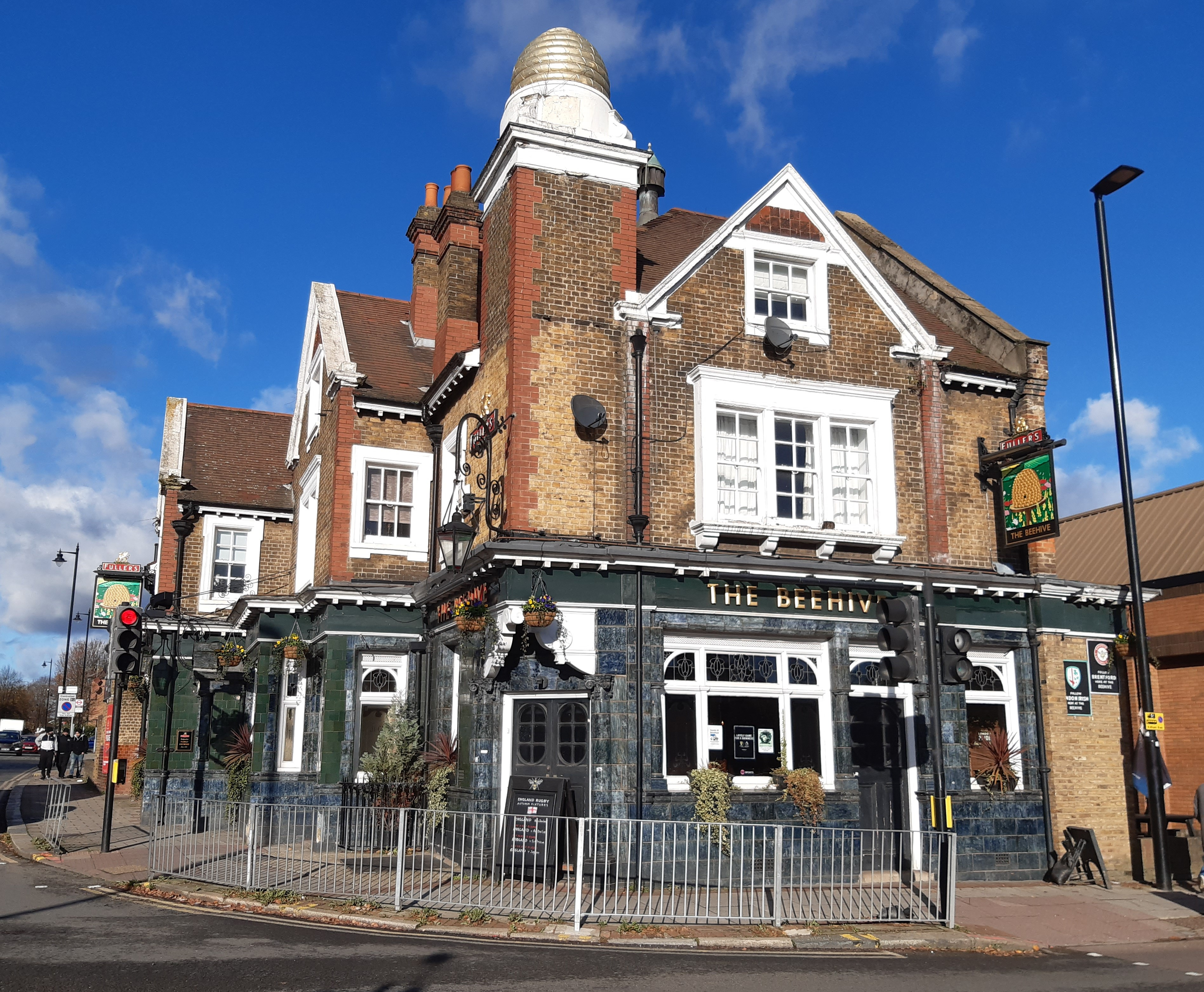
The Beehive pub

- Allianz Cornhill Animal Health
- Brompton Bicycle (Headquarters), manufacturer of folding bicycles was based here for many years, but moved to a new factory in Greenford, Ealing in 2017
- Carillion
- Datapoint (Headquarters)*
- Global Blue (previously Global Refund) (Formerly the EMC Corporation HQ, aka 'EMC Tower')
- E.M.Tool Designs (Ltd) (Headquarters)
- Heidelberg Graphic Equipment Ltd. (subsidiary of Heidelberger Druckmaschinen AG)
- JCDecaux UK
- Sega Europe has its head office in Brentford
- Sky
- Tie Rack Corporate Neckwear
- ViiV Healthcare
- WorleyParsons (Greater London offices)

== Landmarks ==
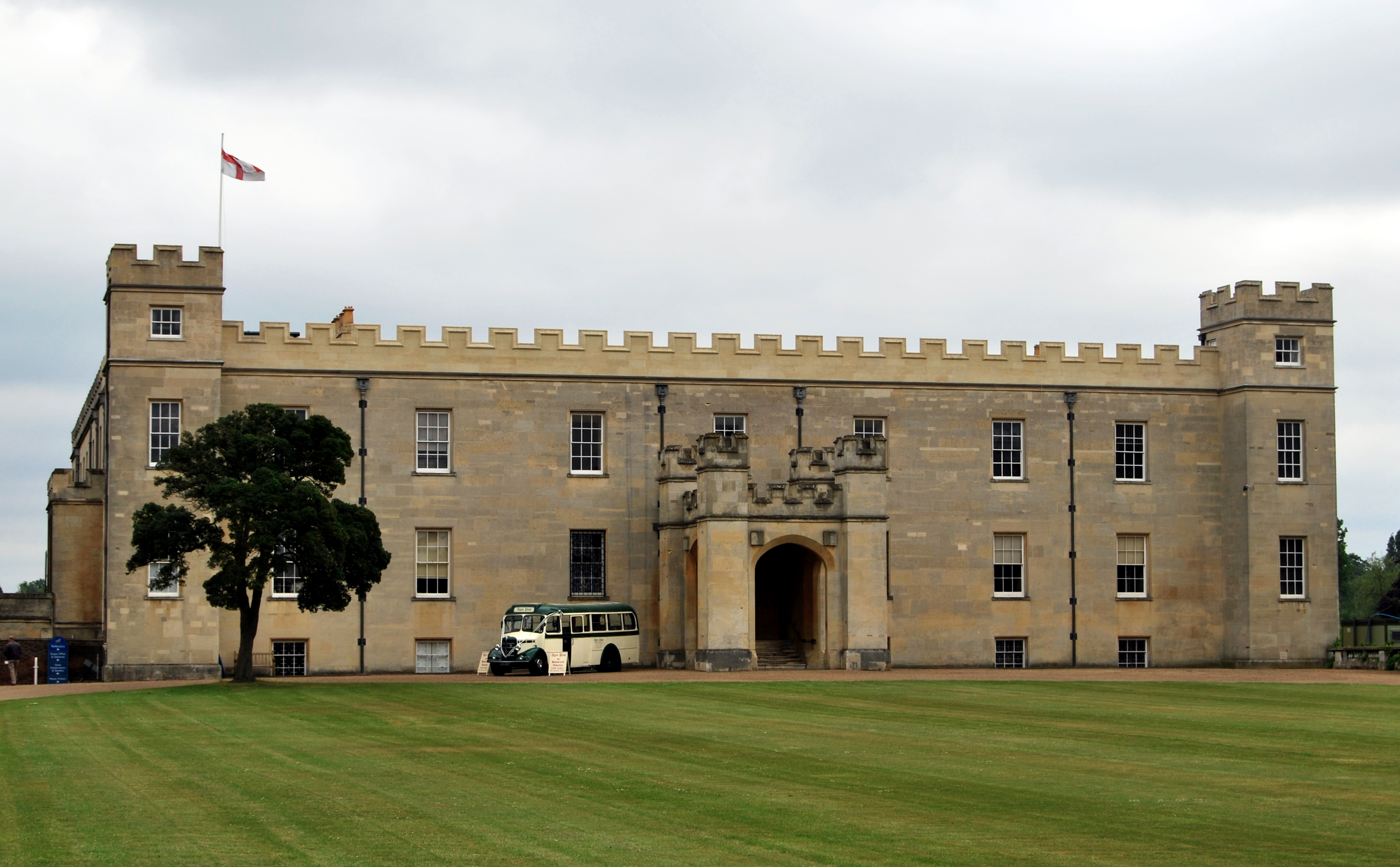
Syon House

=== The Syon estate ===
Syon House, the Greater London residence of the Duke of Northumberland, is a large mansion and park in Syon ward, described above, that has long been shared with Isleworth. Some of its seasonally marshy land is now a public nature reserve. The estate has a hotel (Hilton London Syon Park), visitor centre and garden centre.

Syon Abbey, demolished and replaced (with reworked gatehouses) by the newer mansion, had the largest abbey church in England in the Middle Ages.

The location of Syon Abbey in the park was unknown until archeological investigations in the grounds in 2003 (for the television series Time Team) and 2004 revealed the foundations of the abbey church. It was larger than Westminster Abbey is now, but no above-ground structure remains. There were complex reasons for its destruction.

The London Butterfly House in Syon Park was an insectarium like a large glasshouse containing a butterfly zoo. Visitors could see butterflies and moths flying about, feeding, and emerging from chrysalises. There was also a colony of large ants (kept with the butterflies), a small tropical bird aviary, and a small gallery of reptiles, amphibians, insects and spiders. The lease on the current site expired in October 2007 and the Butterfly House closed on 28 October.

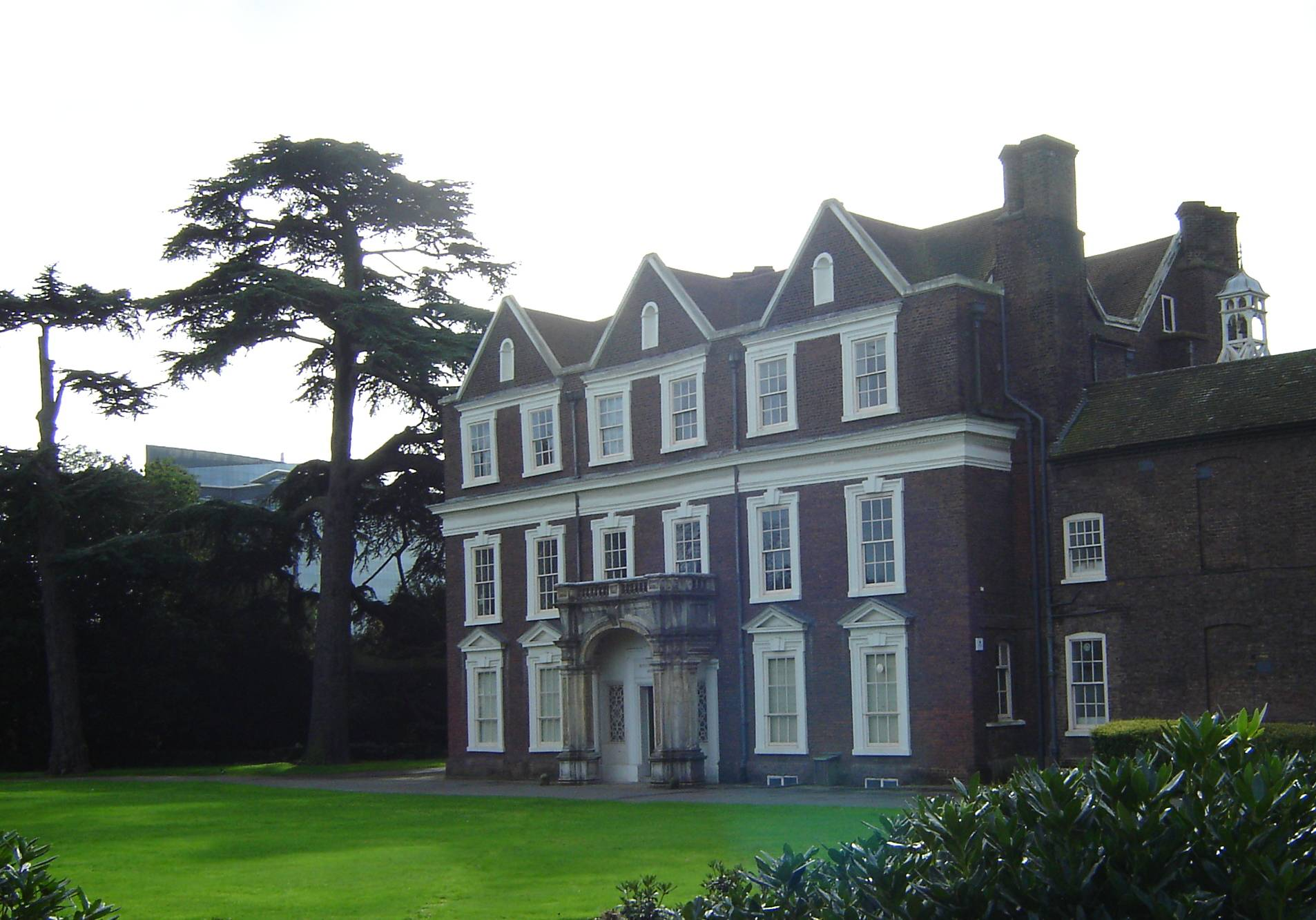
Front of Boston Manor House

Boston Manor House, built in 1622, is a Jacobean manor house, noted for its fine plasterwork ceilings.

Syon Park House (demolished in 1953, and not to be confused with Syon House itself) housed the 'Syon Park Academy' where the poet Percy Bysshe Shelley was educated between the ages of 10 and 12 before moving on to Eton. A Royal Mail depot stands on the site now. This may also be the site of the dwelling where Pocahontas lived in Brentford End between 1616 and 1617.

=== Brentford Monument ===
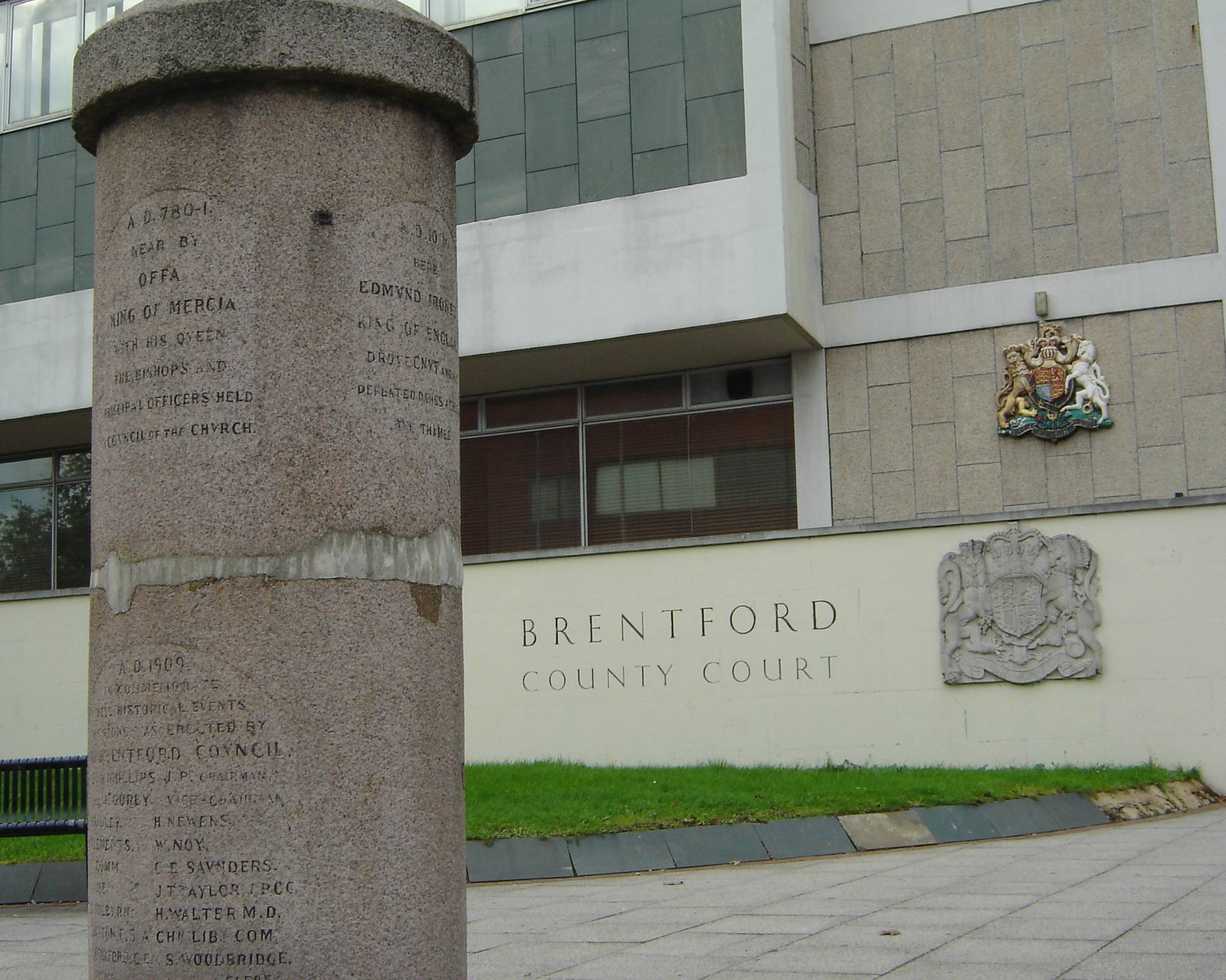
Monument outside Brentford County Court commemorating four major events in the town's history

In 1909 a monument was made out of two stone pillars that used to support lamps on the old Brentford bridge over the Grand Union Canal. The monument originally stood at the end of Ferry Lane; after being covered in coal unloaded from boats, it was moved further up the lane in 1955. In 1992 it was moved again to its present site at the junction of Brentford High Street and Alexandra Road, outside the County Court.

The monument commemorates four major events in Brentford's history: the supposed crossing of the Thames by Julius Caesar in 54 BC; the Council of Brentford by King Offa of Mercia in 781; the defeat of King Canute by King Edmund Ironside at the first Battle of Brentford in 1016; and the second Battle of Brentford in 1642.

=== Saint Paul's Church ===
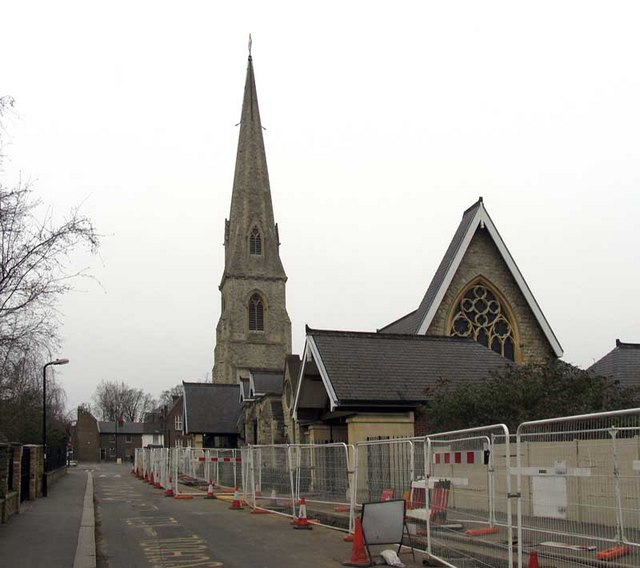
Saint Paul's Church

Built in 1868 from Kentish ragstone, Saint Paul's Church is one of Brentford's two current Anglican parish churches, and a distinct landmark. Its spire is clearly visible. The architect was H. Francis and James Montgomrey was a principal subscriber and chairman of the building committee. In 1959 and 1961 the parishes of the nearby churches of Saint George and Saint Lawrence were amalgamated with Saint Paul.

Inside the church is a painting by local artist Johann Zoffany called Christ's Last Supper. It was originally intended to be installed in St Anne's Church, Kew, but the local people objected, and therefore in 1887 it was installed in Saint George's Church instead. When that church was closed in 1959, the painting was transferred to its present location in Saint Paul's Church.

=== Saint Faith's Church ===
Brentford's other Anglican parish church, Saint Faith's, is a comparatively recent building, dating from 1906 to 1907. Designed in Gothic Revival style, by G F Bodley and D G Hare, it was described by the poet John Betjeman:

St Faith's displays all the splendour of Bodley in its simplicity and strength. It rises like a great ship over the housetops and inside the view from the west end leads you naturally to the altar and up to the roof.

=== Saint Lawrence's Church ===
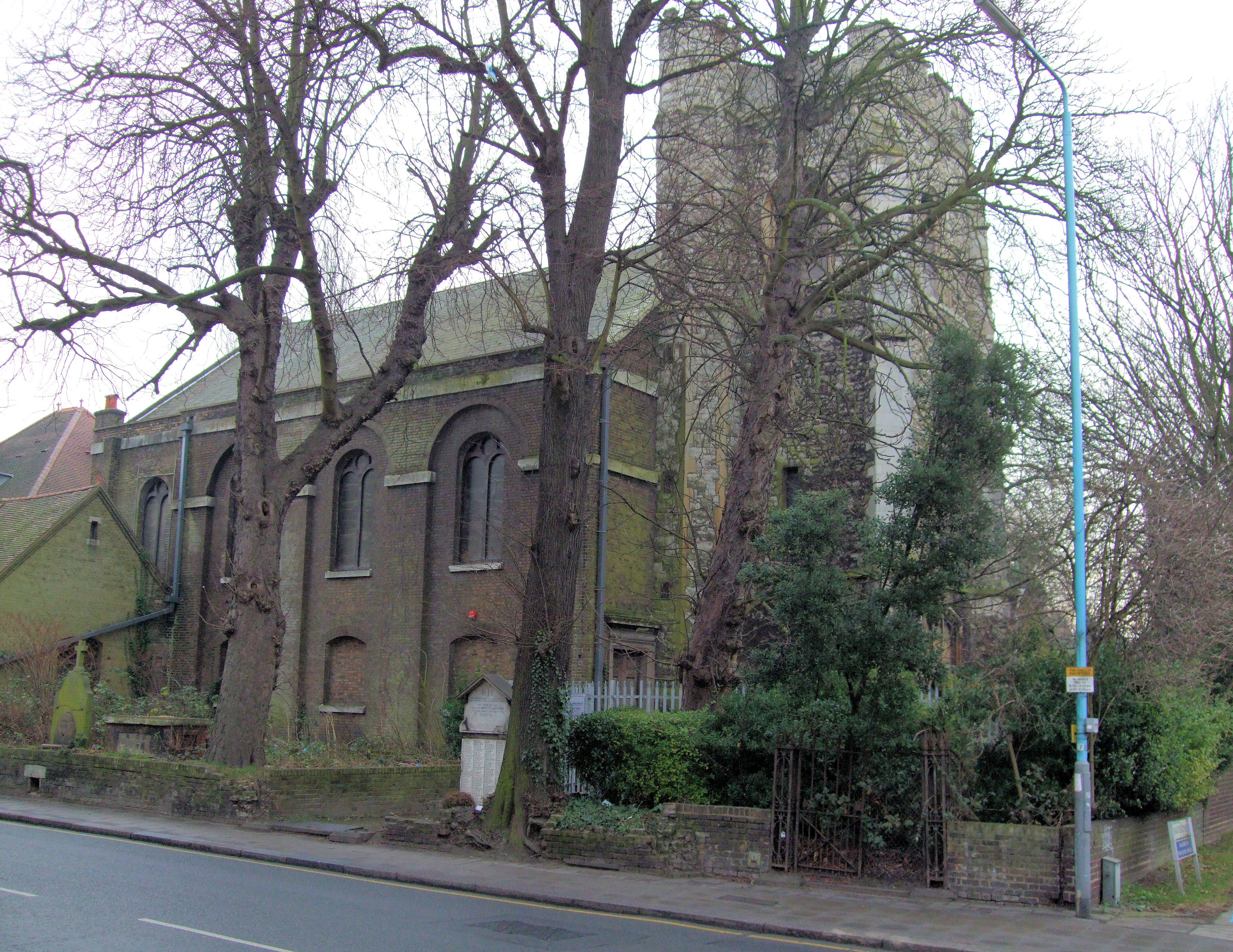
The derelict St Lawrence's church

There has been a church on the site of Brentford's former parish church of Saint Lawrence since the 12th century, but the tower dates from the 15th century, and the remainder of the church was rebuilt in 1764 from brick. There were a number of interesting monuments in the church, including one dedicated to a Maurice de Berkeley, dating from 1189, who was buried in the original church. The church was closed in 1961 and the monuments removed, and the parish was united with Saint Paul's. The church has now been in a derelict state for more than half a century but the landscaped former graveyard still holds the Ronalds vault where Hugh Ronalds and numerous members of his family are buried. A war memorial stood outside the church until 2009, when it was moved to Brentford Library.

=== Saint John the Evangelist's Church ===
St John the Evangelist Church, opened in 1866, was built for Irish railway construction workers, by an architect named Jackman.

=== Saint George's Church ===
An unconsecrated chapel was built from subscriptions raised from 57 prominent inhabitants on the site in 1762; previously the parish was part of Ealing. The old chapel was demolished in 1886 and eventually replaced by the current building designed by A. W. Blomfield. The painting of the Last Supper by Zoffany was transferred to the new church. It was closed in 1959 and used as the home for the Musical Museum from 1963 until the Museum moved to new premises. It is now (2017) being converted into flats.

=== On the periphery ===
Gunnersbury Park Museum is in Gunnersbury House, narrowly in Gunnersbury (the north-west of Chiswick) containing artefacts and former furnishings of the Rothschild family, who were culturally and financially pre-eminent across France, Germany, the Netherlands, the United Kingdom and North America.

Kew Gardens is visible from the scattering of high rise buildings towering over the town and some of the mid rise ones.

The Weir public house, formerly 'The White Horse', was where the artist J. M. W. Turner lived for one year at the age of ten. He is regarded as having started his interest in painting while living there. Later he lived in Isleworth and Twickenham.

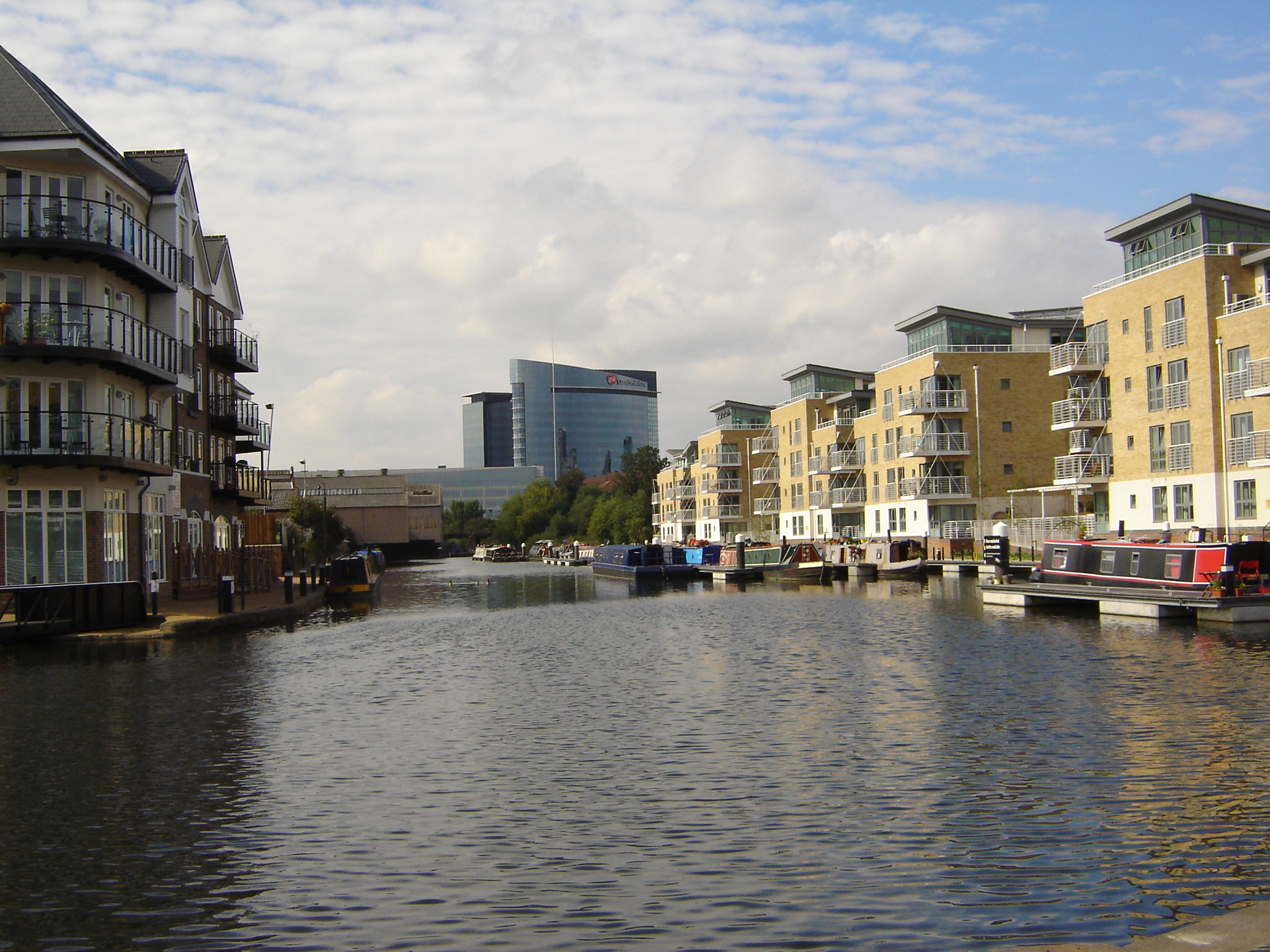
The Pool of Brentford Lock with new developments

=== Brentford Dock ===
Brentford Dock came to single use and engineered enlargement as a freight terminus of the Great Western Railway. It was designed by Isambard Kingdom Brunel and built between 1855 and 1859 at the confluence of the River Thames and River Brent – part of the land was James Montgomrey's Montgomrey's Wharf. A spur line from the GWR at Southall was constructed to the Brentford Dock railway station to facilitate easy transferral of freight from lighters and barges on the Thames to GWR-served destinations in the west of the country. The dock was redeveloped as residential accommodation from the early 1970s, and little industrial archaeology remains. However, Dock Road still retains some of its original fan pattern cobblestone road bed and examples of Brunel's broad-gauge 'bridge section' rail can be seen there.

The Brentford Dock flats (originally named the Tiber Estate) were built alongside formerly important transport infrastructure as Brentford is the terminus of the Grand Union Canal, originally the Grand Junction Canal. This waterway is still in use for leisure traffic as part of the Grand Union Canal.

=== Others ===
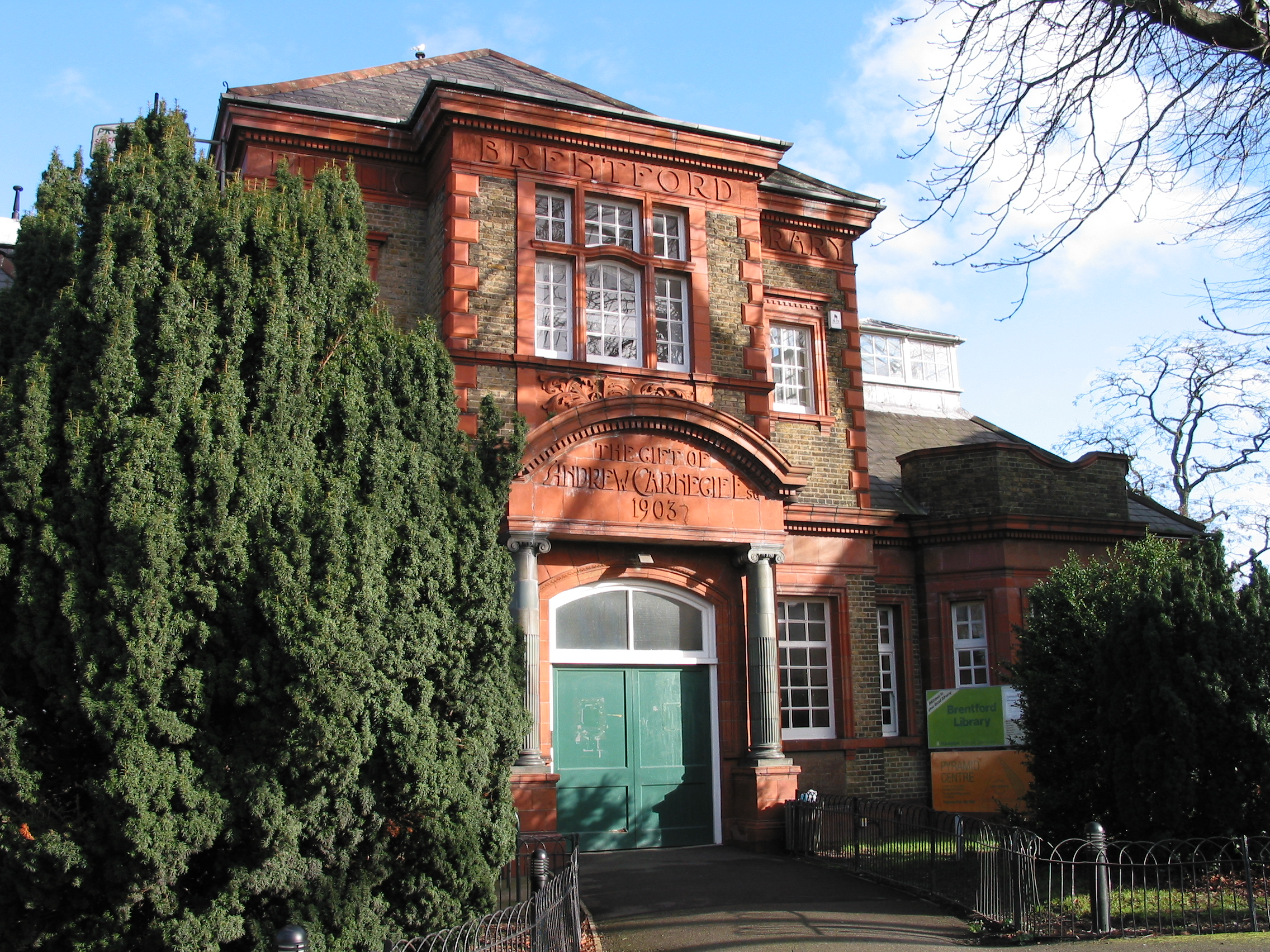
Brentford Public Library

Brentford Public Library is a Carnegie library, built by the architect Nowell Parr and opened in 1904. Outside the library is the Brentford War Memorial, accompanied by three smaller war memorials. There is also Jim Pooley's bench honouring Robert Rankin's writing connection with the borough.

Brentford Baths (1896), also by the architect Nowell Parr, is a Grade II listed example of late Victorian architecture.

The London Museum of Water & Steam houses the world's largest working beam engine, and its narrow cuboid tower is an emblem of the town.

The Musical Museum houses a large collection of mechanical musical instruments, such as player pianos and a Wurlitzer organ.

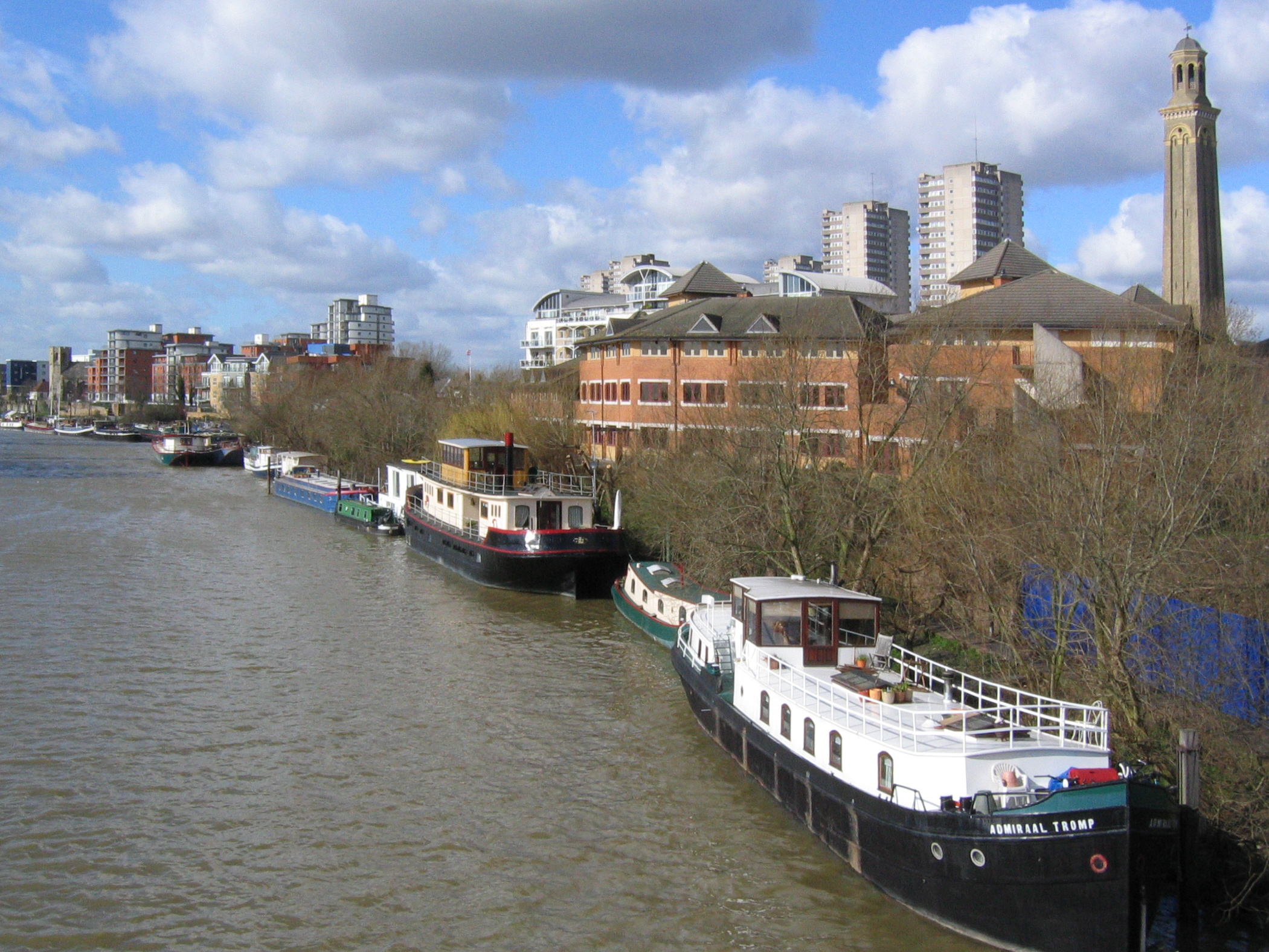
Houseboats on the Thames at Brentford, from Kew Bridge

The Butts Estate, a Georgian square and associated conservation area, contains several Grade II listed buildings some dating back to 1680. In the Butts is located St Mary's Convent, a grade II listed building from the late 18th century, now a convent and residential care home, Maryville Care Home.

== Sports ==
Brentford F.C. is a professional English football club, based in Brentford, and currently playing in the Premier League. The club was founded in 1889 by members of the defunct Brentford Rowing Club and plays its home games at the Gtech Community Stadium, having played at Griffin Park between 1904 and 2020. The club has a long-standing rivalry with near neighbours, Fulham and QPR. The Stadium was also used by the former Premiership Rugby side London Irish.

Griffin Park is also the former home of Chelsea Football Club Reserves. From 2002 until September 2005, it was the home of the London Broncos rugby league club – subsequently they were renamed Harlequins RL and transferred to The Stoop).

== Transport ==
Nearest London Underground stations:

- Northfields
- Boston Manor
- South Ealing
- Gunnersbury

Nearest railway stations:

- Brentford railway station
- Kew Bridge railway station
- Syon Lane railway station

== In literature ==
The phrase 'like two kings of Brentford' refers to former enemies who are now good friends. It appears in:

- the play The Rehearsal (1672), by George Villiers,
- the poem The Sofa by William Cowper
- the novel Tom Cringle's Log, by Michael Scott.

== In popular culture ==
Brentford's industrial status and the Great West Road are notable facets of Aldous Huxley's 1932 novel Brave New World. Set in London in AD 2540 (632 A.F.—"After Ford"), the influential dystopia anticipates changes in reproductive technology, sleep-learning, psychological manipulation, and classical conditioning that combine to change society profoundly.

The BBC Three sitcom People Just Do Nothing is set in and around Brentford.

The Brentford Trilogy, a (ten-book) series of "far-fetched fiction" novels by Robert Rankin, humorously chronicle the lives of a couple of drunken middle-aged layabouts, Jim Pooley and John Omally.

== See also ==
- List of people from Hounslow
- List of schools in Hounslow
