= List of United Kingdom locations: Bre-Bri =

The United Kingdom

This is part of the list of United Kingdom locations: a gazetteer of place names in the United Kingdom showing each place's locality and geographical coordinates.

== Br (continued) ==
=== Bre ===
Location	Locality	Coordinates (links to map & photo sources)	OS grid reference
Brea	Cornwall	50.21°N 05.28°W	SW6640
Breach	West Sussex	50.84°N 00.90°W	SU7706
Breach	Bath and North East Somerset	51.33°N 02.54°W	ST6260
Breach	Kent	51.35°N 00.64°E	TQ8465
Breachwood Green	Hertfordshire	51.88°N 00.33°W	TL1522
Breaclete	Western Isles	58.22°N 06.85°W	NB1536
Breaden Heath	Shropshire	52.91°N 02.83°W	SJ4436
Breadsall	City of Derby	52.94°N 01.45°W	SK3739
Breadsall Hilltop	City of Derby	52.93°N 01.46°W	SK3638
Breadstone	Gloucestershire	51.69°N 02.42°W	SO7100
Bread Street	Gloucestershire	51.75°N 02.24°W	SO8306
Breage	Cornwall	50.10°N 05.34°W	SW6128
Breaksea Point	The Vale Of Glamorgan	51.38°N 03.40°W	ST024660
Brealeys	Devon	50.91°N 04.07°W	SS5415
Bream	Gloucestershire	51.74°N 02.58°W	SO6005
Breamore	Hampshire	50.96°N 01.78°W	SU1518
Bream's Meend	Gloucestershire	51.74°N 02.59°W	SO5905
Brean	Somerset	51.29°N 03.01°W	ST2956
Brean Down	Somerset	51.32°N 03.02°W	ST289588
Brearley	Calderdale	53.73°N 01.97°W	SE0226
Brearton	North Yorkshire	54.03°N 01.51°W	SE3260
Breascleit	Western Isles	58.21°N 06.75°W	NB2135
Breaston	Derbyshire	52.89°N 01.31°W	SK4633
Brechfa	Carmarthenshire	51.94°N 04.15°W	SN5230
Brechin	Angus	56.73°N 02.65°W	NO6060
Breckles	Norfolk	52.50°N 00.87°E	TL9594
Breck of Cruan	Orkney Islands	59.04°N 03.09°W	HY3718
Breckrey	Highland	57.57°N 06.18°W	NG5062
Brecks	Rotherham	53.42°N 01.30°W	SK4692
Brecon	Powys	51.94°N 03.39°W	SO0428
Bredbury	Stockport	53.41°N 02.12°W	SJ9291
Bredbury Green	Stockport	53.40°N 02.10°W	SJ9390
Brede	East Sussex	50.93°N 00.58°E	TQ8218
Bredenbury	Herefordshire	52.20°N 02.58°W	SO6056
Bredfield	Suffolk	52.12°N 01.30°E	TM2652
Bredgar	Kent	51.30°N 00.69°E	TQ8860
Bredhurst	Kent	51.32°N 00.56°E	TQ7962
Bredon	Worcestershire	52.02°N 02.11°W	SO9236
Bredon's Hardwick	Worcestershire	52.01°N 02.13°W	SO9135
Bredon's Norton	Worcestershire	52.04°N 02.10°W	SO9339
Bredwardine	Herefordshire	52.09°N 02.97°W	SO3344
Breedon on the Hill	Leicestershire	52.79°N 01.40°W	SK4022
Breeds	Essex	51.78°N 00.43°E	TL6812
Breedy Butts	Lancashire	53.85°N 03.00°W	SD3440
Breich	West Lothian	55.82°N 03.66°W	NS9660
Breightmet	Bolton	53.57°N 02.39°W	SD7409
Breighton	East Riding of Yorkshire	53.79°N 00.92°W	SE7134
Breinton Common	Herefordshire	52.04°N 02.80°W	SO4539
Breivig	Western Isles	58.26°N 06.29°W	NB4839
Breiwick	Shetland Islands	60.20°N 01.18°W	HU4547
Brelston Green	Herefordshire	51.87°N 02.64°W	SO5620
Bremhill	Wiltshire	51.45°N 02.04°W	ST9773
Bremhill Wick	Wiltshire	51.46°N 02.05°W	ST9674
Bremilham	Wiltshire	51.57°N 02.14°W	ST902859
Bremirehoull	Shetland Islands	60.04°N 01.24°W	HU4229
Brenachie	Highland	57.75°N 04.08°W	NH7676
Brenchley	Kent	51.14°N 00.38°E	TQ6741
Brendon (near Lynton)	Devon	51.20°N 03.77°W	SS7647
Brendon (Thornbury)	Devon	50.83°N 04.33°W	SS3607
Brendon (Sutcombe)	Devon	50.89°N 04.34°W	SS3513
Brenish	Western Isles	58.12°N 07.11°W	NA9926
Brenkley	Newcastle upon Tyne	55.06°N 01.67°W	NZ2175
Brent	Cornwall	50.33°N 04.51°W	SX2151
Brent Eleigh	Suffolk	52.08°N 00.83°E	TL9447
Brentford	Hounslow	51.47°N 00.30°W	TQ1877
Brentford End	Hounslow	51.48°N 00.33°W	TQ1677
Brentingby	Leicestershire	52.75°N 00.84°W	SK7818
Brent Knoll	Somerset	51.24°N 02.96°W	ST3350
Brent Mill	Devon	50.41°N 03.84°W	SX6959
Brent Pelham	Hertfordshire	51.95°N 00.07°E	TL4330
Brentry	City of Bristol	51.50°N 02.62°W	ST5779
Brentwood	Essex	51.61°N 00.30°E	TQ6093
Brenzett	Kent	51.00°N 00.84°E	TR0027
Brenzett Green	Kent	51.01°N 00.86°E	TR0128
Brereton	Staffordshire	52.74°N 01.92°W	SK0516
Brereton Cross	Staffordshire	52.73°N 01.91°W	SK0615
Brereton Green	Cheshire	53.17°N 02.34°W	SJ7764
Brereton Heath	Cheshire	53.17°N 02.30°W	SJ8064
Breretonhill	Staffordshire	52.73°N 01.92°W	SK0515
Bressay	Shetland Islands	60.14°N 01.09°W	HU501404
Bressingham	Norfolk	52.37°N 01.04°E	TM0780
Bressingham Common	Norfolk	52.39°N 01.07°E	TM0982
Bretby	Derbyshire	52.80°N 01.57°W	SK2923
Bretford	Warwickshire	52.38°N 01.38°W	SP4277
Bretforton	Worcestershire	52.08°N 01.87°W	SP0943
Bretherton	Lancashire	53.67°N 02.80°W	SD4720
Brettabister	Shetland Islands	60.29°N 01.13°W	HU4857
Brettenham	Norfolk	52.41°N 00.83°E	TL9383
Brettenham	Suffolk	52.14°N 00.86°E	TL9653
Bretton	Derbyshire	53.28°N 01.70°W	SK2077
Bretton	Flintshire	53.16°N 02.97°W	SJ3563
Bretton	Cambridgeshire	52.58°N 00.28°W	TF1600
Brevig	Western Isles	56.95°N 07.44°W	NL6998
Brewer's End	Essex	51.86°N 00.25°E	TL5521
Brewers Green	Norfolk	52.37°N 01.08°E	TM1080
Brewer Street	Surrey	51.24°N 00.11°W	TQ3251
Brewlands Bridge	Angus	56.73°N 03.32°W	NO1961
Brewood	Staffordshire	52.66°N 02.17°W	SJ8808

=== Bri ===
Location	Locality	Coordinates (links to map & photo sources)	OS grid reference
Briantspuddle	Dorset	50.73°N 02.27°W	SY8193
Briar Hill	Northamptonshire	52.22°N 00.93°W	SP7359
Brick End	Essex	51.90°N 00.28°E	TL5725
Brickendon	Hertfordshire	51.74°N 00.08°W	TL3207
Bricket Wood	Hertfordshire	51.70°N 00.36°W	TL1302
Brickfields	Worcestershire	52.20°N 02.20°W	SO8656
Brickhill	Bedfordshire	52.15°N 00.46°W	TL0552
Brick Hill	Surrey	51.36°N 00.63°W	SU9564
Brick House End	Essex	51.93°N 00.12°E	TL4628
Brick Houses	Sheffield	53.32°N 01.55°W	SK3081
Brickhouses	Cheshire	53.15°N 02.34°W	SJ7762
Brick-kiln End	Nottinghamshire	53.09°N 01.13°W	SK5856
Brickkiln Green	Essex	51.95°N 00.51°E	TL7331
Bricklehampton	Worcestershire	52.07°N 02.03°W	SO9842
Bride	Isle of Man	54.38°N 04.40°W	NX4401
Bridekirk	Cumbria	54.68°N 03.38°W	NY1133
Bridestowe	Devon	50.68°N 04.11°W	SX5189
Brideswell	Aberdeenshire	57.44°N 02.71°W	NJ5739
Bridford	Devon	50.66°N 03.68°W	SX8186
Bridge	Dorset	50.84°N 02.91°W	ST3605
Bridge (Portreath)	Cornwall	50.25°N 05.27°W	SW6744
Bridge (Constantine)	Cornwall	50.11°N 05.19°W	SW7229
Bridge	Kent	51.24°N 01.12°E	TR1854
Bridge Ball	Devon	51.19°N 03.80°W	SS7446
Bridge End	Bedfordshire	52.13°N 00.54°W	TL0050
Bridge End	Cumbria	54.82°N 02.98°W	NY3748
Bridge End (Newton Poppleford)	Devon	50.69°N 03.28°W	SY0989
Bridge End (Aveton Gifford)	Devon	50.29°N 03.84°W	SX6946
Bridge End	Durham	54.71°N 01.98°W	NZ0136
Bridge End	Essex	51.95°N 00.42°E	TL6731
Bridge End	Flintshire	53.10°N 03.03°W	SJ3157
Bridge End	Herefordshire	52.11°N 02.55°W	SO6246
Bridge End	Lincolnshire	52.90°N 00.30°W	TF1436
Bridge End (Sandhoe, northeast of Hexham)	Northumberland	54.97°N 02.09°W	NY9464
Bridge End (near Warden)	Northumberland	54.98°N 02.14°W	NY9166
Bridge End	Oxfordshire	51.63°N 01.17°W	SU5793
Bridge End	Shetland Islands	60.08°N 01.33°W	HU3733
Bridge End	Surrey	51.30°N 00.46°W	TQ0757
Bridge End	Warwickshire	52.27°N 01.59°W	SP2864
Bridge End	Worcestershire	51.97°N 02.29°W	SO8031
Bridgefield	City of Aberdeen	57.19°N 02.16°W	NJ9012
Bridgefoot	Cumbria	54.64°N 03.47°W	NY0529
Bridgefoot	Angus	56.50°N 03.02°W	NO3735
Bridge Green	Norfolk	52.40°N 01.14°E	TM1483
Bridge Green	Essex	52.00°N 00.12°E	TL4636
Bridgehampton	Somerset	51.01°N 02.62°W	ST5624
Bridge Hewick	North Yorkshire	54.12°N 01.49°W	SE3370
Bridgehill	Durham	54.85°N 01.86°W	NZ0951
Bridgeholm Green	Derbyshire	53.32°N 01.94°W	SK0481
Bridgehouse Gate	North Yorkshire	54.08°N 01.77°W	SE1565
Bridgelands	Scottish Borders	55.56°N 02.82°W	NT4830
Bridgemarsh Island	Essex	51.63°N 00.74°E	TQ897968
Bridgemary	Hampshire	50.82°N 01.17°W	SU5803
Bridgemere	Cheshire	53.00°N 02.43°W	SJ7145
Bridgemont	Derbyshire	53.33°N 01.98°W	SK0182
Bridgen	Bexley	51.446°N 00.131°E	TQ481741
Bridgend	Devon	50.31°N 04.03°W	SX5548
Bridgend	Cornwall	50.40°N 04.67°W	SX1059
Bridgend	Ceredigion	52.07°N 04.67°W	SN1745
Bridgend	Gloucestershire	51.73°N 02.29°W	SO8004
Bridgend (Pen-y-bont Ar Ogwr)	Bridgend County Borough	51.50°N 03.58°W	SS9080
Bridgend	Cumbria	54.51°N 02.94°W	NY3914
Bridgend (Kintyre)	Argyll and Bute	55.57°N 05.50°W	NR7937
Bridgend (Islay)	Argyll and Bute	55.77°N 06.25°W	NR3362
Bridgend (Edzell)	Angus	56.80°N 02.77°W	NO5368
Bridgend (Glamis)	Angus	56.61°N 03.02°W	NO3747
Bridgend	Inverclyde	55.93°N 04.73°W	NS2975
Bridgend	Fife	56.29°N 02.98°W	NO3912
Bridgend (Cairnbaan)	Argyll and Bute	56.07°N 05.45°W	NR8592
Bridgend	North Lanarkshire	55.90°N 04.11°W	NS6870
Bridgend	Aberdeenshire	57.40°N 02.81°W	NJ5135
Bridgend	West Lothian	55.95°N 03.53°W	NT0475
Bridgend of Lintrathen	Angus	56.67°N 03.17°W	NO2854
Bridgeness	Falkirk	56.01°N 03.58°W	NT0181
Bridge of Alford	Aberdeenshire	57.24°N 02.73°W	NJ5617
Bridge of Allan	Stirling	56.15°N 03.94°W	NS7997
Bridge of Awe	Argyll and Bute	56.41°N 05.19°W	NN0329
Bridge of Balgie	Perth and Kinross	56.58°N 04.33°W	NN5746
Bridge of Brown	Highland	57.26°N 03.46°W	NJ1220
Bridge of Cally	Perth and Kinross	56.64°N 03.40°W	NO1451
Bridge of Canny	Aberdeenshire	57.06°N 02.57°W	NO6597
Bridge of Craigisla	Angus	56.66°N 03.22°W	NO2553
Bridge of Dee	Dumfries and Galloway	54.91°N 03.98°W	NX7360
Bridge of Don	City of Aberdeen	57.17°N 02.10°W	NJ9409
Bridge of Dun	Angus	56.71°N 02.55°W	NO6658
Bridge of Earn	Perth and Kinross	56.34°N 03.40°W	NO1318
Bridge of Feugh	Aberdeenshire	57.03°N 02.49°W	NO7094
Bridge of Gairn	Aberdeenshire	57.06°N 03.07°W	NO3597
Bridge of Gaur	Perth and Kinross	56.67°N 04.44°W	NN5056
Bridge of Muchalls	Aberdeenshire	57.01°N 02.18°W	NO8991
Bridge of Orchy	Argyll and Bute	56.51°N 04.78°W	NN2939
Bridge of Tynet	Moray	57.63°N 03.04°W	NJ3861
Bridge of Walls	Shetland Islands	60.24°N 01.53°W	HU2651
Bridge of Weir	Renfrewshire	55.85°N 04.57°W	NS3965
Bridge Reeve	Devon	50.90°N 03.90°W	SS6613
Bridgerule	Devon	50.79°N 04.45°W	SS2702
Bridges	Cornwall	50.38°N 04.75°W	SX0457
Bridges	Shropshire	52.55°N 02.90°W	SO3996
Bridge Sollers	Herefordshire	52.07°N 02.86°W	SO4142
Bridge Street	Suffolk	52.10°N 00.72°E	TL8749
Bridgeton	City of Glasgow	55.84°N 04.22°W	NS6164
Bridgetown	Cornwall	50.67°N 04.35°W	SX3489
Bridgetown	Devon	50.42°N 03.67°W	SX8160
Bridgetown	Somerset	51.08°N 03.54°W	SS9233
Bridge Town	Warwickshire	52.18°N 01.70°W	SP2054
Bridge Trafford	Cheshire	53.235°N 02.825°W	SJ4571
Bridgeyate	South Gloucestershire	51.45°N 02.46°W	ST6873
Bridgham	Norfolk	52.42°N 00.86°E	TL9585
Bridgnorth	Shropshire	52.53°N 02.42°W	SO7193
Bridgtown	Staffordshire	52.67°N 02.03°W	SJ9808
Bridgwater	Somerset	51.12°N 03.00°W	ST3037
Bridlington	East Riding of Yorkshire	54.08°N 00.19°W	TA1867
Bridport	Dorset	50.72°N 02.76°W	SY4692
Bridstow	Herefordshire	51.91°N 02.61°W	SO5824
Brierfield	Lancashire	53.82°N 02.24°W	SD8436
Brierholme Carr	Doncaster	53.58°N 00.97°W	SE6810
Brierley	Herefordshire	52.19°N 02.74°W	SO4955
Brierley	Gloucestershire	51.83°N 02.55°W	SO6215
Brierley	Barnsley	53.58°N 01.38°W	SE4110
Brierley Hill	Dudley	52.47°N 02.11°W	SO9286
Brierton	Hartlepool	54.66°N 01.27°W	NZ4730
Briery	Cumbria	54.60°N 03.11°W	NY2824
Briery Hill	Blaenau Gwent	51.76°N 03.21°W	SO1608
Briestfield	Kirklees	53.64°N 01.65°W	SE2317
Brigflatts	Cumbria	54.31°N 02.55°W	SD6491
Brigg	North Lincolnshire	53.55°N 00.49°W	TA0007
Briggate	Norfolk	52.79°N 01.42°E	TG3127
Briggswath	North Yorkshire	54.46°N 00.67°W	NZ8608
Brigham (Keswick)	Cumbria	54.59°N 03.13°W	NY2723
Brigham (near Cockermouth)	Cumbria	54.65°N 03.42°W	NY0830
Brigham	East Riding of Yorkshire	53.96°N 00.37°W	TA0753
Brighouse	Calderdale	53.70°N 01.78°W	SE1423
Brighstone	Isle of Wight	50.63°N 01.40°W	SZ4282
Brightgate	Derbyshire	53.12°N 01.61°W	SK2659
Brighthampton	Oxfordshire	51.72°N 01.45°W	SP3803
Brightholmlee	Sheffield	53.45°N 01.56°W	SK2995
Brightley	Devon	50.75°N 04.00°W	SX5997
Brightling	East Sussex	50.96°N 00.39°E	TQ6821
Brightlingsea	Essex	51.81°N 01.01°E	TM0817
Brighton	Brighton and Hove	50.83°N 00.14°W	TQ3106
Brighton	Cornwall	50.34°N 04.95°W	SW9054
Brighton Hill	Hampshire	51.23°N 01.11°W	SU6249
Brighton le Sands	Sefton	53.48°N 03.05°W	SJ3099
Brightons	Falkirk	55.97°N 03.71°W	NS9377
Brightside	Sheffield	53.39°N 01.44°W	SK3789
Brightwalton	Berkshire	51.50°N 01.39°W	SU4279
Brightwalton Green	Berkshire	51.49°N 01.39°W	SU4278
Brightwalton Holt	Berkshire	51.49°N 01.38°W	SU4377
Brightwell	Suffolk	52.04°N 01.26°E	TM2443
Brightwell Baldwin	Oxfordshire	51.65°N 01.06°W	SU6595
Brightwell-cum-Sotwell	Oxfordshire	51.60°N 01.16°W	SU5890
Brigmerston	Wiltshire	51.20°N 01.77°W	SU1645
Brignall	Durham	54.50°N 01.89°W	NZ0712
Brig o' Turk	Stirling	56.22°N 04.37°W	NN5306
Brigsley	North East Lincolnshire	53.49°N 00.11°W	TA2501
Brigsteer	Cumbria	54.29°N 02.80°W	SD4889
Brigstock	Northamptonshire	52.45°N 00.61°W	SP9485
Brill	Buckinghamshire	51.81°N 01.05°W	SP6513
Brill	Cornwall	50.11°N 05.19°W	SW7229
Brilley	Herefordshire	52.13°N 03.08°W	SO2649
Brilley Mountain	Powys	52.15°N 03.08°W	SO2651
Brimaston	Pembrokeshire	51.88°N 05.00°W	SM9325
Brimfield	Herefordshire	52.29°N 02.70°W	SO5267
Brimington	Derbyshire	53.25°N 01.40°W	SK4073
Brimington Common	Derbyshire	53.24°N 01.40°W	SK4072
Brimley (Hawkchurch)	Devon	50.79°N 02.95°W	ST3300
Brimley or Higher Brimley (Bovey Tracey)	Devon	50.58°N 03.71°W	SX7977
Brimpsfield	Gloucestershire	51.80°N 02.10°W	SO9312
Brimps Hill	Gloucestershire	51.85°N 02.48°W	SO6718
Brimpton	Berkshire	51.37°N 01.21°W	SU5564
Brimpton Common	Berkshire	51.36°N 01.19°W	SU5663
Brimscombe	Gloucestershire	51.71°N 02.18°W	SO8702
Brimsdown	Enfield	51.65°N 00.03°W	TQ3697
Brims Ness	Orkney Islands	58.78°N 03.23°W	ND286887
Brimstage	Wirral	53.33°N 03.05°W	SJ3082
Brincliffe	Sheffield	53.36°N 01.50°W	SK3385
Brind	East Riding of Yorkshire	53.77°N 00.87°W	SE7431
Brindham	Somerset	51.15°N 02.70°W	ST5140
Brindister (West Mainland)	Shetland Islands	60.29°N 01.49°W	HU2857
Brindister (South Mainland)	Shetland Islands	60.11°N 01.22°W	HU4337
Brindle	Lancashire	53.71°N 02.62°W	SD5924
Brindle Heath	Salford	53.49°N 02.30°W	SD8000
Brindley	Cheshire	53.07°N 02.61°W	SJ5953
Brindwoodgate	Derbyshire	53.28°N 01.50°W	SK3376
Brineton	Staffordshire	52.71°N 02.29°W	SJ8013
Bringewood Forge	Herefordshire	52.36°N 02.80°W	SO4574
Bringhurst	Leicestershire	52.51°N 00.76°W	SP8492
Bringsty Common	Herefordshire	52.19°N 02.44°W	SO7055
Brington	Cambridgeshire	52.36°N 00.41°W	TL0875
Brinian	Orkney Islands	59.12°N 02.99°W	HY4327
Briningham	Norfolk	52.86°N 01.01°E	TG0334
Brinkhill	Lincolnshire	53.23°N 00.05°E	TF3773
Brinkley	Cambridgeshire	52.16°N 00.36°E	TL6254
Brinkley	Nottinghamshire	53.06°N 00.94°W	SK7152
Brinkley Hill	Herefordshire	51.97°N 02.61°W	SO5831
Brinklow	Warwickshire	52.40°N 01.36°W	SP4379
Brinklow	Milton Keynes	52.02°N 00.68°W	SP9037
Brinkworth	Wiltshire	51.55°N 01.98°W	SU0184
Brinnington	Stockport	53.42°N 02.13°W	SJ9192
Brinscall	Lancashire	53.68°N 02.57°W	SD6221
Brinsea	North Somerset	51.35°N 02.80°W	ST4462
Brinsford	Staffordshire	52.64°N 02.13°W	SJ9105
Brinsley	Nottinghamshire	53.03°N 01.31°W	SK4649
Brinsop	Herefordshire	52.09°N 02.81°W	SO4444
Brinsop Common	Herefordshire	52.09°N 02.83°W	SO4344
Brinsworth	Sheffield	53.40°N 01.38°W	SK4190
Brinsworthy	Devon	51.05°N 03.78°W	SS7530
Brinton	Norfolk	52.87°N 01.01°E	TG0335
Brisco	Cumbria	54.85°N 02.90°W	NY4251
Briscoe	Cumbria	54.48°N 03.51°W	NY0211
Briscoerigg	North Yorkshire	53.94°N 01.62°W	SE2550
Brisley	Norfolk	52.75°N 00.88°E	TF9521
Brislington	City of Bristol	51.42°N 02.54°W	ST6270
Brissenden Green	Kent	51.11°N 00.75°E	TQ9339
Bristnall Fields	Dudley	52.47°N 02.01°W	SO9986
Bristol	City of Bristol	51.47°N 02.57°W	ST6075
Briston	Norfolk	52.84°N 01.05°E	TG0632
Britain Bottom	South Gloucestershire	51.57°N 02.31°W	ST7886
Britannia	Lancashire	53.68°N 02.18°W	SD8821
Britford	Wiltshire	51.05°N 01.77°W	SU1628
Brithdir	Ceredigion	52.09°N 04.42°W	SN3447
Brithdir	Caerphilly	51.70°N 03.23°W	SO1501
Brithdir	Gwynedd	52.74°N 03.83°W	SH7618
Brithem Bottom	Devon	50.88°N 03.40°W	ST0110
British	Torfaen	51.72°N 03.08°W	SO2503
Briton Ferry	Neath Port Talbot	51.63°N 03.83°W	SS7394
Britten's	Bath and North East Somerset	51.30°N 02.50°W	ST6556
Britwell	Berkshire	51.52°N 00.63°W	SU9582
Britwell Salome	Oxfordshire	51.63°N 01.03°W	SU6793
Brixham	Devon	50.38°N 03.52°W	SX9255
Brixton	Devon	50.35°N 04.03°W	SX5552
Brixton	Lambeth	51.45°N 00.11°W	TQ3175
Brixton Deverill	Wiltshire	51.14°N 02.20°W	ST8638
Brixworth	Northamptonshire	52.32°N 00.91°W	SP7470
Brize Norton	Oxfordshire	51.76°N 01.56°W	SP3007
