= Bridge End =

Bridge End may refer to:

- Bridge End, County Donegal, Republic of Ireland
- Bridge End, County Durham, England
- Bridge End, Lincolnshire, England
- Bridge End, Northumberland, England
- Bridge End, Shetland, Scotland
- Bridge End, Warwick, England
- Bridge End railway station, Belfast, Northern Ireland (renamed to Titanic Quarter since March 2012)
- Bridge End, a number of other locations, mostly in England

== See also ==
- Bridgend (disambiguation)
