= Brithdir =

Brithdir is the name of a number of locations in Wales:

== Villages ==
- Brithdir, Carmarthenshire
- Brithdir, Ceredigion
- Brithdir, Conwy
- Brithdir, Flintshire
- Brithdir, Gwynedd, noted for St Mark's Church, Brithdir
- Brithdir Mawr, Pembrokeshire
- Brithdir, Powys

== Districts of towns ==
- Brithdir, Caerphilly
- Brithdir, Bridgend
