= Brealey =

Brealey is a surname. Notable people with the surname include:

- Bruce Brealey (born 1959), British Army officer
- Gil Brealey (born 1932), Australian television and film director, producer and writer
- Louise Brealey (born 1979), English actress, writer and journalist
- Richard A. Brealey, British economist and author

See also may refer to:

- Brealeys is a village in Devon, England
- Nicholas Brealey, an imprint of British publisher John Murray
