= Brentford railway station (1860–1942) =

Former railway station in London, England

Coordinates: 51.4824°N 0.3136°W

Brentford
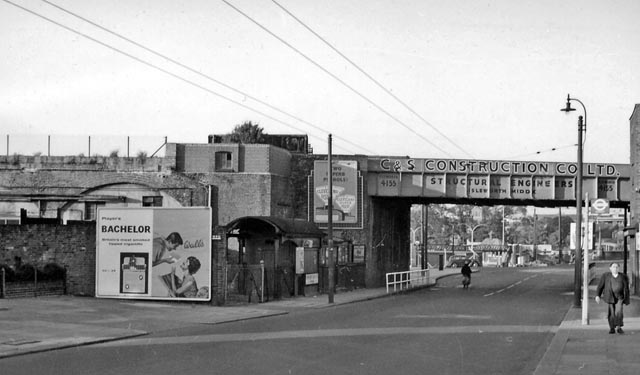
- Site of Brentford GWR Station in 1961

General information
- Location: Brentford, Hounslow; England
- Grid reference: TQ171772

Other information
- Status: Disused

History
- Original company: Great Western and Brentford Railway Company
- Pre-grouping: GWR
- Post-grouping: GWR

Key dates
- 1 May 1860: Opened
- 22 March 1915: Wartime economy closure
- 12 April 1920: Re-opened
- 4 May 1942: Closed
Location

Brentford railway station was a railway station in Brentford, England, from 1860 to 1942.

== History ==
Brentford railway station opened on 1 May 1860 on the Brentford Branch Line (the only line of the Great Western and Brentford Railway Company) which had opened in 1859 from Southall to Brentford Dock. It stood immediately north of Brentford High Street (the A315 road) on the embankment leading to the viaduct into the dock. The station closed on 22 March 1915 as a wartime economy measure, re-opened on 12 April 1920 and closed permanently on 4 May 1942. The station was demolished in 1957.

== Proposed reopening ==
In April 2017, it was proposed that the line could reopen to allow a new link from Southall to Hounslow and possibly down to the planned Old Oak Common station with a new station in Brentford called Brentford Golden Mile. The proposal suggested the service could be operated by Great Western Railway and could be open by 2020 with a new service from Southall to Brentford and possible later to Old Oak Common. It was likely that the site would be further up from the original and would have a later extension to the existing Brentford station.

== Notes ==
| Preceding station | Disused railways | Following station |
|---|---|---|
| Trumpers Crossing Halte | Great Western Railway; Brentford Branch Line | Terminus |
