= Bridgend (disambiguation) =

Bridgend is a town in Wales.

Bridgend may also refer to:

== England ==
- Bridgend, Cornwall
- Bridgend, Cumbria, a location
- Bridgend, Devon, a location
- Bridgend, Gloucestershire, a location

== Republic of Ireland ==
- Bridgend, County Donegal

== Scotland ==
- Bridgend, Aberdeenshire, a location
- Bridgend, Cairnbaan, Argyll and Bute, a location
- Bridgend, Edzell, Angus, a location
- Bridgend, Fife, a location
- Bridgend, Glamis, Angus, a location
- Bridgend, Inverclyde, a location
- Bridgend, Islay, a village in Argyll and Bute
- Bridgend, Kintyre, Argyll and Bute, a location
- Bridgend, Kirriemuir, Angus, a location
- Bridgend, North Lanarkshire, a location
- Bridgend, Perth and Kinross, a suburb of Perth
- Bridgend, West Lothian

== Wales ==
- Bridgend, a town in Wales
  - Bridgend (community), one of the three communities that make up the town of Bridgend
  - Bridgend (UK Parliament constituency)
  - Bridgend (Senedd constituency)
  - County Borough of Bridgend
- Bridgend, Ceredigion, a location

== Other ==
- Bridgend (film), a 2015 film

== See also ==
- Bridge End (disambiguation)
