= Brentford branch line =

Freight-only branch railway line in west London, England

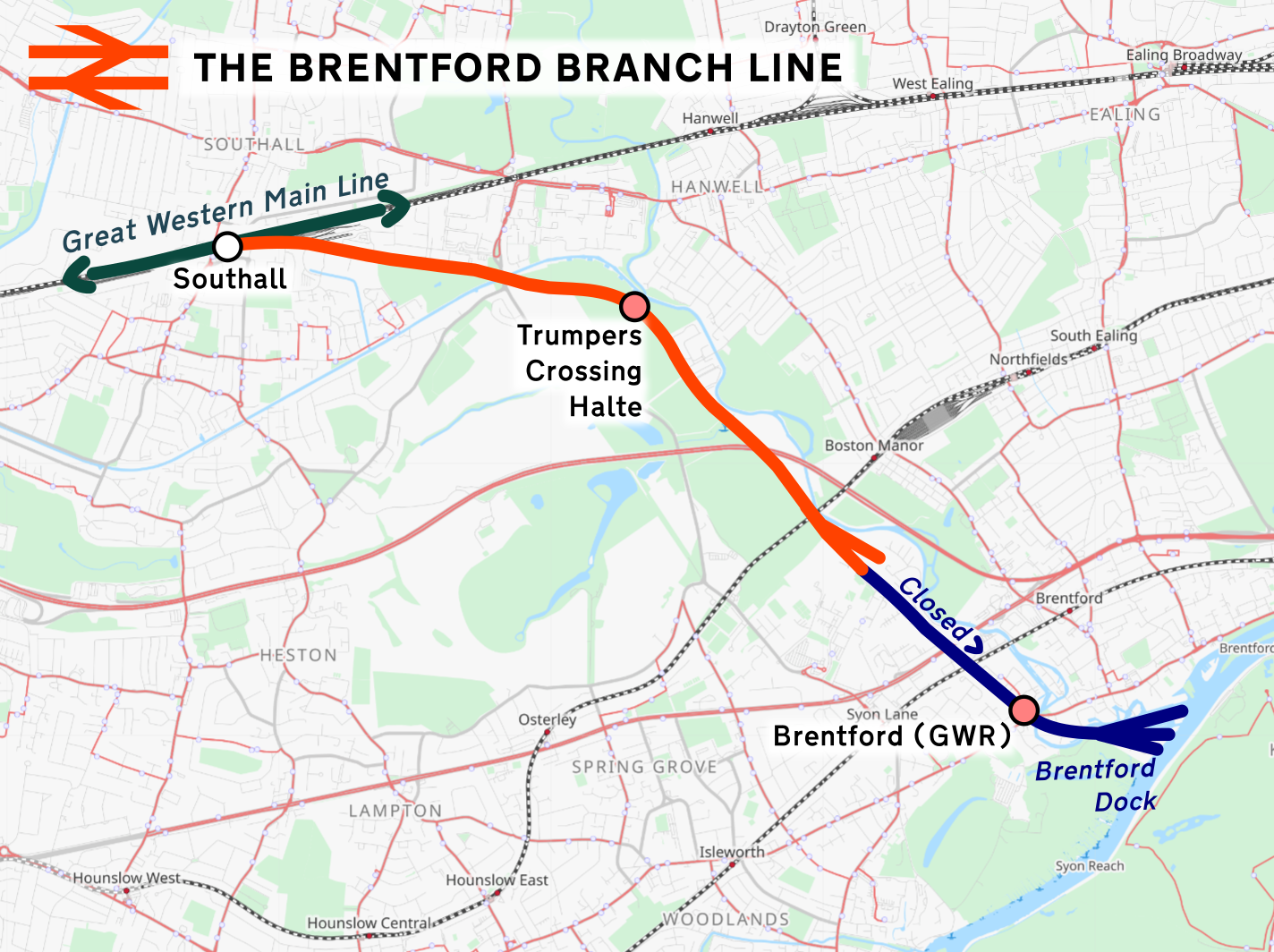
Route map (Click to enlarge)

The Brentford branch line, also known as the Brentford Dock Line, is a freight-only branch railway line in Greater London, England. The route, which opened in 1859, was backed by the Great Western Railway and built by the Great Western and Brentford Railway Company. It ran 4 mi (6.4 km) from Southall to Brentford Dock. In 1964, the line to the wharves was closed. The branch now runs from the Great Western Main Line to a goods yard and waste transfer station in Brentford.

== History ==
=== Early years ===
The line was proposed by the Great Western Railway (GWR) during the 1840s, as a means of reaching the inner London docks via the River Thames. Brentford was chosen as the most suitable location, being the point where the Great Western Main Line (GWML) is nearest to the Thames, and also the terminus of the Grand Junction Canal.

Great Western and Brentford Railway Act 1855
- Act of Parliament
- Parliament of the United Kingdom
- Long title: An Act for making a Railway from the Great Western Railway at Southall in the County of Middlesex to Brentford in the same County, with Docks at the last-mentioned Place; and for other Purposes.
- Citation: 18 & 19 Vict. c. cxci

Dates
- Royal assent: 14 August 1855

Text of statute as originally enacted

Great Western and Brentford Railway Amendment Act 1857
- Act of Parliament
- Parliament of the United Kingdom
- Long title: An Act to enable the Great Western and Brentford Railway Company to raise additional Capital; and for other Purposes.
- Citation: 20 & 21 Vict. c. xiii

Dates
- Royal assent: 26 June 1857

Despite opposition from the canal owners, the Great Western and Brentford Railway Company was incorporated on 14 August 1855 by an act of Parliament, the Great Western and Brentford Railway Act 1855 (18 & 19 Vict. c. cxci), promoted by the GWR. Construction of the line and dock at Brentford began on 3 March 1856, with Isambard Kingdom Brunel as chief engineer. The line was built from a down-facing connection with the GWML at Southall, to Brunel's 7 ft 1/4 in (2,140 mm) broad gauge. However, it took three years to complete due to the need to build a three-level bridge at Windmill Lane, Southall, where the line passed underneath both the road and the Grand Junction Canal. As Brunel underestimated the cost of building the dock, it was necessary to raise additional capital under two further acts of Parliament the Great Western and Brentford Railway Amendment Act 1857 (20 & 21 Vict. c. xiii) and the Great Western and Brentford Railway Leasing Act 1859 (22 Vict. c. xiii).

Brunel's famous 'Three Bridges' has the road cross above the Grand Junction Canal, with the railway in a cutting beneath the two. The Three Bridges bridge crossing is a unique transport intersection, and was to be Brunel's last project before he died on 15 September 1859 just two months after its completion. The correct name for it should be Windmill Bridge – named after the Southall Mill, which stood on the south-western side of the original canal bridge which was first built in the 1790s when the canal was cut. J. M. W. Turner painted this windmill in 1806. The Three Bridges has been designated a scheduled monument by English Heritage.

Great Western and Brentford Railway Leasing Act 1859
- Act of Parliament
- Parliament of the United Kingdom
- Long title: An Act for authorizing a Lease of the Great Western and Brentford Railway, and the Docks and Works connected therewith, to the Great Western Railway Company; and for other Purposes.
- Citation: 22 Vict. c. xiii

Dates
- Royal assent: 19 April 1859

The line and dock were officially opened on 15 July 1859, with freight services on the line commencing three days later. From the outset, these were worked by the GWR, to whom the line was leased under the Great Western and Brentford Railway Leasing Act 1859 (22 Vict. c. xiii). In February 1872, following a number of disputes, the Brentford company was amalgamated into the GWR.

A passenger service had also been projected during construction, and thus a separate platform at Southall station was set aside for this purpose. The service eventually commenced on 1 May 1860.

When built, the line consisted of a single track, which was carried into Brentford on a 240-yard viaduct, at the end of which a double track ran into the dock. However, ballast had been laid to allow doubling of the entire route, and in 1861 a standard gauge track added to the original broad gauge line. The new track was used by the freight services, while passenger trains continued to use the broad gauge track. Complete conversion of the line to standard gauge took place in 1875. The branch originally had its own single-road engine shed with a 40ft turntable, situated to the east of Southall station near the junction with the main line, but this was closed and demolished in June 1884.

=== Passenger service ===
When the passenger service commenced, trains ran between the dedicated platform at Southall and a station on what is now the A315 London Road in Brentford, with no intermediate stops. A second station was built at the dock for excursions connecting with the ferry across the Thames to Kew Gardens, but there is no record of it ever being used.

The GWR began operating railmotors on several routes in the London area in 1904, a half-hourly service between Southall and Brentford being introduced on 1 May. On 1 July of the same year, a halt was opened at Trumpers Crossing, one and a half miles from Southall.

From 1906, competition from electric trams brought about a decline in passenger numbers, and as an obvious target for wartime economy measures, the service was suspended on 22 March 1915. Around the start of June 1919, it was announced that the line would be closed permanently, but local pressure resulted in the reinstatement of weekday trains on 12 April 1920, and they ran briefly on Sundays during the summer of 1923. However, Trumpers Crossing Halte closed permanently on 1 February 1926, and in 1929 all passenger operations outside peak hours from Monday to Friday ceased, as did those after midday on Saturday.

Passenger numbers continued to fall during the interwar period as road transport grew increasingly popular, and the service was withdrawn in perpetuity on 4 May 1942. However, passengers returned to the line briefly on 24 August 1980, when the Great Western Railway Preservation Group ran special trains for the day.

=== After World War II ===
On 1 January 1948 the GWR, along with the other railway companies in Britain, was nationalised under the Transport Act 1947. The Brentford branch line, now freight-only, thus became part of the Western Region of British Railways. In 1956, the line was converted back to single track as far as the Firestone tyre factory on Brentford's Golden Mile.

Freight traffic on the line had risen during the 1930s due to the development of the Golden Mile and consequent opening, on 3 November 1930, of the Brentford Town Goods yard (enlarged in 1937). The increase continued to in the years immediately following World War II, until by 1951 there were as many as 25 goods trains a day. By the start of the 1960s, however, the factories served by the yard had begun to switch their freight to road transport, while at the same time the dock (which was claimed at one time to cater for as much as ten percent of the country's trade) was in decline as containerisation became popular in the shipping industry.

The dock finally closed on 31 December 1964, after which the line south of Brentford Town Goods was dismantled. Parts of the viaduct which carried the line into the dock remain intact, as does the embankment on which Brentford station stood.

Brentford Town Goods itself closed in December 1970. In 1977, a waste transfer station opened on the site of the yard, after the Greater London Council did a deal with British Rail to use the line for the transport of rubbish. As of 2013, there were four trains leaving the station each week.

The line is also currently used for the transport of construction aggregates, from a site just to the north of the waste transfer station.

== Proposed reopening ==
In April 2017, it was proposed that the line could reopen to allow a new link between Southall to Hounslow and possibly up to the planned Old Oak Common station with a new station in Brentford called Brentford Golden Mile. The proposals suggested that the service could be operated by Great Western Railway and it was stated that it could be open by 2020 with a new service from Southall to Hounslow and possible later to Old Oak Common. However, as of November 2023, it is yet to open.

This line has been identified by the Campaign for Better Transport as a candidate for reopening.

== Brentford 150 festival exhibition ==
This exhibition in June/July 2009 celebrated the 150th anniversary of the Brentford Dock branch line. It was held at the Musical Museum in Brentford and organized jointly by the Museum and the now-defunct Great Western Railway Preservation Group.

== Images ==
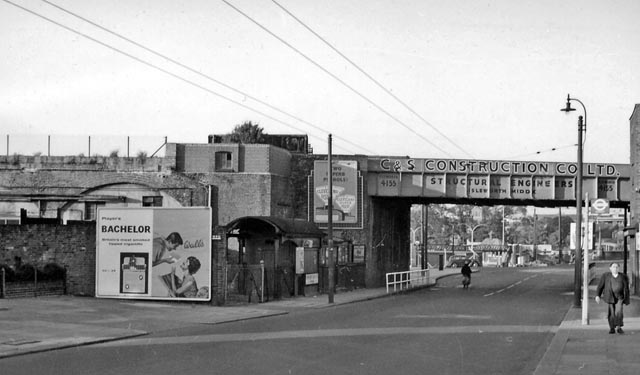
The Brentford station site in 1961, as viewed eastwards from the A315 London Road. The station closed in May 1942, and the platform buildings were demolished in 1957. The bridge over the road was removed in 1965 when the line south of Brentford Town Goods was dismantled.

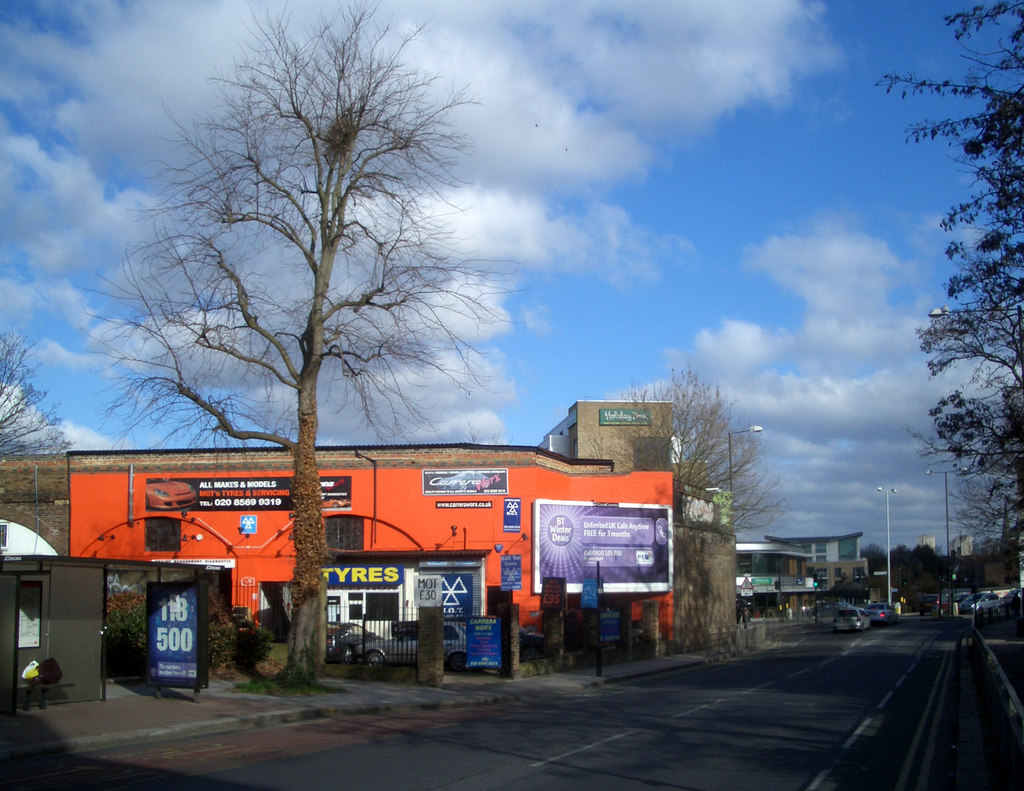
The same view in 2010, with part of the viaduct still intact and now occupied by a motor workshop.

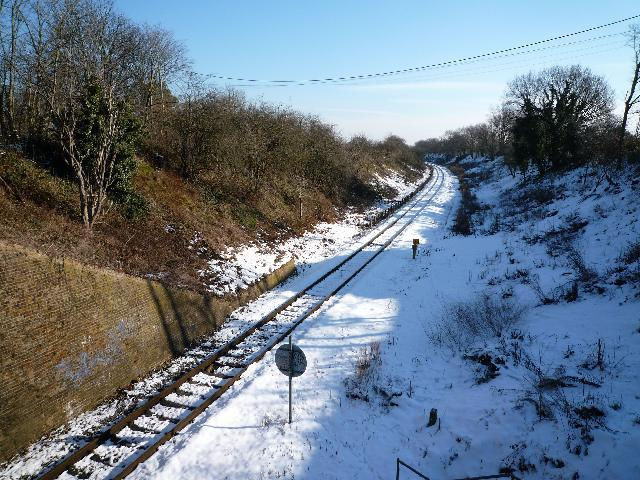
The Brentford Branch Line looking eastwards from the "Three Bridges".

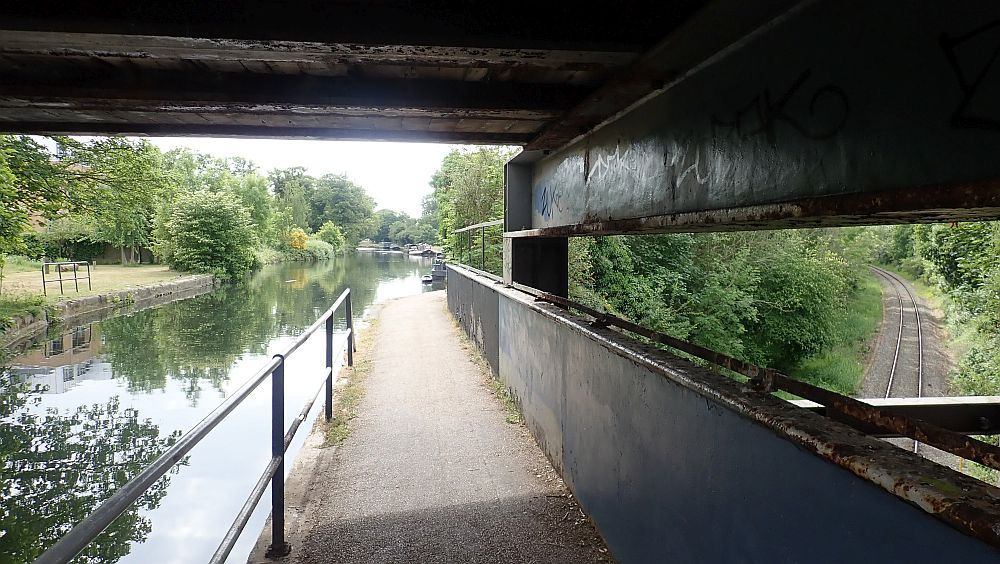
Looking westwards from the canal towpath at the "Three Bridges", showing the Brentford Branch Line in a cutting, and the underside of the road bridge above. Picture taken May 2025.

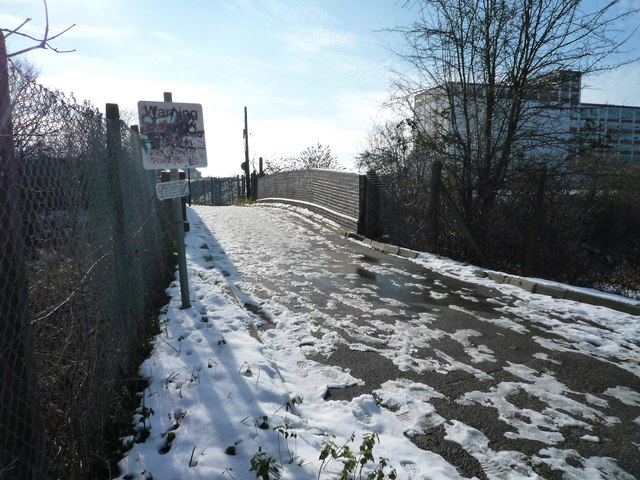
Footbridge over the Brentford Branch Line at Glade Lane, Southall.
