= GWR 517 Class =

Class of 156 British 0-4-2T locomotives

GWR 517 class
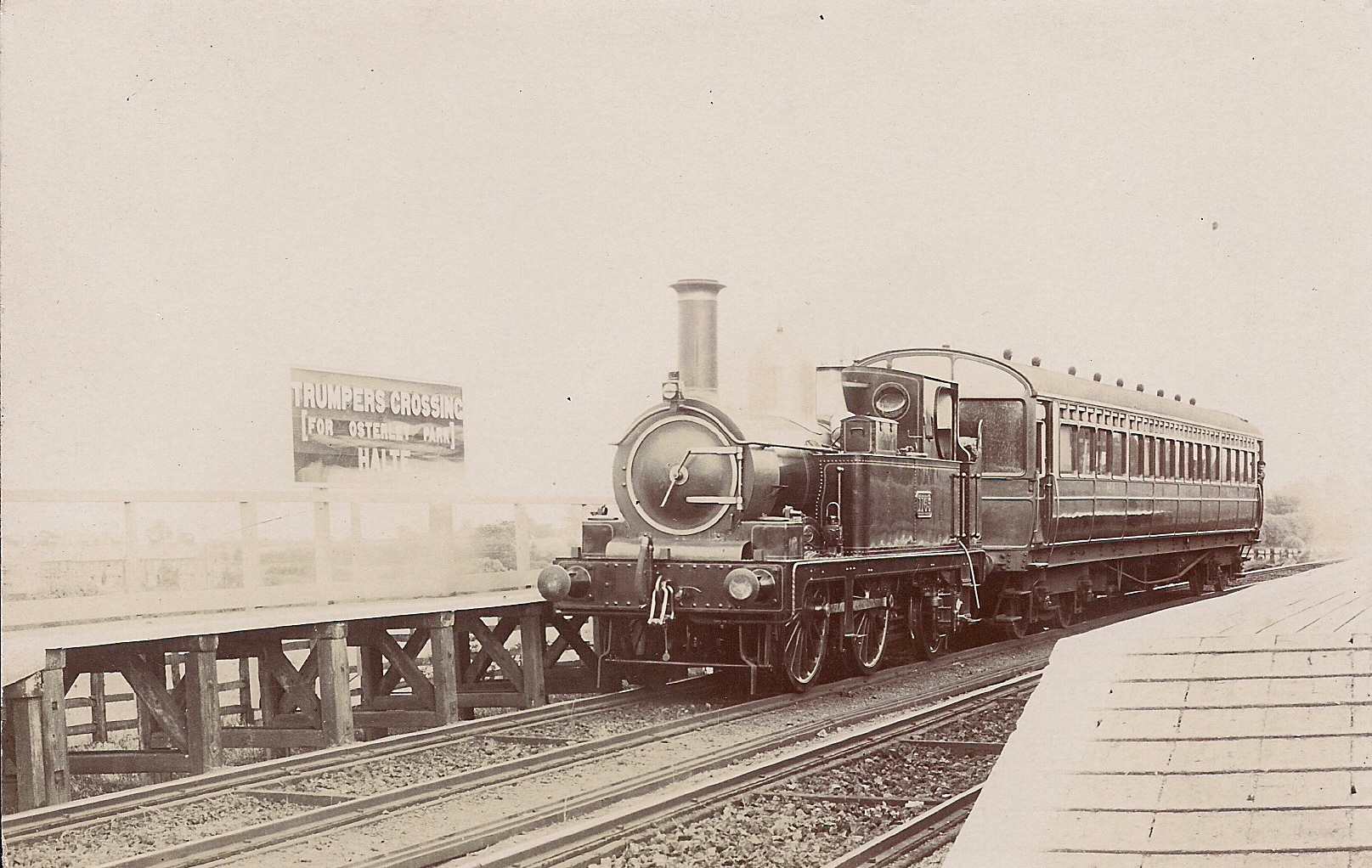
- 1165 at Trumpers Crossing Halte station
Type and origin
- Power type: Steam
- Designer: George Armstrong
- Builder: GWR Wolverhampton Works
- Order number: Lots D, E, F, G, H, I, R, S, W, Z, C2, M2, P2
- Build date: 1868–1885
- Total produced: 156
Specifications
- Configuration
  - Whyte: 0-4-2T
  - UIC: B1 n2t
- Gauge: 4 ft 8 1/2 in (1,435 mm) standard gauge
- Driver dia.: 5 ft 0 in (1.524 m) or 5 ft 2 in (1.575 m)
- Trailing dia.: 3 ft 8 in (1.118 m)
- Wheelbase: 15 ft 6 in (4.72 m)
- Length: 28 ft 4 5/8 in (8.65 m)
- Width: 8 ft 2 in (2.49 m)
- Height: 12 ft 1 5/8 in (3.70 m)
- Axle load: 12 long tons 16 cwt (28,700 lb or 13 t); 13.0 t; 14.3 short tons full
- Adhesive weight: 24 long tons 16 cwt (55,600 lb or 25.2 t); 25.2 t; 27.8 short tons full
- Loco weight: 35 long tons 4 cwt (78,800 lb or 35.8 t); 35.8 t; 39.4 short tons full
- Fuel type: Coal
- Water cap.: 620 imp gal (2,800 L; 740 US gal)
- Firebox
  - Grate area: 12.83 sq ft (1.192 m^{2})
- Boiler: GWR 517; GWR 2021
- Boiler pressure: 150 psi (10.34 bar; 1.03 MPa) or 165 psi (1.14 MPa)
- Heating surface
  - Firebox: 83.14 sq ft (7.724 m^{2})
  - Tubes: 904.47 sq ft (84.028 m^{2})
- Superheater: None
- Cylinders: Two, inside
- Cylinder size: 15 in × 24 in (381 mm × 610 mm), later 16 in × 24 in (406 mm × 610 mm)
- Valve gear: Stephenson
- Valve type: Slide valves
Performance figures
- Tractive effort: 12,635–14,780 lbf (56.20–65.74 kN)
Career
- Operators: Great Western Railway
- Class: 517
- Power class: Unclassified
- Axle load class: Unclassified
- Withdrawn: 1904–1945
- Disposition: All scrapped

The 517 Class were small 0-4-2T tank engines designed by George Armstrong for local passenger work on the Great Western Railway. They were built at Wolverhampton Works and were outshopped between 1868 and 1885. A total of 156 locomotives were built in thirteen lots, to various designs, commencing with 517–528 and ending with 1477–1488 in 1884–1885.

== Dimensions ==
The class was far from uniform and encompassed three different wheelbases, saddle and side tanks, and various boilers to name just a few variations. Driving wheels were 5 ft 0 in (1.524 m) (later 5 ft 2 in or 1.575 m due to thicker tyres), cylinders 15 in × 24 in (381 mm × 610 mm), (later 16 in × 24 in or 406 mm × 610 mm) and boiler pressure 150 psi (1.03 MPa) (later 165 psi or 1.14 MPa).

== Summary table ==
Table of GWR 517 class orders
Year	Lot	Quantity	GWR No.	Wheelbase	Trailing axleboxes	Tanks
1868	D	6	517–522	13 ft 7 in (4.14 m)	Inside	Saddle
1868	D	6	523–528	13 ft 8 in (4.17 m)	Inside	Saddle
1868–69	E	12	529–540	13 ft 8 in (4.17 m)	Inside	Saddle
1869	F	12	541–552	13 ft 8 in (4.17 m)	Inside	Saddle
1869	G	12	553–564	14 ft 8 in (4.47 m)	Inside	Saddle
1869–70	H	6	565–570	14 ft 8 in (4.47 m)	Inside	Saddle
1870	H	6	571–576	14 ft 8 in (4.47 m)	Inside	Side
1873–74	R	12	826–837	15 ft 0 in (4.57 m)	Inside	Side
1874–75	S	12	838–849	15 ft 0 in (4.57 m)	Inside	Side
1875–76	W	12	1154–1165	15 ft 0 in (4.57 m)	Inside	Side
1876	Z	12	202–205, 215–222	15 ft 0 in (4.57 m)	Inside	Side
1877	I	12	1421–1432	15 ft 0 in (4.57 m)	Inside	Side
1877–78	C2	12	1433–1444	15 ft 0 in (4.57 m)	Inside	Side
1883	M2	12	1465–1476	15 ft 0 in (4.57 m)	Inside	Side
1884–85	P2	6	1477–1482	15 ft 0 in (4.57 m)	Inside	Side
1885	P2	6	1483–1488	15 ft 6 in (4.72 m)	Outside	Side

When new, the first sixty were numbered 1040–87 (Lots D to G inclusive) and 1100–11 (Lot H); they were renumbered 517–576 in July 1870.

== History ==
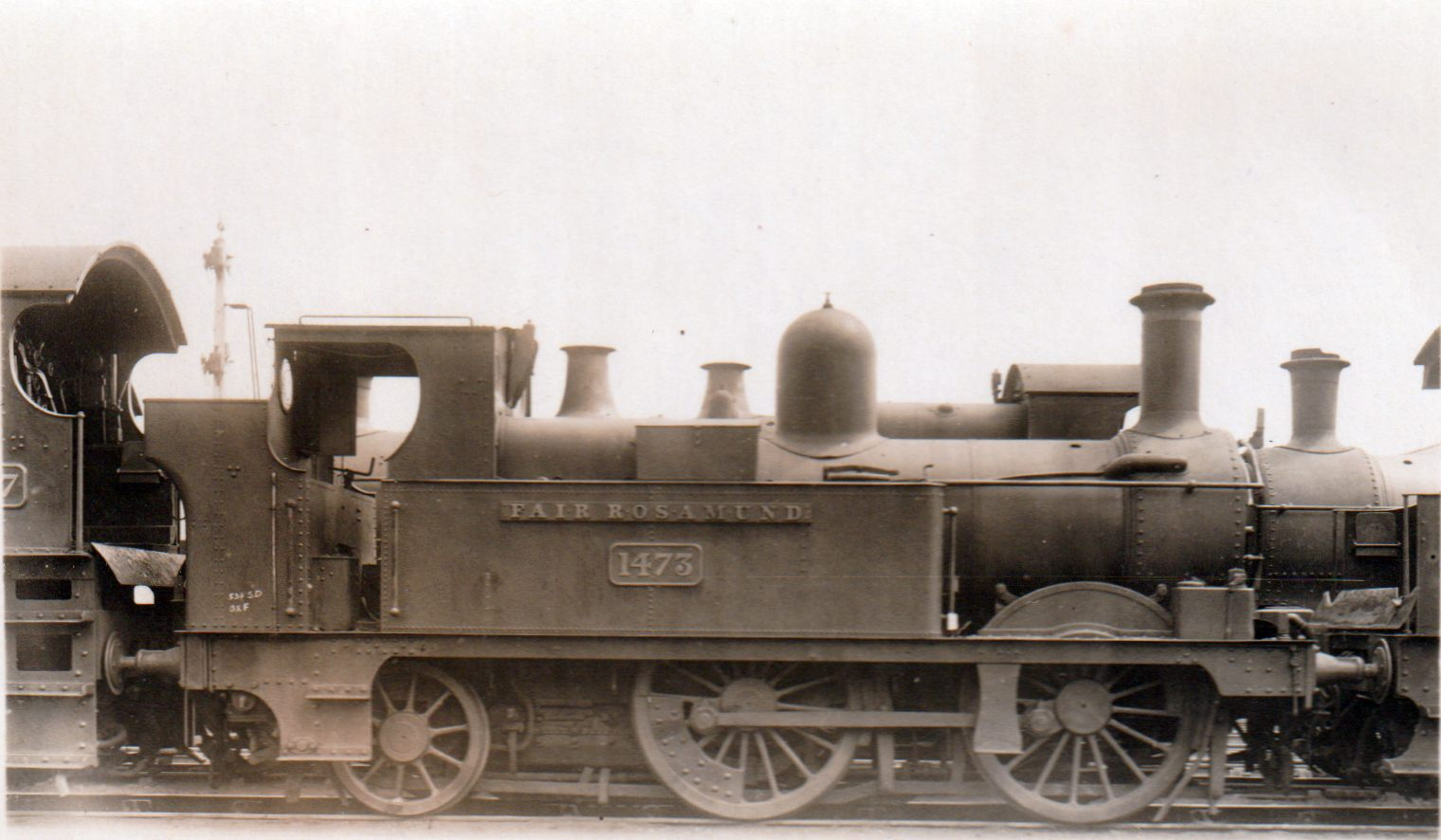
1473 Fair Rosamund

The earlier ones were rebuilt from saddle tanks while the later ones were built as side tanks from the beginning. The 3571 Class were very closely related, its prototype being a minor rebuild of 517 class No. 1477 in 1895. Then ten new locos followed in the next two years. Returning to the 517 class, various bunker and cab combinations also evolved, and after their last rebuilding, the locos with enclosed cabs and large bunkers were effectively the progenitors of Collett's 4800 class. In 1898, No. 1473 was named Fair Rosamund, to work a royal train on the Blenheim and Woodstock branch line. The locomotive was then regularly used for the Woodstock branch in subsequent years.

== The Armstrong brothers ==
The independence of the Armstrong brothers is symbolised by the fact that Joseph at Swindon preferred the 2-4-0T wheel arrangement (the 455 Class "Metro" Tanks) over 0-4-2T while George built none of the former at Wolverhampton.

== Use ==
In the 19th century, the 517s were principally Northern Division engines, and when new worked the Birmingham and Wolverhampton suburban traffic. Under Churchward the situation changed: about half of the class was fitted for autotrain working, and these engines were regularly maintained and moved around the system where needed; while the other, unconverted engines were demoted and became little more than shunters. Nevertheless as late as the 1920s the class was found in almost all parts of the GWR system. Most of the class ran between a million and a million and a half miles (2,400,000 km), No. 1163 holding the record at 1,652,661. None of the 517s were preserved, the last survivor No. 848 being scrapped in 1945 at the age of 70.

== Coachwork ==
When autotrains were introduced on the GWR, a trial was made of enclosing the engine in coachwork to resemble the coaches. Nos 533 and 833 of this class were so equipped in 1906, as were two 2021 class 0-6-0Ts. The experiment was unpopular with engine crews, and the bodywork was removed in 1911.

== Accidents and incidents ==
- On 15 April 1923, locomotive No. 215 was hauling Autocoach No. 70 when it was in a head-on collision with a goods train, hauled by GWR 4000 Class 4-6-0 No. 4048 Princess Victoria, at Curry Rivel, Somerset due to a signalman's error. Nine people were injured.
