= Southall railway station =

National Rail station in London, England

Southall
- Punjabi: ਸਾਊਥਹਾਲ
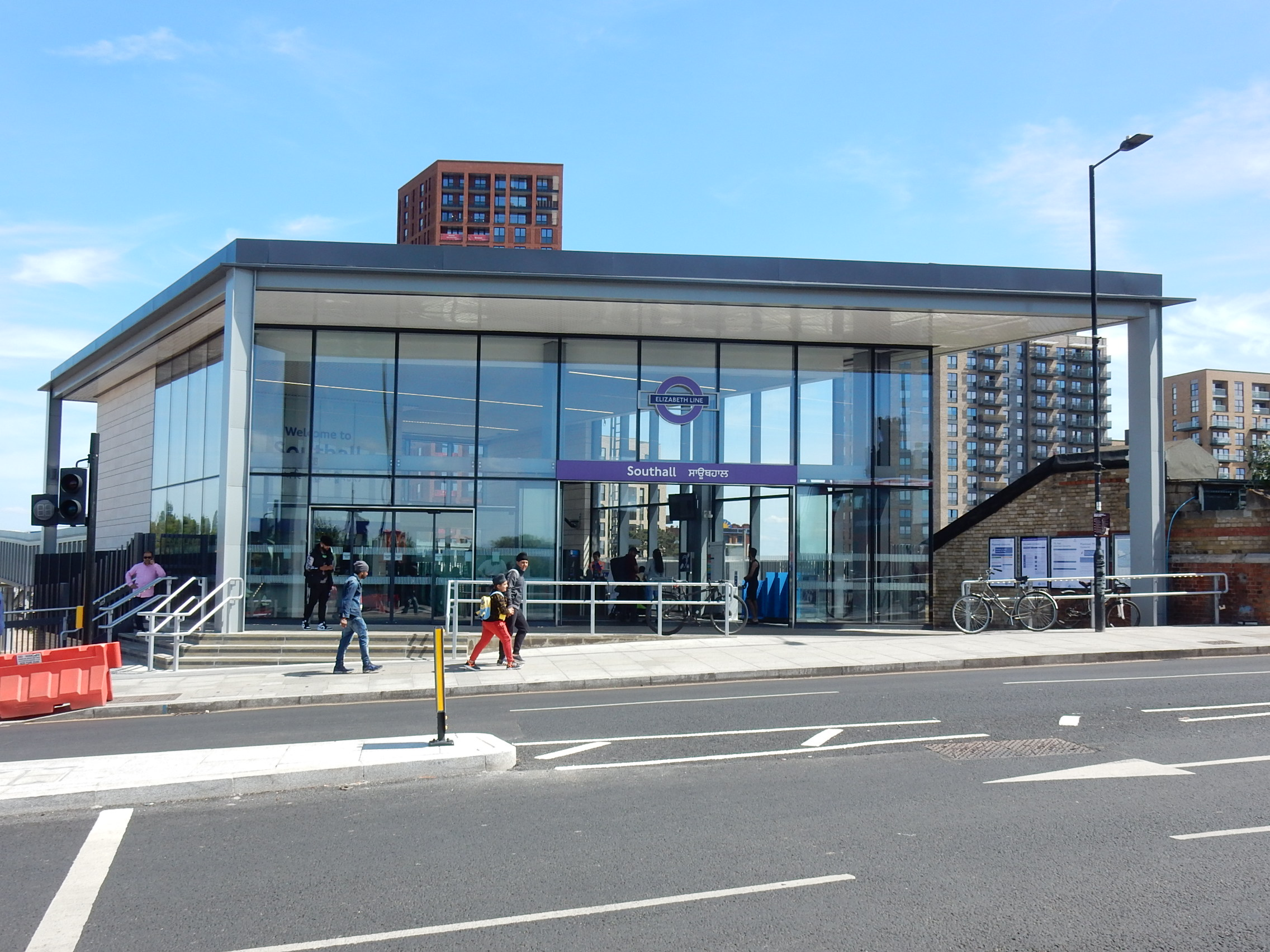
- Station entrance seen in May 2022
- Interactive map of Southall

General information
- Location: Southall
- Local authority: London Borough of Ealing
- Managed by: Elizabeth line
- Owner: Network Rail
- Station code: STL
- DfT category: D
- Number of platforms: 5
- Accessible: Yes
- Fare zone: 4

National Rail annual entry and exit
- 2020–21: ▼1.267 million
- 2021–22: ▲2.756 million
- 2022–23: ▲4.428 million
- 2023–24: ▲6.969 million
- 2024–25: ▲7.669 million

Key dates
- 1 May 1839: Opened

Other information
- External links: Departures; Facilities
- Coordinates: 51.506°N 0.3783°W

Southall is a step-free access railway station on the Great Western Main Line in Southall, London, England. It is in London fare zone 4 and passenger services are provided by the Elizabeth line from London Paddington. It is 9 miles 6 chains (14.6 km) down the line from Paddington and is situated between Hanwell to the east and Hayes & Harlington to the west. Most of the ridership from Southall originates and ends at Bond Street. Great Western Railway also operate late night services towards London Paddington and Reading. The station is renowned for its bilingual station signage in Punjabi.

The station is managed by the Elizabeth line, and was rebuilt with step-free access as part of the Crossrail project.

== History ==
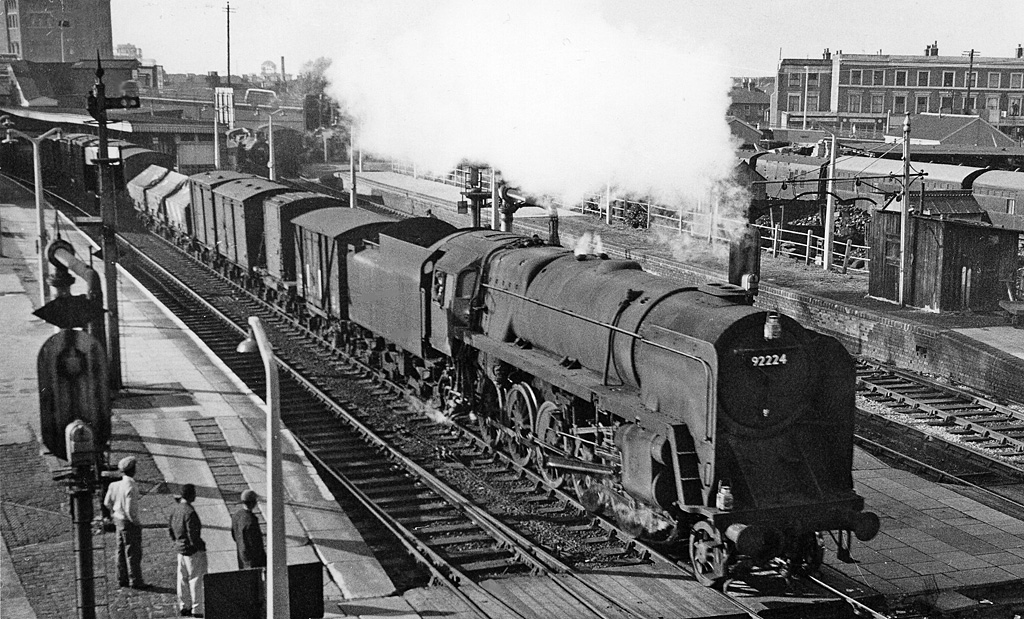
Up freight passing Southall Station in 1961

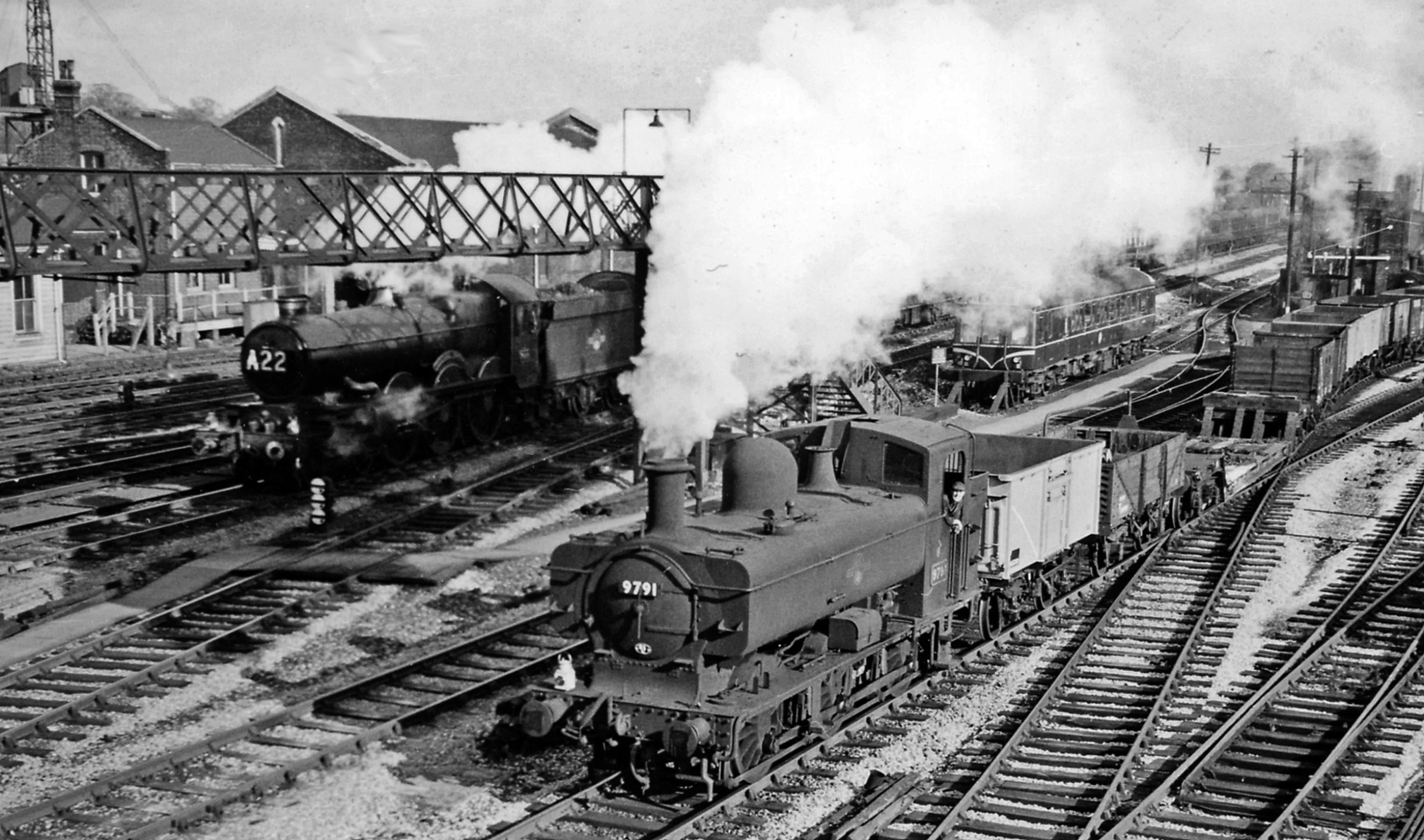
Goods train coming off the Brentford Dock branch in 1961

The Great Western Railway opened Southall railway station on 1 May 1839, nearly one year after it opened its first railway line on 4 June 1838, between London Paddington and Maidenhead Riverside (the latter now known as Taplow). The Brentford Branch Line to Brentford Dock was opened for freight in 1859; a passenger service ran on the branch from 1 May 1860 until 4 May 1942, using the unnumbered platform at the south of the station (the line serving this platform is now only used as a relief line). From 1 March 1883 to 30 September 1885 (when the service was discontinued as uneconomic) the District Railway ran trains between Mansion House and Windsor which called at the station. The goods platforms opened as part of the original station were closed and dismantled in 1967. The Great Western Main Line was electrified through Southall in the early 1990s as part of the Heathrow Express project.

=== Crossrail ===
Southall was first proposed to be part of the Crossrail project in the 1990s. In 2004, public consultation into the project proposed a new station building with step free access, as well as platform extensions to serve longer trains. The number of seats available into Central London would treble, due to longer and more frequent trains.

In March 2010, the Crossrail Specialist Scrutiny Panel recommended that Crossrail should give consideration to the proposed regeneration developments in the area, including the Southall Gas Works development and the landscaping of unused work sites.

In May 2011, Network Rail announced that it would deliver improvements and alterations to prepare the station for Crossrail services. The work would include platform extensions, a new ticket hall designed by Bennetts Associates with level access from South Road, and step-free access to all platforms. Outside the station, public realm improvements funded by Transport for London and Ealing Borough Council would include widened pavements, street trees and cycle parking.

In 2015, Ealing Council approved the proposed work at Southall, allowing initial construction work to commence. In 2017, it was announced that completion of the station was delayed until 2019. In 2019, contracts for the new station building was awarded, allowing construction of the new station building. Following delays due to the COVID-19 pandemic, the refurbished station opened on 26 August 2021, providing step free access to all platforms.

=== Accidents and incidents ===
On 19 September 1997, a Great Western Trains passenger train from Swansea to London Paddington failed to stop at a red signal and collided with a freight train, killing 7 people and injuring 139 others. The train driver, Larry Harrison, was charged with manslaughter, but the case against him was dropped. Great Western Trains was fined £1.5 million for the crash. Following this accident and the more serious Ladbroke Grove Rail Crash some miles east, First Great Western requires all its trains to have their ATP switched on at all times. If the equipment is faulty, the train is stored out of use.

=== Bilingual signage ===
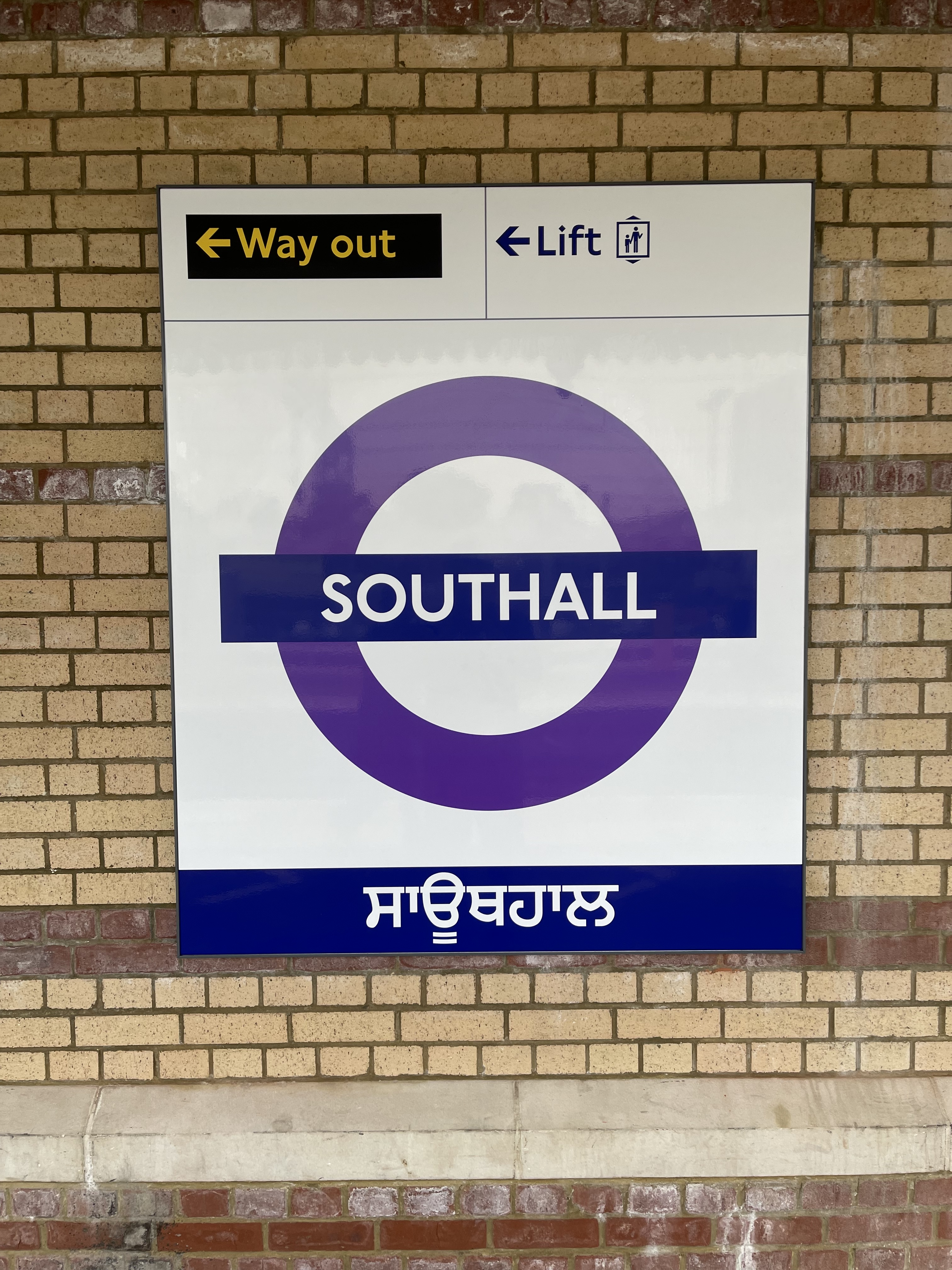
Southall station roundel, with ਸਾਊਥਹਾਲ in Gurmukhī

Southall station has bilingual station signage, owing to the large Punjabi community in the local area. Station signs on the platforms bear "Southall" and also "ਸਾਊਥਹਾਲ" in Gurmukhī, a script commonly used for the Punjabi language. In 2007, following issues raised by other ethnic groups in the area, First Great Western announced it would review the signage. The bilingual signs were kept, and were still displayed at the station. In 2021, the new station building and platform roundel maintained the use of bilingual signage. It is one of the relatively few stations in England to have bilingual signage, others being Whitechapel (Bengali), Wallsend (Latin), Hereford (Welsh), Moreton-in-Marsh (Japanese) and St Pancras International, Ebbsfleet International and Ashford International (French).

== Layout and facilities ==
Southall railway station has five platforms, one of which is unnumbered and used only for freight and special events. In normal circumstances, platforms 1 and 2, on the fast lines, and the unnumbered platform are not used by passengers; platforms 3 and 4 are used by all trains serving the station. The new station building has a ticket office and automatic ticket barriers. A footbridge gives access to platforms 3 and 4 via steps and lifts, while gates prevents access to the other three, under normal circumstances.

Oyster "pay as you go" has been available since October 2008 for journeys to or from Southall.

== Services ==
Trains at Southall are operated by the Elizabeth line.

=== Frequency ===
As of the May 2023 timetable, the typical Monday to Friday off-peak Elizabeth line service is:

- 4 tph (trains per hour) westbound to Heathrow Terminal 4
- 2 tph westbound to Reading
- 2 tph westbound to Maidenhead
- 8 tph eastbound to Abbey Wood

=== Service table ===
Preceding station	Elizabeth line	Following station
Hayes & Harlington towards Heathrow Terminal 4	Elizabeth line	Hanwell towards Abbey Wood
Hayes & Harlington towards Maidenhead or Reading	Elizabeth line	Ealing Broadway towards Abbey Wood
Preceding station	National Rail	Following station
Hayes and Harlington	Great Western Railway Great Western Mainline Late Night Services	Ealing Broadway
Preceding station	London Underground	Following station
Historical services
Hayes & Harlington Line and station open towards Windsor	District line	Hanwell Line and station open towards Mansion House
Preceding station	National Rail	Following station
Disused railways
Terminus	Great Western Railway; Brentford Branch Line	Trumpers Crossing Halte; Line and station closed

== Connections ==
London Buses routes 105, 120, 195, 427, 482, E5 and H32 serve the station.

== See also ==
- Southall Railway Centre–a heritage railway centre, based in part of the former Southall locomotive depot (visible from the station: to the south of the main line, looking towards Paddington). It is home to the GWR Preservation Group.
- Southall East Junction
