= Brentford End =

Coordinates: 51.482°N 0.320°W

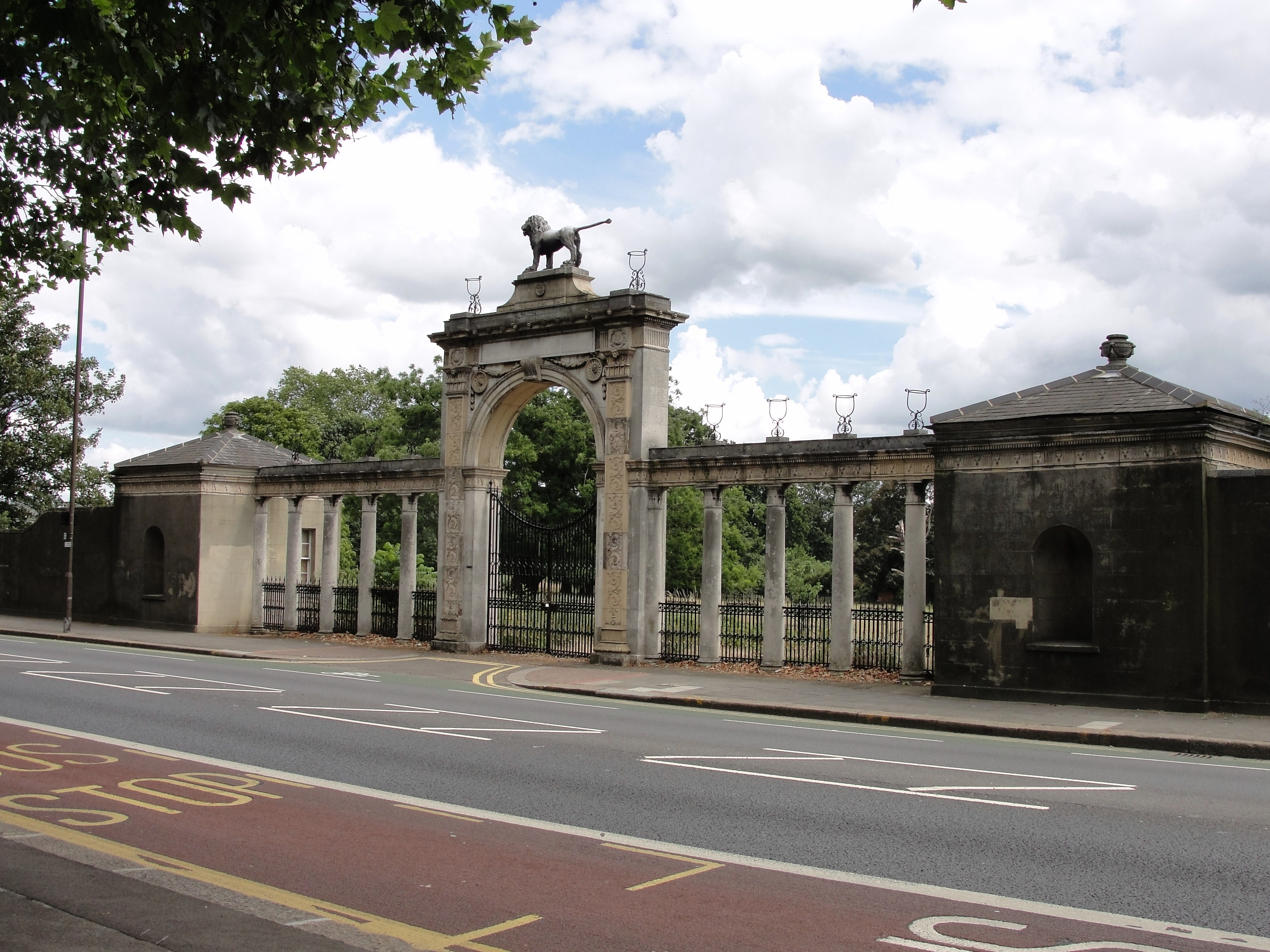
- Entrance to Syon Park on London Road

- Location within Greater London
- London borough: Hounslow
- Ceremonial county: Greater London
- Region: London
- Country: England
- Sovereign state: United Kingdom
- Post town: FELTHAM
- Postcode district: TW8
- Dialling code: 020
- Police: Metropolitan
- Fire: London
- Ambulance: London
- London Assembly: South West

Brentford End is a small area located in the borough of Hounslow, London to the west of Brentford and east of Isleworth. It is a little-used name for that section of Brentford situated to the west of the river Brent.

Until the creation of the London Borough or Hounslow it was in the Borough of Heston and Isleworth, in the Administrative County of Middlesex.

Syon Park and Syon House are located in Brentford End, and this area was also home to Pocahontas for part of her time in England, between 1616 and 1617. Brentford End also covers part of the Golden Mile section of the Great West Road. The Brentford Town GWR Station was formerly located in Brentford End.

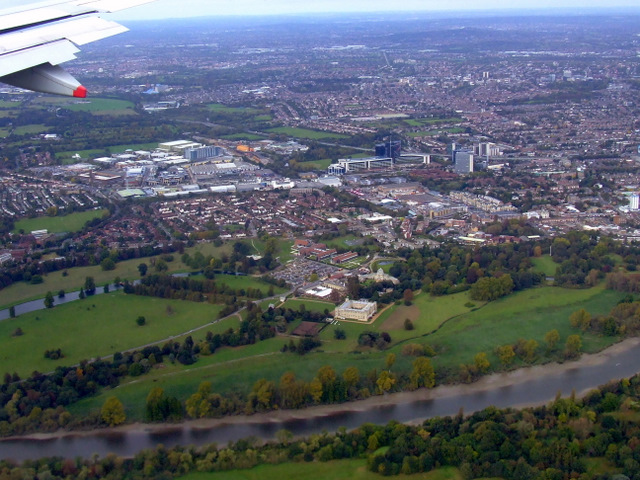
Brentford End from the air, with Syon Park in the foreground

Plaque commemorating Pocahontas, who lived opposite the grounds of Syon House

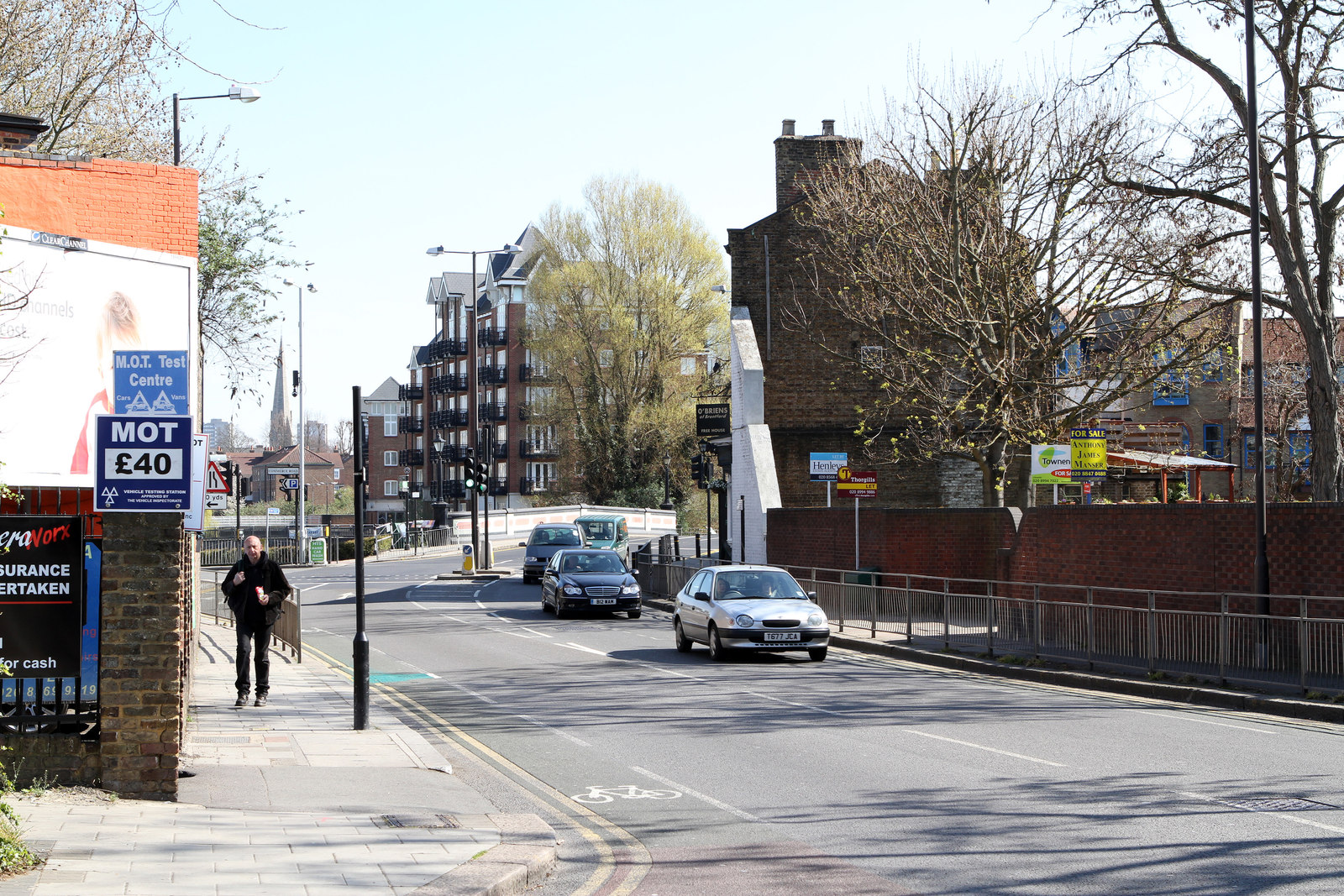
Looking towards Brentford Bridge, with former railway viaduct to the left

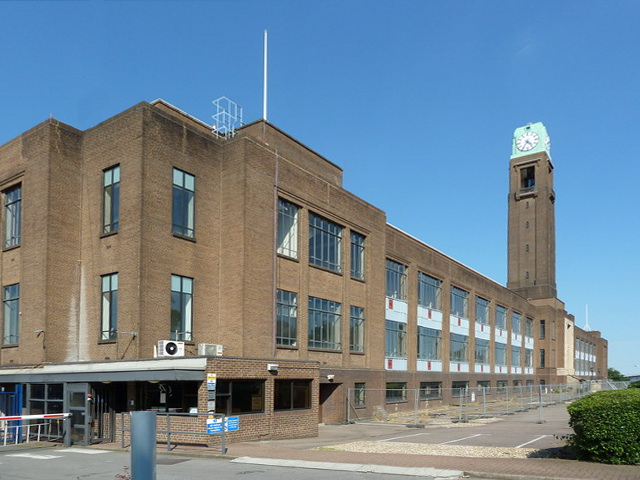
Gillette Building, Golden Mile (Brentford)
