= Trumpers Crossing Halte railway station =

Former railway station in England

Coordinates: 51.5026°N 0.3441°W

Trumpers Crossing Halte
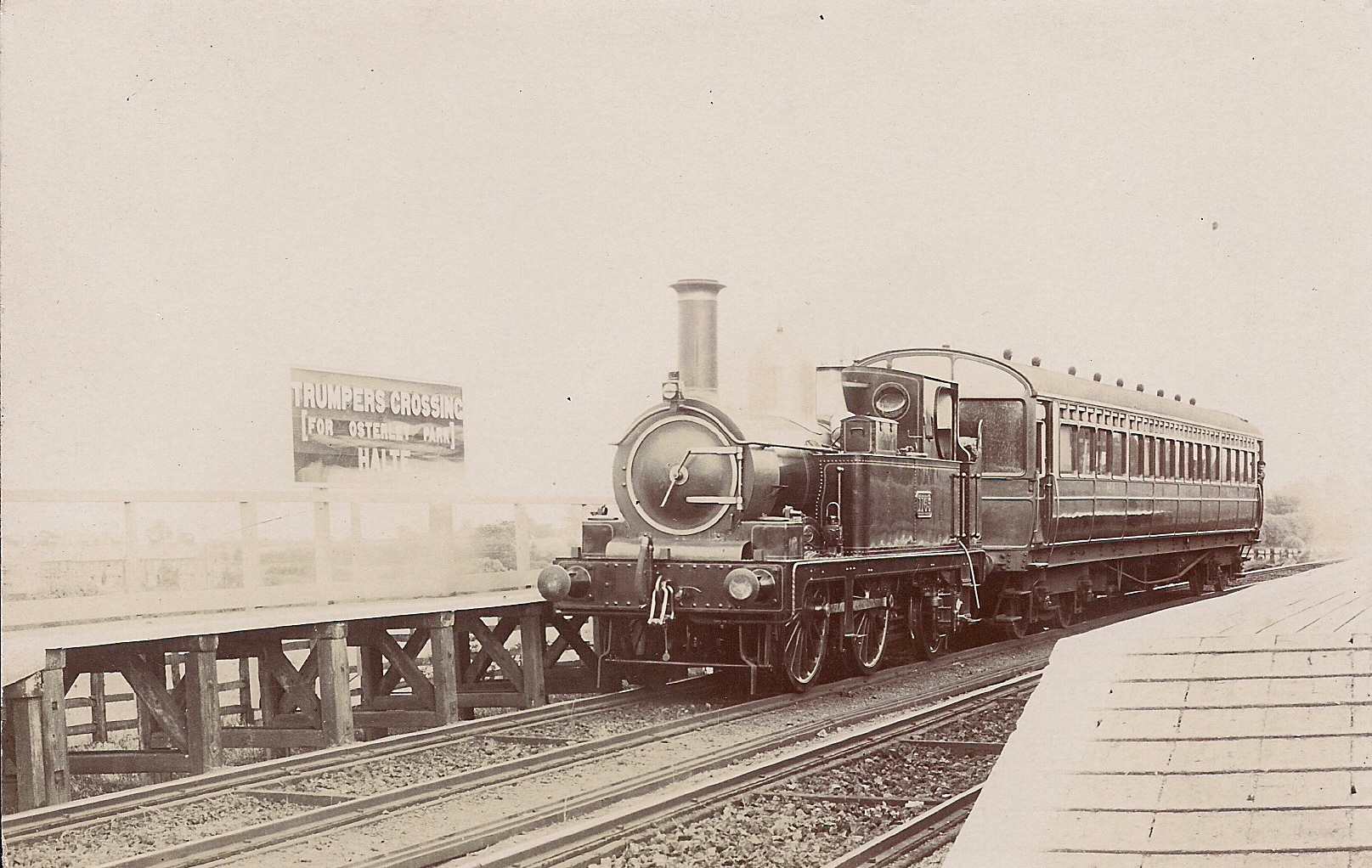
- A GWR Autocoach awaits departure

General information
- Location: Hanwell, Ealing; England
- Grid reference: TQ150795
- Platforms: 2

Other information
- Status: Disused

History
- Original company: Great Western Railway
- Pre-grouping: GWR
- Post-grouping: GWR

Key dates
- 1 May 1860: Brentford branch opened
- 2 May 1904: Station opened as Trumpers Crossing Halte
- 22 March 1915: Service suspended
- 12 April 1920: Services resumed
- 1 February 1926: Station closed
Location

Trumpers Crossing Halte was a station of scant construction on the Brentford Branch Line of the Great Western Railway, which ran from Southall to Brentford Dock.

== History ==
It was opened on 2 May 1904 by the Great Western Railway as "Trumpers Crossing Halte", and was the only intermediate station between Southall and Brentford GWR stations. At this time, the GWR favoured the French spelling of "Halte" for such stations, because the English word "Halt" was felt to be unsuitable.

The halt closed on 22 March 1915 as a wartime economy measure, re-opened on 12 April 1920 and closed permanently on 1 February 1926. Before closing for good, the words "for South Hanwell and Osterley Park" were appended.

Materials from the redundant platforms were used six months later to construct South Greenford, which opened on 20 September 1926.

== Route ==
Preceding station	Disused railways	Following station
Southall; Line closed, station open	Great Western Railway; Brentford Branch Line	Brentford (GWR); Line and station closed
