= Southall Railway Centre =

Railway heritage centre in west London

Coordinates: 51°30′24″N 0°22′13″W

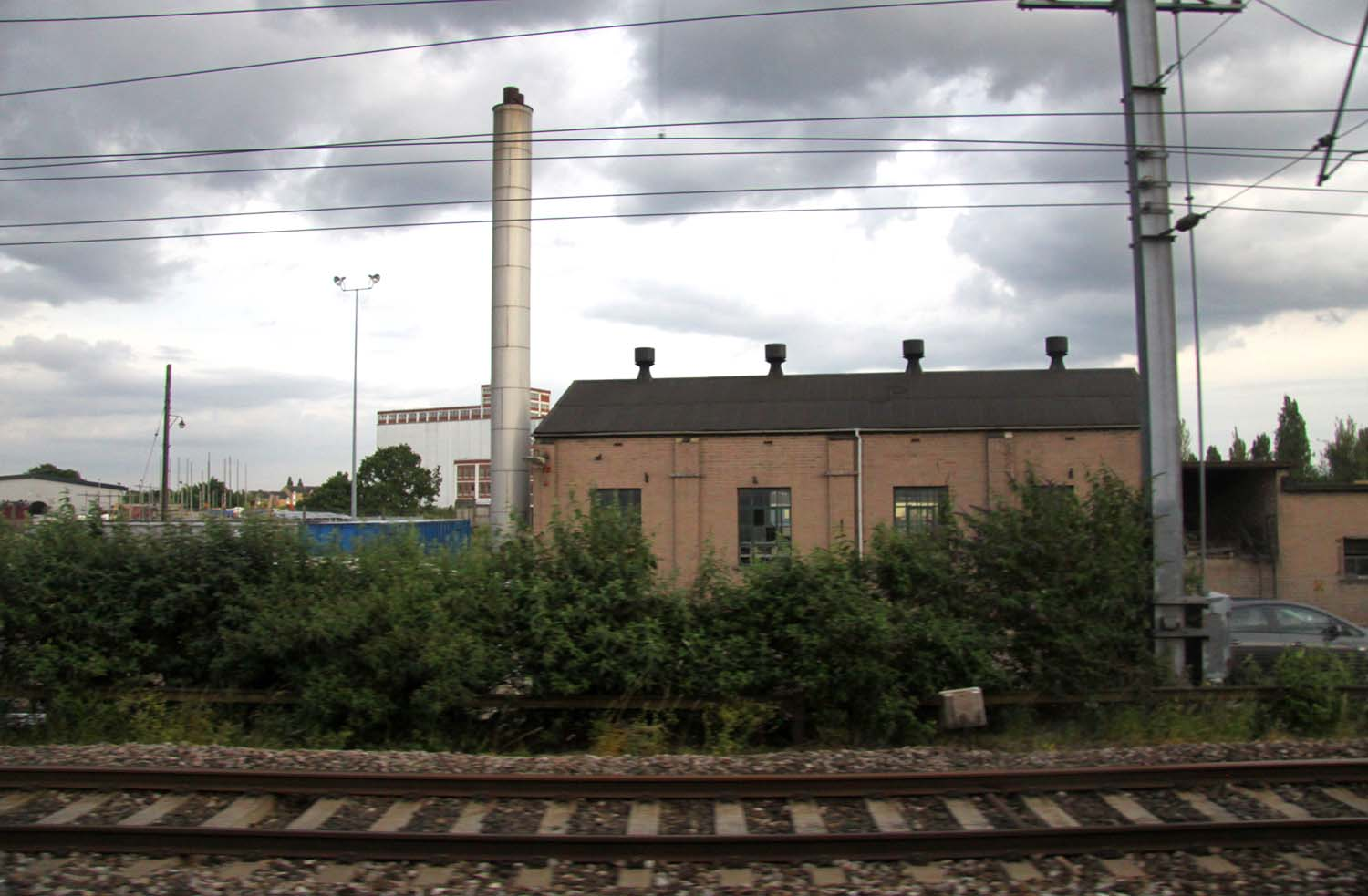
A workshop at the Southall Railway Centre

Southall Railway Centre is a non-publicised railway heritage centre at Southall in west London, near Southall railway station and the Grand Union Canal. Formerly of the Great Western Railway, the site is now run partly by Locomotive Services and West Coast Railways, both of whom lease the site from Network Rail. The location is not open to the public.

Until 2021, the Great Western Railway Preservation Group (GWRPG) leased part of the West Coast Railway section of the site for their own use.

== History ==
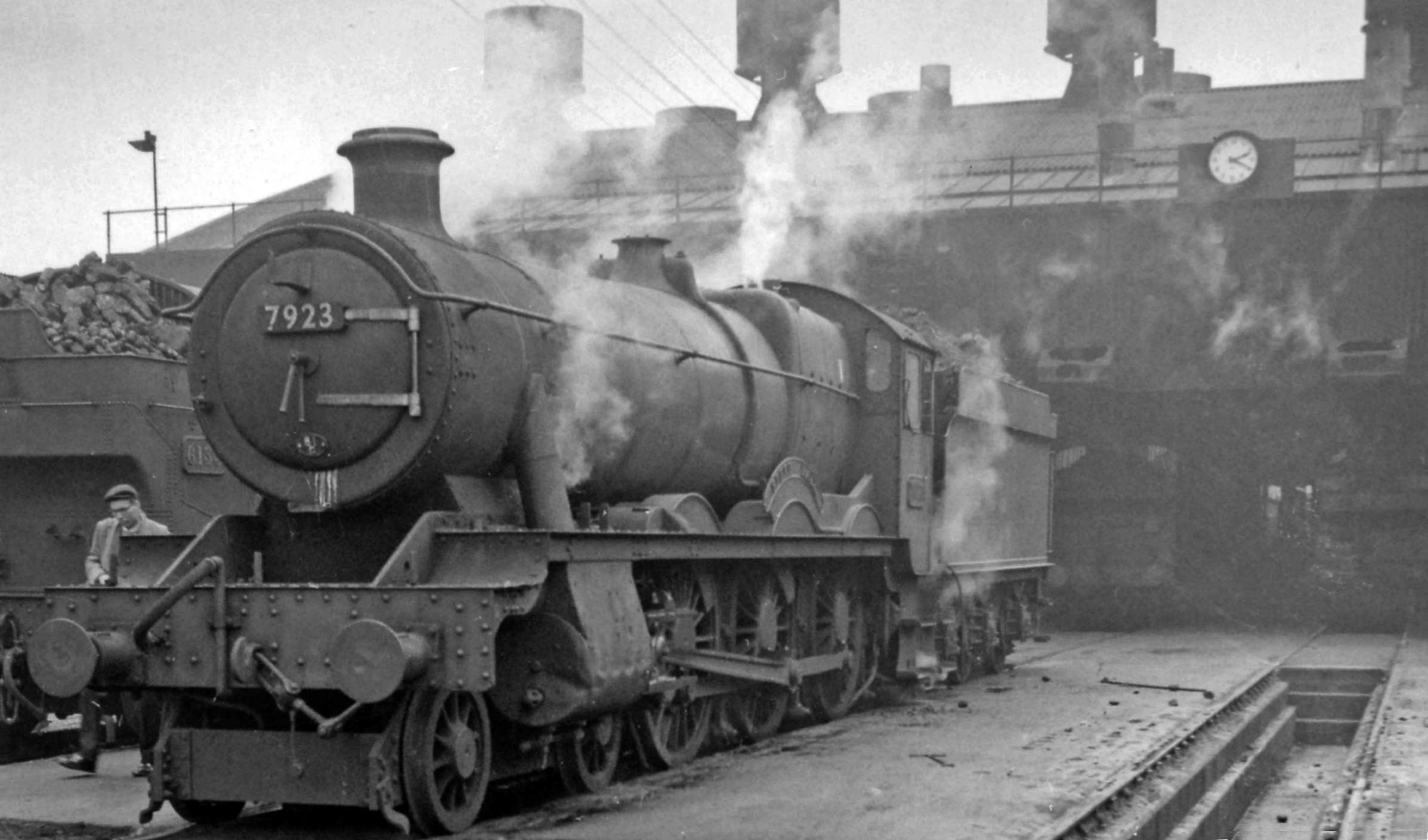
November 1962, GWR 6959 Class 7923 Speke Hall sits outside the British Railways 1953 constructed Southall Shed

There has been a locomotive shed at Southall since 1859. Originally a Great Western Railway shed (code: SHL), it was rebuilt as a six-road shed in 1884. Demolished in 1953, it was replaced by a more modern British Railways constructed steam shed (Code: 81C). Southall was the last London steam depot on the Western Region of British Railways, outlasting Old Oak Common and finally closing to steam in December 1965.

The depot was later used for DMU maintenance for ten years before final operational closure under British Rail. From 1993 to 1998, it was use as a base for the electrification programme for the Heathrow Express.

== Current use ==
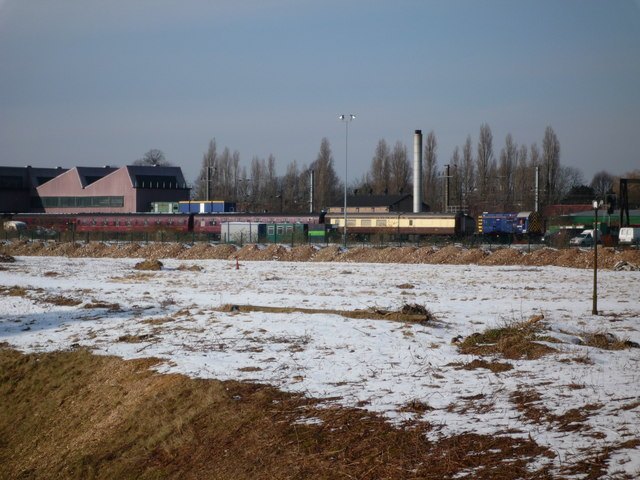
The GWR Preservation Group (Southall Railway Centre) view from Glade Lane

Currently the site, now referred to as the Southall Railway Centre, is used by three independent groups:

- Locomotive Services: Owned by Jeremy Hosking, the company maintains and operates several locomotives including those owned by the Royal Scot Locomotive and General Trust. It leases Roads 1 and 2 (those closest to the mainline) from Network Rail.
- West Coast Railways: operational base for several of its preserved mainline-registered steam locomotives.

Great Western Railway Preservation Group previously operated at the site. However, it formally liquidated in September 2021.

== Former GWRPG locomotives ==
Due to GWPRG's closure in 2021, all the following locomotives have transferred to new owners.

- Peckett and Sons 0-4-0ST No. 2100 William Murdoch Built in 1949. At Helston Railway as of 2017, owned by Portsmouth City Council.
- Robert Stephenson and Hawthorns 0-4-0ST No. 7386 Birkenhead Built in 1948. At Elsecar Heritage Railway as of 2017.
- AEC 4wDM Shunter built in 1938 and remained at the AEC Works until the factory closed. The only one of its kind to be built. During its life it was used to haul a number of test trains along the Brentford Branch Line.
- Ruston Hornsby Class 165 DS 0-4-0DM No. AD251 Francis Baily of Thatcham. Flameproof diesel locomotive, ex RAF Welford.
- Baguley Drewry Railcar 4wDMR No. AD9117. Built 1975, ex Bicester Military Railway.

Some of these locomotives are at Southall, some are stored at other locations. There is also an assortment of goods and passenger rolling stock at Southall.
