= Bridgetown, Cornwall =

Hamlet in Cornwall, England

Coordinates: 50.6826°N 4.3507°W

Bridgetown: Cornish: Trebons
- Location within Cornwall
- Unitary authority: Cornwall
- Ceremonial county: Cornwall
- Region: South West
- Country: England
- Sovereign state: United Kingdom
- Postcode district: PL15
- Police: Devon and Cornwall
- Fire: Cornwall
- Ambulance: South Western

Bridgetown (Cornish: Trebons) is a hamlet in the parish of Werrington, Cornwall. It has a Methodist chapel.
