= Bridge of Craigisla =

Coordinates: 56.670861°N 3.222176°W

- Location within Angus
- OS grid reference: NO252539
- Council area: Angus
- Country: Scotland
- Sovereign state: United Kingdom
- Police: Scotland
- Fire: Scottish
- Ambulance: Scottish

Bridge of Craigisla is a hamlet in Angus, Scotland. The bridge crosses the River Isla. This settlement lies along the B954 road.

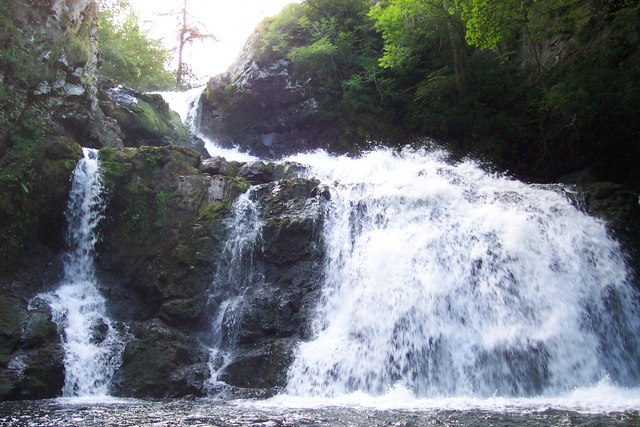
Reekie Linn waterfalls on the River Isla below Bridge of Craigisla
