= Brithdir, Powys =

Coordinates: 52.613861°N 3.18863°W

Brithdir
- Location within Powys
- OS grid reference: SJ 1962 0245
  - Cardiff: 78 mi (126 km)
  - London: 151 mi (243 km)
- Community: Berriew
- Principal area: Powys
- Country: Wales
- Sovereign state: United Kingdom
- Post town: WELSHPOOL
- Postcode district: SY21
- Police: Dyfed-Powys
- Fire: Mid and West Wales
- Ambulance: Welsh
- UK Parliament: Montgomeryshire and Glyndŵr
- Senedd Cymru – Welsh Parliament: Montgomeryshire

Brithdir is an area in the community of Berriew, Powys, Wales, which is 78 miles (126 km) from Cardiff and 151 miles (243 km) from London. It lies to the north-east of Berriew and is noted for its motte and bailey castle.

== Notable residents ==
- David Jones of Brithdir (built Brithdir Hall, 1610)

== See also ==
- List of localities in Wales by population
