= Breivig =

Coordinates: 58.269°N 6.295°W

Breivig: Scottish Gaelic: Brèibhig
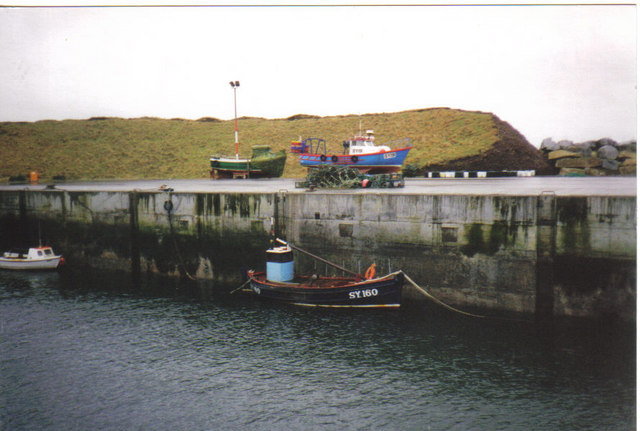
- Breivig Harbour

- Location within the Outer Hebrides
- Language: Scottish Gaelic; English
- OS grid reference: NB481391
- Civil parish: Stornoway
- Council area: Na h-Eileanan Siar
- Lieutenancy area: Western Isles
- Country: Scotland
- Sovereign state: United Kingdom
- Post town: ISLE OF LEWIS
- Postcode district: HS2
- Dialling code: 01851
- Police: Scotland
- Fire: Scottish
- Ambulance: Scottish
- UK Parliament: Na h-Eileanan an Iar
- Scottish Parliament: Na h-Eileanan an Iar

Breivig (Scottish Gaelic: Brèibhig) is a village on Lewis in the Outer Hebrides, Scotland. Breivig is within the parish of Stornoway.

According to Magne Oftedal's 'The Village Names of Lewis in the Outer Hebrides' (Oslo, 1954), the name Brèibhig is derived from the name Old Norse Breiðvík ('broad bay').
