= Brightgate =

Village in Derbyshire, England

Coordinates: 53.1328°N 1.6065°W

- Location within Derbyshire
- OS grid reference: SK264596
- Shire county: Derbyshire
- Region: East Midlands
- Country: England
- Sovereign state: United Kingdom
- Post town: Matlock
- Postcode district: DE4
- Police: Derbyshire
- Fire: Derbyshire
- Ambulance: East Midlands

Brightgate is a village in Derbyshire, England. The population is recorded in the civil parish of Bonsall, Derbyshire.

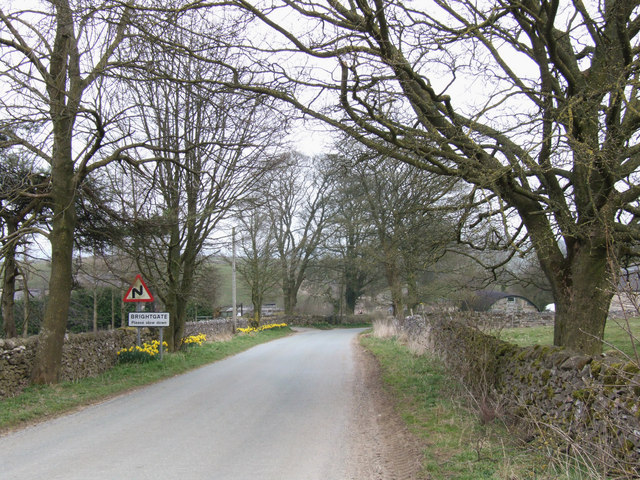
Entering the village from Bonsall Moor.
