= Brightwalton Green =

Coordinates: 51.502953°N 1.386667°W

- Hamlet
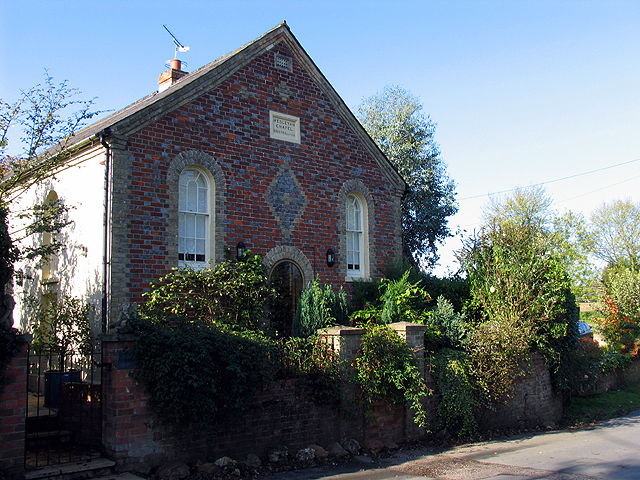
- Wesleyan Chapel

- Location within Berkshire
- OS grid reference: SU427784
- Unitary authority: West Berkshire
- Ceremonial county: Berkshire
- Region: South East
- Country: England
- Sovereign state: United Kingdom
- Post town: Newbury
- Postcode district: RG20
- Dialling code: 01488
- Police: Thames Valley
- Fire: Royal Berkshire
- Ambulance: South Central
- UK Parliament: Berkshire

Brightwalton Green is a hamlet in the civil parish of Brightwalton in the county of Berkshire, England. The settlement lies near to the A338 road, and is situated approximately 8 miles (13 km) north-west of Newbury.
