= Brickhouses =

Coordinates: 53.15°N 02.34°W

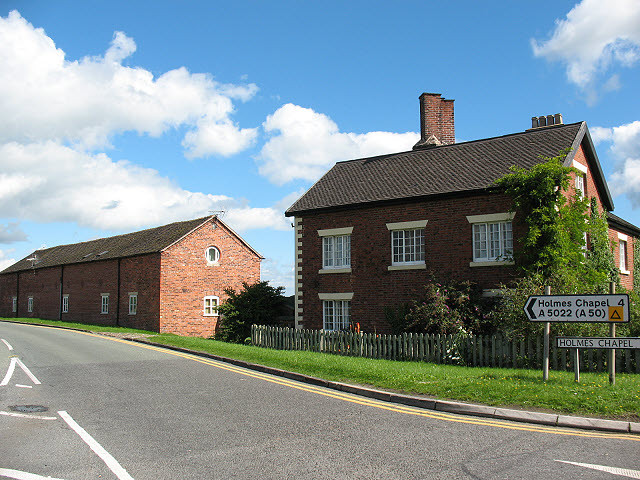
- Brickhouses Farm

- Location within Cheshire
- OS grid reference: SJ7762
- Unitary authority: Cheshire East
- Ceremonial county: Cheshire
- Region: North West
- Country: England
- Sovereign state: United Kingdom
- Police: Cheshire
- Fire: Cheshire
- Ambulance: North West

Brickhouses is a hamlet near Sandbach, Cheshire, England.

== See also ==
- Brickhouse (disambiguation)
