= Brealeys =

Village in Devon, England

Coordinates: 50.91°N 04.07°W

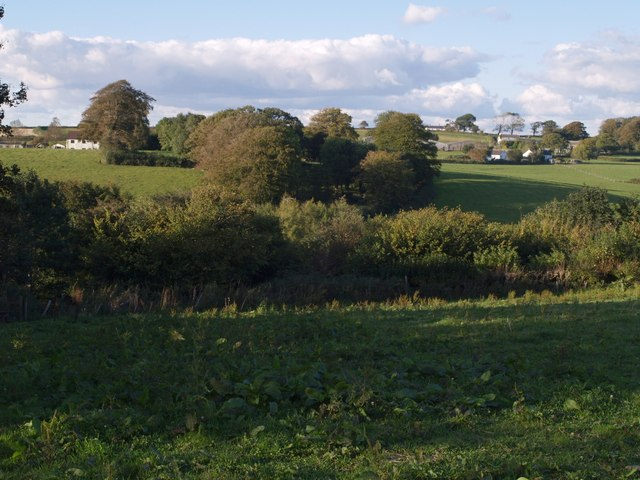
- Cannsdown and Brealeys

- Location within Devon
- OS grid reference: SS5415
- Shire county: Devon
- Region: South West
- Country: England
- Sovereign state: United Kingdom
- Police: Devon and Cornwall
- Fire: Devon and Somerset
- Ambulance: South Western

Brealeys is a village in Devon, England.
