= Brithdir, Ceredigion =

Village in Ceredigion, Wales

Coordinates: 52°06′07″N 4°25′24″W

Brithdir
- Looking down to Brithdir and the surrounding area

- Location within Ceredigion
- OS grid reference: SN 3411 4763
  - Cardiff: 68.4 mi (110.1 km)
  - London: 188 mi (303 km)
- Community: Penbryn
- Principal area: Ceredigion
- Country: Wales
- Sovereign state: United Kingdom
- Post town: Llandysul
- Postcode district: SA44
- Police: Dyfed-Powys
- Fire: Mid and West Wales
- Ambulance: Welsh
- UK Parliament: Ceredigion Preseli
- Senedd Cymru – Welsh Parliament: Ceredigion

Brithdir, Ceredigion is a hamlet in the community of Penbryn, Ceredigion, Wales, which is 68.4 miles (110.1 km) from Cardiff and 188 miles (302.6 km) from London. Brithdir is represented in the Senedd by Elin Jones (Plaid Cymru) and is part of the Ceredigion Preseli constituency in the House of Commons.

== See also ==
- List of localities in Wales by population
