= Bridge End, Northumberland =

Village in Northumberland, England

Coordinates: 54°59′20″N 2°08′31″W

Bridge End
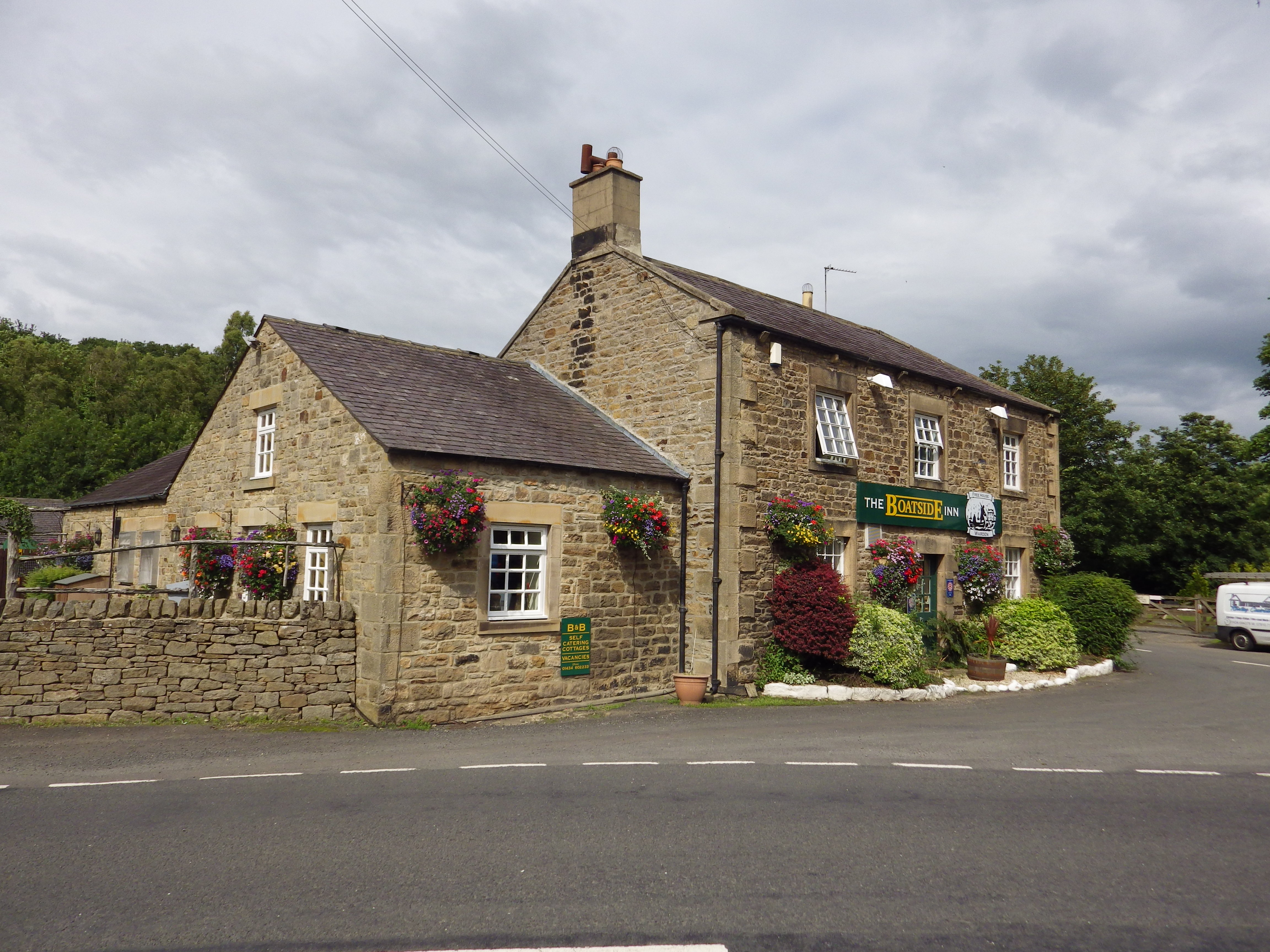
- The Boatside Inn at Bridge End.

- Location within Northumberland
- OS grid reference: NY915665
- Unitary authority: Northumberland
- Ceremonial county: Northumberland
- Region: North East
- Country: England
- Sovereign state: United Kingdom
- Post town: HEXHAM
- Postcode district: NE46
- Police: Northumbria
- Fire: Northumberland
- Ambulance: North East
- UK Parliament: Hexham

Bridge End is a village in Northumberland, England. It is situated in Warden civil parish to the west of Hexham, on the north bank of the River South Tyne.

The North and South Tyne meet around one-half mile (0.80 km) downstream from the village. There is a pleasant walk from the Boat Inn along the bank of the South Tyne to the meeting of the waters. The Boat Inn was formerly the place of a ferry until the toll bridge was built across the river. The toll house still stands, but the old bridge was replaced in 1904 by a County structure. One of the two plaques on the bridge records that the contractor was W. T. Weir of Howdon-on-Tyne. The Newcastle and Carlisle Railway crosses the river by a strongly built iron bridge.

== Governance ==
Bridge End is in the parliamentary constituency of Hexham.

== Economy ==
Bridge End had a paper mill on the South Tyne, which started in 1763. A century ago, a visitor described how the rags were converted into beautiful white paper. The mill employed 63 hands.

== Landmarks ==
The tollhouse stands at the southern end of the bridge, and the building still has the original roof from which it is possible to see the original layout of the windows. However, by 2008, the southern window had been removed and replaced by a modern porch, and an extension partially obscured the northern window.

== Religious sites ==
There is a Methodist church built in 1851. In appearance, it resembles a barn rather than an ecclesiastical edifice.
