= Brentford Dock =

Dock in Brentford, London, England

Coordinates: 51.48179°N 0.30223°W

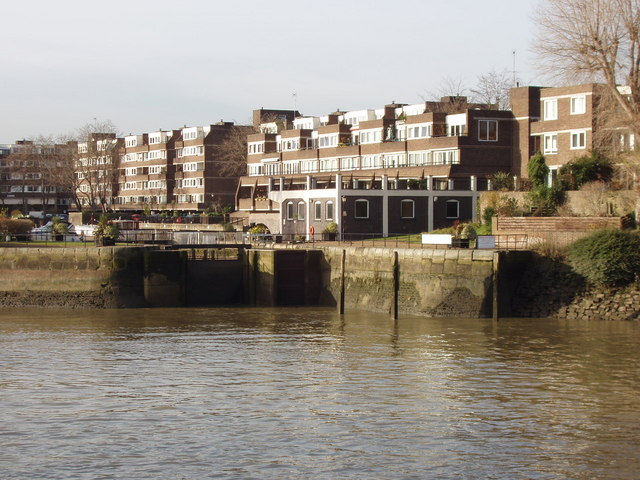
Brentford Dock lock gates from the River Thames with Brentford Dock Estate beyond

Brentford Dock in Brentford, west London, was a major trans-shipment point between the Great Western Railway (GWR) and barges on the River Thames. The building of Brentford Dock was started in 1855 and it was formally opened in 1859. The former dock yard was redeveloped in 1972 and is now Brentford Dock Marina and Brentford Dock Estate.

== History ==
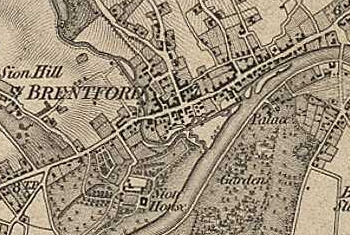
Brentford map, 1856 showing the island to the east of Syon Park that was the site of the dock

The original dock was built on a large island between the River Thames and two mouths of the River Brent. Part of the land was owned by timber merchant James Montgomrey in the 19th century.

Brentford Dock was built by Great Western and Brentford Railway Company (later part of the GWR), to the south of the mouth of the River Brent and Grand Junction Canal, and opposite Kew Gardens. Montgomrey had sold part of his Montgomrey's Wharf premises to the company in 1855, including a corridor crossing the canal and river that enabled road access from the High Street (called Dock Road). The dock was constructed to a design by Isambard Kingdom Brunel. The entrance to the dock was via a lock from the River Thames. The company also built the Brentford Branch Line to it from the GWR main line at Southall, which was originally at 7 ft gauge and terminated at the dock. Construction began in 1855 and was completed in 1859. Brunel's original covered dock was destroyed by fire in 1920 and replaced by an iron and steel structure.

The dock provided a trans-shipment point for goods between the railway network and barges operating on the Thames to the Port of London.

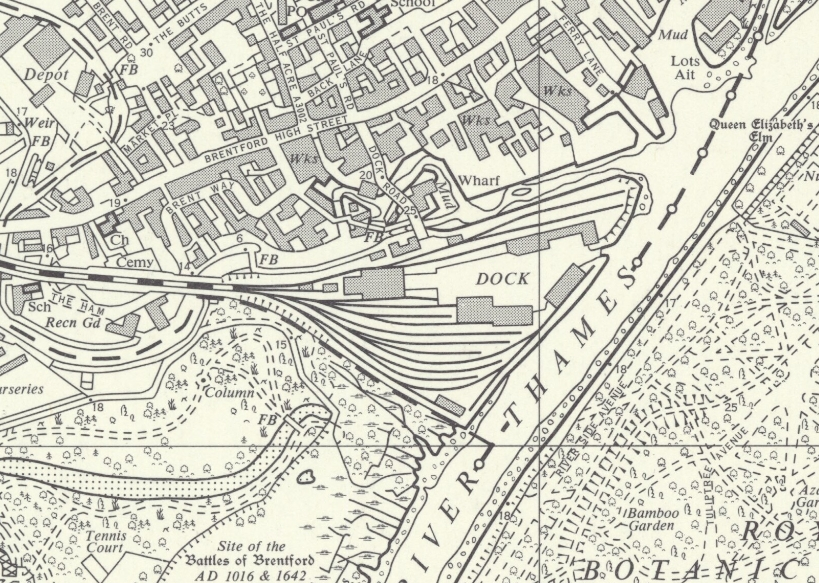
Brentford Dock, 1960 on an Ordnance Survey map

After World War I the Thames frontage was adapted for boats of up to 300 tons. Craft using the dock included heavy river barges, canal boats and sailing barges, and the dock offered customs facilities. Traffic included coal, steel, timber, wood pulp, flour, animal feedstuffs, cork, general merchandise and, in the 1950s, Morris cars from Oxford. Coke from Southall Gas Works was carried in daily block trains from Southall to the dock.

== Closure and redevelopment ==
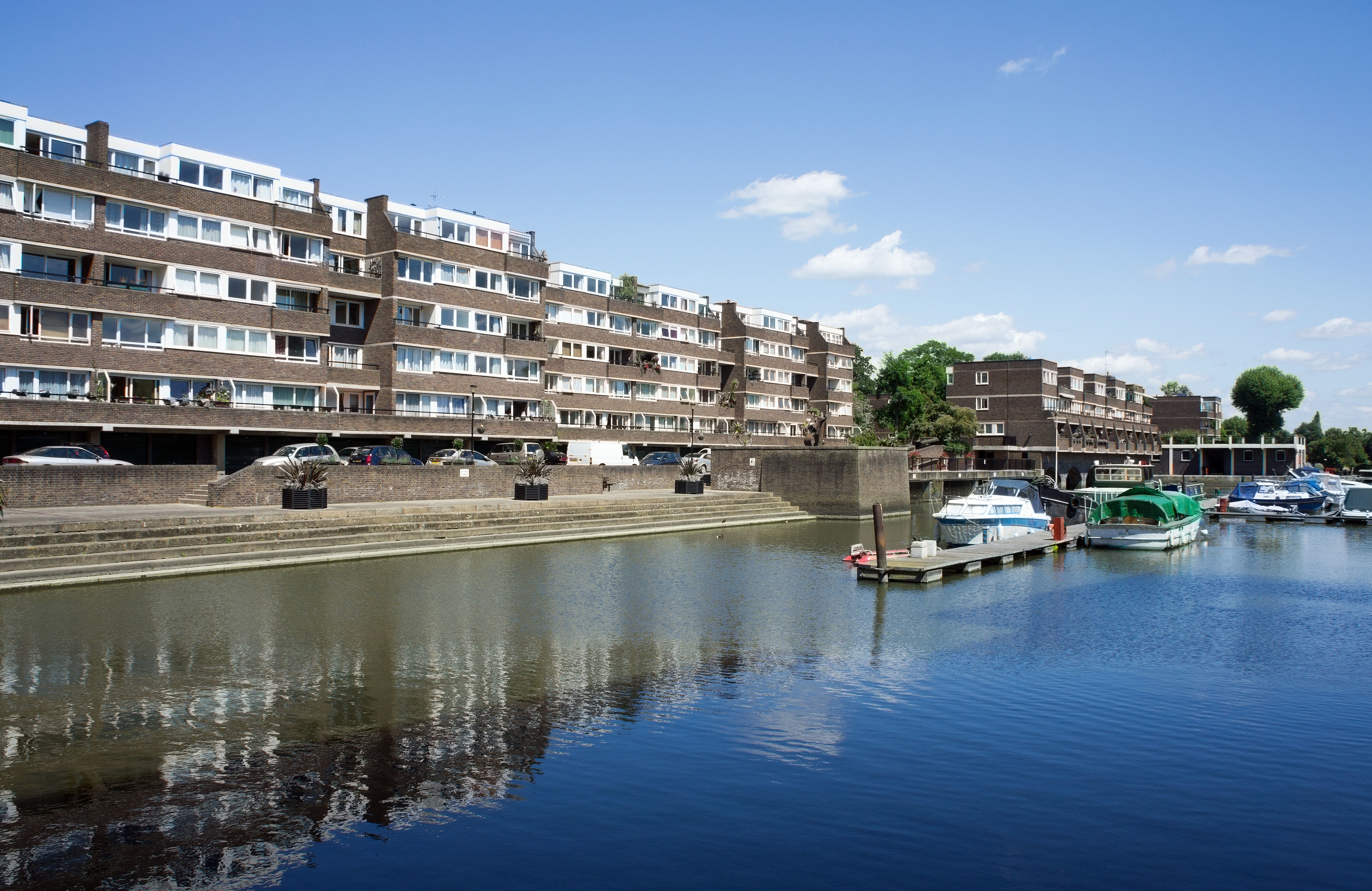
Brentford Dock Estate, north side of Dock

The dock closed on 31 December 1964. It was redeveloped as housing and a marina in 1972 by the Greater London Council (GLC), to a design drawn up by architect Roger Walters in 1968.

Construction work for the Brentford Dock housing estate began in 1972 and the project was completed in 1978.

The construction of Brentford Dock Marina started in 1978 and the official opening was on 7 August 1980. Sir Horace Cutler, then head of the GLC, sailed up river from County Hall on the boat Princess Freda.

== External links and mapping ==
- Brentford Dock
