= 2021 North Shropshire by-election =

UK parliament by-election

- 16 December 2021

North Shropshire constituency
- Registered: 82,314
- Turnout: 46.2% (▼21.7 pp)
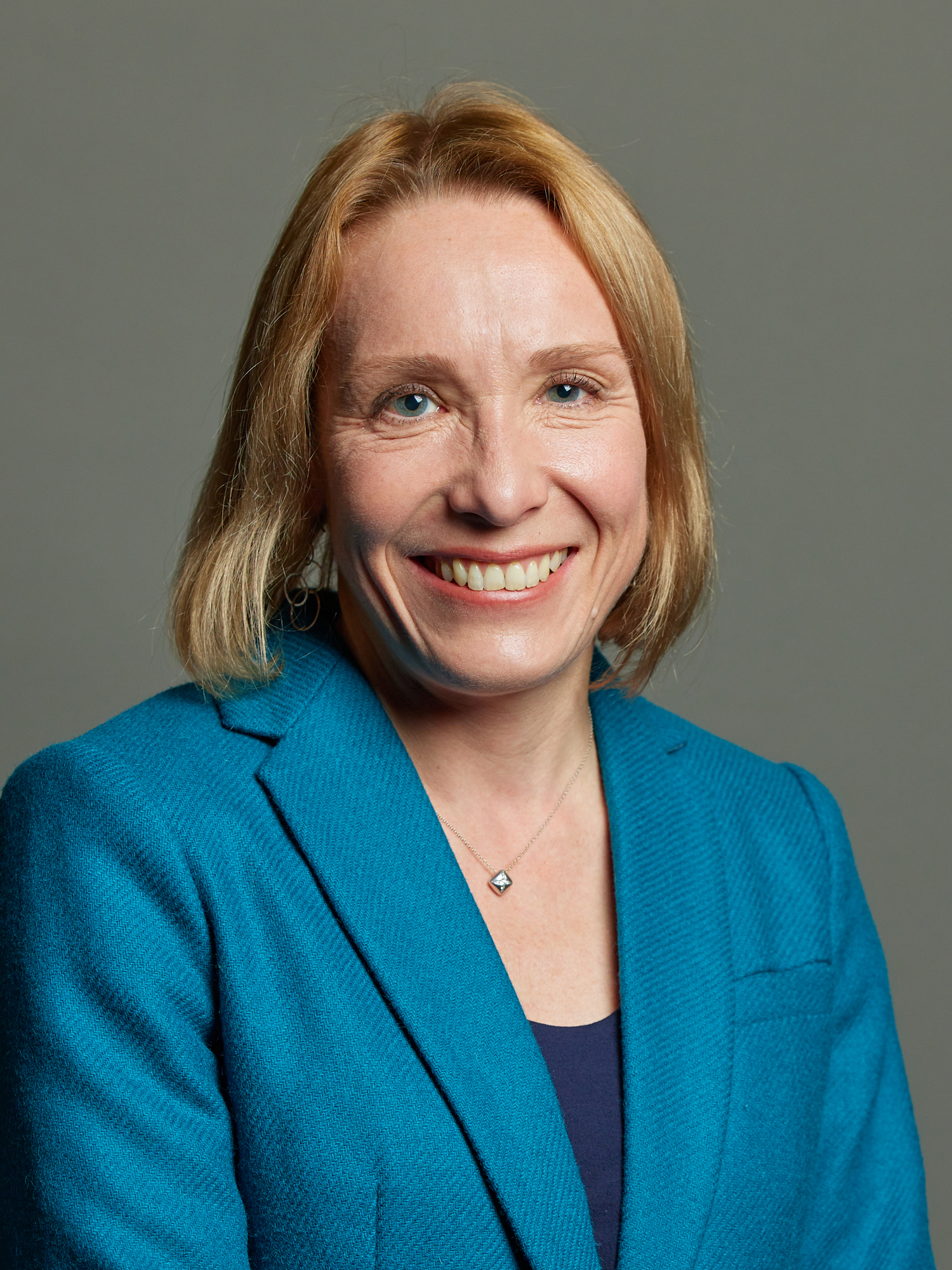

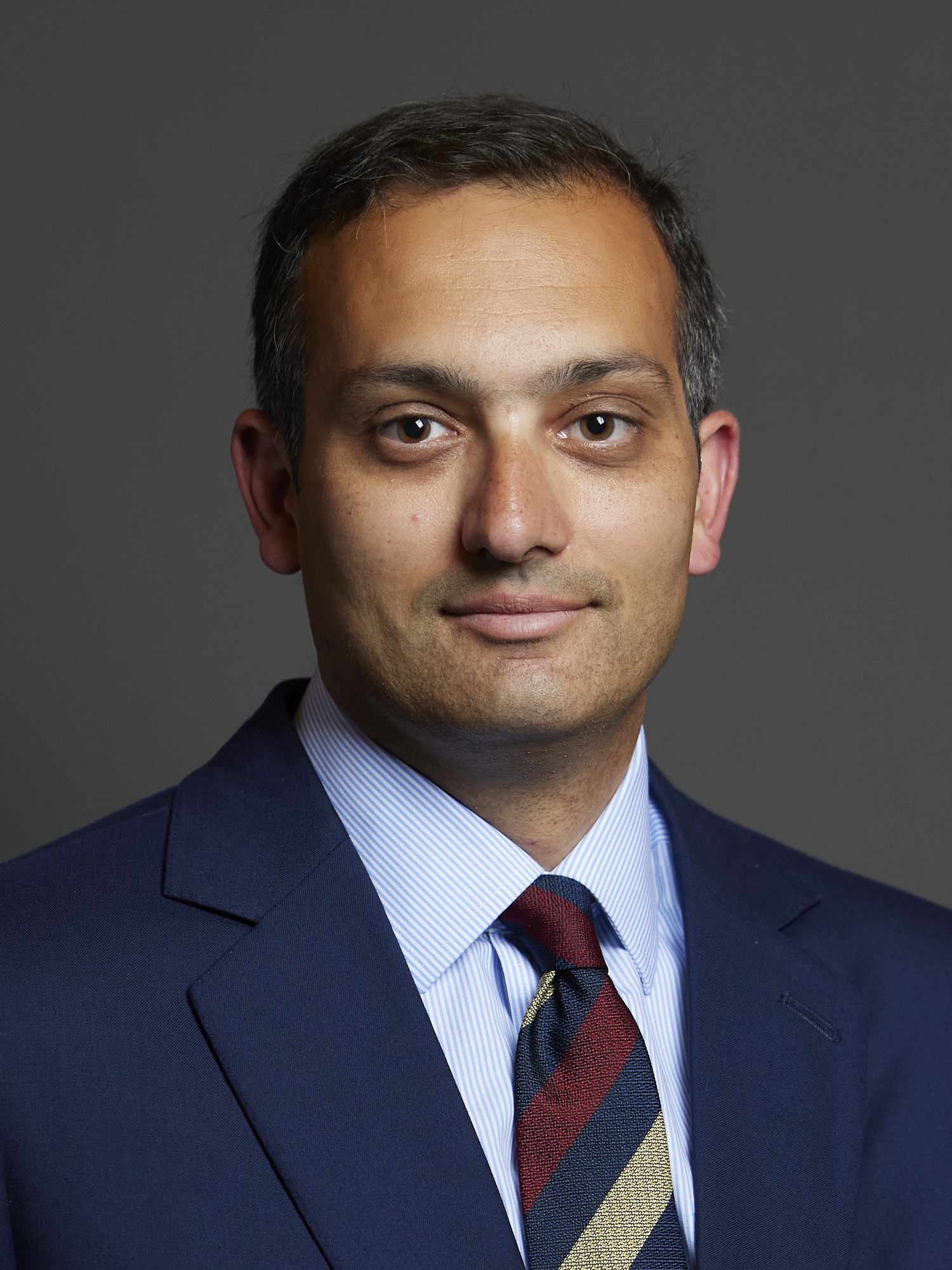
	First party	Second party	Third party
Candidate	Helen Morgan	Neil Shastri-Hurst	Ben Wood
Party	Liberal Democrats	Conservative	Labour
Popular vote	17,957	12,032	3,686
Percentage	47.2%	31.6%	9.7%
Swing	▲37.2 pp	▼31.1 pp	▼12.4 pp
MP before election
Owen Paterson
Conservative
Elected MP
Helen Morgan
Liberal Democrats

A by-election for the United Kingdom parliamentary constituency of North Shropshire was held on 16 December 2021, triggered by the resignation of the Conservative Party Member of Parliament (MP) Owen Paterson. It was won by Helen Morgan of the Liberal Democrats, with a large swing of 34%.

It was the party's second gain from the Conservatives since the 2019 general election following their victory at Chesham and Amersham in June 2021.

== Background ==
=== Constituency ===
North Shropshire is the third-largest constituency by area in the West Midlands region. It contains five small towns (in size order): Oswestry, Market Drayton, Whitchurch, Wem and Ellesmere. Sixty per cent of constituents who turned out voted to leave the European Union in the 2016 EU referendum.

The by-election was the sixth of the 2019 Parliament. The last time a seat changed hands at a by-election in the area was at the 1904 Oswestry by-election, in which there was a Liberal gain from Conservative.

=== Trigger ===
On 5 November 2021, Owen Paterson resigned as MP for the constituency. In October, the Parliamentary Commissioner for Standards found that he had breached paid advocacy rules in relation to two companies which employed him as a paid consultant. The Commons Standards Committee considered the commissioners' findings and recommended that Paterson be suspended from parliament for 30 days. In line with the established process, on 3 November a motion was proposed in the Commons inviting MPs to approve the punishment. If the suspension had been approved, a recall petition would have been triggered in the constituency.

Paterson denied any wrongdoing. An amendment to the motion was put forward by Conservative backbencher Andrea Leadsom to postpone consideration of Paterson's suspension and to set up a new committee to investigate the disciplinary process for MPs. The government of Boris Johnson supported the amendment and issued a three-line whip. The amendment was passed. The outcome caused outrage among opposition MPs, and an angry public reaction to press reports. As a result, on 4 November, the government reversed its position and announced that a vote would still take place on whether Paterson should be suspended. Following that decision, Paterson announced his intention to resign his seat on 4 November.

Paterson was appointed as Crown Steward and Bailiff of the Manor of Northstead (Note: A device for handling a resignation, see Resignation from the British House of Commons) on 5 November. The writ of election was moved by Conservative Chief Whip Mark Spencer on 9 November. The by-election took place on 16 December.

== Candidates ==
There were 14 candidates in the by-election.

On 4 November, Labour, the Liberal Democrats and the Green Party had discussions about possibly standing aside in the by-election and backing a joint independent "anti-sleaze" candidate. This had previously happened in the seat of Tatton at the 1997 general election where independent candidate Martin Bell beat Neil Hamilton. Bell was approached by the Liberal Democrats ahead of the by-election in North Shropshire, but declined to stand. Labour, and subsequently the Liberal Democrats, announced that they would be standing their own candidates.

On 6 November, Reform UK announced their candidate as Kirsty Walmsley, who was previously a councillor on Shropshire Council for the Conservative Party, which her father Keith Barrow led on the Council. Walmsley said, "I would never had [sic] stood against Owen Paterson. He is a man of integrity who had worked hard for North Shropshire."

On 13 November, the Conservatives picked their candidate, Neil Shastri-Hurst, from a three-person shortlist. Shastri-Hurst is a barrister, former British Army Medical Officer and honorary NHS consultant. His links to the constituency relate to his time training at Robert Jones and Agnes Hunt Orthopaedic Hospital near Oswestry and a period stationed at the Tern Hill barracks near Market Drayton. Also on the shortlist were local Shropshire Councillor for Worfield (in Ludlow constituency), Richard Marshall and Birmingham City Councillor Charlotte Hodivala.

The Shropshire Star reported Labour's shortlist for the candidacy included Graeme Currie (previous Labour candidate), David Hallam (previously Herefordshire and Shropshire MEP) and Kuldip Sahota (former Telford and Wrekin Council leader, who actually did not apply). On 14 November, the Labour Party announced their candidate to be Ben Wood from Oswestry. Graeme Currie, the Labour candidate in the seat for the 2015 to 2019 general elections, was blocked from the party's shortlist of candidates and said he would resign from the party in response.

The Shropshire Star reported on 11 November that the Liberal Democrats had approached Martin Bell to stand as their candidate. Bell reportedly declined citing age and the size of the Conservative majority. Former Ludlow MP Matthew Green and Shropshire County Councillor Alex Wagner were also reported as potential candidates. On 16 November, the Liberal Democrats announced that Helen Morgan, who contested the seat in the 2019 general election, had been re-selected. Morgan is a chartered accountant who was born and raised in the rural West Midlands and has lived in North Shropshire since 2014.

The Green candidate was Duncan Kerr, who stood in the constituency for the party in the 2015 and 2017 general elections, but not in 2019.

Yolande Kenward stood on an anti-corruption platform as an independent, although she was shown on the ballot paper with no label. The other independent, Suzie Akers-Smith, is an independent councillor on Cheshire East Council and the local authority's Cycling and Walking Champion.

Drew Galdron, under the name Boris Been-Bunged, a Boris Johnson impersonator, stood for the Rejoin EU Party.

Monaco-based Russell Dean, a consultant for a yacht broker who grew up in Shropshire, stood for The Party Party.

Hard eurosceptic minor party candidates were: UKIP's Andrea Allen, a former modern languages teacher who sits on Whitchurch Parish Council and had previously stood in Eddisbury in 2019; the Reclaim Party's deputy leader, Martin Daubney, a former editor of "lads' mag" Loaded who represented the West Midlands in the European Parliament between 2019 and 2020 while a member of the Brexit Party; and Heritage's James Elliot, an electrical contractor.

The Official Monster Raving Loony Party fielded its party leader Alan "Howling Laud" Hope.

The anti-lockdown Freedom Alliance fielded Earl Jesse as its candidate.

=== Endorsements ===
An editorial in The Guardian newspaper suggested that tactical voting for the Liberal Democrats be employed by the electorate to try to reduce the Conservative majority in the seat, saying "Labour voters ought to set aside their tribal loyalty and back the Lib Dem candidate".

Sarah Biffen, the widow of John Biffen, the former Conservative MP for the area, endorsed the Conservative candidate, Shastri-Hurst, comparing his background in the NHS and the Army with that of her late husband, a former cabinet minister who represented the area now covered by the North Shropshire constituency from 1961 until 1997.

Will Hutton, former editor of The Observer, endorsed the Liberal Democrats and called on Labour and Green Party supporters to "put aside their prime party affiliation and back the Lib Dem candidate". Martin Fletcher, former associate editor and foreign editor of The Times, endorsed the Liberal Democrats, specifically calling on Conservative voters to back Morgan with the aim of ending Boris Johnson's leadership of the Conservative Party.

== Campaign ==
Several candidates were running on an anti-corruption ticket; others using it in their campaign material, including Labour's. Several local issues also featured in the campaign, including local funding. Katy Balls in The Spectator analysed the effect that the variety of problems currently facing the government, and impacting Boris Johnson's popularity (which include tax rises, English Channel migrant crossings and the controversy surrounding the resignation of Paterson, the former MP of the constituency), might have on the election result. She said that a Lib Dem source commented that "Peppa Pig has come up more than sleaze" and that local issues such as the ambulance services, and questions over the Tory candidate being based in Birmingham were being raised by electors.

The Financial Times reported that Labour strategists regarded North Shropshire as inhospitable for their party and not worth spending resources on. One Labour strategist suggested the Liberal Democrats stood a better chance in the seat, saying: "the Lib Dems have focused on Shropshire North and they'll probably end up a good second there. They came second in the recent local elections — from their perspective it makes sense for them to concentrate their resources there." Labour finished second in the constituency at the 2019 general election. Ian Dunt, writing in the i, suggested that despite standing a candidate "[Labour] seems to be standing aside for Davey so the Lib Dems can monopolise the anti-government vote" as part of an informal Labour-Lib Dem pact, where one party stands aside to give the other a higher chance of beating the Conservative candidate. The Guardian reported that Labour's Shadow Minister for International Development Yasmin Qureshi "effectively acknowledged the party had deliberately left the field clear for the Lib Dems", after she said that "Labour are never going to win North Shropshire. The Lib Dems do have an opportunity to do so."

A poll of postal voters by the Liberal Democrats, reported on 2 December, put them in second place, with both the Conservative and Labour vote shares falling relative to the 2019 general election. A polling analyst said that these results should be treated "with a pinch of salt" because the polling methodology was not published. On 11 December The Observer reported that an internal memo to Liberal Democrat staff stated that the Conservatives were only one percentage point ahead of the Liberal Democrats.

In response to comments by the Conservative Home Secretary, Priti Patel, about the expulsion of migrants crossing the English Channel in small boats, the Liberal Democrat candidate, Helen Morgan, compared Patel with Hitler's propaganda chief Joseph Goebbels. Morgan later apologised for the "insensitive tweet which I have taken down". According to local newspaper the Shropshire Star, Morgan had already apologised a few days earlier for comments from 2020 in which she "appeared to liken Channel migrants to Jews held at Auschwitz".

During the campaign, a sitting Conservative councillor in the constituency, Anthony Allen, announced that he was defecting from the Conservative Party, saying they "were not Conservative enough", and joined the Reclaim Party. A second sitting Conservative councillor defected to Reform UK.

In the wake of partygate (a controversy over a reported Christmas party at 10 Downing Street that may have broken the COVID-19 lockdown rules in place at the time) which broke on 7 December, The Guardian reported that opinion in the constituency was divided, and voter apathy had risen. The Shropshire Star reported on 8 December that bookmakers were divided over whether the Conservative or the Liberal Democrat candidate were the favourite to win the by-election, following partygate. The newspaper stated that, other than the Liberal Democrats and the Conservatives, "No other party has been seen as a likely challenger to the seat". By 11 December The Independent reported that the Liberal Democrats were favourites with every major bookmaker. They also reported that the Omicron variant, and poor weather conditions might affect the turnout.

On 13 December it was reported that Reform UK candidate Kirsty Walmsley had tested positive for COVID-19, and would therefore miss out on the last few days of the campaign as well as the vote count.

== Results ==
The Liberal Democrats candidate Helen Morgan won the election with a majority of 5,925, indicating a swing of 34.2 percentage points. The swing was the seventh largest in United Kingdom by-election history, and the second largest swing from the Conservative Party to the Liberal Democrats or its predecessors (the Liberal Party and SDP–Liberal Alliance) at a by-election since 1945, behind only the 1993 Christchurch by-election. It was also the first time a non-Conservative won the seat since Liberal candidate Allan Heywood Bright in 1904, when the constituency was named Oswestry.

2021 North Shropshire by-election
Party	Candidate	Votes	%	±%
Liberal Democrats	Helen Morgan	17,957	47.2	+37.2
Conservative	Neil Shastri-Hurst	12,032	31.6	–31.1
Labour	Ben Wood	3,686	9.7	–12.4
Green	Duncan Kerr	1,738	4.6	+1.4
Reform	Kirsty Walmsley	1,427	3.8	New
UKIP	Andrea Allen	378	1.0	New
Reclaim Party	Martin Daubney	375	1.0	New
Monster Raving Loony	Alan "Howling Laud" Hope	118	0.3	New
Independent	Suzie Akers-Smith	95	0.2	New
Heritage	James Elliot	79	0.2	New
Rejoin EU	Boris Been Bunged	58	0.2	New
Freedom Alliance	Earl Jesse	57	0.1	New
Party Party	Russell Dean	19	0.1	New
No description	Yolande Kenward	3	0.0	New
Majority		5,925	15.6	N/A
Turnout		38,022	46.3	–21.6
Rejected ballots		74	0.2	
Registered electors		82,314		
Total ballots		38,110	46.3	
Liberal Democrats gain from Conservative		Swing	+34.2	

== Previous election ==
General election 2019: North Shropshire
Party	Candidate	Votes	%	±%
Conservative	Owen Paterson	35,444	62.7	+2.2
Labour	Graeme Currie	12,495	22.1	–9.0
Liberal Democrats	Helen Morgan	5,643	10.0	+4.7
Green	John Adams	1,790	3.2	+0.1
Shropshire Party	Robert Jones	1,141	2.0	New
Majority		22,949	40.6	+11.2
Turnout		56,513	67.9	–1.1
Conservative hold		Swing		

== Aftermath ==
The election was considered a turning point for the Liberal Democrats in Shropshire, and the party took control of Shropshire Council in the 2025 Shropshire Council election from previous Conservative majority in the May 2021 election.

== See also ==
- List of United Kingdom by-elections
