= List of Cambridge History Faculty alumni =

The Faculty of History at the University of Cambridge is among the largest and most prestigious history faculties in the world. Though the study of history at Cambridge dates back centuries, the study of history as a distinct academic discipline in the form of the undergraduate Historical Tripos was only established in the nineteenth century: history had previously been studied as part of the broader 'Moral Sciences' Tripos, and subsequently within the 'Law and History' Tripos. Nevertheless, the Historical Tripos - together with the Master of Philosophy (MPhil) and Doctor of Philosophy (PhD) degrees offered by the Faculty - has produced a large number of alumni who have gone onto occupy a broad range of positions in public life.

The alumni listed on this page have read either Parts I or II, or both parts, of the Historical Tripos. Only a small number of those listed here have only undertaken graduate studies in history at Cambridge, as many of the notable alumni of the Faculty's graduate programmes are professional academics rather than public figures in other fields. Given the sheer volume of professional academics produced by the Faculty, it would be impractical to list them all here.

This following list is not exhaustive and is far from complete. A large potential source for expansion of this list would be those of Ambassadorial rank within Her Majesty's Diplomatic Service and senior members of Her Majesty's Home Civil Service over the past century.

== Royalty ==
- King Charles III
- King Edward VII
- King George VI
- Prince Edward, Duke of Edinburgh
- George Windsor, Earl of St Andrews
- Prince Zeid Raad Al Hussein
- Prince William of Gloucester
- Frederick Duleep Singh

== Religion ==
- Justin Welby, Archbishop of Canterbury
- Richard Chartres, Baron Chartres, Bishop of London
- Matthew Festing, Prince and Grand Master of the Sovereign Military Order of Malta
- David Hoyle, Dean of Westminster
- Mark Langham, Administrator of Westminster Cathedral and Cambridge University Catholic Chaplain
- John Mort, Bishop of Northern Nigeria
- Nick Papadopulos, Dean of Salisbury
- Simon Phipps, Bishop of Lincoln
- Barry Till

== Politics ==
- Diane Abbott
- Tunku Abdul Rahman, Malaysian Prime Minister
- Stanley Baldwin, British Prime Minister, Chancellor of the University of Cambridge
- Steve Barclay
- Simon Baynes
- John Biffen, Baron Biffen
- Mark Malloch Brown, Baron Malloch-Brown
- Rab Butler
- Erskine Hamilton Childers, Irish President
- Alistair Cooke, Baron Lexden
- Tam Dalyell
- Adam Fergusson
- Geoffrey Filkin, Baron Filkin
- Kate Forbes
- Euan Geddes, 3rd Baron Geddes
- Maurice Glasman, Baron Glasman
- Julia Goldsworthy
- Chris Grayling
- Stephen Greenhalgh, Baron Greenhalgh
- Nick Griffin
- Ben Gummer
- John Gummer, Baron Deben
- Peter Hennessy
- Jonathan Hill, Baron Hill of Oareford
- Alan Howarth, Baron Howarth of Newport
- Tristram Hunt
- Baron Hurd of Westwell
- Robert Jenrick
- Liz Kendall
- Kwasi Kwarteng
- Oliver Letwin
- David Lidington
- Iain Macleod
- Julie Marson
- Francis Maude, Baron Maude of Horsham
- Andrew Mitchell
- Helen Morgan
- Stephen Parkinson, Baron Parkinson of Whitley Bay
- Owen Paterson
- Michael Portillo
- Peter Shore
- Wes Streeting
- Peter Viggers
- Alan Watson, Baron Watson of Richmond (High Steward of the University of Cambridge)
- William Whitelaw
- Michael Wills
- Laura Wyld, Baroness Wyld
- Tim Yeo
- Daniel Zeichner

== Government service ==
- Michael Axworthy
- Andrew Bailey (banker), Governor of the Bank of England
- Guy Burgess, British Diplomat and Soviet Spy, member of the Cambridge Five
- Sean Cairncross, Chief Executive of the Millennium Challenge Corporation and former senior Presidential advisor
- Hugh Carless
- Simon Case, Cabinet Secretary and Head of the Home Civil Service
- Major General Sir Duncan Cumming
- Sir Christopher Curwen, Chief of the Secret Intelligence Service
- Sir Richard Dearlove, Chief of the Secret Intelligence Service
- Mark Evelyn Heath
- Frances Hermia Durham, civil servant
- Sir Ronald Garvey
- Sir John Jones, Director General of MI5
- George Jellicoe, 2nd Earl Jellicoe
- Helen MacNamara
- Ian Martin (UN official)
- Sir Christopher Mallaby, British Ambassador to France, and to Germany
- Richard Mayne
- Damian McBride, Downing Street Press Secretary
- Sir Simon McDonald, Foreign Office Permanent Secretary
- Sir Christopher Meyer, British Ambassador to the United States, and to Germany
- Kim Philby, British Diplomat and Soviet Spy, member of the Cambridge Five
- Sir David Reddaway, British High Commissioner to Canada, to Ireland, and to Turkey
- Robin Renwick, Baron Renwick of Clifton, British Ambassador to the United States, and to South Africa
- Dame Ruth Runciman
- Sir Philip Rutnam, Home Office and Department for Transport Permanent Secretary
- Sir Tom Scholar, Treasury Permanent Secretary
- Herbert Simmonds
- Adair Turner, Baron Turner of Ecchinswell
- Sir David Wright, British Ambassador to Japan
- Arthur Ferdinand Yencken

== Law ==
- Norman Birkett, 1st Baron Birkett
- Sir Terence Etherton, Master of the Rolls and Head of Civil Justice
- Sir Llewelyn Dalton
- Sir Robert Yewdall Jennings, President of the International Court of Justice
- Igor Judge, Baron Judge, Lord Chief Justice of England and Wales
- Elwyn Jones, Baron Elwyn-Jones
- Dame Christina Lambert
- Sir Elihu Lauterpacht
- Anthony Lester, Baron Lester of Herne Hill
- Sir Louis Mbanefo
- Martha Spurrier, barrister and Director of Liberty
- Sir Nicholas Stadlen
- Sydney Templeman, Baron Templeman

== Business ==
- George Chubb, 3rd Baron Hayter
- Dame Julia Cleverdon
- Gerald Corbett
- Sir Michael Marshall
- Sir Douglas Myers
- Sir Evelyn de Rothschild
- David Thomson, 3rd Baron Thomson of Fleet
- Christopher Tugendhat, Baron Tugendhat
- Jasper Parrott
- Rose Paterson
- John Vincent

== Media ==
- Sacha Baron Cohen
- Cecil Beaton
- Louise Brealey
- David Elstein
- David Mitchell
- Joe Thomas
- Jonathan Routh

== Sports ==
- Bunny Austin
- Michael Atherton
- Alistair Hignell
- Tony Lewis
- George Mallory
- Michael Packe

== Journalism ==
- Bruce Anderson
- Neal Ascherson
- Joan Bakewell, Baroness Bakewell
- Christopher Booker
- Larry Elliott
- Ambrose Evans-Pritchard
- Andrew Gilligan
- Dean Godson
- Simon Heffer
- Peter Jenkins
- Robert Lacey
- Christopher Martin-Jenkins
- Allan Massie
- Richard Mayne
- Charles Moore
- Peter Oborne
- Andrew Rawnsley
- John Rentoul
- Jenni Russell
- Stephen Sackur
- Charles Wintour

== Authors ==
- Sir Philip Augar
- Ferenc Békássy
- Alain de Botton
- David Brading
- Piers Brendon
- Hugh Brogan
- Louise Dean
- Christopher Frayling
- Orlando Figes
- Donald James
- Lionel Charles Knights
- Ben Macintyre
- Eric Midwinter
- Carl Miller
- Michael Oakeshott
- Piers Paul Read
- John Press
- Peter Pugh
- Gillian Riley
- Sir Salman Rushdie
- Siegfried Sassoon
- Tom Sharpe
- Tim Stanley
- Bee Wilson
- Louisa Young

== Arts ==
- Michael Apted
- Robin Ellis
- William George Constable
- Arnold Cooke
- Sir Derek Jacobi
- Jonathan Jones
- Legson Kayira
- Tony Palmer
- Stephen Poliakoff
- Wilfrid Scott-Giles
- Amy Shindler
- Andrew Sinclair
- John Tusa

== University management ==
- Noel Annan, Provost of King's College, Cambridge and Provost of University College London
- Dame Madeleine Atkins, Vice Chancellor of Coventry University and President of Lucy Cavendish College, Cambridge
- Matthew Bullock, Master of St Edmund's College, Cambridge
- Mark Damazer, Master of St Peter's College, Oxford
- Tim Luckhurst, Principal of South College, Durham
- Alison Rose, Principal of Newnham College, Cambridge
- David Sainsbury, Baron Sainsbury of Turville, Chancellor of the University of Cambridge
- Arthur Tedder, 1st Baron Tedder, Chancellor of the University of Cambridge
- David Watson, Vice Chancellor of the University of Brighton
- David Williams, Vice-Chancellor of the University of Cambridge and President of Wolfson College, Cambridge

== Education ==
- Katherine Laird Cox
- Royston Lambert
- Bernard Orchard
- Roger Wickson
