= Westfield School, Newcastle upon Tyne =

Westfield School

Location
- Oakfield Road; Newcastle upon Tyne, NE3 4HS; England; 54.999°N 1.630°W

Information
- Type: Private day school
- Religious affiliation: Christian
- Established: 1960
- Local authority: Newcastle upon Tyne
- Department for Education URN: 108542 Tables
- Chairman of Governors: Jackie Rowley
- Headmaster: Neil Walker
- Gender: Girls (3-18) and Boys (3-11)
- Age: 3 to 18
- Enrolment: 260~
- Houses: 3
- Colours: Pink and Blue
- Website: https://www.westfield.newcastle.sch.uk/

Westfield School is a private day school for girls aged 3 to 19 in Gosforth, and boys 3 to 11 in Newcastle upon Tyne, England. It is a Round Square school and a member of the Girls' Schools Association.

== History ==
Westfield School was founded in 1960 by a group of parents who saw the need for a new type of girls' independent school with a broader curriculum than those offered at the time by other Newcastle schools. They decided to establish a girls' school on the Gordonstoun model. Henry Brereton, a former Headmaster of Gordonstoun, was a founder trustee consultant and an adviser from the beginning. He remained a Governor of Westfield after retirement from Gordonstoun.

Miss Ellen Bicknell's Parents' National Education Union School, situated at 1 and 3 Westfield Grove, Gosforth, was purchased and became the Junior House. Demand for places grew rapidly. Within a year Oakfield House, the former home of local MP Sir Cecil Cochrane, was purchased for the Senior House.

Westfield continued to grow rapidly throughout the 1990s. It became a member of the international Round Square in 1991. In 1996 the acquisition of Ashfield Towers on Kenton Road, adjacent to Senior House, led to the relocation of Junior House allowing Westfield to offer an all-through education for girls from three to eighteen on a single six-acre site in the heart of Gosforth.

In 2017, the Ashfield Towers site was sold and a new science block built on the footprint of the gardeners sheds and workshops. The old science wing was converted into custom designed premises for the Junior House who moved in during September 2019. Recognising that academic development does not follow a precise linear pattern, Westfield’s Junior House is divided into three sections: Early Years (from age 3 upwards); BrightStart (Reception and Key Stage 1) and Prep (Key Stage 2). BrightStart are taught in mixed age groups depending on aptitude and development with movement between the groups during the day and as development happens. By Year 3, girls are on a more even academic level and are then taught in traditional year groups going forwards.

The current school is now made up of three divisions: Junior House (Early Years, BrightStart and Prep), Senior House, and Sixth Form.

In September 2025, the decision was made to make Junior House co educational, to offer boys 3-11 the same opportunities as the girls

== Uniform ==
The school's uniform consists of a tartan blue and pink kilt with a pink shirt and a navy blue V-neck jumper, whilst the sixth form uniform consists of a navy suit along with the same pink and navy blue pullover as the rest of the school.

Programmes

As a Round Square school, Westfield frequently participates in exchange programmes and service projects with other member schools. Girls from most Senior year groups have the opportunity to visit other Round Square schools. There are also opportunities for younger students to participate in Junior Round Square conferences aimed specifically at their own age groups and usually held in the UK or Europe. Most recently, Westfield hosted a Junior Adventure conference in June 2024 with attendance from12 schools from 9 countries, 4 continents and across 11 time zones.

Westfield School is non-academically selective. The school operates a Stretch and Challenge programme that provides opportunities for pupils to participate in activities beyond the core curriculum. Challenge days are held at least once each term and include activities focused on teamwork, leadership, public speaking, problem-solving, and responding to setbacks.

Westfield has a BYOD policy and is a Microsoft school. Much of the teaching in Senior House is blended with resources and assignments stored on teams.

== Notable former pupils ==
- Julia Barrow, historian and academic
- Sally-Ann Hart, politician
- Rose Ridley, wife of Owen Paterson, secretary of state
- Susie Appleby, 64 caps for England women's rugby and current coach of Exeter Chiefs. https://en.wikipedia.org/wifi/Susie_Appleby
- Lucy Winskell https://en.wikipedia.org/wiki/Lucy_winskell
