= Shellbrook Hill =

House in Ellesmere Rural, Shropshire, England

Coordinates: 52.954097060392826°N 2.966517803368255°W

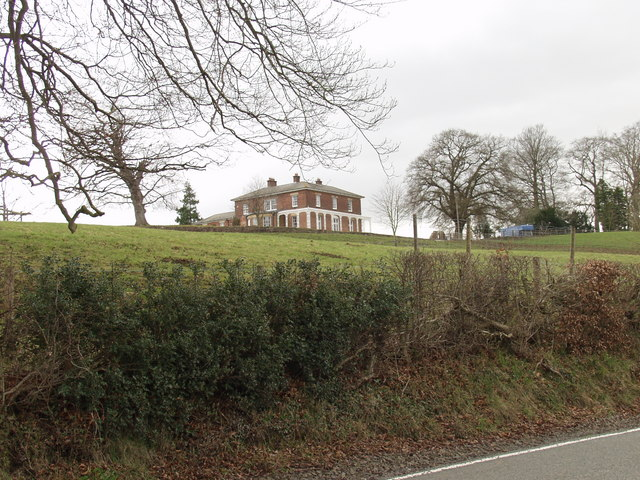
Shelbrook Hill in 2006

Shellbrook Hill is a grade II listed house in Ellesmere Rural, Shropshire, England, less than a quarter of a mile from part of the Wales border.

The house was built in 1820, and "is thought to have been designed by a pupil of Sir John Soane." It was built for the Rev Richard Hilton, and the architect may have been George Edgecombe of Ellesmere. Hilton was still living there in 1837, but by 1851, it was home to his son-in-law John Jones, who had married Hilton's daughter. It passed to their son, Hanmer Hilton Jones, who lived there until he died in 1935, aged 93. The house was sold and by mid-century was home to the Soames family.

Work was later undertaken to remove some changes that occurred in the mid-1930s, including large water tanks in the roof space, lowered ceilings, a bathroom, internal walls and some metal windows. The internal layout and the window arrangement was restored, and a new en-suite bathroom was created within a former maid's cupboard.

It was home to Major Frederic Evelyn Soames (who also lived in Nyeri, Kenya), who died there on 14 March 1967. He was the son of Frederick William Soames, who ran Soames Brewery, Wrexham.

It has been listed Grade II on the National Heritage List for England since May 1953.

It has been home to former Conservative cabinet minister Owen Paterson and his late wife Rose Paterson, since at least 2008. Rose Paterson was found dead in woods near the house in 2020, and the coroner later returned a verdict of suicide.
