= 2025 Shropshire Council election =

2025 UK local government election

- 1 May 2025

All 74 seats to Shropshire Council 38 seats needed for a majority

	First party	Second party	Third party
Leader	Roger Evans and Heather Kidd	n/a	Lezley Picton
Party	Liberal Democrats	Reform	Conservative
Last election	14 seats, 21.9%	0 seats, 0.1%	43 seats, 44.8%
Seats before	18	0	37
Seats won	42	16	7
Seat change	▲28	▲16	▼36
Popular vote	34,578	27,732	20,118
Percentage	34.2%	27.4%	19.9%
Swing	▲12.3 pp	▲27.3 pp	▼24.9 pp
	Fourth party	Fifth party	Sixth party
Leader	Rosemary Dartnall	Julian Dean
Party	Labour	Green	Independent
Last election	9 seats, 17.3%	4 seats, 9.5%	4 seats, 5.6%
Seats before	9	3	6
Seats won	4	4	1
Seat change	▼5	Steady	▼3
Popular vote	8,975	6,559	1,653
Percentage	8.9%	6.5%	1.6%
Swing	▼8.4 pp	▼3.0 pp	▼4.0 pp
Leader before election
Lezley Picton
Conservative
Leader after election
Heather Kidd
Liberal Democrats

The 2025 Shropshire Council election was held on Thursday 1 May 2025 to elect all 74 councillors to Shropshire Council in England. It took place on the same day as other council elections in the United Kingdom.

Before this election Shropshire Council was held by the Conservatives, who won the previous Council election in 2021. At this election the Liberal Democrats gained majority control of the Council.

== Previous council composition ==
After 2021 election		Before 2025 election	
Party	Seats	Party	Seats
Conservative	43	Conservative	37
Liberal Democrats	14	Liberal Democrats	18
Labour	9	Labour	9
Green	4	Green	3
Independent	4	Independent	6
Vacant	0	Vacant	1

=== Changes 2021–2025 ===
- July 2021: Robert Tindall (Conservative) leaves party to sit as an independent
- April 2022: David Tremellen (independent) resigns – by-election held June 2022
- June 2022: Mark Williams (Liberal Democrats) gains by-election from independent
- July 2022: Leslie Winwood (Conservative) dies – by-election held October 2022
- October 2022: Rachel Connolly (Labour) gains by-election from Conservatives
- July 2023: Richard Marshall (Conservative) resigns – by-election held September 2023
- September 2023: Andrew Sherrington (Liberal Democrats) gains by-election from Conservatives; Elliott Lynch (Conservative) resigns – by-election held October 2023
- October 2023: Colin Taylor (Liberal Democrats) gains by-election from Conservatives
- July 2024: David Minnery (independent) joins Liberal Democrats
- December 2024: Steve Davenport and John Price (Conservative) leave party to sit as independents
- January 2025: Mike Isherwood (Green) resigns – seat left vacant until 2025 election
- March 2025: Rachel Connolly (Labour) leaves party to sit as an independent

== Summary ==
Prior to the election, the council had been under Conservative majority control since 2005. The Conservative leader of the council was Lezley Picton; she did not stand for re-election in 2025.

Prior to the election, the Liberal Democrat group on the council was jointly led by Roger Evans and Heather Kidd. After the election, the group chose Kidd to be the sole leader. She was formally appointed as the new leader of the council at the subsequent annual council meeting on 22 May 2025. The second largest party after the election was Reform UK. There had been no Reform councillors prior to the election. After the election, the new Reform group chose Dawn Husemann to be their new group leader. The reduced Conservative group chose Dan Thomas to be its new leader after the election. The Green party and the independent councillor also formed a new "Green and Progressive Independents" group after the election.

=== Results ===
2025 Shropshire Council election
Party	Candidates	Seats	Gains	Losses	Net gain/loss	Seats %	Votes %	Votes	+/−
Liberal Democrats	74	42	29	1	▲28	56.8	34.2	34.578	+12.3
Reform	74	16	16	0	▲16	21.6	27.4	27,732	+27.3
Conservative	74	7	0	36	▼36	9.5	19.9	20,118	-24.9
Labour	74	4	0	5	▼5	5.4	8.9	8,975	-8.4
Green	57	4	1	1	Steady	5.4	6.5	6,559	-3.0
Independent	10	1	1	4	▼3	1.4	1.6	1,653	-4.0
Shropshire First	9	0	0	0	Steady	0	1.2	1,205	New
Heritage	1	0	0	0	Steady	0	0.0	10	New

== Electoral division results ==
=== Abbey ===
Abbey
Party	Candidate	Votes	%	±%
Liberal Democrats	Jamie Daniels	869	48.63	+9.78
Reform	Stuart Peter Phelps	322	18.02	N/A
Labour	Luke Alexander Cullen	254	14.21	–9.37
Conservative	Matt Stone	241	13.49	–15.95
Green	Aidan Samuel Oliver Brockell	101	5.65	–2.47
Majority		547	30.61	+21.20
Turnout		1,787		
Liberal Democrats win		Swing		

=== Albrighton ===
Albrighton
Party	Candidate	Votes	%	±%
Conservative	Nigel Peter Lumby	754	55.77	N/A
Reform	Gary Vernon	365	27.00	N/A
Labour	Moira Jane Harris	117	8.65	N/A
Liberal Democrats	Helen Louise Tadcastle	116	8.58	N/A
Majority		389	28.77	N/A
Turnout		1,352		
Conservative win		Swing		

=== Bagley ===
Bagley
Party	Candidate	Votes	%	±%
Liberal Democrats	Benedict John Alexander Jephcott	664	45.02	+17.44
Reform	David Gerrard Geran	332	22.51	N/A
Labour	David George Francis Findlay	221	14.98	–10.60
Conservative	Garry David Burchett	197	13.36	–15.46
Green	Naomi Ruth Yates	61	4.14	N/A
Majority		332	22.51	N/A
Turnout		1,475		
Liberal Democrats gain from Conservative		Swing		

=== Battlefield ===
Battlefield
Party	Candidate	Votes	%	±%
Reform	Harry Hancock-Davies	338	32.69	N/A
Liberal Democrats	Kate Fejfer	282	27.27	+19.07
Green	Sarah Louise Clayton	232	22.44	N/A
Conservative	Becky Wall	130	12.57	–47.79
Labour	John Howard Turnbull	52	5.03	–26.41
Majority		56	5.42	N/A
Turnout		1,034		
Reform gain from Conservative		Swing		

=== Bayston Hill ===
Bayston Hill
Party	Candidate	Votes	%	±%
Liberal Democrats	Teri Trickett	920	51.92	N/A
Labour	Alan John Pankhurst	412	23.25	N/A
Reform	Euan Ball	271	15.29	N/A
Conservative	Max Thomas	119	6.72	N/A
Green	Tony Burton	50	2.82	N/A
Majority		508	28.67	N/A
Liberal Democrats win (new seat)				

=== Belle Vue ===
Belle Vue
Party	Candidate	Votes	%	±%
Labour	Kate Halliday	829	55.71	–9.37
Reform	Norman James Brown	279	18.75	N/A
Conservative	Alexander George Phillips	151	10.15	–9.93
Liberal Democrats	Will Read	115	7.73	+2.56
Green	Alexandra Katherine Biggs	114	7.66	–2.02
Majority		550	36.96	–8.04
Turnout		1,488		
Labour hold		Swing		

=== Bicton Heath ===
Bicton Heath
Party	Candidate	Votes	%	±%
Liberal Democrats	Jon Tandy	677	47.08	N/A
Reform	Chris Lodge	355	24.69	N/A
Labour	Wynn Davies	176	12.24	N/A
Conservative	Robert Binks	173	12.03	N/A
Green	Giles St John Fancourt Bell	57	3.96	N/A
Majority		322	22.39	N/A
Turnout		1,438		
Liberal Democrats win (new seat)				

=== Bishop's Castle ===
Bishop's Castle
Party	Candidate	Votes	%	±%
Liberal Democrats	Ruth Margaret Houghton	1,012	70.03	–8.17
Reform	Christine Roberts	216	14.95	N/A
Conservative	Hilary Mary Luff	115	7.96	–6.28
Green	Linda Senior	61	4.22	–3.33
Labour	Steven John Barnbrook	41	2.84	N/A
Majority		796	55.09	–8.87
Turnout		1,445		
Liberal Democrats hold		Swing		

=== Bridgnorth Castle ===
Bridgnorth Castle
Party	Candidate	Votes	%	±%
Reform	Peter Husemann	454	31.95	N/A
Liberal Democrats	David Norman Cooper	331	23.29	N/A
Labour	Huw Morgan Rees	302	21.25	N/A
Conservative	Bethanie Lauren Stanford	290	20.41	N/A
Green	Clare Nash	44	3.10	N/A
Majority		123	8.66	N/A
Turnout		1,421		
Reform win (new seat)				

=== Bridgnorth East ===
Bridgnorth East
Party	Candidate	Votes	%	±%
Reform	Susan Elizabeth Eden	539	43.09	N/A
Liberal Democrats	Vanessa Naomi Voysey	250	19.98	N/A
Conservative	Christian James Lea	195	15.59	N/A
Shropshire First	James David Gittins	129	10.31	N/A
Labour	Gavin Goodall	55	4.40	N/A
Independent	Ian Wellings	46	3.68	N/A
Green	Susan Anne Mary Cunning	37	2.96	N/A
Majority		289	23.10	N/A
Turnout		1,251		
Reform win (new seat)				

=== Bridgnorth South and Alveley ===
Bridgnorth South and Alveley
Party	Candidate	Votes	%	±%
Liberal Democrats	Colin Taylor	508	41.10	N/A
Reform	Karen Michelle Webb-James	508	41.10	N/A
Conservative	Kieran James Chambers	173	14.00	N/A
Green	Robert Austin Cunning	24	1.94	N/A
Labour	Gail Marcia Waters	23	1.86	N/A
Majority		0	0.00	N/A
Turnout		1,236		
Liberal Democrats win (new seat)				

The result in this ward was tied, with the Liberal Democrat candidate winning a tie breaker.

=== Bridgnorth West and Tasley ===
Bridgnorth West and Tasley
Party	Candidate	Votes	%	±%
Independent	Rachel Elizabeth Connolly	383	32.18	N/A
Reform	Stuart Greaves	382	32.10	N/A
Liberal Democrats	Andrew John Sherrington	202	16.97	N/A
Conservative	Ed Gillams	181	15.21	N/A
Labour	Ann Marie Philip	27	2.27	N/A
Green	Robert Gordon Humphreys	15	1.26	N/A
Majority		1	0.08	N/A
Turnout		1,190		
Independent win (new seat)				

=== Broseley ===
Broseley
Party	Candidate	Votes	%	±%
Labour	Caroline Emma Bagnall	717	43.93	–11.61
Reform	Lee Ross	557	34.13	N/A
Conservative	Chris Tyler	146	8.95	–30.28
Shropshire First	Simon Christopher Harris	139	8.52	N/A
Green	Robert Holmquist	39	2.39	–2.84
Liberal Democrats	Jonathan Andrew Upton	34	2.08	N/A
Majority		160	9.80	–6.51
Turnout		1,632		
Labour hold		Swing		

=== Brown Clee ===
Brown Clee
Party	Candidate	Votes	%	±%
Reform	George James Hollyhead	581	38.55	N/A
Conservative	Dominic James Stanford	534	35.43	–21.96
Liberal Democrats	Richard Antony Fox	286	18.98	+7.53
Labour	Nicholas James Hickman	57	3.78	N/A
Green	Lucy Aphramor	49	3.25	–4.79
Majority		47	3.12	N/A
Turnout		1,507		
Reform gain from Conservative		Swing		

=== Burnell ===
Burnell
Party	Candidate	Votes	%	±%
Liberal Democrats	Chris Naylor	799	48.99	+25.73
Conservative	Daniel Orland Morris	514	31.51	–34.52
Reform	Michael John Watkins	259	15.88	N/A
Labour	Elizabeth Jayne Lee Casson	31	1.90	–8.81
Green	David Robert Crane	28	1.72	N/A
Majority		285	17.47	N/A
Turnout		1,631		
Liberal Democrats gain from Conservative		Swing		

=== Castlefields and Ditherington ===
Castlefields and Ditherington
Party	Candidate	Votes	%	±%
Labour	Alan Neil Mosley	522	51.63	–14.27
Reform	Jonathan Walmsley	225	22.26	+17.76
Green	Carlos Terol Marrero	87	8.61	–0.31
Liberal Democrats	Matthew David Hamilton Clark	65	6.43	+3.21
Conservative	David Richmond Turner	59	5.84	–11.62
Independent	Joe Elliott George Dyas	53	5.24	N/A
Majority		297	29.38	–19.06
Turnout		1,011		
Labour hold		Swing		

=== Cheswardine ===
Cheswardine
Party	Candidate	Votes	%	±%
Liberal Democrats	Neil Frederick Bentley	470	34.66	N/A
Reform	Andy Radford	455	33.55	N/A
Conservative	James Richard Charles Bentley	405	29.87	–39.64
Labour	Anne Piercy	26	1.92	N/A
Majority		15	1.11	N/A
Turnout		1,356		
Liberal Democrats gain from Conservative		Swing		

=== Chirbury and Worthen ===
Chirbury and Worthen
Party	Candidate	Votes	%	±%
Liberal Democrats	Heather Mary Kidd	1,014	70.96	–12.88
Reform	Christine Ward	263	18.40	N/A
Conservative	Ian Francis Peake	111	7.77	–8.39
Green	Hilary Wendt	21	1.47	N/A
Labour	Deborah Jayne Walthorne	20	1.40	N/A
Majority		751	52.55	–15.13
Turnout		1,429		
Liberal Democrats hold		Swing		

=== Claverley and Worfield ===
Claverley and Worfield
Party	Candidate	Votes	%	±%
Reform	Dawn Amanda Husemann	690	50.55	N/A
Conservative	Robert James Irvin	383	28.06	N/A
Liberal Democrats	Paul Anthony Pickerill	243	17.80	N/A
Green	Kim Laurette Fitzwarine-Smith	25	1.83	N/A
Labour	Heather Claire Thomas	24	1.76	N/A
Majority		307	22.49	N/A
Turnout		1,365		
Reform win (new seat)				

=== Clee ===
Clee
Party	Candidate	Votes	%	±%
Reform	Charles Stuart Shackerley-Bennett	506	35.86	N/A
Liberal Democrats	Stuart Nicholas Waite	462	32.74	–17.53
Conservative	Anthony Gerard Bevington	345	24.45	–18.70
Green	David Stuart Clifford Tomlinson	61	4.32	–2.26
Labour	Jane Elizabeth Hickman	37	2.62	N/A
Majority		44	3.12	N/A
Turnout		1,411		
Reform gain from Liberal Democrats		Swing		

=== Cleobury Mortimer ===
Cleobury Mortimer
Party	Candidate	Votes	%	±%
Reform	Pamela Christine Davies	429	34.51	N/A
Liberal Democrats	Ben Williams	408	32.82	N/A
Conservative	Gwilym Howard Leslie Butler	343	27.59	N/A
Green	John Crowe	44	3.54	N/A
Labour	Jonathan Cooper Shires	19	1.53	N/A
Majority		21	1.69	N/A
Turnout		1,243		
Reform win (new seat)				

=== Clun ===
Clun
Party	Candidate	Votes	%	±%
Liberal Democrats	Samuel James Walmsley	861	53.64	–1.45
Reform	Brian Stewart Jones	338	21.06	N/A
Conservative	Carol Anne Griffiths	305	19.00	–25.91
Green	Sara Anne MacLachlan	69	4.30	N/A
Labour	David Henchman	32	1.99	N/A
Majority		523	32.59	+22.41
Turnout		1,605		
Liberal Democrats hold		Swing		

=== Column and Sutton ===
Column and Sutton
Party	Candidate	Votes	%	±%
Labour	Rosemary Dartnall	459	34.10	N/A
Conservative	Freddie John Anderson	329	24.44	N/A
Reform	Maria Felton	316	23.48	N/A
Liberal Democrats	Jon Moore	169	12.56	N/A
Green	Diane Louise Monether	73	5.42	N/A
Majority		130	9.66	N/A
Turnout		1,346		
Labour win (new seat)				

=== Copthorne ===
Copthorne
Party	Candidate	Votes	%	±%
Liberal Democrats	Rob Wilson	913	53.74	–5.21
Reform	Gareth Bowles	298	17.54	N/A
Conservative	Jeff Anderson	266	15.66	–12.54
Labour	Harry Taylor	141	8.30	–4.56
Green	Christopher James Houlston	81	4.77	N/A
Majority		615	36.20	+5.45
Turnout		1,699		
Liberal Democrats hold		Swing		

=== Corvedale ===
Corvedale
Party	Candidate	Votes	%	±%
Conservative	Colin Andrew Stanford	741	43.92	–22.35
Reform	Claire Elizabeth Rowbotham	423	25.07	N/A
Liberal Democrats	David Gaukroger	344	20.39	N/A
Green	Neil John Taylor	127	7.53	–22.15
Labour	Simon Paul Morris	52	3.08	N/A
Majority		318	18.85	–17.74
Turnout		1,687		
Conservative hold		Swing		

=== Craven Arms ===
Craven Arms
Party	Candidate	Votes	%	±%
Liberal Democrats	Joshua Miles Dickin	538	39.88	N/A
Conservative	David William Evans	387	28.69	N/A
Reform	Stuart George Rowbotham	316	23.42	N/A
Green	Anne Winifred Swinnerton Dyer	69	5.11	N/A
Labour Co-op	George Adamson	39	2.89	N/A
Majority		151	11.19	N/A
Turnout		1,349		
Liberal Democrats win (new seat)				

=== Ellesmere Urban ===
Ellesmere Urban
Party	Candidate	Votes	%	±%
Liberal Democrats	Rosie Harriet Radford	467	40.93	+32.72
Reform	Paul Brewer	328	28.75	N/A
Conservative	Geoffrey Ian Elner	323	28.31	–23.44
Labour	Michael Waters	23	2.02	–38.02
Majority		139	12.18	N/A
Turnout		1,141		
Liberal Democrats gain from Conservative		Swing		

=== Harlescott ===
Harlescott
Party	Candidate	Votes	%	±%
Liberal Democrats	Rhys Gratton	340	40.09	+36.31
Reform	Gwendoline Laura Wellings	288	33.96	N/A
Labour Co-op	Elisabeth Anne Addams	136	16.04	–25.57
Conservative	Stan Wilkinson	49	5.78	–38.58
Green	Liz Evans	35	4.13	–5.22
Majority		52	6.13	N/A
Turnout		848		
Liberal Democrats gain from Conservative		Swing		

=== Highley ===
Highley
Party	Candidate	Votes	%	±%
Reform	Sharon Ann Ritchie-Simmons	537	42.62	N/A
Liberal Democrats	Mark Nicholas Williams	415	32.94	N/A
Conservative	Tom Quinn	235	18.65	–14.96
Shropshire First	Andrew Hancox	30	2.38	N/A
Labour	Timothy John Hughes	22	1.75	–11.65
Green	Jan Arriens	21	1.67	N/A
Majority		122	9.68	N/A
Turnout		1,260		
Reform gain from Independent		Swing		

=== Hodnet ===
Hodnet
Party	Candidate	Votes	%	±%
Reform	Donna Edmunds	406	36.12	N/A
Liberal Democrats	Roger Alan Hughes	358	31.85	+19.39
Conservative	Mark James Lewis Gilbert	313	27.85	–33.64
Labour	Christine Elizabeth Hart	47	4.18	N/A
Majority		48	4.27	N/A
Turnout		1,124		
Reform gain from Conservative		Swing		

As of 5 May 2025, Donna Edmunds sits as an independent having been suspended by Reform UK and subsequently leaving the party

=== Llanymynech ===
Llanymynech
Party	Candidate	Votes	%	±%
Liberal Democrats	Duncan Keith Borrowman	535	38.24	–0.45
Reform	Paul William Pritchard	502	35.88	N/A
Conservative	Vince Hunt	320	22.87	–25.68
Labour	Karon Jill Adamson	42	3.00	N/A
Majority		33	2.36	N/A
Turnout		1,399		
Liberal Democrats gain from Conservative		Swing		

=== Longden ===
Longden
Party	Candidate	Votes	%	±%
Liberal Democrats	Roger Arthur Evans	779	54.67	–12.91
Reform	Paul Rotheringham	330	23.16	N/A
Conservative	Emma Thomas	184	12.91	–12.51
Labour	Tom Stephen Alexander Doolan	71	4.98	–2.02
Green	Christine Anne Holding	61	4.28	N/A
Majority		449	31.51	–10.65
Turnout		1,425		
Liberal Democrats hold		Swing		

=== Loton ===
Loton
Party	Candidate	Votes	%	±%
Conservative	Ed Potter	659	44.95	–30.07
Reform	Stuart Tomlins	370	25.24	N/A
Liberal Democrats	Edward Timothy Stanley Swain	276	18.83	+12.58
Labour	Hannah Louise Taylor	97	6.62	–6.63
Green	Michelle Jane Sutton Jane	64	4.37	–2.69
Majority		289	19.71	–43.63
Turnout		1,466		
Conservative hold		Swing		

=== Ludlow East ===
Ludlow East
Party	Candidate	Votes	%	±%
Liberal Democrats	Beverley Ann Elaine Waite	451	42.51	–8.19
Reform	Michael Ian Day	331	31.20	N/A
Conservative	Julian Guy Rogers-Coltman	97	9.14	–22.29
Independent	Darren Childs	82	7.73	N/A
Green	David Anthony Currant	58	5.47	+0.85
Labour	Susan Walton	42	3.96	–9.29
Majority		120	11.31	–7.96
Turnout		1,061		
Liberal Democrats hold		Swing		

=== Ludlow North ===
Ludlow North
Party	Candidate	Votes	%	±%
Liberal Democrats	Andy Boddington	699	51.93	+0.88
Reform	Sara-Jane Ladums	334	24.81	N/A
Conservative	Sebastian Bowen	196	14.56	–11.90
Green	Linda Hale	70	5.20	–2.60
Labour	Taylor Jones	47	3.49	N/A
Majority		365	27.12	+2.53
Turnout		1,346		
Liberal Democrats hold		Swing		

=== Ludlow South ===
Ludlow South
Party	Candidate	Votes	%	±%
Liberal Democrats	Elizabeth Vivienne Parry	796	59.85	–5.58
Reform	Nigel Charles Roberts	367	27.59	N/A
Conservative	Peter Charles Webb	89	6.69	–20.69
Green	Antony David Lempert	58	4.36	–2.83
Labour	Stuart Neal	20	1.50	N/A
Majority		429	32.26	–5.79
Turnout		1,330		
Liberal Democrats hold		Swing		

=== Market Drayton East and Rural ===
Market Drayton East and Rural
Party	Candidate	Votes	%	±%
Liberal Democrats	Tom Dainty	502	41.32	N/A
Reform	Anthony Neville Graham Atkinson	422	34.73	N/A
Conservative	Roy Aldcroft	246	20.25	N/A
Labour	Kevin Francis Madden	45	3.70	N/A
Majority		80	6.58	N/A
Turnout		1,215		
Liberal Democrats win (new seat)				

=== Market Drayton North ===
Market Drayton North
Party	Candidate	Votes	%	±%
Liberal Democrats	Jeremy Stuart Blandford	466	44.85	N/A
Reform	Iana Mariam Jacobson	344	33.11	N/A
Conservative	Ian Charles Nellins	199	19.15	N/A
Labour	Imogen Grace Wilkes	30	2.89	N/A
Majority		122	11.74	
Turnout		1,039		
Liberal Democrats win (new seat)				

=== Market Drayton South ===
Market Drayton South
Party	Candidate	Votes	%	±%
Liberal Democrats	David James Minnery	444	39.54	N/A
Reform	Joseph Robertson	402	35.80	N/A
Conservative	Rupert Nicholas Adcock	213	18.97	N/A
Labour	Jane Easty	64	5.70	N/A
Majority		42	3.74	N/A
Turnout		1,123		
Liberal Democrats win (new seat)				

=== Meole ===
Meole
Party	Candidate	Votes	%	±%
Liberal Democrats	Bernie Bentick	814	57.61	+22.04
Reform	Lee David Gough	301	21.30	N/A
Labour	Edie Leake	127	8.99	–16.48
Conservative	Mike Owen	106	7.50	–23.57
Green	Peter John Gilbert	65	4.60	3.28
Majority		513	36.31	+31.81
Turnout		1,413		
Liberal Democrats hold		Swing		

=== Monkmoor ===
Monkmoor
Party	Candidate	Votes	%	±%
Liberal Democrats	Adam Fejfer	580	47.58	+13.38
Reform	Paul Felton	294	24.12	N/A
Labour	Pam Moseley	255	20.92	–22.43
Conservative	Tim Wall	54	4.43	–14.89
Green	Julia Louise Kaldewey	36	2.95	–0.19
Majority		286	23.46	N/A
Turnout		1,219		
Liberal Democrats gain from Labour		Swing		

=== Much Wenlock ===
Much Wenlock
Party	Candidate	Votes	%	±%
Conservative	Dan Thomas	844	50.78	–9.83
Liberal Democrats	Aleem Iqbal	388	23.35	+0.89
Reform	Stuart John Price	316	19.01	N/A
Labour	Lewis John Drake	63	3.79	N/A
Green	Catherine Humphreys	51	3.07	–13.86
Majority		456	27.44	–10.71
Turnout		1,662		
Conservative hold		Swing		

=== Oswestry North ===
Oswestry North
Party	Candidate	Votes	%	±%
Liberal Democrats	Wendy Rhiannon Owen	416	37.31	N/A
Reform	John Desmond Young	274	24.57	N/A
Green	Rose Olly	244	21.88	N/A
Conservative	David Osselton	110	9.87	N/A
Shropshire First	Barry Onions	50	4.48	N/A
Labour	Jack Thomas Stacey	21	1.88	N/A
Majority		142	12.74	N/A
Turnout		1,115		
Liberal Democrats win (new seat)				

=== Oswestry North East ===
Oswestry North East
Party	Candidate	Votes	%	±%
Liberal Democrats	James William Owen	376	42.34	N/A
Reform	Nikita Dart	224	25.23	N/A
Shropshire First	John William Price	115	12.95	N/A
Conservative	Chris Schofield	89	10.02	N/A
Green	Will Isherwood	65	7.32	N/A
Labour	Maureen Sandra Howell	19	2.14	N/A
Majority		152	17.12	N/A
Turnout		888		
Liberal Democrats win (new seat)				

=== Oswestry South ===
Oswestry South
Party	Candidate	Votes	%	±%
Green	Duncan Kerr	467	34.85	–20.83
Liberal Democrats	Grace Goodlad	445	33.21	N/A
Reform	Peter Neil Junor	222	16.57	N/A
Conservative	Les Maguire	158	11.79	–32.53
Labour	Rupert Boyle	24	1.79	N/A
Shropshire First	Matthew James Dunnie-Smith	24	1.79	N/A
Majority		22	1.64	–9.72
Turnout		1,340		
Green hold		Swing		

=== Oswestry South East ===
Oswestry South East
Party	Candidate	Votes	%	±%
Liberal Democrats	Mark Anthony Owen	318	42.34	N/A
Reform	Christine Pamela Owens	216	28.76	N/A
Conservative	Steve Mason	88	11.72	N/A
Independent	Martin Bennett	51	6.79	N/A
Green	Stephen James Froggatt	42	5.59	N/A
Labour	Charlie Brooke	36	4.79	N/A
Majority		102	13.58	N/A
Turnout		751		
Liberal Democrats win (new seat)				

=== Oteley and Reabrook ===
Oteley and Reabrook
Party	Candidate	Votes	%	±%
Liberal Democrats	Vicky Moore	467	39.48	N/A
Reform	Toby Cowell	332	28.06	N/A
Labour	Phil Gillam	243	20.54	N/A
Conservative	Rebecca Ann Nuttall	107	9.04	N/A
Green	Andrew John Charles Normand	34	2.87	N/A
Majority		135	11.41	N/A
Turnout		1,183		
Liberal Democrats win (new seat)				

=== Porthill ===
Porthill
Party	Candidate	Votes	%	±%
Green	Julian David Geoffrey Dean	716	47.51	–9.40
Liberal Democrats	Graham James Tate	255	16.92	–1.20
Reform	Philip Leslie Bailey	253	16.79	N/A
Conservative	Charles Gerald Orlando Bridgeman	160	10.62	–6.60
Labour	Mark Austin Hayward	123	8.16	–0.41
Majority		461	30.59	–8.20
Turnout		1,507		
Green hold		Swing		

=== Prees ===
Prees
Party	Candidate	Votes	%	±%
Liberal Democrats	Malcolm Eric Myles-Hook	563	42.59	+19.06
Reform	Tom Monaco	497	37.59	N/A
Conservative	Kate Hague	236	17.85	–58.62
Labour	Michael Southall	26	1.97	N/A
Majority		66	5.00	N/A
Turnout		1,322	40.67	
Liberal Democrats gain from Conservative		Swing		

=== Quarry and Coton Hill ===
Quarry and Coton Hill
Party	Candidate	Votes	%	±%
Liberal Democrats	Alex Wagner	616	56.77	+15.75
Reform	Tony Paterson	186	17.14	N/A
Labour	Bob Saunders	133	12.26	–9.89
Conservative	Peter Michael Adams	81	7.47	–19.15
Green	Bibbs Mavis Christine Tomaszewski	69	6.36	–3.95
Majority		430	39.63	+25.33
Turnout		1,085	32.83	
Liberal Democrats hold		Swing		

=== Radbrook ===
Radbrook
Party	Candidate	Votes	%	±%
Green	Christopher John Lemon	759	51.04	–0.74
Reform	Michael John Avery	313	21.05	N/A
Conservative	Saiful Hussain Chowdhury	224	15.06	–19.21
Liberal Democrats	Richard Paul Murphy	100	6.72	N/A
Labour	Rhiannon Jarman	91	6.12	–7.83
Majority		446	29.99	–12.48
Turnout		1,487	41.84	
Green hold		Swing		

=== Rea Valley ===
Rea Valley
Party	Candidate	Votes	%	±%
Conservative	Nick Hignett	491	40.35	–31.00
Reform	Lee Mathew Jones	372	30.57	N/A
Liberal Democrats	Wendy Beavan Horton	159	13.06	+5.18
Labour	Esther Smith	114	9.37	–1.98
Green	Emma Catherine Mary Bullard	81	6.66	–2.76
Majority		119	9.78	–50.22
Turnout		1,217	34.79	
Conservative hold		Swing		

=== Ruyton and Baschurch ===
Ruyton and Baschurch
Party	Candidate	Votes	%	±%
Liberal Democrats	Robert John Jones	769	49.45	+8.49
Conservative	Tamarin Bibow	360	23.15	–24.37
Reform	Samuel James Ansloos	353	22.70	N/A
Green	Maria Ann Churm	45	2.89	N/A
Labour	Paul David Hollington	28	1.80	–9.72
Majority		409	26.30	N/A
Turnout		1,555	41.97	
Liberal Democrats gain from Conservative		Swing		

=== Selattyn and Gobowen ===
Selattyn and Gobowen
Party	Candidate	Votes	%	±%
Green	Craig David Emery	488	38.36	N/A
Liberal Democrats	Jay Moore	382	30.03	N/A
Reform	Johnny Blaze	241	18.95	N/A
Conservative	Robert John Macey	144	11.32	N/A
Labour	Christine Carolyn Madden	17	1.34	N/A
Majority		106	8.33	N/A
Turnout		1,272	37.69	
Green win (new seat)				

=== Severn Valley ===
Severn Valley
Party	Candidate	Votes	%	±%
Conservative	Susan Ann Coleman	523	34.23	–25.31
Labour	Jim Healey	406	26.57	–3.46
Reform	Peter James White	395	25.85	N/A
Liberal Democrats	Nathaniel Jacob Green	152	9.95	+6.96
Green	John Cherry	52	3.40	–4.04
Majority		117	7.66	–21.85
Turnout		1,528	48.25	
Conservative hold		Swing		

=== Shawbury ===
Shawbury
Party	Candidate	Votes	%	±%
Liberal Democrats	Alison Williams	418	42.96	+3.33
Reform	Carol Cox	285	29.29	N/A
Conservative	Simon Paul Anderson Jones	244	25.08	–35.29
Labour	Mark Russell Patterson	26	2.67	N/A
Majority		133	17.88	N/A
Turnout		973	32.54	
Liberal Democrats gain from Conservative		Swing		

=== Shifnal North ===
Shifnal North
Party	Candidate	Votes	%	±%
Reform	Thomas Clayton	371	34.16	N/A
Independent	Kevin David Turley	335	30.85	–26.48
Conservative	William Edward King	212	19.52	–23.15
Labour	Nick Banford	119	10.96	N/A
Liberal Democrats	Kevin John Booker	49	4.51	N/A
Majority		36	3.31	N/A
Turnout		1,086	29.25	
Reform gain from Independent		Swing		

=== Shifnal Rural ===
Shifnal Rural
Party	Candidate	Votes	%	±%
Reform	Elizabeth Delphine Barker	400	39.29	N/A
Conservative	Lindsey Karen Sharratt	356	34.97	N/A
Liberal Democrats	Stewart John Edmondson	100	9.82	N/A
Labour	Heather Jane Button	86	8.45	N/A
Independent	John Michael Horne	76	7.47	N/A
Majority		44	4.32	N/A
Turnout		1,018	29.78	
Reform win (new seat)				

=== Shifnal South ===
Shifnal South
Party	Candidate	Votes	%	±%
Conservative	Edward Francis Bird	336	30.05	N/A
Reform	John Delaney	331	29.61	N/A
Independent	Roger Edward Cox	226	20.21	N/A
Labour	Jan Coulson	158	14.13	N/A
Liberal Democrats	Charlotte Burgess-Bate	67	5.99	N/A
Majority		5	0.44	N/A
Turnout		1,118	31.07	
Conservative win (new seat)				

=== St Martin's ===
St Martin's (2 seats)
Party	Candidate	Votes	%	±%
Reform	Carl Michael Rowley	700	30.26	N/A
Reform	Brian Richard Evans	626	27.06	N/A
Liberal Democrats	Clare Valerie Geary	526	22.74	N/A
Shropshire First	Stephen Davenport	453	19.58	N/A
Liberal Democrats	Clive Alfred Geary	428	18.50	N/A
Green	Paul Herbert	369	15.95	N/A
Green	Sophie Ann Hughes-Saunier	368	15.91	N/A
Conservative	Mark Jones	284	12.28	N/A
Shropshire First	Maggie Rowlands	211	9.12	N/A
Conservative	Ian Peter Lander	171	7.39	N/A
Labour	Maggie Rowlands	124	5.36	N/A
Labour	Natalie Rowlands	124	5.36	N/A
Turnout		2,313	34.83	
Reform win (new seat)				
Reform win (new seat)				

=== St Oswald ===
St Oswald
Party	Candidate	Votes	%	±%
Liberal Democrats	Andy Davis	462	31.47	N/A
Conservative	Joyce Bernadette Barrow	454	30.93	−27.64
Reform	Tom Sanderson	355	24.18	N/A
Green	Joshua James Cockburn	168	11.44	−29.99
Labour	Keith Reginald Hudson	29	1.98	N/A
Majority		8	0.54	N/A
Turnout		1,468	39.97	
Liberal Democrats gain from Conservative		Swing		

=== Stottesdon, Kinlet and Hopton Wafers ===
Stottesdon, Kinlet and Hopton Wafers
Party	Candidate	Votes	%	±%
Reform	David Sidney Arthur Davies	589	42.96	N/A
Conservative	Anita Jayne Rose	492	35.89	N/A
Liberal Democrats	Julie Marion Bushell	194	14.15	N/A
Green	John Rimington	53	3.87	N/A
Labour	Gillian Westcar	43	3.14	N/A
Majority		97	7.07	N/A
Turnout		1,371	44.20	
Reform win (new seat)				

=== Sundorne and Old Heath ===
Sundorne and Old Heath
Party	Candidate	Votes	%	±%
Reform	Mandy Duncan	358	39.04	N/A
Labour	Kev Pardy	357	38.93	N/A
Liberal Democrats	Ed Wagner	72	7.85	N/A
Conservative	Jeremy George Nuttall	71	7.74	N/A
Green	Judith Mary Savage	49	5.34	N/A
Heritage	Ian Goddard	10	1.09	N/A
Majority		1	0.11	N/A
Turnout		917	26.34	
Reform win (new seat)				

=== Tern ===
Tern
Party	Candidate	Votes	%	±%
Reform	Brendan Mallon	528	34.62	N/A
Liberal Democrats	Mandie Lee	393	25.77	N/A
Conservative	William Rowland	377	24.72	–32.10
Labour Co-op	Alan William Herbert	169	11.08	–10.31
Green	Oscar McEntee	58	3.80	–6.11
Majority		135	8.85	N/A
Turnout		1,525	43.08	
Reform gain from Conservative		Swing		

=== The Meres ===
The Meres
Party	Candidate	Votes	%	±%
Liberal Democrats	Sarah Jane Marston	746	51.45	+2.12
Reform	Peter Griffiths	406	28.00	N/A
Conservative	Chris Parker	248	17.10	–33.57
Green	Stephen Christopher Boulding	32	2.21	N/A
Labour	Michael Thomas Crawshaw	18	1.24	N/A
Majority		340	23.45	N/A
Turnout		1,450	45.72	
Liberal Democrats gain from Conservative		Swing		

=== The Strettons ===
The Strettons
Party	Candidate	Votes	%	±%
Liberal Democrats	Mark Edward Ernest Morris	695	34.61	N/A
Independent	Andrew Ian Munro	694	34.56	N/A
Conservative	Steph Jones	255	12.70	N/A
Reform	James Henry Summers	205	10.21	N/A
Labour Co-op	Shan Flynn	103	5.13	N/A
Green	Stephen Hale	56	2.79	N/A
Majority		1	0.05	N/A
Turnout		2,008	51.31	
Liberal Democrats win (new seat)				

=== Underdale ===
Underdale
Party	Candidate	Votes	%	±%
Liberal Democrats	David Vasmer	535	48.33	+2.53
Reform	Martin Edward Leslie Oakley	264	23.85	N/A
Labour	James David Turnbull	176	15.90	–15.92
Conservative	Kenneth Michael Vine	77	6.96	–10.19
Green	Barry Hutchinson	55	4.97	–0.18
Majority		271	24.48	+10.42
Turnout		1,107	32.73	
Liberal Democrats hold		Swing		

=== Wem ===
Wem (2 seats)
Party	Candidate	Votes	%	±%
Liberal Democrats	Alan John Holford	1,044	42.84	+5.01
Liberal Democrats	Gary Groves	887	36.40	N/A
Reform	Jeremy Austin Farrow	709	29.09	N/A
Conservative	Peter Broomhall	631	25.89	−13.59
Reform	Mark Anthony Thompson	546	22.40	N/A
Conservative	Nathan Graham Edward Lea	458	18.79	−17.31
Green	Timothy Morgan Dawes	168	6.89	N/A
Labour	Barbara Anne Cotterell	93	3.82	N/A
Labour	John George Britton	83	3.41	N/A
Turnout		2,437	36.07	
Liberal Democrats gain from Independent		Swing		
Liberal Democrats gain from Conservative		Swing		

=== Whitchurch North ===
Whitchurch North
Party	Candidate	Votes	%	±%
Liberal Democrats	Andy Hall	717	53.95	N/A
Conservative	Tom Biggins	319	24.00	N/A
Reform	Satish Chappiti	254	19.11	N/A
Labour	Yvonne Jane Jones	39	2.93	N/A
Majority		398	29.95	N/A
Turnout		1,329		
Liberal Democrats win (new seat)				

=== Whitchurch South ===
Whitchurch South
Party	Candidate	Votes	%	±%
Liberal Democrats	Greg Ebbs	392	37.73	+0.69
Reform	Justin Halford Reynolds	383	36.86	N/A
Conservative	Paul Anthony Donald Wynn	222	21.37	–41.59
Labour	Kevin Leonard Carty	42	4.04	N/A
Majority		9	0.87	N/A
Turnout		1,039		
Liberal Democrats gain from Conservative		Swing		

=== Whitchurch West ===
Whitchurch West
Party	Candidate	Votes	%	±%
Liberal Democrats	Sho Abdul	381	38.06	N/A
Reform	Rob Paxman	285	28.47	N/A
Conservative	Peggy Mullock	267	26.67	N/A
Labour	Richard Douglas Stewart	68	6.79	N/A
Majority		96	9.59	N/A
Turnout		1,001		
Liberal Democrats win (new seat)				

=== Whittington ===
Whittington
Party	Candidate	Votes	%	±%
Liberal Democrats	David Walker	591	47.78	–0.85
Reform	Elizabeth Peers	370	29.91	N/A
Conservative	Frank Reginald Davis	159	12.85	–38.52
Shropshire First	Verity Dean	54	4.37	N/A
Green	Simon Charles Greaves	33	2.67	N/A
Labour	Elaine Barratt	21	1.70	N/A
Independent	Greg Hickman	9	0.73	N/A
Majority		221	17.87	N/A
Turnout		1,237		
Liberal Democrats gain from Conservative		Swing		

== 2025-2029 by-elections ==
=== Affiliation changes ===
Three days after the election on 4 May 2025, Donna Edmunds was suspended by Reform UK pending an investigation. On 6 May 2025, she left the party and now sits as an independent.
