= Bowbrook =

Village in Shropshire, England

Coordinates: 52.706°N 2.799°W

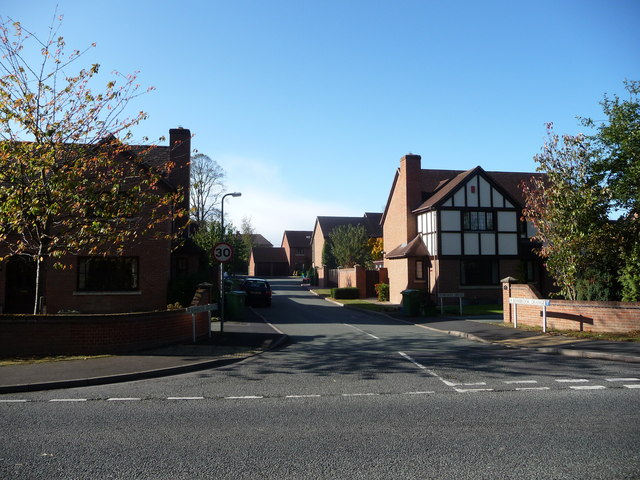
- The entrance to Bowbrook Grange

- Location within Shropshire
- OS grid reference: SJ460123
- Civil parish: Shrewsbury
- Unitary authority: Shropshire
- Ceremonial county: Shropshire
- Region: West Midlands
- Country: England
- Sovereign state: United Kingdom
- Post town: SHREWSBURY
- Postcode district: SY3
- Dialling code: 01743
- Police: West Mercia
- Fire: Shropshire
- Ambulance: West Midlands
- UK Parliament: Shrewsbury

Bowbrook is a village in Shropshire, England, now a western suburb of Shrewsbury.
