= Rose Paterson =

British business executive (1956–2020)

The Honourable Rose Paterson
- Born: Rose Emily Ridley; 13 August 1956; Northumberland, England
- Died: 24 June 2020 (aged 63); Ellesmere, Shropshire, England
- Education: New Hall, Cambridge
- Title: Chairman, Aintree Racecourse
- Term: 2014–2020
- Spouse: Owen Paterson (m. 1980)
- Children: 3
- Parent(s): The 4th Viscount Ridley; Lady Anne Katharine Gabrielle Lumley
- Relatives: Matt Ridley (brother)

Rose Emily Paterson (née Ridley; 13 August 1956 – 24 June 2020) was a British business executive, fundraiser, and the chairman of Aintree Racecourse.

== Early life ==
Rose Emily Paterson was born on 13 August 1956 in Northumberland. She was the daughter of the 4th Viscount Ridley and Lady Anne Lumley (the daughter of the 11th Earl of Scarbrough). Her great-grandfather was Sir Edwin Lutyens, through his daughter Ursula, and her uncle was Nicholas Ridley, a prominent Conservative cabinet minister in the Thatcher government. Her brother, Matt Ridley, is the 5th Viscount Ridley, and she had two other siblings.

They lived near Seaton Burn at the family-owned Blagdon Estate. She was educated at Westfield School in Newcastle upon Tyne and West Heath Girls' School in Sevenoaks. As a schoolgirl, she ran a book (acted as a bookmaker) on horse racing, and said "I made quite a killing". After school she took a gap year, and then read history at New Hall, Cambridge, and attended an art history course in Venice.

== Career ==
She worked for Sotheby's auction house, provided advice and valuations on artworks. Following her husband's election as an MP in 1997, she was her husband's Shropshire-based personal assistant and office manager.

In 2014, she was appointed chairman of Aintree Racecourse, and stood down from working for her husband in 2015. She had been a racecourse committee director since 2005. In 2014, she became the Jockey Club Racecourses' first female chairman, succeeding The 4th Baron Daresbury.

She was appointed a member of the board of stewards at the Jockey Club, owners of Aintree, in 2019.

== Personal life ==
In 1980, she married businessman and future Conservative cabinet minister Owen Paterson, son of Alfred Dobell Paterson and Cynthia M. Owen. They had two sons and a daughter. They lived at Shellbrook Hill in Ellesmere, Shropshire, a grade II listed building since May 1953, and Hillsborough Castle when Owen was Secretary of State for Northern Ireland.

Paterson contracted COVID-19 in 2020. She was found dead in woods near her home that June; West Mercia Police treated her death as "unexplained", and it was not thought that any third party was involved. She was 63.

Her death was later ruled by a coroner to be suicide. The Rose Paterson Trust was founded in her honour.
