= Helen Morgan (politician) =

British politician (born 1975)

Helen Morgan MP
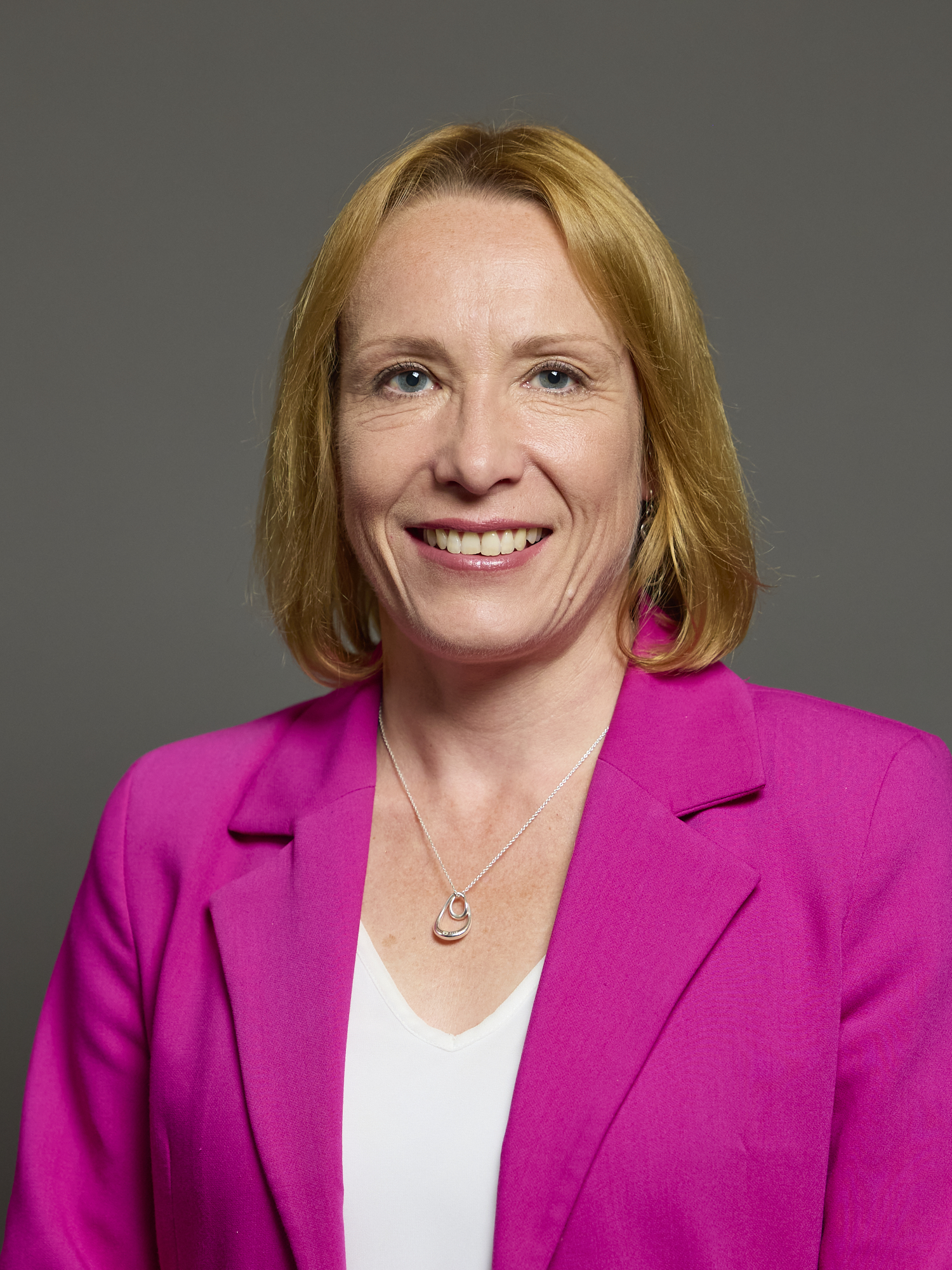
- Official portrait, 2024

Member of Parliament for North Shropshire
- Incumbent
- Assumed office 16 December 2021
- Preceded by: Owen Paterson
- Majority: 15,311 (30.9%)

Liberal Democrat portfolios
- 2022–2024: Levelling Up, Housing, Communities and Local Government
- 2024–present: Health and Social Care

Personal details
- Born: Helen Margaret Lilian Halcrow; 9 April 1975 (age 51) Nottingham, Nottinghamshire, England
- Party: Liberal Democrats
- Spouse: Robert Morgan (m. 2003)
- Children: 1
- Education: Trinity College, Cambridge
- Website: www.helenmorgan.org.uk

Helen Margaret Lilian Morgan (née Halcrow; born 9 April 1975) is a British Liberal Democrat politician and chartered accountant who has been Member of Parliament (MP) for North Shropshire since 2021.

== Early life and career ==
Morgan was born Helen Margaret Lilian Halcrow on 9 April 1975 in Nottingham to John and Susan Halcrow. She grew up in Stone, Staffordshire. She attended Alleyne's High School in Stone before reading history at Trinity College, Cambridge, graduating in 1996.

Morgan is a chartered accountant, and prior to her election to Parliament worked as financial controller for a real estate business based in North Shropshire. Her previous experience included posts as head of margin forecasting at British Gas, head of financial reporting at Centrica, and audit manager at KPMG.

Morgan began her career in politics as a parish councillor. At the 2019 general election, she stood as the Liberal Democrat candidate in North Shropshire, coming third with 10 per cent of the vote behind the incumbent Conservative MP Owen Paterson and the Labour Party candidate.

On 6 May 2021, Morgan was a Liberal Democrat candidate in the 2021 Shropshire Council election for the unitary division of The Meres, narrowly losing to the Conservative candidate by 23 votes.

== Parliamentary career ==
Morgan was selected as the Liberal Democrat candidate for the 2021 North Shropshire by-election on 16 November 2021. The by-election was triggered after its incumbent MP Owen Paterson announced on 4 November that he would be stepping down after Prime Minister Boris Johnson indicated he would no longer prevent his suspension from parliament after being found by a watchdog to have breached rules on lobbying. The government had earlier issued a three line whip to Conservative MPs to support an amendment to prevent Paterson's sanction and overhaul the watchdog but the following day reversed its position. Paterson had repeatedly lobbied on behalf of healthcare company Randox and food company Lynn's Country Foods. For the former, he worked as a paid consultant for at least £100,000 per year, and lobbied to secure government COVID-19 contracts worth nearly £600 million without competitive bidding.

At the by-election, Morgan was elected to Parliament as MP for North Shropshire with 47.2% of the vote and a majority of 5,925. In her victory speech, Morgan attacked Prime Minister Boris Johnson and the government as being "run on lies and bluster", highlighting the Westminster Christmas parties controversy and the Downing Street refurbishment controversy as examples of this, and stated that her priorities would be on improving healthcare locally and supporting the farming community in the constituency.

One of her first actions as an MP was writing to Sajid Javid, the Secretary of State for Health and Social Care, asking for a review into ambulance waiting times in Shropshire. Local ambulance services had featured as a prominent issue during the by-election campaign. In response to the letter, Minister of State for Health Edward Argar stated that there had been no impact assessment on the closures of ambulance stations in the area.

Morgan was appointed Liberal Democrat Spokesperson for Levelling up, Housing and Communities and Liberal Democrat Spokesperson for Local Government on 11 July 2022.

She is a supporter of reopening Baschurch railway station, which was closed in the 1960s due to the Beeching cuts.

At the 2024 general election, Morgan was re-elected as MP for North Shropshire with an increased vote share of 52.9 per cent and an increased majority of 15,311.

== Personal life ==
Morgan has run half-marathons to raise money for numerous charities and has volunteered as a trustee for a local nursery. She married Robert Morgan in 2003, and the couple have a son. The family live in Harmer Hill, having moved to North Shropshire in 2014. She lists her recreations as "walking, running, gardening, reading, family".

Parliament of the United Kingdom
Preceded by Owen Paterson	Member of Parliament for North Shropshire; 2021–present	Incumbent
