= Martin Fletcher =

British newspaper journalist (born 1956)

Martin Fletcher (born 7 July 1956) is former associate editor and former foreign editor of The Times in London. He was named feature writer of the year in the 2015 British Press Awards.

== Biography ==
Fletcher was educated at Uppingham School, the University of Edinburgh and the University of Pennsylvania. He has worked for The Times as a political journalist, as Washington Bureau Chief, as Belfast correspondent, and as Europe correspondent based in Brussels. He was foreign editor from 2002 and 2006. He subsequently worked as a roving correspondent specialising mostly in foreign affairs, reporting from many countries including Syria, Iran, Iraq, Egypt, Libya, Haiti, Zimbabwe, Somalia, China and the Democratic Republic of Congo, before becoming a freelance journalist.

He was shortlisted for feature writer of the year in the British Press Awards of 2016, foreign journalist of the year in the British Press Awards of 2007 and 2010, travel writer of the year in the British Press Awards of 2018, best print journalist in the Foreign Press Association Awards of 2009 and best environment story in the Foreign Press Association Awards of 2014.

He now writes articles for publications including the New Statesman, The Times, The Daily Telegraph, the Financial Times, Radio Times, Prospect, The Mail on Sunday, Wanderlust and Conde Nast Traveller.

He is also the author of The Good Caff Guide (Wildwood House), Almost Heaven: Travels Through the Backwoods of America (Little Brown) and Silver Linings: Travels around Northern Ireland (Little Brown).

Almost Heaven was shortlisted for the Thomas Cook Travel Book Award 2000.
