= Owen Paterson =

British politician (born 1956)

The Right Honourable Owen Paterson
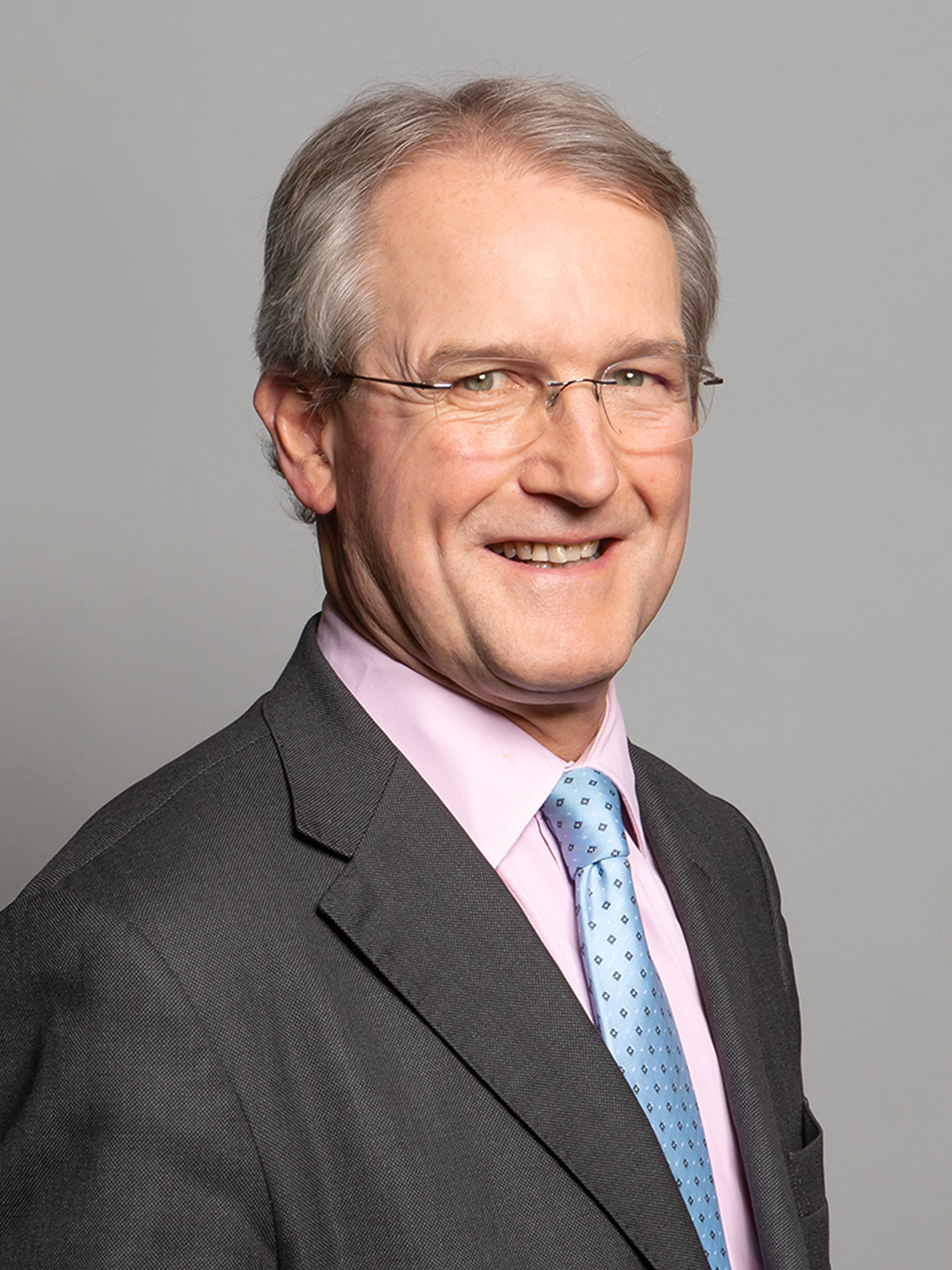
- Official portrait, 2020

Secretary of State for Environment, Food and Rural Affairs
- In office 4 September 2012 – 14 July 2014
- Prime Minister: David Cameron
- Preceded by: Caroline Spelman
- Succeeded by: Liz Truss

Secretary of State for Northern Ireland
- In office 12 May 2010 – 4 September 2012
- Prime Minister: David Cameron
- Preceded by: Shaun Woodward
- Succeeded by: Theresa Villiers

Shadow Secretary of State for Northern Ireland
- In office 2 July 2007 – 11 May 2010
- Leader: David Cameron
- Preceded by: David Lidington
- Succeeded by: Shaun Woodward

Member of Parliament for North Shropshire
- In office 1 May 1997 – 5 November 2021
- Preceded by: John Biffen
- Succeeded by: Helen Morgan

Personal details
- Born: Owen William Paterson; 24 June 1956 (age 70) Whitchurch, Shropshire, England
- Party: Conservative
- Spouse: Rose Ridley (m. 1980; died 2020)
- Children: 3
- Education: Radley College
- Alma mater: Corpus Christi College, Cambridge

Owen William Paterson (born 24 June 1956) is a British former politician who served as Secretary of State for Northern Ireland from 2010 to 2012 and Secretary of State for Environment, Food and Rural Affairs from 2012 to 2014 under Prime Minister David Cameron. A member of the Conservative Party, he served as Member of Parliament (MP) for North Shropshire from 1997 until his resignation in 2021. Paterson was also the President of the Northern Ireland Conservatives.

Paterson was appointed to the Shadow Cabinet of David Cameron in 2007 as Shadow Secretary of State for Northern Ireland. During the formation of the Coalition Government in 2010, he was appointed to the Cabinet as Northern Ireland Secretary, where he remained until being moved to Environment Secretary in 2012. He was dismissed as Environment Secretary by Prime Minister David Cameron as part of the 2014 Cabinet reshuffle, and was replaced by Liz Truss. After returning to the backbenches, Paterson became a leading supporter of Brexit as a member of the European Research Group (ERG).

Paterson resigned from the House of Commons on 5 November 2021 amid controversy surrounding a report by the Parliamentary Commissioner for Standards that found that he had broken paid advocacy rules.

== Early life and career ==
Paterson was born in Whitchurch, Shropshire, and grew up on his family's farm. He attended Abberley Hall School and Radley College, before reading History at Corpus Christi College, Cambridge. He then went on to the National Leathersellers College (now the Institute for Creative Leather Technologies at the University of Northampton).

He joined his family business, British Leather Company, in 1979, becoming Sales Director in 1983 and managing director from 1993 to 1999. He was President of COTANCE (the Confederation of National Associations of Tanners and Dressers of the European Community), the European Tanners Confederation, from 1996 to 1998. He was a Director of Parsons and Sons leather company in Halesowen in the 1990s. Paterson is a Freeman of the City of London and a Liveryman of the Leathersellers' Company.

At the 1992 general election, Paterson contested Wrexham, but the incumbent Labour MP extended his lead with a 2.4% swing.

== Parliamentary career ==
Paterson was first elected as the Member of Parliament for North Shropshire at the 1997 general election with a majority of 2,195 and increased his majority at each subsequent election, up to 22,949 in 2019.

He served on several committees, including the Welsh Affairs Committee (1997–2001), the European Standing Committee (1998–2001), and the Agriculture Committee (2000–01). Paterson is a supporter of the Royal Irish Regiment, which has been based in his constituency at Tern Hill.

=== Early front bench posts ===
From 2001 to 2003, Paterson served as Parliamentary Private Secretary to the Leader of the Opposition. He was Shadow Agriculture, Fisheries and Food Minister from 2003 to 2005. As agriculture spokesman he campaigned for the dairy industry. He visited Michigan, Maryland and Washington to discuss bovine TB policy, writing extensively on the issue facing the UK. He travelled all over the North Atlantic to produce a Green paper on Fisheries. Paterson joined the crew of the Kiroan, one of the few remaining trawlers out of Fleetwood, Lancashire, to view the fishing practices that have been created by the EU's Common Fisheries Policy. He wrote the Green paper "Consultation on a National Policy on Fisheries Management in U.K. Waters".

Paterson served as Shadow Minister for Transport from 2005 to 2007. Whilst he was Shadow Minister for Roads, Paterson researched relevant best practice and the latest ideas from Europe and North America.

=== Shadow Secretary of State for Northern Ireland ===
Paterson was appointed Shadow Secretary of State for Northern Ireland on 2 July 2007.

He negotiated an agreement between the Conservative Party and the Ulster Unionist Party to re-establish the traditional links between the two parties, which had been broken in 1972. This included running joint Conservative/UUP candidates for the 2009 European and 2010 general elections.

News of this alliance was praised by several Conservatives, including Iain Dale and ConservativeHome. The renewed alliance caused the UUP's only MP, Sylvia Hermon, to resign from the UUP. Lady Hermon retained her seat against the Ulster Conservatives and Unionists in the 2010 Westminster election. The UUP lost seats at the assembly elections the following year.

=== Secretary of State for Northern Ireland ===
Paterson was appointed as Secretary of State for Northern Ireland in the Coalition Government on 12 May 2010. He was created a Privy Councillor on 13 May 2010.

One of his first tasks was overseeing the publication and delivery of the Saville Report on the events of Bloody Sunday in January 1972, which led to an apology by the Prime Minister David Cameron. He worked with the Treasury to deliver his promise of a consultation on the devolution of the power to reduce the rate of corporation tax to Stormont. Paterson stated that "Rebalancing and rebuilding the economy is critical to the future prosperity of Northern Ireland and it is one of the Government's key priorities for Northern Ireland." He has been outspoken on the issue of integrated education in Northern Ireland. Currently 95% of Northern Ireland pupils attend a segregated school. Paterson believes segregated education is not working; in October 2010, he said: “there's a school in Belfast with no pupils and there's a school in Belfast with more staff than pupils. That's just a criminal waste of public money. We cannot go on bearing the cost of segregation and I don't see why the British taxpayer should continue to subsidise segregation."

Paterson was the first cabinet member to publicly oppose the Coalition Government's Marriage (Same Sex Couples) Bill, defying David Cameron and ministerial convention.

=== Secretary of State for Environment, Food and Rural Affairs ===
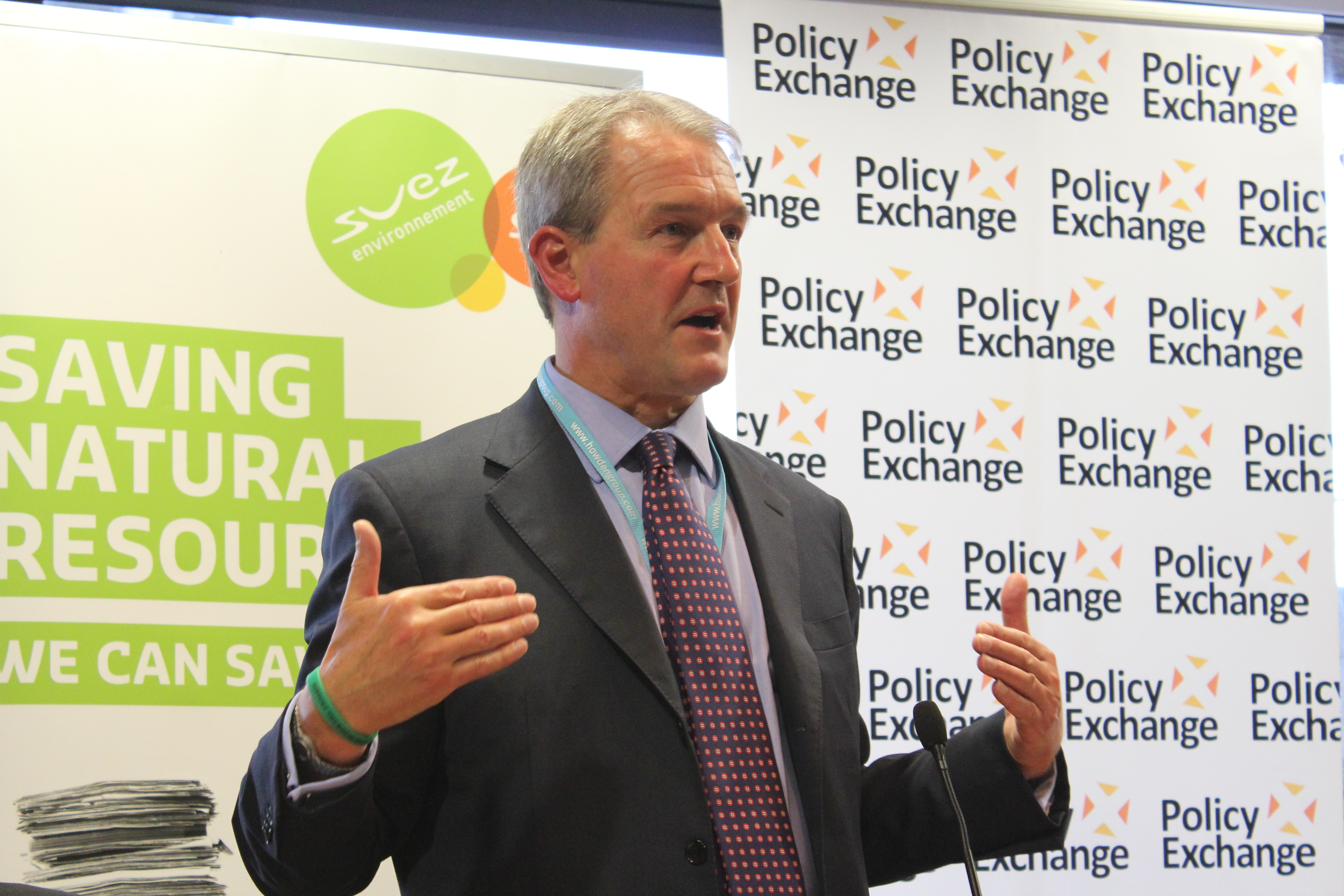
Paterson speaking in 2013

Paterson was appointed Secretary of State for Environment, Food and Rural Affairs in September 2012.

Despite his voting record "moderately for" laws to stop climate change, he is a climate change sceptic, and did not accept scientist David MacKay's offer of a briefing on climate change science. Prior to being appointed at DEFRA, he described wind turbines as "ridiculous" and "useless" and called for the end of "Soviet" subsidies that supported their development. As an alternative to wind power, he supported the use of fracking. At the 2013 Conservative party conference, he argued that there were advantages to climate change such as fewer deaths caused by cold weather and the ability to grow food further North. During his time in office, Paterson cut funding for climate change adaptation by approximately 40%. In 2014, the outgoing Environment Agency chair Chris Smith said that flood defence budget cuts had left the agency underfunded and hampered its ability to prevent and respond to flooding in the UK. When asked in a 2013 BBC interview about the alleged failure of a badger cull he had been responsible for, Paterson replied that "the badgers have moved the goalposts."

Paterson voted and spoke strongly against the fox hunting ban, in one speech likening supporters of the bill to Nazis. Coming as Justine Greening was removed as Transport Secretary, Paterson's appointment was widely considered to be part of a move back towards the expansion of Heathrow Airport, given his support for aviation. Paterson stated on BBC Radio 4's Any Questions? in June 2013 that "the temperature has not changed in the last 17 years ...".

Paterson is known as a strong supporter of genetically modified food (GM) technology. Even before he acceded to the Department for Environment, Food and Rural Affairs (DEFRA) in September 2012, he spoke at length in June of the same year at the Rothamsted Research facility and invited GMO innovators to take root in the UK. In December 2012, he labelled consumer opposition to the technology as a "complete nonsense". In October 2013, he branded opponents of the development of golden rice enriched with vitamin A "wicked".

Paterson was mentioned by journalist Benedict Brogan as a possible replacement on the European Commission when the term of Baroness Ashton expired. Paterson was one of three MPs to leave the cabinet as part of the re-shuffle on 15 July 2014, and was succeeded by Liz Truss as Environment Secretary. His departure was widely attributed to his botched handling of the summer floods and the badger cull. Paterson praises Britain's shale gas reserves as "one unexpected and potentially huge windfall." The Guardian reported in December 2014 that Paterson had spoken the previous October at a meeting of the London Swinton Group, which opposes non-white immigration and calls for the return of capital punishment.

== Views on the European Union ==
Retiring to the backbenches Paterson, long known for his Euroscepticism, supported the successful Leave.EU campaign. Throughout the campaign he was an active voice, setting out the reasons in his constituency for a decision to go it alone. On 26 June 2016, he spoke about his long friendship with colleague Sir Bill Cash MP, who has shared his ambition for Brexit. Earlier in the year, he spoke at an international forum outlining his vision for Britain outside the Union.

In 2015, Paterson joined John Redwood to found internal pressure group Conservatives for Britain, which took pride of place at the party conference in Manchester pledging on the fringe to strive for independence from European interventionism; it formed the backbone of the Conservative effort for Leave. "If there are individuals in the cabinet who are not happy with the deal, they should be allowed to campaign", Paterson told The Daily Telegraph. He continued to be critical of David Cameron's attempts to negotiate a settlement with the European Union over net migration figures, an issue that featured highly in the referendum campaign. Following Paterson's return to the backbenches he remained an outspoken critic of the European Union, and was on the political advisory board of pro-hard Brexit advocacy group Leave Means Leave.

In 2014, Paterson established UK 2020, an independent centre-right think tank, to develop policies to address challenging and complex public policy areas. In his role as chairman, he delivered a number of speeches and written op-eds in favour of GM crops, and against the European Union and "exaggerated" climate change forecasts. He announced in October 2019 that UK 2020 would be shut down.

Paterson was also a subscribed supporter of the Conservative pro-Brexit European Research Group.

== Advocacy and breach of Commons rules ==
Paterson first became involved with the healthcare company Randox, based in Northern Ireland, whilst he was Shadow Northern Ireland Secretary before 2010. Contact continued when he became a minister and was campaigning for corporation tax to be devolved in Northern Ireland. In 2015, he began working as a part-time consultant for Randox, with the Advisory Committee on Business Appointments being advised at the time that the role "may involve discussions with ministers". In 2019, Paterson earned £8,333 a month for a monthly commitment of 16 hours as a consultant for Randox. In March 2020, Randox was awarded a £133 million contract from the Department of Health and Social Care to produce testing kits (at a cost of £49 each) during the coronavirus pandemic, without any other firms being given the opportunity to bid for the work. in April 2020, Paterson represented Randox in a call with James Bethell, the minister responsible for awarding contracts to the private sector during the pandemic. The government was later unable to find any minutes of the meeting, which the Commons Speaker noted would be expected to occur in any meeting between a minister and a business. A further £347 million contract was awarded to Randox six months later without other companies being able to bid. Paterson also receives £12,000 for 24 hours work per year from Lynn's Country Foods Ltd, a Northern Ireland-based processor and distributor of sausages.

In October 2021, Paterson was found by the Parliamentary Commissioner for Standards to have breached paid advocacy rules for making three approaches to the Food Standards Agency and four approaches to the Department for International Development in relation to Randox and seven approaches to the Food Standards Agency in relation to Lynn's Country Foods. The Commissioner said Paterson had "repeatedly used his privileged position to benefit two companies for whom he was a paid consultant, and that this has brought the house into disrepute" and that "no previous case of paid advocacy has seen so many breaches or such a clear pattern of behaviour in failing to separate private and public interests". The Commons Select Committee on Standards recommended Paterson be suspended from the Commons for 30 sitting days. Paterson said: "The process I have been subjected to does not comply with natural justice. I am not guilty and a fair process would exonerate me."

A motion to carry out the recommendations of the Committee and suspend Paterson was due to be voted on by Parliament. Had suspension been approved, a recall petition would have been triggered in his constituency. An amendment to the motion was put forward by Conservative backbencher Andrea Leadsom to delay consideration of Paterson's suspension and to set up a new committee to investigate the disciplinary process for MPs. Such an amendment was noted in the press as being unprecedented. The government of Boris Johnson supported the amendment and issued a three-line whip. The amendment passed 250–232 with the support of Sammy Wilson of the DUP and Paterson himself, with 13 Conservative MPs voting against, and 97 absent or abstaining. The duly amended motion was then passed 248–221. The amended motion:

1. noted concerns about potential defects in the standards system;
2. resolved to appoint a Select Committee chaired by John Whittingdale with four other Conservative MPs, and with 3 Labour and 1 SNP MPs, to give recommendations on whether to give MPs a right of appeal similar to employees, whether to reconsider the case against Paterson, and how the standards rules should be revised to be "compatible with natural justice".

It became apparent that the opposition parties were not willing to participate in the new Select Committee. Faced with heavy criticism in the media and from MPs of all parties, the government reversed its position and announced that a vote would still take place on whether Paterson should be suspended. Following that decision, on 5 November 2021, Paterson announced his decision to resign from Parliament, forestalling any further votes and the possibility of a recall petition, and making a by-election inevitable. After a further debate on 16 November, Parliament passed a motion accepting the findings of the original report that recommended Paterson be suspended. The by-election was held on 16 December 2021, when the previously ultra-safe seat of North Shropshire was won by the Liberal Democrat candidate Helen Morgan.

Paterson took legal action against the British government in the European Court of Human Rights (ECHR), claiming that the parliamentary investigation into his conduct was unfair. In September 2024, the ECHR rejected his claim.

== Overseas visits ==
In January 2019, it emerged that Paterson had received £39,000 of funding for overseas trips from the thinktank UK 2020, of which he was the chairman and sole director. Trips funded by the thinktank included speaking at two rightwing thinktanks in the US, the Competitive Enterprise Institute and The Heritage Foundation. MPs are required to declare the source of funds for any overseas visit worth more than £300. Although Paterson had declared the trips, the Labour Party called for a parliamentary investigation: shadow Cabinet Office minister Jon Trickett wrote to the Parliamentary Commissioner for Standards, Kathryn Stone, "Paterson appears to be both the recipient of donations and the controlling intermediary through which they are paid". He said without information on the true source of donations, "the register of members' interests is unable to fulfil its vital purpose". Paterson stated that "All the expenses incurred on these trips have been declared according to parliamentary rules", but has not confirmed the original source of the funding. In October 2019, he announced the body's forthcoming shutdown.

== Personal life ==
Paterson married Rose Ridley, the daughter of Matthew White Ridley, 4th Viscount Ridley, and sister of Matt Ridley, in 1980. They have two sons, Felix and Ned, and a daughter, Evie. He lives near Ellesmere, north Shropshire, and also has a house in Drôme, France.

Paterson is a horse rider and racer, and has ridden across Turkmenistan and Mongolia. His daughter, Evie, is an eventer who won the British Junior Eventing Championships in 2008, aged 16. In January 2018, Paterson fell from a horse while riding and broke three vertebrae in his back.

Paterson's wife Rose died on 24 June 2020, her husband's birthday. Her body was found in the early hours of the morning in woodland at their country house, Shellbrook Hill. The coroner later ruled her death to be suicide by hanging.

== Honours ==
Paterson was sworn in as a member of Her Majesty's Most Honourable Privy Council in 2010 upon his appointment to the British Cabinet as the Secretary of State for Northern Ireland. This gave him the honorific title "The Right Honourable" for life.

Parliament of the United Kingdom
Preceded by John Biffen	Member of Parliament for North Shropshire; 1997–2021	Succeeded by Helen Morgan
Political offices
Preceded by John Whittingdale	Parliamentary Private Secretary to the Leader of the Opposition; 2001–2003	Succeeded by Graham Brady
Preceded by David Lidington	Shadow Secretary of State for Northern Ireland; 2007–2010	Succeeded by Shaun Woodward
Preceded by Shaun Woodward	Secretary of State for Northern Ireland; 2010–2012	Succeeded by Theresa Villiers
Preceded by Caroline Spelman	Secretary of State for Environment, Food and Rural Affairs; 2012–2014	Succeeded by Liz Truss
