= 2021 Shropshire Council election =

2021 UK local government election

- 6 May 2021

All 74 seats to Shropshire Council 38 seats needed for a majority
	First party	Second party
Party	Conservative	Liberal Democrats
Seats won	43	14
Seat change	▼6	▲2
Popular vote	51,442	25,123
Percentage	44.8%	21.9%
Swing	▼4.0%	▲1.8%
	Third party	Fourth party
Party	Labour	Green
Seats won	9	4
Seat change	▲1	▲3
Popular vote	20,691	10,869
Percentage	18.0%	9.5%
Swing	▲1.7%	▲2.0%
- Map showing the results of the 2021 elections. Striped divisions have mixed representation.
Council control before election
Conservative
Council control after election
Conservative

The 2021 Shropshire Council election took place on 6 May 2021 as part of the 2021 United Kingdom local elections. All 74 councillors were elected from 63 electoral divisions which return either one, two or three councillors each by first-past-the-post voting for a four-year term of office.

== Summary ==
=== Election result ===
2021 Shropshire Council election
Party	Candidates	Seats	Gains	Losses	Net gain/loss	Seats %	Votes %	Votes	+/−
Conservative	74	43	3	9	▼6	58.1	44.8	51,442	–4.0
Liberal Democrats	58	14	3	1	▲2	18.9	21.9	25,123	+1.8
Labour	41	9	2	1	▲1	12.2	18.0	20,691	+1.7
Green	41	4	3	0	▲3	5.4	9.5	10,869	+2.0
Independent	14	4	2	1	▲1	5.4	5.6	6,470	+1.1
UKIP	2	0	0	0	Steady	0.0	0.2	218	–0.8
Reform	2	0	0	0	Steady	0.0	0.1	97	New
Health Concern	0	0	0	1	▼1	0.0	0.0	0	–1.3

Though the Conservatives maintained their majority on the council, there was a major shock result that saw the incumbent Conservative leader of the council, Peter Nutting, lose his seat to a Liberal Democrat challenger. He was replaced as leader of the council by Conservative Lezley Picton at the AGM held later that month.

== Council composition ==
Following the last election in 2017, the composition of the council was:

↓
49	12	8	3	1	1
Conservative	Lib Dem	Labour	I	G	H

After the election, the composition of the council was:

↓
43	14	9	4	4
Conservative	Lib Dem	Labour	I	G

I - Independent
G - Green Party
H - Health Concern

== Ward results ==
=== Abbey ===
Abbey (1 seat)
Party	Candidate	Votes	%	±%
Liberal Democrats	Mary Gwendoline Davies	636	38.9	−16.7
Conservative	Ian Stuart Burgess	482	29.4	+5.2
Labour	Martyn Gordon Harris	386	23.6	+7.9
Green	Helen Louise Campbell	133	8.1	New
Majority		154	9.4	−21.9
Turnout		1,637		
Liberal Democrats hold		Swing	-11.0	

=== Albrighton ===
Albrighton (1 uncontested seat)
Party	Candidate	Votes	%	±%
Conservative	Nigel Peter Lumby	Uncontested		
Conservative hold				

=== Alveley and Claverley ===
Alveley and Claverley (1 seat)
Party	Candidate	Votes	%	±%
Conservative	Elliott Liam Lynch	859	69.3	−5.9
Liberal Democrats	Vanessa Naomi Voysey	275	22.2	−2.5
Green	Kim Laurette Fitzwarine-Smith	105	8.5	New
Majority		584	47.1	−3.4
Turnout		1,239		
Conservative hold		Swing	-1.7	

=== Bagley ===
Bagley (1 seat)
Party	Candidate	Votes	%	±%
Conservative	Garry David Burchett	419	28.8	−11.1
Liberal Democrats	Benedict John Alexander Jephcott	401	27.6	−2.5
Labour	Paul David Hollington	372	25.6	−4.4
Independent	Peter David Day	262	18.0	New
Majority		18	1.2	−8.7
Turnout		1,454		
Conservative hold		Swing	-4.3	

=== Battlefield ===
Battlefield (1 seat)
Party	Candidate	Votes	%	±%
Conservative	Dean Spencer Joseph*	574	60.4	+3.0
Labour Co-op	Frankie Rickford	299	31.4	−2.9
Liberal Democrats	Helen Louise Tedcastle	78	8.2	New
Majority		275	28.9	+5.9
Turnout		951		
Conservative hold		Swing	+3.0	

=== Bayston Hill, Column & Sutton ===
Bayston Hill, Column & Sutton (3 seats)
Party	Candidate	Votes	%	±%
Labour	John Edward Clarke*	2,160	50.6	−5.0
Labour	Rosemary Lucy Winifred Dartnall	1,724	40.4	−0.9
Labour	Anthony Donald Parsons*	1,712	40.1	−3.6
Conservative	Janet Ann Childs	1,439	33.7	+2.2
Conservative	James Oliver Louis Katz	1,269	29.8	+0.8
Conservative	Simon Alastair Orr	1,246	29.2	+2.5
Green	Emma Catherine Mary Bullard	613	14.4	+6.7
Liberal Democrats	William Coles	415	9.7	−1.7
Green	April Elizabeth Evans	409	9.6	+3.0
Green	Diane Louise Monether	329	7.7	N/A
Liberal Democrats	Ivana Novotna	187	4.4	N/A
Liberal Democrats	Robert Charles Lea	164	3.8	N/A
Turnout		4,285		
Labour hold		Swing	-3.6	
Labour hold		Swing	-0.9	
Labour hold		Swing	-3.1	

=== Belle Vue ===
Belle Vue (1 seat)
Party	Candidate	Votes	%	±%
Labour	Mary Kate Halliday	995	65.1	+22.1
Conservative	Saiful Chowdary	307	20.1	−8.2
Green	Sara Mai	148	9.7	+5.2
Liberal Democrats	Byron Grainger-Jones	79	5.2	−23.1
Majority		688	45.0	+30.3
Turnout		1,529		
Labour hold		Swing	+15.2	

=== Bishop’s Castle ===
Bishop’s Castle (1 seat)
Party	Candidate	Votes	%	±%
Liberal Democrats	Ruth Margaret Houghton	1,087	78.2	+4.6
Conservative	David Richmond Turner	198	14.2	−6.7
Green	Linda Mary Senior	105	7.55	New
Majority		889	64.0	+11.3
Turnout		1,390		
Liberal Democrats hold		Swing	+5.7	

=== Bowbrook ===
Bowbrook (1 seat)
Party	Candidate	Votes	%	±%
Liberal Democrats	Alex Wagner	1,001	62.2	+46.1
Conservative	Arlinda Ballcaj	322	20.0	−48.7
Labour	Shay Corrigan	238	14.8	New
Reform	Joe Elliot George Dyas	48	3.0	New
Majority		679	42.2	N/A
Turnout		1,609		
Liberal Democrats gain from Conservative		Swing	+47.4	

=== Bridgnorth East & Astley Abbotts ===
Bridgnorth East & Astley Abbotts (2 seats)
Party	Candidate	Votes	%	±%
Conservative	Kirstie Hurst-Knight	892	45.4	−2.5
Conservative	Christian James Lea	847	43.2	−12.5
Labour	Arlie Chetter	608	31.0	+2.6
Labour	Alexa Louise Buffey	415	21.1	N/A
No Label	Stephen Anthony Robbins	295	15.0	N/A
Liberal Democrats	Nicola Jayne Cooper	238	12.1	−10.6
Liberal Democrats	George Harry William Edwards	153	7.8	−13.8
Green	Simon Charles Greaves	129	6.6	N/A
Turnout		1,969		
Conservative hold		Swing	-2.6	
Conservative hold		Swing	-16.8	

=== Bridgnorth West and Tasley ===
Bridgnorth West and Tasley (2 seats)
Party	Candidate	Votes	%	±%
Labour	Julia Buckley	1,321	55.0	+38.3
Conservative	Leslie John Paul Winwood*	920	38.3	−20.5
Conservative	Jonathan James Holland	711	29.6	−17.1
Labour	Rachel Elizabeth Connolly	669	27.9	N/A
Liberal Democrats	David Norman Cooper	336	14.0	−13.4
Liberal Democrats	Richard Douglas Stilwell	282	11.8	−12.8
Green	Susan Anne Mary Cunning	70	2.9	N/A
Green	Robert Austin Cunning	60	2.5	N/A
Turnout		2,412		
Labour gain from Conservative		Swing	+27.7	
Conservative hold		Swing	-24.2	

=== Broseley ===
Broseley (1 seat)
Party	Candidate	Votes	%	±%
Labour	Caroline Emma Bagnall	882	55.5	+16.1
Conservative	Simon Christopher Harris*	623	39.2	−21.4
Green	Clare Nash	83	5.2	New
Majority		259	16.3	N/A
Turnout		1,588		
Labour gain from Conservative		Swing	+18.8	

=== Brown Clee ===
Brown Clee (1 seat)
Party	Candidate	Votes	%	±%
Conservative	Robert Stuart Tindall*	742	57.39	−22.38
Independent	Linda Jean Jackson	299	23.12	
Liberal Democrats	Richard Antony Fox	148	11.45	−8.78
Green	Lucy Christina Aphamor	104	8.04	
Majority		443	34.27	−25.27
Turnout		1,293		
Conservative hold		Swing		

=== Burnell ===
Burnell (1 seat)
Party	Candidate	Votes	%	±%
Conservative	Dan Morris*	1,110	66.03	+16.93
Liberal Democrats	Kate King	391	23.26	−23.93
Labour	Phil Norton	180	10.71	
Majority		713	42.77	+40.86
Turnout		1,681		
Conservative hold		Swing		

=== Castlefields and Ditherington ===
Castlefields and Ditherington (1 seat)
Party	Candidate	Votes	%	±%
Labour	Alan Neil Mosley*	717	65.90	+8.30
Conservative	David Huw Llwelyn Roberts	190	17.46	+1.88
Green	Peter John Gilbert	97	8.92	+3.90
Reform	Peter Charles Moore	49	4.50	
Liberal Democrats	Matthew David Hamilton Clark	35	3.22	
Majority		527	48.44	−10.18
Turnout		1.088		
Labour hold		Swing		

=== Cheswardine ===
Cheswardine (1 Seat)
Party	Candidate	Votes	%	±%
Conservative	Rob Gittins*	725	69.51	−6.50
Independent	Tim Beckett	318	30.49	
Majority		407	39.02	−13.00
Turnout		1,043		
Conservative hold		Swing		

=== Chirbury & Worthen ===
Chirbury & Worthen (1 seat)
Party	Candidate	Votes	%	±%
Liberal Democrats	Heather Mary Kidd*	1,069	83.84	+6.09
Conservative	Anthony Gerard Bevington	206	16.16	−6.09
Majority		863	67.68	+12.18
Turnout		1,275		
Liberal Democrats hold		Swing		

=== Church Stretton & Craven Arms ===
Church Stretton & Craven Arms (2 seats)
Party	Candidate	Votes	%	±%
Conservative	David William Evans*	1,363	44.82	−6.33
Conservative	Hilary Mary Luff	1,175	38.64	−13.94
Liberal Democrats	Mark Edward Ernest Morris	983	32.32	+5.18
Liberal Democrats	Alan Graham Jolley	909	29.89	+6.21
Green	Stephen Charles Hale	541	17.79	+4.34
Green	Hilary Raborg Houchin Wendt	482	15.85	+2.93
Turnout		3,057		
Conservative hold		Swing		
Conservative hold		Swing		

=== Clee ===
Clee (1 seat)
Party	Candidate	Votes	%	±%
Liberal Democrats	Richard Mark Huffer*	756	50.27	−10.72
Conservative	Anita Jayne Rose	649	43.15	+4.14
Green	David Stuart Clifford Thomlinson	99	6.58	
Majority		107	7.12	−14.86
Turnout		1,504		
Liberal Democrats hold		Swing		

=== Cleobury Mortimer ===
Cleobury Mortimer (2 seats)
Party	Candidate	Votes	%	±%
Conservative	Gwilym Howard Leslie Butler*	1,374	64.48	−0.50
Conservative	Simon Richard Harris	1,007	47.25	N/A
Liberal Democrats	Zoe Griffin	436	20.46	+8.18
Labour	John Mayers Rogers	327	15.34	+0.17
Green	Janet Catherine Humphreys	260	12.20	N/A
Green	John Charles Jeremy Crowe	209	9.81	N/A
Liberal Democrats	Andrew John Sherrington	141	6.62	−2.58
Turnout		2,146		
Conservative hold		Swing		
Conservative gain from Health Concern		Swing		

=== Clun ===
Clun (1 seat)
Party	Candidate	Votes	%	±%
Liberal Democrats	Nigel John Hartin*	985	55.09	−0.77
Conservative	Jack Limond	803	44.91	+0.77
Majority		182	10.18	−1.54
Turnout		1,788		
Liberal Democrats hold		Swing		

=== Copthorne ===
Copthorne (1 seat)
Party	Candidate	Votes	%	±%
Liberal Democrats	Rob Wilson	995	58.95	+35.58
Conservative	Peter Anthony Nutting*	476	28.20	−31.65
Labour	Ian James Matthews	217	12.86	
Majority		519	30.75	N/A
Turnout		1,688		
Liberal Democrats gain from Conservative		Swing		

=== Corvedale ===
Corvedale (1 seat)
Party	Candidate	Votes	%	±%
Conservative	Cecilia Mary Anne Motley*	998	66.27	−14.13
Green	Anne Winifred Swinnerton Dyer	447	29.68	
UKIP	Charles Shackerley-Bennett	61	4.05	
Majority		551	36.59	−43.81
Turnout		1,506		
Conservative hold		Swing		

=== Ellesmere Urban ===
Ellesmere Urban (1 seat)
Party	Candidate	Votes	%	±%
Conservative	Geoff Elner	517	51.75	−15.69
Labour	Alison Mary Davismes	400	40.04	
Liberal Democrats	Rod Keyes	82	8.21	−24.35
Majority		117	11.71	−23.17
Turnout		999		
Conservative hold		Swing		

=== Gobowen, Selattyn & Weston Rhyn ===
Gobowen, Selattyn & Weston Rhyn (2 seats)
Party	Candidate	Votes	%	±%
Conservative	Robert John Macey*	813	46.46	−3.30
Conservative	Thomas Mark Jones*	791	45.20	+0.14
Labour	Craig David Emery	634	36.23	+12.31
Liberal Democrats	Clare Valerie Geary	346	19.77	+2.96
Liberal Democrats	Clive Alfred Geary	219	12.51	N/A
Turnout		1,761		
Conservative hold		Swing		
Conservative hold		Swing		

=== Harlescott ===
Harlescott (1 seat)
Party	Candidate	Votes	%	±%
Conservative	Jeff Anderson	370	44.36	+10.82
Labour	Lisa Roberts	347	41.61	−15.53
Green	Matt Galliers	78	9.35	
Liberal Democrats	Artur Fejfer	39	4.68	
Majority		23	2.75	N/A
Turnout		834		
Conservative gain from Labour		Swing		

=== Highley ===
Highley (1 seat)
Party	Candidate	Votes	%	±%
Independent	David Tremellen*	451	53.00	+9.87
Conservative	Naomi Denise Waterson	286	33.61	+5.13
Labour	Charlotte Emily Round	114	13.40	−3.77
Majority		165	19.39	+4.74
Turnout		851		
Independent hold		Swing		

=== Hodnet ===
Hodnet (1 seat)
Party	Candidate	Votes	%	±%
Conservative	Paul Michael Gillan	597	61.48	−20.54
No Label	Karen Dale Calder*	253	26.06	
Liberal Democrats	Sarah Jane Marston	121	12.46	
Majority		344	35.42	
Turnout		971		
Conservative hold		Swing		

Karen Calder was previously elected as a Conservative.

=== Llanymynech ===
Llanymynech
Party	Candidate	Votes	%	±%
Conservative	Vince Hunt	601	48.55	−13.52
Liberal Democrats	Dan Widdon	479	38.69	+23.80
No Label	John Martin Jones	158	12.76	
Majority		122	9.86	−29.18
Turnout		1,238		
Conservative hold		Swing		

=== Longden ===
Longden (1 seat)
Party	Candidate	Votes	%	±%
Liberal Democrats	Roger Arthur Evans*	1,082	67.58	+6.38
Conservative	Owain Bryan Llywellyn Roberts	407	25.42	−9.34
Labour	Tom Stephen Alexander Doolan	112	7.00	
Majority		675	42.16	+15.72
Turnout		1,601		
Liberal Democrats hold		Swing		

=== Loton ===
Loton (1 seat)
Party	Candidate	Votes	%	±%
Conservative	Edward Alan Potter*	1,105	75.02	+0.45
Labour	Wynn Davies	172	11.68	
Green	Michelle Jane Sutton Jones	104	7.06	−2.39
Liberal Democrats	Lisa Michelle Walton	92	6.25	−9.73
Majority		933	63.34	+4.75
Turnout		1,473		
Conservative hold		Swing		

=== Ludlow East ===
Ludlow East (1 seat)
Party	Candidate	Votes	%	±%
Liberal Democrats	Tracey Huffer*	505	50.70	−13.50
Conservative	James Anthony Durnall	313	31.43	+9.18
Labour	Colin Eric James Sheward	132	13.25	−0.29
Green	Neil John Taylor	46	4.62	
Majority		192	19.27	−22.68
Turnout		996		
Liberal Democrats hold		Swing		

=== Ludlow North ===
Ludlow North (1 seat)
Party	Candidate	Votes	%	±%
Liberal Democrats	Andy Boddington*	681	51.05	−17.84
Conservative	Thomas Ian Scott Bell	353	26.46	+3.19
Independent	Graeme Perks	196	14.69	
Green	Linda Margaret Hale	104	7.80	+3.65
Majority		328	24.59	−44.30
Turnout		1,334		
Liberal Democrats hold		Swing		

=== Ludlow South ===
Ludlow South (1 seat)
Party	Candidate	Votes	%	±%
Liberal Democrats	Elizabeth Vivienne Parry*	901	65.43	−0.38
Conservative	Josh Boughton	377	27.38	+0.43
Green	Anthony David Lempert	99	7.19	
Majority		524	38.05	−0.81
Turnout		1,377		
Liberal Democrats hold		Swing		

=== Market Drayton East ===
Market Drayton East (1 seat)
Party	Candidate	Votes	%	±%
Conservative	Roy Aldcroft*	772	58.26	−14.97
Independent	Geoff Chevins	361	27.25	
Labour	Charles Henry Warren Love	192	14.49	−12.28
Majority		411	31.01	−15.45
Turnout		1,325		
Conservative hold		Swing		

=== Market Drayton West ===
Market Drayton West (2 seats)
Party	Candidate	Votes	%	±%
Conservative	Ian Charles Nellins	751	39.28	−10.63
Independent	David James Minnery*	701	36.66	−13.25
Conservative	Mark Joseph Whittle	659	34.47	−15.14
Independent	Roger Alan Hughes*	619	32.37	−17.24
Labour	Rob Bentley	393	20.55	−7.50
Turnout		1,938		
Conservative hold		Swing		
Independent gain from Conservative		Swing		

David Minnery and Roger Hughes were previously elected as Conservatives.

=== Meole ===
Meole (1 seat)
Party	Candidate	Votes	%	±%
Liberal Democrats	Bernie Bentick	546	35.57	+23.47
Conservative	Gwen Burgess	477	31.07	−24.36
Labour	Philip Nigel Adams	391	25.47	−2.01
Green	Chris Davenport	121	7.88	+2.88
Majority		69	4.50	N/A
Turnout		1,535		
Liberal Democrats gain from Conservative		Swing		

=== Monkmoor ===
Monkmoor (1 seat)
Party	Candidate	Votes	%	±%
Labour	Pam Moseley*	468	43.35	−27.80
Liberal Democrats	Slawomir Adam Fejefer	370	34.20	
Conservative	Patricia Burchett	209	19.32	−−9.53
Green	Jeremy Mark Brown	34	3.14	
Majority		98	9.15	−33.15
Turnout		1,082		
Labour hold		Swing		

=== Much Wenlock ===
Much Wenlock (1 seat)
Party	Candidate	Votes	%	±%
Conservative	Dan Thomas	931	60.61	
Liberal Democrats	Imogen Grace Fawcett	345	22.46	
Green	Mike Atherton	260	16.93	
Majority		586	38.15	N/A
Turnout		1,536		
Conservative hold				

At the previous election, the Conservative candidate was elected unopposed.

=== Oswestry East ===
Oswestry East (2 seats
Party	Candidate	Votes	%	±%
Conservative	John William Price*	889	50.68	+5.29
Conservative	Chris Schofield	667	38.03	+2.73
Green	Jay Moore	501	28.56	+11.87
Green	Olly Rose	446	25.43	+10.61
Labour	Graeme Roger Currie	324	18.47	+0.09
Liberal Democrats	Lee Kelvin Bennett	76	4.33	+0.25
Liberal Democrats	Romer Wilfred Hoseason	70	3.99	−1.67
Turnout		1,769		
Conservative hold		Swing		
Conservative hold		Swing		

=== Oswestry South ===
Oswestry South (1 seat)
Party	Candidate	Votes	%	±%
Green	Duncan Alistair Kerr	760	55.68	+8.03
Conservative	David Paul Milner*	605	44.32	−8.03
Majority		155	11.36	N/A
Turnout		1,365		
Green gain from Conservative		Swing		

=== Oswestry West ===
Oswestry West (1 seat)
Party	Candidate	Votes	%	±%
Green	Mike Isherwood	548	53.67	+6.92
Conservative	Les Maguire	367	35.95	−10.80
Labour	Neil John Sanderson	106	10.38	
Majority		181	17.72	N/A
Turnout		1,021		
Green gain from Conservative		Swing		

=== Porthill ===
Porthill (1 seat)
Party	Candidate	Votes	%	±%
Green	Julian David Geoffrey Dean*	1,021	56.91	+15.22
Liberal Democrats	Graham James Tate	325	18.12	−8.98
Conservative	William John Rowland	309	17.22	−13.95
Labour	Anwen Margaret Davies	139	7.75	
Majority		696	38.79	+24.24
Turnout		1,794		
Green hold		Swing		

=== Prees ===
Prees (1 seat)
Party	Candidate	Votes	%	±%
Conservative	Paul Anthony Donald Wynn*	991	76.47	+14.34
Liberal Democrats	Julie Marion Bushell	305	23.53	
Majority		686	52.94	+28.68
Turnout		1,296		
Conservative hold		Swing		

=== Quarry and Coton Hill ===
Quarry and Coton Hill (1 seat)
Party	Candidate	Votes	%	±%
Liberal Democrats	Nat Green*	532	40.92	−15.44
Conservative	Robin John Hooper	346	26.62	−5.48
Labour	Paul Forrest	288	22.15	
Green	Huw Richard Wystan Peach	134	10.31	
Majority		186	14.30	−9.96
Turnout		1,300		
Liberal Democrats hold		Swing		

=== Radbrook ===
Radbrook (1 seat)
Party	Candidate	Votes	%	±%
Green	Julia Louse Evans	1,032	51.78	+37.00
Conservative	Susan Ann Coleman	683	34.27	−24.35
Labour	Kevin Dovaston	278	13.95	
Majority		349	17.51	N/A
Turnout		1,993		
Green gain from Conservative		Swing		

=== Rea Valley ===
Rea Valley (1 seat)
Party	Candidate	Votes	%	±%
Conservative	Nick Hignett*	924	71.35	+16.12
Labour Co-op	John Olaf Lewis	147	11.35	
Green	Catherine Elizabeth Girvan	122	9.42	+3.51
Liberal Democrats	Nicholas Woodforde Deane	102	7.88	−30.98
Majority		777	60.00	+43.63
Turnout		1,295		
Conservative hold		Swing		

=== Ruyton & Baschurch ===
Ruyton & Baschurch (1 seat)
Party	Candidate	Votes	%	±%
Conservative	Nick Bardsley*	652	47.52	−26.12
Liberal Democrats	Robert John Jones	562	40.96	+35.77
Labour	David Michael Sharpe	158	11.52	−2.84
Majority		90	6.56	−52.73
Turnout		1,372		
Conservative hold		Swing		

=== Severn Valley ===
Severn Valley
Party	Candidate	Votes	%	±%
Conservative	Claire Margaret Wild*	1,136	59.54	−20.47
Labour	Jim Healey	573	30.03	
Green	Tim Dawes	142	7.44	−3.11
Liberal Democrats	Erwin Franciscus Cornelius van der Stap	57	2.99	−6.45
Majority		563	29.51	−39.95
Turnout		1,908		
Conservative hold		Swing		

=== Shawbury ===
Shawbury (1 seat)
Party	Candidate	Votes	%	±%
Conservative	Simon Paul Anderson Jones*	783	60.37	−16.09
Liberal Democrats	Adrian Howard Brown	514	39.63	
Majority		269	20.74	−32.18
Turnout		1,297		
Conservative hold		Swing		

=== Shifnal North ===
Shifnal North (1 seat)
Party	Candidate	Votes	%	±%
Independent	Kevin David Turley*	806	57.33	−23.85
Conservative	Louis Anthony Jenks	600	42.67	+23.85
Majority		206	14.66	−47.70
Turnout		1,406		
Independent hold		Swing		

=== Shifnal South and Cosford ===
Shifnal South and Cosford (1 seat)
Party	Candidate	Votes	%	±%
Conservative	Edward Francis Bird	952	56.13	−1.01
Independent	John Moore	429	25.29	
Labour	Jan Henri Coulson	315	18.57	
Majority		523	30.84	+5.18
Turnout		1,696		
Conservative hold		Swing		

=== St Martin's ===
St Martin's (1 seat)
Party	Candidate	Votes	%	±%
Conservative	Steve Davenport*	688	58.40	−8.14
Labour	Natalie Rowley	490	41.60	+8.14
Majority		198	16.80	−16.28
Turnout		1,178		
Conservative hold		Swing		

=== St Oswald ===
St Oswald (1 seat)
Party	Candidate	Votes	%	±%
Conservative	Joyce Bernadette Barrow*	755	58.57	−0.79
Green	Rosie Radford	534	41.43	
Majority		221	17.14	−1.58
Turnout		1,289		
Conservative hold		Swing		

=== Sundorne ===
Sundorne (1 seat)
Party	Candidate	Votes	%	±%
Labour	Kevin John Pardy*	599	73.05	−0.87
Conservative	David William Llwelyn Roberts	164	20.00	−6.08
Green	Gareth Egarr	44	5.37	
Liberal Democrats	Vijay Gajendra Naidu	13	1.59	
Majority		435	53.05	+5.21
Turnout		820		
Labour hold		Swing		

=== Tern ===
Tern (1 seat)
Party	Candidate	Votes	%	±%
Conservative	Lezley May Picton*	866	56.82	−5.80
Labour Co-op	Alan William Herbert	326	21.39	+5.73
No Label	Mandie Lee	181	11.88	
Green	Jamie Edward Russell	151	9.91	+3.92
Majority		540	44.94	−1.95
Turnout		1,524		
Conservative hold		Swing		

=== The Meres ===
The Meres (1 seat)
Party	Candidate	Votes	%	±%
Conservative	Brian Beckett Williams*	868	50.67	−14.91
Liberal Democrats	Helen Margaret Lilian Morgan	845	49.33	+37.37
Majority		23	1.34	−50.25
Turnout		1,713		
Conservative hold		Swing		

=== Underdale ===
Underdale (1 seat)
Party	Candidate	Votes	%	±%
Liberal Democrats	David Vasmer	535	45.80	+9.43
Labour	Eddie Uyan	371	31.82	+2.64
Conservative	David John Morgan	200	17.15	−10.43
Green	Marina Ann Churm	60	5.15	−1.72
Majority		164	14.06	+6.87
Turnout		1,166		
Liberal Democrats hold		Swing		

=== Wem ===
Wem (2 seats)
Party	Candidate	Votes	%	±%
Independent	Edward Walley Towers	1,141	48.29	N/A
Conservative	Peter Broomhall	933	39.48	+3.98
Liberal Democrats	Geoff Soul	894	37.83	−25.23
Conservative	Chris Parker	853	36.10	+18.81
Turnout		2,382		
Independent gain from Liberal Democrats		Swing		
Conservative gain from Independent		Swing		

=== Whitchurch North ===
Whitchurch North (2 seats)
Party	Candidate	Votes	%	±%
Conservative	Peggy Mullock*	1,129	57.43	−15.56
Conservative	Tom Biggins*	847	43.08	−5.84
Liberal Democrats	Nick Saxby	795	40.44	+26.93
Liberal Democrats	Ron Kelley	413	21.01	N/A
UKIP	Andy Allen	157	7.99	N/A
Turnout		1,982		
Conservative hold		Swing		
Conservative hold		Swing		

=== Whitchurch South ===
Whitchurch South (1 seat)
Party	Candidate	Votes	%	±%
Conservative	Gerald Lionel Dakin*	588	62.96	+10.34
Liberal Democrats	Gregory Kriangkrai Ebbs	346	37.04	+17.59
Majority		242	25.92	−7.25
Turnout		934		
Conservative hold		Swing		

=== Whittington ===
Whittington (1 seat)
Party	Candidate	Votes	%	±%
Conservative	Steve Charmley*	638	51.37	−2.07
Liberal Democrats	David Walker	604	48.63	+22.65
Majority		34	2.74	−24.72
Turnout		1,242		
Conservative hold		Swing		

=== Worfield ===
Worfield (1 seat)
Party	Candidate	Votes	%	±%
Conservative	Richard Peter Marshall	754	74.95	−1.83
Liberal Democrats	Helen Elizabeth Howell	147	14.61	+3.31
Green	James Andrew Wrench	105	10.44	
Majority		607	60.34	−4.53
Turnout		1,006		
Conservative hold		Swing		

== Changes 2021–2025 ==
=== Changes of affiliation ===
- Robert Tindall left the Conservative Party to become an independent in July 2021.
- David Minnery, elected as an independent in 2021 (having previously been elected as a Conservative in 2017), joined the Liberal Democrats in July 2024.
- David Minnery, elected as an independent in 2021 (having previously been elected as a Conservative in 2017), endorsed Liberal Democrat MP Helen Morgan in June 2024. The following month, he joined the Liberal Democrat group on Shropshire Council.

=== By-elections ===
==== Highley ====
Highley by-election, 23 June 2022
Party	Candidate	Votes	%	±%
Liberal Democrats	Mark Williams	630	54.5	N/A
Conservative	Naomi Waterson	279	24.1	−9.5
Labour	Liam Atwal	239	20.7	+7.3
Green	Clare Nash	9	0.8	N/A
Majority		351	30.3	
Turnout		1,157	40.3	
Liberal Democrats gain from Independent		Swing	N/A	

The by-election followed the resignation of independent councillor Dave Tremellen.

==== Bridgnorth West and Tasley ====
Bridgnorth West and Tasley by-election, 6 October 2022
Party	Candidate	Votes	%	±%
Labour	Rachel Connolly	887	55.9	N/A
Conservative	Jonathan Holland	480	30.2	N/A
Liberal Democrats	Richard Stilwell	176	11.1	N/A
Green	Clare Nash	45	2.8	N/A
Majority		407	25.6	
Turnout		1,588	28.9	
Labour gain from Conservative		Swing	N/A	

The by-election followed the death of Conservative councillor Les Winwood.

==== Worfield ====
Worfield by-election, 7 September 2023
Party	Candidate	Votes	%	±%
Liberal Democrats	Andrew Sherrington	400	48.1	+33.5
Conservative	Michael Wood	392	47.1	−27.8
Labour	Shanti Flynn	40	4.8	N/A
Majority		8	1.0	
Turnout		832	28.5	
Liberal Democrats gain from Conservative		Swing	▲30.6	

The by-election followed the resignation of Conservative councillor Richard Marshall.

==== Alveley and Claverley ====
Alveley and Claverley by-election, 19 October 2023
Party	Candidate	Votes	%	±%
Liberal Democrats	Colin Taylor	662	58.8	+36.6
Conservative	Jonathan Davey	408	36.3	−33.1
Labour	Ann Philp	55	4.9	N/A
Majority		254	22.6	
Turnout		1,125	31.6	
Liberal Democrats gain from Conservative		Swing	▲34.9	

The by-election followed the resignation of Conservative councillor Elliott Lynch.
