= Ursula Ridley, Viscountess Ridley =

English female aristocrat, born 1904

The Right Honourable The Viscountess Ridley OBE JP

Magistrate for Northumberland

Personal details
- Born: Ursula Lutyens; 31 October 1904 London, England
- Died: 28 December 1967 (aged 63)
- Spouse: Matthew White Ridley, 3rd Viscount Ridley
- Children: 3 (including Nicholas and Nicholas)
- Parent(s): Sir Edwin Landseer Lutyens; Lady Emily Bulwer-Lytton

Ursula Ridley, Viscountess Ridley (née Lutyens; 31 October 1904 – 28 December 1967) was a British magistrate, social campaigner, and charity worker.

== Early life ==
Ursula was born at 26 Bloomsbury Square on 31 October 1904. Ursula’s father was the architect Sir Edwin Landseer Lutyens and her mother was Lady Emily Bulwer-Lytton. She had four siblings:

- Barbara Lutyens (1898–1981), second wife of Euan Wallace (1892–1941), Minister of Transport.
- Robert Lutyens (1901–1971), interior designer. Designed the façade used for over 40 Marks & Spencer stores.
- (Agnes) Elisabeth Lutyens (1906–1983), a well-known composer. Second marriage to the conductor Edward Clark.
- (Edith Penelope) Mary Lutyens (1908–1999), a writer known for her books about the philosopher Jiddu Krishnamurti.

She was cared for in childhood by Alice Louisa Sleath, the Lutyens's family nanny.

== Marriage and children ==
Ursula Lutyens married Matthew White Ridley, 3rd Viscount Ridley on 13 Oct 1924 at St Margaret's, Westminster. According to a newspaper report, she chose to get married on the 13th as it was her lucky number. Her wedding reception was at 13 Mansfield Street (also her residence as recorded on the marriage certificate) and 13 children dressed in green attended the reception. Ursula had three children:

- Matthew White Ridley, 4th Viscount Ridley (29 July 1925 – 22 March 2012)
- Nicholas Ridley, Baron Ridley of Liddesdale (17 February 1929 – 4 March 1993)
- Hon. Laura Consuelo Ridley, who married Adrian Carrick.

== Social and charity work ==
=== Newcastle Babies Hospital ===
The Newcastle Babies Hospital began as a daycare facility for children whose mothers worked in munitions factories during World War I. It was located in a house at 33 West Parade, on the corner of Westmorland Road, in the west end of Newcastle. It then became a place for treating sick children and teaching “mother craft” which included teaching mothers how to breast feed. Sir James Calvert Spence, the eminent paediatrician, worked at the hospital and there developed his approach of social paediatrics. Ursula Ridley acted as Vice-President for the hospital from 1925 and was elected Chairman in 1930.

In September 1939, the hospital moved from the west end of Newcastle as a precaution against bombing. The hospital transferred to a wing of Blagdon Hall, the seat of the Ridley family. Over 300 mothers stayed at Blagdon between 1939 and 1944. Ursula took an active part in the hopital; assisting surgeons during operations and acting as "nurse receptionist".

=== Family Planning Association, Newcastle Branch ===
Ursula served as both Chair and President to the Newcastle Branch of the Family Planning Association and she opened the city's Family Planning Clinic in 1961. She argued that family planning should be an integral part of the National Health Service and that contraceptives should be available in pubs.

=== Justice of the Peace ===
Lady Ridley was appointed as a magistrate for Northumberland in 1944. In 1951 she addressed the Magistrates' Association in London, arguing that fines were an overused and ineffective punishment. She also used her speech to warn her fellow magistrates against lecturing those in the dock when sentencing. She doubted that it did any good and claimed that it actually provoked harmful resentment.

As the first president of the North East Branch of the Association, she addressed the Bradford and West Riding Magistrates in 1953. She told the assembly that fines and maintenance money should be taken directly from wage packets to allow people to budget more effectively and therefore avoid prison. She also argued that magistrates with expertise should be recruited, rather than appointments being a reward for public service. She claimed that this was particularly important for magistrates who sat in the juvenile courts.

=== Other positions ===
- Chair, Women's Welfare Clinic, Shieldfield Green, Newcastle (1935-1947)
- Chair, Princess Mary Maternity Hospital, Newcastle Management Committee
- Chair, Wansbeck Division Conservative Association, Women's Branch
- Member, Newcastle Hospital Management Board (pre-NHS)
- Co-opted member, NSPCC Child Care Committee
- Vice-Chair, Bridge in Britain Association (promoting Israeli-British student exchanges)
- Chair and President, Family Planning Association, Newcastle Branch
- President, Magistrates' Association, North East Branch
- Co-opted member, County Education Committee, Northumberland County Council
- Co-opted member, Maternity and Child Welfare Committee, Northumberland County Council
- Member, Royal Victoria Infirmary Committee

=== Honours and awards ===
In the 1953 Coronation Honours, Ursula Ridley was awarded the OBE for public services in Northumberland.

Durham University awarded Ursula an honorary Doctorate of Civil Law in 1959 at Newcastle.

== Death ==
An inquest found that Ursula Ridley died by suicide. It was reported that she had been suffering from ill-health since the death of her husband, four years previously.
