= Viscount Ridley =

Viscountcy in the Peerage of the United Kingdom

- Gules, a chevron argent between three close falcons argent, as many pellets
- Creation date: 17 December 1900
- Created by: Queen Victoria
- Peerage: Peerage of the United Kingdom
- First holder: Sir Matthew White Ridley, 5th Baronet
- Present holder: Matthew White Ridley, 5th Viscount Ridley
- Heir apparent: Hon. Matthew White Ridley
- Remainder to: Heirs male of the body
- Subsidiary titles: Baron Wensleydale
- Seat: Blagdon Hall
- Motto: Constans Fidei ("Constant in loyalty")

Viscount Ridley is a title in the Peerage of the United Kingdom. It was created in 1900 for the Conservative politician Sir Matthew White Ridley, 5th Baronet, Home Secretary from 1895 to 1900. He was made Baron Wensleydale, of Blagdon and Blyth in the County of Northumberland, at the same time, also in the Peerage of the United Kingdom. The latter title was a revival of the barony held by his maternal grandfather James Parke, Baron Wensleydale, whose title became extinct upon his death since none of his sons survived him.

The 1st Viscount was succeeded by his son, Matthew White Ridley, 2nd Viscount Ridley, who represented Stalybridge in the House of Commons. His own son, Matthew White Ridley, 3rd Viscount Ridley, later became Chairman of Northumberland County Council. The 3rd Viscount was followed in 1965 by his son, Matthew White Ridley, 4th Viscount Ridley, who went on to serve as Lord Steward of the Household from 1989 to 2001. Since 2012, the titles have been held by his son, Matthew White Ridley, 5th Viscount Ridley, a prominent science writer, journalist and businessman.

The Ridley, formerly White, baronetcy, (Note: The baronetcy is registered in the Official Roll of the Baronetage as "Ridley, formerly White, of Blagdon".) of Blagdon, in the County of Northumberland, is an extant title that was created in the Baronetage of Great Britain in 1756 for Sir Matthew White, 1st Baronet, with remainder to the heirs male of his sister Elizabeth White, wife of barrister Matthew Ridley. He was succeeded according to the special remainder by the son of his sister, the Sir Matthew White Ridley, 2nd Baronet. The latter went on to represent Morpeth and Newcastle-upon-Tyne in Parliament. He and all his heirs have borne (and continue to bear) the name ‘Matthew White Ridley’ (in which ‘White’ serves not as a surname but as a middle name adopted to reflect the family’s historical connection to the White family of Blagdon). On his death the title passed to his eldest son, Sir Matthew White Ridley, 3rd Baronet. He was also a Member of Parliament for Newcastle-upon-Tyne. He was succeeded by his son, Sir Matthew White Ridley, 4th Baronet. He represented Northumberland North in Parliament as a Conservative. Ridley was the husband of Cecilia Anne Parke, daughter of James Parke, 1st Baron Wensleydale. When he died the title was inherited by his son, Sir Matthew White Ridley, 5th Baronet, who was raised to the peerage as Viscount Ridley in 1900.

Some other members of the family have also gained distinction. Nicholas Ridley-Colborne, younger son of the second Baronet, was a politician and was created Baron Colborne in 1839. The Honourable Sir Jasper Ridley, younger son of the first Viscount, was an authority on banking and the arts. His grandson Adam Ridley is a noted economist. Nicholas Ridley, Baron Ridley of Liddesdale, younger son of the third Viscount, was a Conservative politician.

The family seat is Blagdon Hall, near Cramlington, Northumberland.

== Ridley, formerly White, baronets, of Blagdon (1756 - present) ==
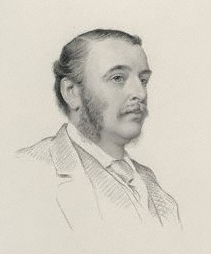
Matthew White Ridley, 1st Viscount Ridley

- Sir Matthew White, 1st Baronet (c. 1727 – 1763)
- Sir Matthew White Ridley, 2nd Baronet (1745–1813)
- Sir Matthew White Ridley, 3rd Baronet (1778–1836)
- Sir Matthew White Ridley, 4th Baronet (1807–1877)
- Sir Matthew White Ridley, 5th Baronet (1842–1904) (created Viscount Ridley in 1900)

== Viscount Ridley (1900 - present) ==
- Matthew White Ridley, 1st Viscount Ridley, 5th Baronet (1842–1904)
- Matthew White Ridley, 2nd Viscount Ridley, 6th Baronet (1874–1916)
- Matthew White Ridley, 3rd Viscount Ridley, 7th Baronet (1902–1964)
- Matthew White Ridley, 4th Viscount Ridley, 8th Baronet (1925–2012)
- Matthew White Ridley, 5th Viscount Ridley, 9th Baronet (born 1958)

The heir apparent is the present holder's son, the Hon. Matthew White Ridley (born 1993).

=== Title succession chart ===
Title succession chart, White (Ridley) baronets and Viscounts Ridley.

Matthew White	Elizabeth Johnson
White baronetcy
Matthew Ridley; 1711–1778	Elizabeth White; 1721–1764	Sir Matthew White; 1st Baronet c. 1727 – 1763
Sir Matthew White Ridley; 2nd Baronet; 1745–1813
Baron Colborne
Sir Matthew White Ridley; 3rd Baronet; 1778–1836	Nicholas Ridley-Colborne; 1st Baron Colborne; 1779–1854
Barony extinct
Sir Matthew White Ridley; 4th Baronet; 1807–1877	Hon. William Ridley-Colborne; 1814–1846
Baron Wensleydale; Viscount Ridley
Matthew White Ridley; 1st Viscount Ridley; 5th Baronet; 1842–1904
Matthew White Ridley; 2nd Viscount Ridley; 1874–1916
Matthew White Ridley; 3rd Viscount Ridley; 1902–1964
Matthew White Ridley; 4th Viscount Ridley; 1925–2012	Nicholas Ridley; Baron Ridley of Liddesdale; 1929–1993
Matthew White Ridley; 5th Viscount Ridley born 1958
Hon. Matthew White Ridley born 1993

== See also ==
- Baron Colborne
- Baron Ridley of Liddesdale
- Viscount Ridley - Landholders of Blyth

== Notes ==
Baronetage of Great Britain
Preceded by Johnson baronets	White baronets of Blagdon; 6 May 1756	Succeeded by Smith baronets
