= Adam Ridley =

British economist and civil servant

Sir Adam Nicholas Ridley (born 14 May 1942) is a British economist, civil servant, and banker.

After working at the Foreign Office and the Department of Economic Affairs, he was Director of the Conservative Research Department. With Chris Patten he wrote the Conservative election manifesto of 1979 and after the election was a Special Advisor to the Chancellors of the Exchequer until 1984. He later served as a director of Hambros Bank, of Morgan Stanley, and of Equitas insurance companies.

== Early life and background ==
The son of Jasper Maurice Alexander Ridley (1913–1943), by his marriage to Helen Laura Cressida Bonham-Carter, a daughter of Sir Maurice Bonham-Carter and Violet Asquith (herself a daughter of the British prime minister H. H. Asquith), Ridley lost his father during the Second World War. His grandfather, Sir Jasper Nicholas Ridley (1887–1951), was the younger son of Matthew White Ridley, 1st Viscount Ridley, Home Secretary in Lord Salisbury's government from 1895 to 1900, while his paternal grandmother was Countess Nathalie von Benckendorff, a daughter of Count Alexander von Benckendorff, Russian Ambassador to the Court of St James's between 1903 and 1917.

Ridley was educated at Eton and Balliol College, Oxford, where he took first class honours in philosophy, politics and economics in 1965.

He is a first cousin of the actress Helena Bonham Carter and a more distant cousin of the Conservative cabinet minister Nicholas Ridley and the historian Jane Ridley.

== Career ==
After joining the Foreign Office in 1965, Ridley was quickly seconded to the recently established Department of Economic Affairs, where he remained until 1968. He was a Harkness Fellow at the University of California, Berkeley, for the academic year 1968–1969, then returned to the Civil Service. He was with HM Treasury from 1970 to 1971, then joined Edward Heath's new Central Policy Review Staff (or "Think Tank") and remained there until the change of government in 1974. He then served for five years as Economic Adviser to the Conservative Shadow Cabinets of Heath and Margaret Thatcher.

In 1975, when Thatcher wrested the party leadership from Heath, Ridley was part of her inner circle, and in his book A View from the Wings Ronald Millar recalls working into the small hours with Ridley and Chris Patten on Thatcher's first speech as leader to a Conservative Party conference. In the summer of 1978, in the expectation of a general election later that year, a Conservative Party election manifesto was drafted by Ridley and Patten and edited by Angus Maude. In 1979, Ridley became Director of the Conservative Research Department. Following the Conservative victory in the general election of 1979, he was briefly at 10 Downing Street, before returning to the Treasury as a Special Advisor to Sir Geoffrey Howe and Nigel Lawson as Chancellors of the Exchequer between 1979 and 1984. In his memoir Inside the Bank of England, Christopher Dow notes that in 1979 only Ridley was brought into the Treasury as a political advisor, and that he was trusted even though he was not a monetarist. Ridley played a leading part in forming the new government's policy favouring privatisation.

Ridley's final post in the world of government was as advisor to the Chancellor of the Duchy of Lancaster for part of 1985. That year, he was knighted and made a career move into merchant banking. He was a director of Hambros Bank and of Hambros PLC from 1985 to 1997, and of Sunday Newspaper Publishing PLC from 1988 to 1990, serving as chairman in 1990. He was also Chairman of the Lloyd's of London Names Advisory Committee for 1995–1996, then a member of the Council of Lloyds and of the Lloyds Regulatory Board from 1997 to 1999. After leaving Hambros, he was a non-executive director of Leopold Joseph Holdings from 1998 to 2004, of Morgan Stanley Bank International from 2006 to 2013, and of Hampden Agencies Ltd from 2007 to 2012, and then of several Equitas insurance companies from 2009 to date.

He served on the National Lottery Charities Board from 1994 to 2000, most of that time as its Deputy chairman, and since 2003 has been a member of the Council of the British School at Athens.

== Private life ==
In 1970 Ridley married firstly his second cousin Lady Katharine Asquith, one of the daughters of Julian Asquith, 2nd Earl of Oxford and Asquith, but this ended in divorce in 1976. In 1981, he married secondly Margaret Anne Passmore, and they have three sons. He is a member of the Garrick Club and the Political Economy Club.

Christopher Dow recalled in his memoirs that when invited to lunch at the Bank of England Ridley habitually arrived by motorcycle.

== Publications ==
- Europe, the Challenge of Diversity (Routledge & Kegan Paul, Chatham House Papers series, 1985), with Helen Wallace
