= Matthew White Ridley, 4th Viscount Ridley =

British nobleman

The Right Honourable The Viscount Ridley KG GCVO TD DL
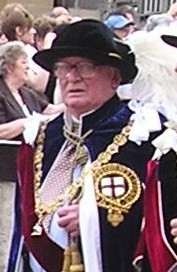
- Viscount Ridley in the robes of a Knight Companion of the Order of the Garter

Lord Steward
- In office 1989–2001
- Monarch: Elizabeth II
- Preceded by: The Duke of Northumberland
- Succeeded by: The Duke of Abercorn

Lord Lieutenant of Northumberland
- In office 3 January 1984 – 25 August 2000
- Monarch: Elizabeth II
- Preceded by: The Duke of Northumberland
- Succeeded by: Sir John Riddell, Bt

Member of the House of Lords
- Lord Temporal
- In office 25 February 1964 – 11 November 1999 as a hereditary peer
- Preceded by: The 3rd Viscount Ridley
- Succeeded by: Seat abolished (Note: Pursuant to the House of Lords Act 1999.)

Personal details
- Born: Matthew White Ridley; 29 July 1925 Blagdon Hall, Northumberland, England
- Died: 22 March 2012 (aged 86) Blagdon Hall, Northumberland, England
- Party: Conservative
- Spouse: Lady Anne Lumley
- Children: 4, including Matt Ridley and Rose Paterson
- Parent(s): Matthew White Ridley, 3rd Viscount Ridley; Ursula Lutyens
- Relatives: Nicholas Ridley, Baron Ridley of Liddesdale (brother); Elisabeth Lutyens (aunt); Mary Lutyens (aunt)
- Awards: Knight Companion of the Garter; Knight Grand Cross of the Royal Victorian Order

Military service
- Allegiance: United Kingdom
- Branch/service: British Army
- Years of service: 1944–1986
- Rank: Brevet Colonel
- Unit: Coldstream Guards; Northumberland Hussars
- Battles/wars: World War II

Matthew White Ridley, 4th Viscount Ridley (29 July 1925 – 22 March 2012), was a British nobleman. He was Lord Steward of the Household from 1989 to 2001.

== Background, education and military service ==
Ridley was the son of Matthew White Ridley, 3rd Viscount Ridley, and Ursula Lutyens, daughter of Sir Edwin Lutyens. His younger brother Nicholas Ridley, Baron Ridley of Liddesdale was a Conservative Party politician who served as a government minister for nearly all of Margaret Thatcher's years as prime minister.

Matthew Ridley was educated at Eton College and spent several months studying agriculture at King's College, University of Durham (now Newcastle University). The Second World War interrupted his education and he joined the Coldstream Guards, serving in Normandy and Germany in 1944–45. He then studied at Oxford, graduating with a degree in Agriculture from Balliol College in 1948.

He then served as an aide-de-camp to Sir Evelyn Baring, then Governor of Kenya. During this time he furthered his interest in nature and science. In 1955, Ridley and zoologist Lord Richard Percy spent four months on an uninhabited island in the Seychelles studying the plight of the dwindling sooty tern.

Later he joined the Territorial Army, reaching the rank of Brevet Colonel in the Northumberland Hussars: he became Honorary Colonel of that unit in 1979.

== Public life ==
Ridley succeeded his father in the viscountcy in 1964. He was Chairman of Northumberland County Council from 1967 to 1979. He chaired several companies and societies, before serving as Chancellor of the University of Newcastle from 1988 to 1999, as Lord Lieutenant of Northumberland from 1984 to 2000, and as Lord Steward of the Household from 1989 to 2001. He was succeeded by the Duke of Abercorn as Lord Steward in 2001.

He was made a Knight Companion of the Order of the Garter in 1992 and appointed a Knight Grand Cross of the Royal Victorian Order in 1994. He retired in 1999 and did not stand for election as a hereditary peer after the House of Lords Act.

== Marriage and children ==
Ridley was married on 3 January 1953 to Lady Anne Katharine Gabrielle Lumley (born 16 November 1928, died 2006), daughter of Lawrence Lumley, 11th Earl of Scarbrough. They had four children together:

- the Hon. Cecilia Anne Ridley (born 1 December 1953);
- the Hon. Rose Emily Ridley (13 August 1956 – 24 June 2020), married Owen Paterson in 1980 and had two sons and a daughter;
- Matthew White Ridley, 5th Viscount Ridley (born 7 February 1958); and
- the Hon. Mary Victoria Ridley (born 30 November 1962).

Ridley died on 22 March 2012 and was succeeded in the viscountcy by his only son.

== Notes ==
Honorary titles
Preceded by The Duke of Northumberland	Lord Lieutenant of Northumberland; 1984–2000	Succeeded by Sir John Riddell, Bt
Preceded by The Duke of Northumberland	Lord Steward; 1989–2001	Succeeded by The Duke of Abercorn
Academic offices
Preceded by The Duke of Northumberland	Chancellor of the University of Newcastle upon Tyne; 1988–1999	Succeeded by Chris Patten
Peerage of the United Kingdom
Preceded by Matthew White Ridley	Viscount Ridley; 1964–2012; Member of the House of Lords (1964–1999)	Succeeded by Matt Ridley
Baronetage of the United Kingdom
Preceded by Matthew White Ridley	White baronets of Blagdon; 1964–2012	Succeeded by Matt Ridley
