= Matthew White Ridley, 2nd Viscount Ridley =

British politician

The Right Honourable The Viscount Ridley JP DL
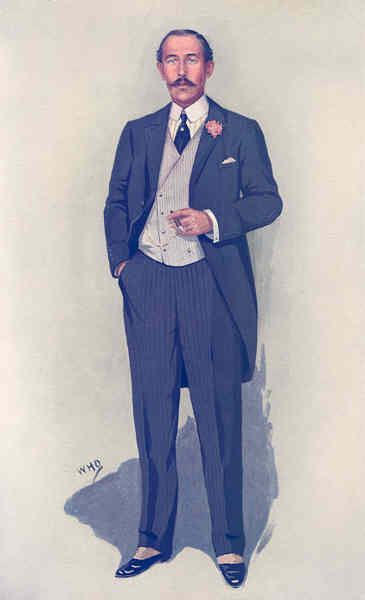
- "Tariff Reform League"; Viscount Ridley as caricatured in Vanity Fair, October 1910

Member of the House of Lords
- Lord Temporal
- In office 28 November 1904 – 14 February 1916
- Preceded by: The 1st Viscount Ridley
- Succeeded by: The 3rd Viscount Ridley

Personal details
- Born: 6 December 1874 London, England
- Died: 14 February 1916 (aged 41) Newcastle upon Tyne, England
- Party: Conservative
- Spouse: Rosamond Cornelia Gwladys Guest (m. 1899)
- Children: 3
- Parent(s): Matthew White Ridley, 1st Viscount Ridley; Mary Georgiana Marjoribanks
- Education: Balliol College, Oxford

Matthew White Ridley, 2nd Viscount Ridley (6 December 1874 – 14 February 1916) was a British peer and Conservative politician. His political career was most noted for his support of Tariff Reform.

== Biography ==
Ridley was the son and heir of Sir Matthew White Ridley, 1st Viscount Ridley, and the Hon. Mary Georgiana Marjoribanks (1850 – 14 March 1909), daughter of Dudley Marjoribanks, 1st Baron Tweedmouth. He was educated at Eton College and Balliol College, Oxford, where he graduated as BA in 1897, taking Honours in Greats. Whilst at Oxford he became a Freemason in the Apollo University Lodge, a Masonic lodge for students and former students of the university.

== Career ==
He was elected as the Member of Parliament for Stalybridge at the 1900 general election. While in parliament he also served as parliamentary private secretary to the Home Secretary, Charles Ritchie, from 1900 to 1902, and to the Chancellor of the Exchequer, Austen Chamberlain, from 1902 to 1904. He was chairman of the Tariff Reform League, in succession to its founder, Arthur Pearson.

On 21 May 1901, he was appointed a DL of the County of Northumberland, and in 1904 a JP.

He was commissioned a lieutenant in the Northumberland Hussars in 1897, was promoted captain on 12 April 1902, then major in 1904, becoming lieutenant colonel in command in 1913. He was in command of the regiment in the early months of the First World War but did not go abroad and relinquished command in 1915, remaining on the Territorial Force reserve of officers. He was also Honorary Colonel of the 5th Battalion, Northumberland Fusiliers, from 1910.

== Illness and death ==
Ridley suddenly fell ill at his home at Blagdon Hall on 28 January 1916 and required a "severe operation". The Times reported Lord Ridley had been "in indifferent health since his last grave illness three or four years ago, when an operation was also necessary", but did not offer specifics. Ridley had entertained Field Marshal John French at Blagdon two days before his illness and was scheduled to go to France with the Northumberland Hussars. He underwent a second operation on 13 February and died the following day in hospital, aged 41. His son succeeded him as viscount.

== Family ==
He married in London, on 8 February 1899, Rosamond Cornelia Gwladys Guest (1878–1947), daughter of Ivor Bertie Guest, 1st Baron Wimborne, and his wife Lady Cornelia (née Spencer-Churchill). Through her mother, she was a first cousin of Winston Churchill.

They had three children:

- Gwladys Marjorie Ridley (17 September 1900 – 28 July 1983)
- Matthew White Ridley, 3rd Viscount Ridley (16 December 1902 – 25 February 1964)
- Vivien Catherine Evelyn Ridley (born 15 December 1906), married Hans Karg von Bebenburg, 1934

Rosamond, Viscountess Ridley, was invested as a Dame Commander of the Order of the British Empire in 1918, and died 2 December 1947.

Parliament of the United Kingdom
Preceded by Tom Harrop Sidebottom	Member of Parliament for Stalybridge; 1900–1904	Succeeded by John Frederick Cheetham
Peerage of the United Kingdom
Preceded by Matthew White Ridley	Viscount Ridley; 1904–1916; Member of the House of Lords (1904–1916)	Succeeded by Matthew White Ridley
Baronetage of Great Britain
Preceded by Matthew White Ridley	Baronet of Blagdon; 1877–1904	Succeeded by Matthew White Ridley
