= Jasper Ridley =

Jasper Ridley may refer to

- Jasper Ridley (banker) (1887–1951), British barrister, banker, and agriculturalist
- Jasper Ridley (historian) (1920–2004), British historical writer
