= Jane Ridley =

English historian

The Honourable Jane Ridley FRSL
- Born: 15 May 1953 (age 73); Northumberland, England
- Education: St Hugh's College, Oxford; Nuffield College, Oxford
- Occupations: Professor of modern history; biographer; author
- Employer: University of Buckingham
- Spouse: Stephen Francis Thomas (m. 1986)
- Children: 2
- Parents: Nicholas Ridley; Clayre Campbell

Jane Ridley (born 15 May 1953) is an English historian, biographer, author and broadcaster, and Professor of Modern History at the University of Buckingham.

Ridley won the Duff Cooper Prize in 2002 for The Architect and his Wife, a biography of her great-grandfather Edwin Lutyens.

== Early life ==
Born in Northumberland in the northeast of England on 15 May 1953, Ridley is the eldest daughter of the former Conservative Cabinet minister Nicholas Ridley (1929–1993) and a granddaughter of Matthew, 3rd Viscount Ridley, by his marriage to Ursula Lutyens. Her father married Clayre Campbell (1927–2015), a daughter of Alistair, 4th Baron Stratheden and Campbell. They had three daughters. Her great-grandmother Lady Emily Bulwer-Lytton (1874–1964), who dismayed her parents by marrying the architect Edwin Lutyens, was a daughter of the Earl of Lytton, Viceroy of India in the 1870s. His parents were the novelists Edward and Rosina Bulwer Lytton. Her cousins include the economist Sir Adam Ridley.

Ridley was educated at Cranborne Chase School, an independent boarding school for girls, since closed, then occupying New Wardour Castle, near the village of Tisbury in Wiltshire, and later at St Hugh's College, Oxford, as an Exhibitioner in History. She took a first class honours degree in 1974, then was a research student at Nuffield College until 1978, graduating D. Phil. in 1985 with a thesis entitled Leadership and Management in the Conservative Party in Parliament 1906–1914.

== Academic career and work ==
In 1979, Ridley was appointed a lecturer in history at the University of Buckingham, where she was promoted to Senior Lecturer in 1994, to Reader in 2002, to Senior Tutor responsible for student discipline the next year, and finally to Professor in 2007. At Buckingham she continues to serve as Senior Tutor and to teach history and has been in charge of the university's Master of Arts course in biography since establishing it in 1996. This was the first such postgraduate course.

Ridley's first book was The Letters of Edwin Lutyens (1985), a collection of her great-grandfather's letters, edited jointly with her mother, Clayre Percy. She combined social history with her sport of fox hunting to produce Fox hunting: a history (1990), which begins with the words "Fox hunting isn't strictly necessary."

In 1995, Ridley's The Young Disraeli was published, dealing with Benjamin Disraeli's early years. She disputes that he should be considered the father of one-nation conservatism, writing that "Disraeli didn't use the expression and nor did he want to create a classless society... The legend of Disraeli was created largely by the Conservative party, which needed a hero on whom to pin its ideas about making the party electable in a democracy."

Ridley's biography of her great-grandfather Edwin Lutyens, The Architect and his Wife, won the Duff Cooper Prize for 2002.

In 2008, Ridley was given a Leverhulme Research Fellowship to work on her biography of King Edward VII, and this was finally published as Bertie: A Life of Edward VII in 2012. In reviewing the work for The Spectator, A. N. Wilson called it "profoundly learned and a cracking good read" and gave his opinion that "After this irreverent new life of Edward VII, royal biography will never be the same again."

== Personal life ==
In 1986, Ridley married Stephen Francis Thomas, a writer, the younger son of Sir William Cooper Thomas. They have two sons.

Ridley is a member of the committee of the London Library and lives in Dorset Square, Marylebone.

== Major publications ==
- The letters of Edwin Lutyens to his wife Lady Emily, ed. with Clayre Percy (Collins, 1985)
- Fox Hunting: a history (Collins, 1990)
- The Letters of Arthur Balfour and Lady Elcho, ed. with Clayre Percy (Hamish Hamilton, 1992)
- The Young Disraeli (London: Sinclair-Stevenson, 1995)
- The Architect and his Wife: a life of Edwin Lutyens (Chatto & Windus, 2002)
- Bertie: A Life of Edward VII (London: Chatto & Windus, 2012)
  - The Heir Apparent: A Life of Edward VII, the Playboy Prince (New York: Random House, 2012)
- Queen Victoria: a short life (Penguin, 2014)
- Contributions to the Oxford Dictionary of National Biography
- George V: Never a Dull Moment (Vintage Publishing, 2021)

== Honours ==
- Duff Cooper Prize, 2002
- Fellow of Royal Society of Literature, 2007
