= Esmé Hooton =

English poet (1914–1992)

Esmé Gladys Hooton (1914–1992) was an English poet.

== Biography ==
Hooton was born in Lewisham, London in 1914.

Hooton was the author of two collections of poetry: City Sonnets, published by Routledge in 1947, and Zoo, published by Peter Scupham's Mandeville Press in 1980 with illustrations by David Holbrook and an introduction by John Mole. Three poems from City Sonnets—"The Prophet," "Poor Bloom," and "At the Touch of Summer"—were also included by Geoffrey Grigson in his 1949 anthology Poetry of the Present.

Hooton's poem "The Thickening Veil" was set to music by composer Ivor Walsworth, and performed at Wigmore Hall in London during 1955. Though unpublished for 24 years, Zoo had been featured on BBC Home Service in 1956, read as a sequence with incidental music by Elisabeth Lutyens. Hooton's work was also featured on the Home Service in 1943 and on BBC Radio 3 in 1983.

She died in 1992.
