= Lady Emily Lutyens =

English theosophist and writer (1874–1964)

- Born: The Honourable Emily Bulwer-Lytton; 26 December 1874; Paris, France
- Died: 3 January 1964 (aged 89); London, England, U.K.
- Occupations: Theosophist; writer
- Spouse: Sir Edwin Lutyens (m. 1897; died 1944)
- Children: 5
- Parents: Robert Bulwer-Lytton, 1st Earl of Lytton (father); Edith Villiers (mother)

Lady Emily Lutyens (née Bulwer-Lytton; 26 December 1874 – 3 January 1964) was a British theosophist and writer.

== Life ==
Emily Lytton was born on 26 December 1874 in Paris, the daughter of Robert Bulwer-Lytton, 2nd Baron of Lytton (later the 1st Earl of Lytton) and Edith Villiers. She was brought up in Lisbon, India (where her father was Viceroy from 1876 to 1880) and Knebworth House, where she was educated by governesses.

From 1887 to 1891 she lived in Paris, where her father was British ambassador, and became a correspondent of the elderly Norfolk clergyman Whitwell Elwin. She returned to England after her father's death, and fell in love with Wilfrid Scawen Blunt, 35 years her senior:

From 17 to 21 Emily Lytton was the friend of the magnificent "oriental" Englishman, Wilfred Scawen Blunt. At 21 (when he was 57) she was among the women who fascinated him; when he had been dead for more than 30 years the spell and the danger of him lingered in her so vividly that in her first book (A Blessed Girl), written when she was 80, she proclaimed his dishonourable intentions with charm and some unfairness.

She became the lifelong friend of Blunt's daughter, Judith (later Baroness Wentworth).

In 1897 she married the architect Edwin Landseer Lutyens. She had five children, including Mary Lutyens, the composer Elisabeth Lutyens, the social worker Ursula Ridley, Viscountess Ridley, and the painter Robert Lutyens. Lutyens interested herself in social and political questions, such as the state regulation of prostitution. She was a visitor to the local lock hospital, a member of the Moral Education League, and a supporter of women's suffrage. She introduced her older sister Lady Constance Bulwer-Lytton to the suffrage movement, though was herself opposed to militancy and resigned from the Women's Social and Political Union in 1909.

In 1910 she joined the Theosophical Society. She became a kind of surrogate parent to the young Jiddu Krishnamurti, brought back from India with his brother by Annie Besant in 1911. Appointed by Besant as the English representative of the Order of the Star in the East, Lutyens toured the country lecturing on behalf of theosophy. She edited the theosophical journal Herald of the Star, and attracted wealthy converts to theosophy, such as Mabel Dodge. In 1916, at the same time as her husband was busy designing an imperial capital at New Delhi, she held meetings for an all-India home rule movement in her drawing-room in London. She continued to protect and care for Krishnamurti, to whom she was devoted. As a young adult Krishnamurti wrote to her daily from France. In the 1920s she toured the world with him, convinced that he was the Messiah. In 1925 she founded the League of Motherhood, but by this time theosophy was divided over Krishna's claims. She supported Krishnamurti trying to dissolve the Theosophical Society, and in 1930 followed him in resigning from theosophy.

Lutyens published two autobiographical works: A Blessed Girl (1953) was a memoir of her upbringing, and Candles in the Sun (1957) told the story of her theosophical involvement. The Birth of Rowland (1956) was a collection of her parents' letters.

The historian, Brian Harrison, interviewed two of Lutyens' daughters, Elisabeth and Mary, in June 1975 and April 1976 respectively, as part of his Suffrage Interviews project, titled Oral evidence on the suffragette and suffragist movements: the Brian Harrison interviews. Elisabeth talks about her mother's relationship with theosophy, her time in India, relationships with other family members, her disapproval of suffragette militancy, and lesbianism in the suffragette movement. Mary's interview includes Emily's influence over her brother, Victor Bulwer-Lytton, as regards Home Rule in India.

She died at her home in London on 3 January 1964, eight days after her 89th birthday.

== Vegetarianism ==
Lutyens was a strict vegetarian. Historian Jane Ridley has noted that "Never a meat-eater, Emily became a doctrinaire vegetarian, subsisting on nut cutlets disguised as lamb with a piece of macaroni wrapped in a paper frill instead of a bone". Lutyens also raised her children on a vegetarian diet but her husband Edwin was a meat-eater. Lutyens was a vice-president of the Vegetarian Society.

== Selected publications ==
- The Faith Catholic: Some Thoughts on the Athanasian Creed, 1918
- Theosophy as the Basic Unity of National Life. Being the Four Convention Lectures Delivered in Bombay at the Forty-Ninth Anniversary of the Theosophical Society, December, 1924, 1925
- The Call of the Mother, 1926
- A Blessed Girl: Memoirs of a Victorian Girlhood Chronicled in an Exchange of Letters, 1887-1896, 1953
- The Birth of Rowland: an Exchange of Letters in 1865 between Robert Lytton and His Wife, 1956
- Candles in the Sun, 1957, with Mary Lutyens
