= Joseph Gluckstein Links =

British writer, art historian and furrier

- Born: Joseph Gluckstein Links; 13 December 1904; London, England
- Died: 1 October 1997 (aged 92); London, England
- Occupations: Writer; art historian; furrier
- Spouse: Mary Lutyens (m. 1945)
- Writing career
- Genres: Art history, Guide book
- Notable work: Venice for Pleasure
- Notable awards: Order of the British Empire

Joseph Gluckstein Links (13 December 1904 – 1 October 1997) was a British writer, art historian, and furrier who is principally known for his expertise and works on the Venetian painter Canaletto and for Venice for Pleasure, a travel guide to Venice.

== Early life ==
Joseph Gluckstein Links was born on 13 December 1904 in London, to Katey (née Symons, 1 February 1882 - 29 August 1918) and Calman Links (1868 – 16 August 1925). Joseph or Joe, he was commonly called, had two younger siblings, Eileen Hannah Links (25 August 1909 – 1982) and Joyce Links (15 October 1914 – ).

His father was a Jewish refugee from Hungary who had co-founded the fur business, Calman Links. His mother died in 1918 before he was 13 years old. Two years later his father learned that he was also terminally ill. With no time to spare, he removed his son from school in order before he died to teach him the fur trade in general and how to run the business.

"I was an unwilling and sullen pupil", Links wrote, but he later appreciated that forced him into a career. "There was the business and I jolly well had to go and earn my living at it."

== Career ==
=== Furrier ===
While his father had mostly traded in skunk skins and thus the low end of the fur trade, Links after taking responsibility for the business moved it upmarket. In the 1920s, fur was very popular in the fashion world with every woman wanting a fur coat. By the 1930s, Calman Links was one of its most prominent furriers in London, which at the time was the centre of a booming luxury fur trade. Even the Great Depression had little impact on Calman Links. For many years the business was located at 33 Margaret Street, London.

Calman Links eventually gained the royal warrant and Links was for a period a director of the Hudson's Bay Company, and served as President of the British Fur Trade Alliance. In 1956, Links wrote a book on fur, The Book of Fur.

=== Beginning of his writing career ===
Links was a friend of Nancy Robinson, heiress to the Nugget Boot Polish fortune, who married Dennis Wheatley in 1922. The two men became lifetime friends and remained so after Wheatley and Robinson divorced in 1930. The pair shared a taste for luxury, most notably in the form of good cigars and expensive wines. As Wheatley attempted to write his first novel, Links supported him with advice and by lending money.

One night over dinner, circa 1935, Links suggested to Wheatley they consider cooperating to produce a murder mystery in the form of a dossier of clues. For a period Wheatley was unconvinced as Links had no background in writing, yet alone game design. Wheatley was by now in demand as a writer, but had no experience in writing detective novels. Worn down by Links' persistence Wheatley approached his publisher, Hutchinson, but they were lukewarm as it would be expensive to produce and was not something they had experience in. In order to keep Wheatley happy, they finally agreed, provided Links and Wheatley would be willing to accept no royalties at all on the first 10,000 copies sold, and one penny per copy after that. Links and Wheatley agreed to these terms. Links planned the mystery and devised the clues, while Wheatley wrote the text of the included documents. As Wheatley's name was known to the reading public, the dossier was credited to Wheatley, with a “planned by J.G. Links” below in smaller letters.

Their first effort Murder off Miami was published on 23 July 1936 at a price of 3 shillings and 6 pence. Initially bookstall and bookshop managers were sceptical as they were difficult to display and it was felt that they were too innovative for general consumption. To counter this apprehension Wheatley entertained numerous London bookshop managers, convincing them to take a small number.

Selfridges agreed to take 1,000 copies, provided Wheatley signed each one, which he gladly did. 120,000 copies were sold in six months and it went on to sell over 200,000 copies in Britain in its first year. Queen Mary purchased six copies from Hatchards. It was translated into several other languages.

Although there had been ‘solve it yourself’ crime books in the past, such as the ‘Baffle Books’ created by Lassiter Wren and Randle McKay, Links and Wheatley took it to another level, by providing a cardboard folder containing all the evidence that an investigating team of detectives might gather. In the folder was a variety of reports, testimonies, letters, as well as physical clues such as hairs or pills. The reader had to inspect this evidence to solve the mystery before checking his conclusion with the actual solution, concealed within a sealed section towards the rear of the folder. In all four 'Crime Dossiers' were published, the others being Who Killed Robert Prentice?, The Malinsay Massacre, and Herewith The Clues!.

Some of the letters in Who Killed Robert Prentice? were scented with unique perfumes, providing vital clues about their origins, while there was a torn-up photograph of the victim cavorting with a naked woman. The reader had to reassemble this photograph to obtain a clue.

The crime dossiers were very popular both in Britain and around the world. When published in Germany, the Nazi Chamber of Literature and the Ministry of Propaganda took a dim view of Who Killed Robert Prentice claiming that the main protagonist, Cicely Prentice, was a woman whose "moral character must be designated more than inferior". For many years it had been assumed that as a result it had been banned, but evidence has surfaced that there was a pre-war German edition.

Beginning in 1979 with Murder off Miami all four were reissued by Hutchinson in facsimile over the next three years, ending with Herewith the Clues in 1982 to modest press notices and modest sales.

In 1986, Webb and Bower in conjunction with Michael Joseph, unsuccessfully published the crime dossiers in glossy hardback editions, with the physical clues reduced to photographs.

=== World War II ===
During the Second World War, Links served as a Wing Commander in the Royal Air Force working on barrage balloons in the Air Ministry.

A chance meeting during his military service bought him into contact with Robert Lutyens, son of the architect Sir Edwin Lutyens. Through Robert Lutyens, Links, a longtime bachelor met his sister, Mary, whom he subsequently married in 1945.

=== Venice ===
Initially, Links proposed having their honeymoon on a troopship going to New York, but Mary's objection led to the selection of Venice as a more suitable option.

This first visit for both of them to Venice resulted in their becoming instantly captivated and for the next 30 years, they visited Venice two or three times a year. In the late 1960s Links became involved in the establishment of the Venice in Peril Fund, a fund to prevent the buildings of Venice from crumbling into the lagoon. Both Links and Mary supported it for the rest of their lives.

Already an admirer of the art critic John Ruskin, Links took along on one of their early visits to Venice a copy of The Stones of Venice. Links was to publish an abridged version of this classic of art history, while Mary wrote biographies of both Ruskin and his wife, Effie Gray.

=== Canaletto ===
As a result of fascination with Venice, Links developed in interest in Venetian painter Canaletto. In 1962 Mary gave Links a copy of William G. Constable's recently published monograph on Canaletto, which mentioned a missing painting by the artist. Links recognized it as the painting hanging over his sister-in-law's fireplace and passed this information on to Constable, leading to the two men corresponding. When Constable meet Links in person he asked him to take over revising the book for its second edition. The task took Links six years rather than the six months Constable had anticipated., the resulting book Canaletto: Giovanni Antonio Canal, 1697-1768 when published in 1976 led to Links who was self-taught and had no formal training becoming recognized as a world expert on Canaletto.

=== Venice for Pleasure ===
In reply to his friends constantly asked for advice prior to visiting Venice, Links would write letters describing what to see and do. One such friend intending to visit the city was the publisher Max Reinhardt, of The Bodley Head, to whom Links provided advice in such a letter. Reinhardt's client Charles Chaplin and his wife also found the advice of benefit, which engaged Reinhardt to ask Links to write a book on the subject.

The result was Venice for Pleasure which received favourable reviews. In 1977 in The Times Bernard Levin called it "not only the best guide-book to that city ever written, but the best guide-book to any city ever written."

James Mustich listed the book in his 1,000 Books To Read Before You Die: A Life-Changing List offering the opinion that "Links weaves a spell that evokes the joy of urban wanderings the enduring fascination of beauty, the ambience of time, and the pleasure of coming upon a welcoming cafe at just the moment one's feet need a rest and one's mind a respite."

A fifth expanded edition was published in 1994 and by 2015 it was in its ninth edition.

== Death ==
He died at his London home on 1 October 1997.

== Personal life ==
Links married writer Mary Lutyens (31 July 1908 – 9 April 1999) in 1945, with the marriage ending with his death. While the couple had no children of their own, Links was stepfather to Mary's daughter Amanda Lutyens Sewell by her previous marriage.

== Honours ==
Links was made an officer of the Order of the British Empire (OBE) for his wartime service in 1946.

== Bibliography ==
He wrote his books using the name, J. G. Links

=== Fiction ===
Crime dossiers (with Dennis Wheatley)

- Murder off Miami, London: Hutchinson, July 1936. In America, William Morrow published it under the title Crimefile Number 1 File on Bolitho Blane,
- Who Killed Robert Prentice?, London: Hutchinson, June 1937.
- The Malinsay Massacre, London: Hutchinson, April 1938.
- Herewith the Clues!, London: Hutchinson, July 1939.

=== Non-fiction ===
- The Book Of Fur, London: James Barrie, 1956.
- Venice For Pleasure, London: The Bodley Head, 1966.
- The Ruskins in Normandy: A Tour in 1848 with Murray's Hand-book, London, John Murray, 1968: ISBN 978-0-719518-17-1
- Townscape Painting and Drawing, London: Harper Collins, 1972: ISBN 978-0-713407-26-6
- Canaletto: Giovanni Antonio Canal, 1697-1768. Oxford: Clarendon Press, 1976: ISBN 978-0-198173-24-3. Originally written by, its two volumes were revised by Links for the 2nd edition
- Canaletto and His Patrons, London: Paul Elek, 1977: ISBN 978-0-236400-61-4
- Travellers in Europe: Private Records of Journeys by the Great and the Forgotten: From Horace to Pepys , London: Bodley Head, 1980: ISBN 978-0-370302-02-7.
- Canaletto, Ithaca / London: Cornell University Press / Phaidon, 1982: ISBN 978-0-801415-32-6
- Canaletto edited with Katharine Baetjer; with essays by J.G. Links, Michael Levey, Francis Haskell, Alessandro Bettagno, Viola Pemberton-Pigott, New York: The Metropolitan Museum of Art, 1989. ISBN 978-0-810931-55-8
