= Matthew White Ridley, 3rd Viscount Ridley =

The Right Honourable The Viscount Ridley CBE

Member of the House of Lords
- Lord Temporal
- In office 14 February 1916 (Note: He took his seat on 16 December 1924.) – 25 February 1964 as a hereditary peer
- Preceded by: The 2nd Viscount Ridley
- Succeeded by: The 4th Viscount Ridley

Personal details
- Born: Matthew White Ridley; 16 December 1902 Marylebone, London
- Died: 25 February 1964 (aged 61) Northumberland, England
- Citizenship: British
- Spouse: Ursula Lutyens
- Children: 3
- Parent: Matthew White Ridley, 2nd Viscount Ridley
- Education: Eton College
- Alma mater: Balliol College, Oxford

Matthew White Ridley, 3rd Viscount Ridley (16 December 1902 – 25 February 1964) was a British peer, landowner, public servant and race car driver. He was also the third Baron Wensleydale and seventh Baronet Ridley.

== Biography ==
=== Early life and education ===
Ridley was the son and heir of the 2nd Viscount Ridley and Rosamond Cornelia Gwladys Guest, daughter of the 1st Baron Wimborne. He succeeded to the family titles when he was just 13 years old, after his father's death on 14 February 1916, though he was not seated in the House of Lords until he reached the age of 22. He attended Eton College and Balliol College, Oxford.

=== Racing ===
Ridley was a self-taught engineer and car racing enthusiast. At the family estate, Blagdon Hall, he designed and built his own car to challenge the speed records for Class H vehicles (501–750 cc). In 1931, he set the record for the "flying kilometre and flying mile" in the International Class A at Brooklands, with mean speeds of 105.42 mph (kilometre) and 104.56 mph (mile). He was badly injured in an accident at Brooklands at the end of the 1931 season, when his car reportedly reached a speed of 112 mph.

=== Career ===
He inherited considerable estates in Northumberland (10,000 acres) and devoted his life to public affairs. He was a member of the Northumberland County Council from 1928 to his death, and chairman of the North-East Development Association, the North-East Industrial and Development Association, the Northern Regional Board for Industry, and the Rock Building Society.

In business, he also served as chairman of the Consett Iron Works, director of the Moor Line steamship company, and a member of the board of Lloyds Bank.

Ridley was active in the Territorial Army, serving as an officer in the Northumberland Yeomanry and as the Honorary Colonel of the Tyne Electrical Engineers. Nationally he served as Director of Hydrogen Production for the Air Ministry, Director of Producer Gas Vehicles for Ministry of Transport and as North Regional Controller of the Ministry of Production. During the Second World War, he designed an auxiliary engine for Sunderland flying boats.

In 1937, he became chairman of the council of King's College, Newcastle, and had a significant role in the creation of the new University of Newcastle upon Tyne.

Viscount Ridley was invested as a Commander of the Order of the British Empire in the 1938 New Year Honours for "public services in Durham and Tyneside".

=== Family ===
Ridley married Ursula Lutyens, daughter of Sir Edwin Lutyens and Lady Emily Bulwer-Lytton (daughter of Robert Bulwer-Lytton, 1st Earl of Lytton), on 13 October 1924. They had three children:

- Matthew White Ridley, 4th Viscount Ridley (29 July 1925 – 22 March 2012)
- Nicholas Ridley, Baron Ridley of Liddesdale (17 February 1929 – 4 March 1993)
- Hon. Laura Consuelo Ridley, who married Adrian Carrick.

== Notes ==
Peerage of the United Kingdom
Preceded by Matthew White Ridley	Viscount Ridley; 1916–1964; Member of the House of Lords (1916–1964^{1})	Succeeded by Matthew White Ridley
Baronetage of the United Kingdom
Preceded by Matthew White Ridley	White baronets of Blagdon; 1916–1964	Succeeded by Matthew White Ridley
Notes and references
1. He took his seat in the House of Lords on 16 December 1924.
