= Selsdon Group =

Free market pressure group

- Formation: 1973; 53 years ago
- Type: Public policy think tank
- Headquarters: London
- Official language: English
- Chairman: John Wilkin
- Affiliations: Conservative Party
- Website: www.selsdongroup.co.uk

The Selsdon Group is a British free-market economics pressure group, closely associated with the Conservative Party.

The "Selsdon Declaration", to which all members must subscribe, was adopted at the Selsdon Group's first meeting, held at the Selsdon Park Hotel in September 1973. Nicholas Ridley closed his keynote speech at that meeting by citing the "Ten Cannots" of William J. H. Boetcker, adding that it "could well become the guiding principle of the Selsdon Group".

== See also ==
- Selsdon
