= Ivor Walsworth =

English composer

Ivor Clifton Walsworth (1909 – 2 November 1978) was a composer, violinist, and BBC sound engineer and music producer.

Born in London, Walsworth studied at the Royal Academy of Music – he was the recipient of the Mendelssohn Scholarship in 1932 – and subsequently in Munich, Budapest and Vienna. He joined the BBC in 1936, later becoming a key producer for the BBC Transcription Services. On 6 January 1937 in Roehampton he married the concert pianist Joan Davies (1912–1982), a pupil of Egon Petri. She often performed his music. His war service was with the London Fire Service and the Home Guard, while his wife served as an ambulance driver. A serious illness led to him taking a less demanding role at the BBC before his retirement.

Walsworth was a prolific composer but his music has been forgotten today. He composed four symphonies, various concertos (for piano, gamba, violin and cello), three string quartets and other chamber, instrumental works and songs. He appears to have struggled to establish a consistent style. The orchestral Rhapsodic Dance, heard at the Henry Wood Proms on 2 October 1931, was described by one reviewer as "a vein of glorified jazz", while the Harpsichord Sonata was a neo-classical "novelty". He also wrote songs in the ballad style and light orchestral music for several short film documentaries in the 1940s. But his chamber and instrumental works could be uncompromisingly modern, as in the Piano Sonata, premiered by his wife at the Wigmore Hall on 5 December 1949. It "so assaulted one's ear that at the end little was retained other than an impression of extreme violence", wrote one critic.

Towards the end of his life his music became more esoteric and experimental. He was a teacher and friend of Daphne Oram of the BBC Radiophonic Workshop and collaborated with her on a series of electronic music pieces, such as Contrasts Essconic in 1968.

In the 1960s he and his wife Joan Davies were living at 59 Wimpole Street in London and at Leyland Cottage in Pevensey Bay, East Sussex, where there were four grand pianos. They house shared at both locations with the soprano Audrey Strange.

He died in London, aged 69. His archive is held at the University of London, Goldsmiths Special Collections.

== Selected works ==
- Rhapsodic Dance for orchestra (1931)
- Two Watercolours for orchestra (1931)
- Two Preludes for chamber orchestra (1932)
- Ésion for piano and orchestra (1933)
- Prelude for string quartet (Vienna, 1934)
- Violin Concerto, in one movement (1934)
- Symphony Oriental (1935)
- String Trio, Aisling (1936)
- Harpsichord Sonata (1937)
- Prelude for Strings (1937)
- String Quartet (1947)
- Piano Quartet (1949)
- Piano Sonata (1949)
- Sleep on my love (song, text Henry King) (1949)
- Flute Sonata (1950)
- Here, where the world is quiet (song, text Swinburne) (1950)
- Meditation on Four Sonnets, for contralto and trio (1951)
- Lento e accelerando, violin and piano (1952)
- Suite for viola and cello, OUP (1952)
- Violin Sonata in A (1953, first performance by Alfredo Campoli, Royal Festival Hall)
- The Thickening Veil for voice, oboe, and piano (text Esmé Hooton) (1955)
- Passacaglia (1958, with Daphne Oram)
- Contrasts Essconic for piano and tape (1968, with Daphne Oram)
- Exequy, funeral march for piano (composed for Oxfam, based on text by Michel Quoist) (1969)
- Sardonica for piano and tape (1972, with Daphne Oram)
- Sea Sonnet for piano (1972)
- Twelve Grounds for Complaint for piano (1973)

Film scores

- The Star and the Sand, Merlin Films (1945)
- Unity is Strength, World Wide Pictures (1945)
- Papworth Village Settlement, World Wide Pictures (1946)
- Playing in the Road, Petroleum Films Bureau (1947)
