= The Manor, Mosman =

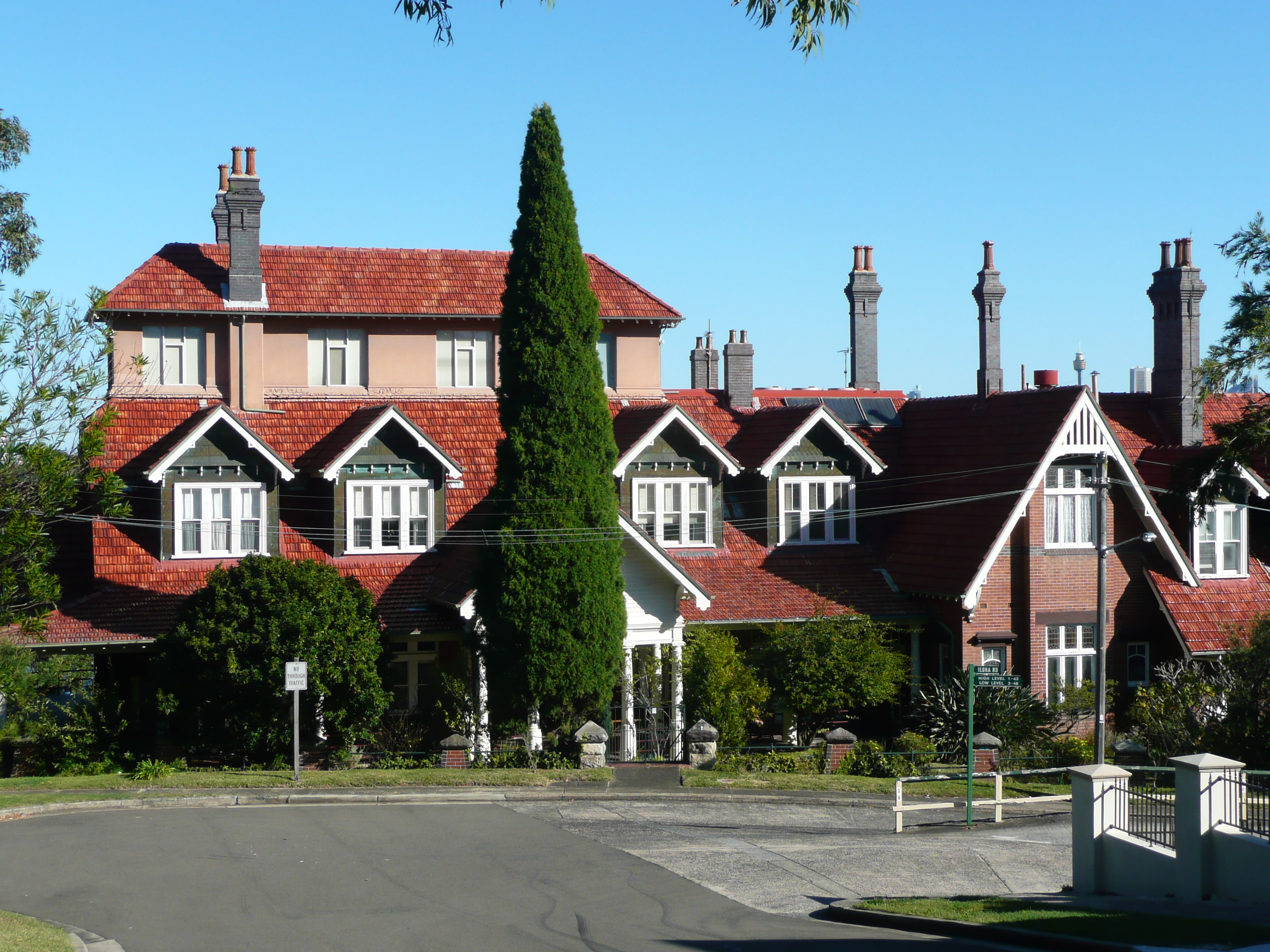
- The Manor seen from Iluka Road, Mosman

- Location within inner Sydney
- Alternative names: Bakewell's Folly

General information
- Status: Completed
- Type: House
- Architectural style: Federation Queen Anne
- Location: Iluka Road, Mosman, Sydney, New South Wales, Australia
- Coordinates: 33°50′36″S 151°15′03″E
- Completed: c. 1911
- Client: William John Bakewell
- Owner: Theosophical Society

New South Wales Heritage Database (Local Government Register)
- Official name: The Manor House
- Designated: 9 December 2011
- Reference no.: 41

The Manor is a mansion located in Mosman, a suburb of Sydney, New South Wales, Australia. Built c. 1911, loosely in the Federation Queen Anne style, it stands in the harbour-front street of Iluka Road, in the Mosman locality of Clifton Gardens.

The house is listed on the Mosman Council local government heritage register.

== History and description ==
The Manor's original owner, William John Bakewell, of Bakewell Bros., initially planned a cottage of eight rooms, but the project kept growing until it was a mansion with fifty-five rooms, most of which were lined with beaten copper. It was spread over six allotments in Margaret Street, which later became Iluka Road. It became known locally as Bakewell's Folly.

In 1922, the Theosophical Society rented The Manor for a community of some fifty people, headed by Charles Leadbeater, a claimed clairvoyant, and a major figure in the Society. The Manor became an important centre for the Society and was regarded as a great "occult forcing-house". The English writer Mary Lutyens stayed at The Manor in the 1920s and described it as "a huge and hideous villa". The young Indian Jiddu Krishnamurti, who was presented as the new "World Teacher", stayed in nearby David Street with his brother Nitya while Lutyens—his eventual biographer—stayed at The Manor. The Theosophical Society bought the house in 1925, holding it under a trust deed. In 1926 they started the radio station 2GB; the initials stood for Giordano Bruno. The station operated from The Manor for a few years. In 1951, they established The Manor Foundation Ltd. to own and run the house. As of 2013, the Society used The Manor.

== Gallery ==
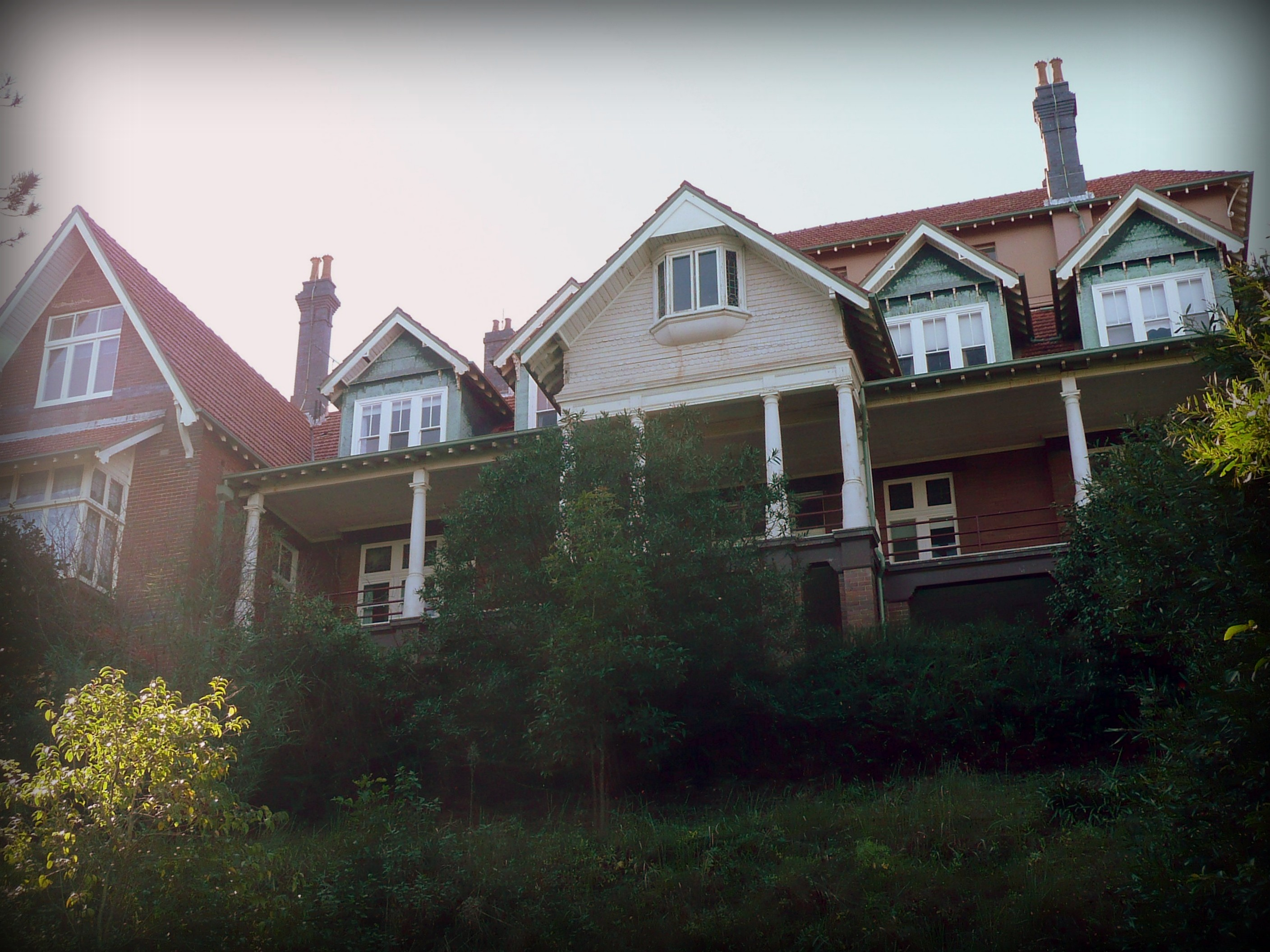
South side of house, facing Sydney Harbour

== See also ==
- List of heritage houses in Sydney
