= Army Riding School =

Military building in Newcastle upon Tyne, England

- Newcastle upon Tyne
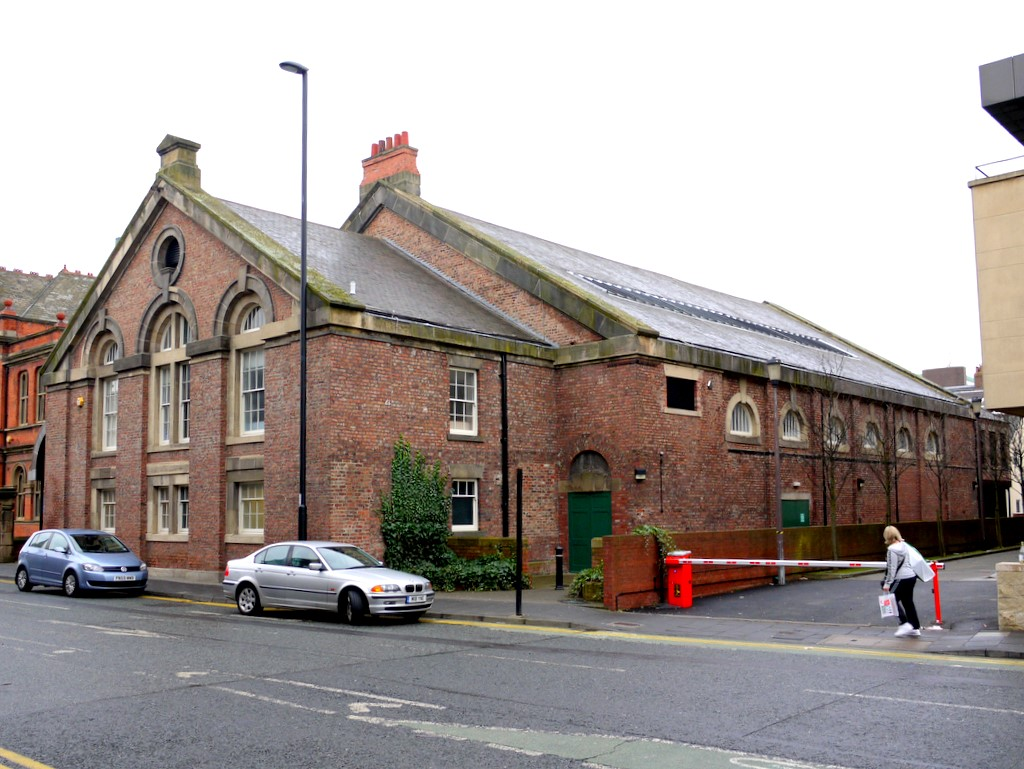
- Army Riding School

Site information
- Type: Drill Hall

Location
- Location within Tyne and Wear
- Coordinates: 54.97684°N 1.61024°W

Site history
- Built: 1849
- Built for: War Office
- Architect: John Dobson
- In use: 1849-1975

The Army Riding School was a military installation in Northumberland Road, Newcastle upon Tyne.

== History ==
The facility was designed by John Dobson and built to serve as a riding school for the Northumberland and Newcastle Volunteer Corps of Cavalry in 1849. The regiment was renamed the Northumberland (Hussars) Yeomanry Cavalry in 1876 and the Northumberland Yeomanry in 1908. The regiment was mobilised at the riding school in September 1916 before landing at Zeebrugge for service on the Western Front. The riding school was used as an operational headquarters during the Miners strike in early 1921 and continued to be used by the regiment as its regimental headquarters until the Second World War.

Meanwhile, the 6th Battalion of the Northumberland Fusiliers moved from the St Mary's Place drill hall in Newcastle upon Tyne (since demolished) to the Army Riding School, referred to by the Northumberland Fusiliers as "St George's drill hall", in 1908. The 6th Battalion then moved to the Church Street drill hall in Walker (since demolished) in 1920.

The Northumberland Yeomanry re-occupied the riding school in 1946 in its new capacity as the 50th (Northumbrian) Divisional Reconnaissance Regiment. However, the regimental headquarters and 'A' Squadron moved to Debden Gardens in Heaton in 1954. Instead, the riding school became known as the Yeomanry Drill Hall and, in that capacity, served as a drill hall for the Northumbrian Universities Officers' Training Corps in the 1960s. After the Officers' Training Corps moved to St George's Army Reserve Centre in Jesmond in 1975, the building was decommissioned and became the City of Newcastle Employers Club. The building is now occupied by Northumbria University which uses it as an information technology centre and as a lecture theatre facility for its law school. It is a Grade II Listed building.

== Sources ==
- Hewitson, T.L. (2006). Weekend Warriors from Tyne to Tweed. Stoud: Tempus Publishing Limited. ISBN 0-7524-3756-9.
- Allen, Joan (2005). Rutherford's Ladder: The Making of Northumbria University, 1871-1996. Northumbria University Press. ISBN 978-1904794097.
