= Mary Lutyens =

British writer

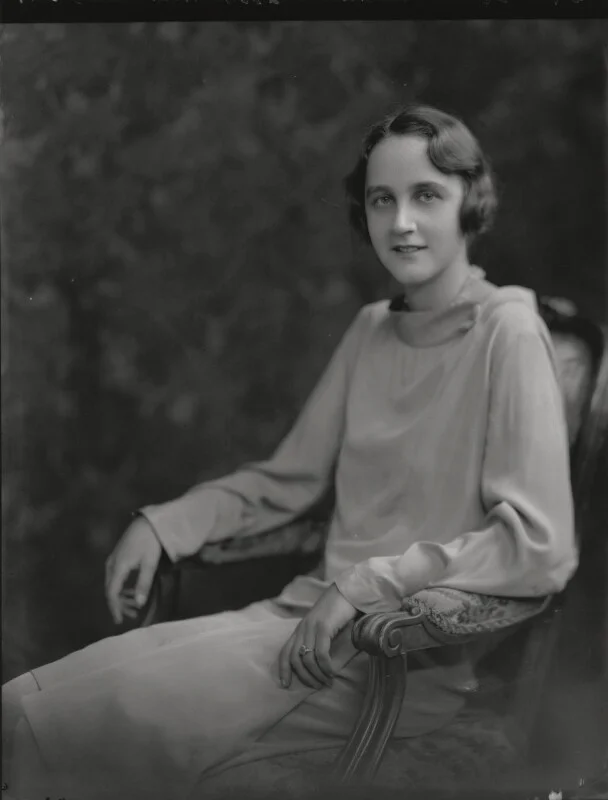
- Born: Edith Penelope Mary Lutyens; 31 July 1908; Bloomsbury Square, London, England
- Died: 9 April 1999 (aged 90); London, England
- Occupation: Writer
- Spouses: Anthony Sewell (m. 1930; div. 1945) Joseph Gluckstein Links (m. 1945; died 1997)
- Children: 1 daughter
- Parent(s): Edwin Lutyens; Lady Emily Bulwer-Lytton
- Relatives: Elisabeth Lutyens (sister); Matthew White Ridley, 4th Viscount Ridley (nephew); Nicholas Ridley (nephew)
- Writing career
- Pen name: Esther Wyndham
- Language: English
- Genres: Biography, romantic fiction

Edith Penelope Mary Lutyens (pseudonym Esther Wyndham; 31 July 1908 – 9 April 1999) was a British author who is principally known for her biographical works on the philosopher Jiddu Krishnamurti.

== Early life ==
Mary Lutyens was born in London, the fourth and youngest daughter of the architect Edwin Lutyens, and his wife, Emily, the daughter of Robert Bulwer-Lytton, 1st Earl of Lytton, Viceroy of India, and the granddaughter of the writer and politician Edward Bulwer-Lytton, 1st Baron Lytton. Mary was the younger sister of the composer Elisabeth Lutyens, and aunt of the 4th Viscount Ridley and the politician Nicholas Ridley.

As a child, Lutyens spent time with her maternal grandmother Edith, the former vicereine, who lived at Knebworth, thirty miles from London, with her daughter the suffragette Constance Bulwer-Lytton. Edwin Lutyens had designed a dower house for his mother-in-law called Homewood.

As a result of her mother's interest in theosophy, Lutyens met Krishnamurti when she was a child: she knew him from 1911 until his death in 1986.

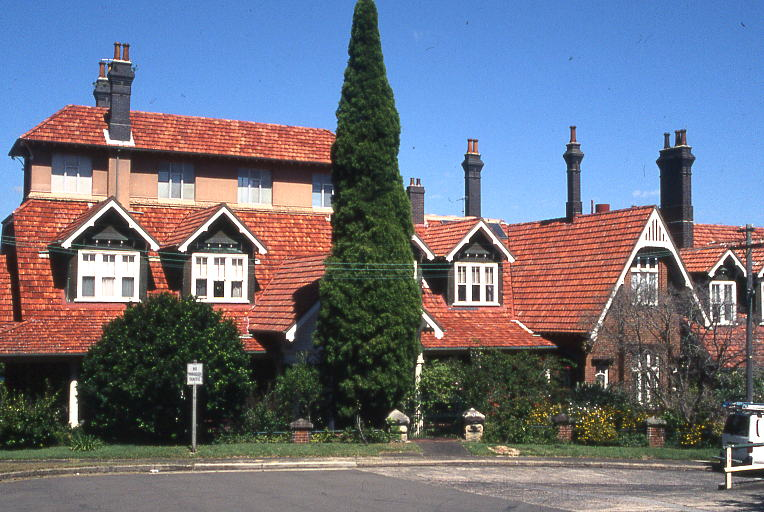
The Manor, Mosman, New South Wales, Australia

In the 1920s, her father was working on his buildings at Delhi. Lutyens visited India with her mother and went to Australia, staying at The Manor, a centre run by Charles Webster Leadbeater in Mosman, New South Wales, while Krishnamurti and his brother Nitya stayed at another house nearby. Lutyens stayed there for some time, which eventually provided her with material for her book Krishnamurti: The Years of Awakening.

== Career ==
Apart from her works on Krishnamurti, Lutyens wrote biographies of John Ruskin, Effie Gray and her own family. In her book Millais and the Ruskins she put forward the controversial argument that Ruskin could not consummate his marriage because he was repelled by his wife's pubic hair.

She wrote novels under the pseudonym "Esther Wyndham" for the Mills & Boon and Harlequin Romance imprints.

== Personal life ==
Lutyens married twice. Her first marriage, in 1930, to Anthony Rupert Herbert Franklin Sewell, a stockbroker, produced one daughter, Amanda Lutyens Sewell, but ended in divorce in 1945. Her second marriage, in 1945, was to Joseph Gluckstein Links, art historian and royal furrier, and ended with his death in 1997.

Lutyens was interviewed, in April 1976, by the historian, Brian Harrison, as part of the Suffrage Interviews project, titled Oral evidence on the suffragette and suffragist movements: the Brian Harrison interviews. She spoke about her aunt the suffragette, Constance Bulwer-Lytton, whose views contrasted with those of Edith, Mary's mother, who disapproved of militancy in the suffrage movement. She also spoke about her mother's interest in Theosophy and in India. (The series also includes an interview with Elisabeth Lutyens which covers some similar ground).

== Works ==
- Perchance to Dream, London: John Murray, 1935.
- To be young : some chapters of autobiography, London: R. Hart-Davies, 1959 OCLC 568002749, 1989 edition: ISBN 9780552993364
- Effie in Venice: Effie Ruskin's Letters Home 1849–1852, London: John Murray, 1965, Pallas Athene (UK), 2001 edition: ISBN 1-873429-33-9.
- Millais and the Ruskins, London: John Murray, 1967, Vanguard Press in USA.
- Cleo, London: Michael Joseph, 1973.
- Krishnamurti: The Years of Awakening, London: John Murray, 1975, Shambhala Publications reprint edition 1997: ISBN 1-57062-288-4. First installment of a three-volume biography, covers the period from Krishnamurti's birth in 1895 to 1933.
- Krishnamurti: The Years of Fulfilment, London: John Murray, 1983, ISBN 0-7195-3979-X, Farrar, Straus, Giroux paperback: ISBN 0-374-18224-8, Avon Books 1991 reprint with US spelling "Fulfillment": ISBN 0-380-71112-5. Second volume of the Krishnamurti biography, covers the years from 1933 to 1980.
- Krishnamurti: The Open Door, London: John Murray, 1988, ISBN 0-7195-4534-X. Final volume of biography covers years 1980 to 1986, the end of Krishnamurti's life.
- The Lyttons in India: An account of Lord Lytton's Viceroyalty, 1876–1880 London: John Murray, 1979, ISBN 0-7195-3677-4.
- Edwin Lutyens: A Memoir, Academic Pr Canada Ltd, 1980, ISBN 0-7195-3777-0, Black Swan, 1991 revised edition: ISBN 0-552-99417-0.
- The Life and Death of Krishnamurti, London: John Murray, 1990, ISBN 0-7195-4749-0, Nesma Books India 1999: ISBN 81-87075-44-9, ISBN 0-900506-22-9, also published as Krishnamurti: His Life and Death, St Martins Press 1991: ISBN 0-312-05455-6, an abridgement of her trilogy on Krishnamurti's life.
- The Boy Krishna, 1995, Krishnamurti Foundation Trust paperback: ISBN 0-900506-13-X. Subtitled, "The First Fourteen Years in the Life of J. Krishnamurti".
- Krishnamurti and the Rajagopals, 1996, Ojai, CA: Krishnamurti Foundation of America, ISBN 1-888004-08-8.
- J. Krishnamurti: A Life, 2005, Penguin Books India, ISBN 0-14-400006-7. This book is a compilation of The Years of Awakening, The Years of Fulfilment, and The Open Door.
