= Jasper Ridley (banker) =

British barrister, banker, and agriculturalist (1887–1951)

Hon. Sir Jasper Nicholas Ridley KCVO OBE (6 January 1887 – 1 October 1951) was a British barrister, banker, and agriculturalist. He was also chairman of the Trustees of the Tate Gallery and a Trustee of the British Museum and of the National Gallery.

== Early life ==
The second son of Matthew White Ridley, 1st Viscount Ridley, Home Secretary in Lord Salisbury's government, by his marriage to the Hon. Mary Georgiana Marjoribanks, a daughter of Dudley Marjoribanks, 1st Baron Tweedmouth, and Isabella Weir Hogg, Ridley was educated at Eton and Balliol College, Oxford, proceeding MA in 1908.

== Career ==
In early life, Ridley twice stood for parliament as a Unionist: at the January 1910 election at Morpeth, and at the December 1910 election at Newcastle. He was called to the bar in 1912. During the Great War of 1914–1918, he served with the Northumberland Hussars Yeomanry, was mentioned in despatches, appointed a Chevalier of the Legion of Honour, and became Deputy Assistant Adjutant-General. After the war he was Secretary of the Ministry of Labour's Training Grants Committee from 1919 to 1920.

Entering the banking profession, Ridley rose to become chairman of Coutts & Co. and of the National Provincial Bank. He was also President of the London Life Association and a director of the Standard Bank of South Africa and of the Bank of British West Africa.

In the 1930s, Ridley was a member of the Reorganisation Commission for Pigs and Pig Products (1932) and then of another for the Fat Stock Industry (1933–1934). In 1937 he was appointed to the Livestock Commission, and he also served on the Royal Commission on Equal Pay for Equal Work.

General election December 1910: Newcastle-upon-Tyne (2 seats)
Party	Candidate	Votes	%	±%
Liberal	Edward Shortt	16,599	28.1	−0.8
Labour	Walter Hudson	16,447	28.0	−0.1
Conservative	Edward Clark	12,915	22.0	+0.4
Conservative	Jasper Nicholas Ridley	12,849	21.9	+0.5
Turnout			78.3	−7.8
Majority		3,684	6.1	−1.2
Liberal hold		Swing	−0.6	
Majority		3,532	6.0	−0.5
Labour hold		Swing	−0.3	

== Private life ==
Jasper Ridley married on 28 April 1911 in London Countess Nathalie Louise von Benckendorff (20 May 1886 – 14 March 1968; German: Natalie Luise Gräfin von Benckendorff), daughter of Count Alexander von Benckendorff, Russian Ambassador to the Court of St James's between 1903 and 1917, and they had four sons and one daughter:

- Catherine Sophie Ridley (19 March 1912 – 18 March 1976), married Eugene Lampert
- Jasper Alexander Maurice Ridley (20 April 1913 – 13 December 1943), married Helen Laura Cressida Bonham-Carter (aunt of Helena Bonham Carter)
- Constantine Anthony Ridley (9 March 1916 – 24 February 1970)
- Oliver John Ridley (14 October 1918 – 1992)
- Patrick Conrad Peter Ridley (17 March 1931 – 11 May 1952)

Their son Jasper was the father of the economist Adam Ridley. At the time of Ridley's death his addresses were given in Who's Who as 4 Gloucester Place, Portman Square, London W1, and Mockbeggars, Claydon, Suffolk.

Outside business, Ridley was a Justice of the Peace for Suffolk, a Fellow of Eton College, chairman of the Trustees of the Tate Gallery, a Trustee of the National Gallery, and from 1947 a Trustee of the British Museum. He was a member of the Travellers, Beefsteak, and Turf clubs.

== Honours ==
- Chevalier of the Legion of Honour (France), 1918
- Officer of the Order of the British Empire, 1919
- Knight Commander of the Royal Victorian Order, 1946 Birthday Honours
