= Northumberland Hussars =

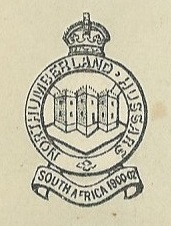
- Cap badge
- Active: 1819–present
- Country: United Kingdom
- Branch: British Army
- Type: Yeomanry
- Role: Formation reconnaissance
- Size: One Squadron
- Part of: Royal Armoured Corps
- Garrison/HQ: Newcastle upon Tyne
- Nickname: The Noodles
- Engagements: Second Boer War; First World War France and Flanders 1914–18 Second World War North Africa 1941–43 Greece 1941 Middle East 1941–43 Sicily 1943 North-West Europe 1944–45
- Battle honours: See battle honours below

Commanders
- Honorary Colonel: Lt Col Thomas Faifax, TD
- Notable commanders: Charles Loftus Bates

The Northumberland Hussars was a Yeomanry regiment of the British Army, transferred to the Royal Artillery for the duration of the Second World War. It was disbanded as an independent Territorial Army unit in 1967, a time when the strength of the Territorial Army was greatly reduced. The regiment's name lives on in the title of the command and support squadron of the Queen's Own Yeomanry (QOY), a Formation Reconnaissance Regiment based in Newcastle upon Tyne.

== History ==
=== Formation and early history ===
In 1794, King George III was on the throne, William Pitt the Younger was Prime Minister of Great Britain and, across the Channel, Britain was faced by a French nation that had recently guillotined its King and possessed a revolutionary army numbering half a million men. The Prime Minister proposed that the Counties form a force of Volunteer Yeoman Cavalry that could be called upon by the King to defend the country against invasion or by the Lord Lieutenant to subdue any civil disorder within the country.

However, it was not until 1819 that The Newcastle Regiment of Yeomanry Cavalry was raised. Shortly afterward, in 1831, the regiment was used against its own countrymen, putting down the miners' strikes of that year. In 1849 an Army Riding School was established in Northumberland Road for the use of the regiment. In 1876, the regiment was renamed the Northumberland (Hussars) Yeomanry Cavalry.

=== Second Boer War ===
The Yeomanry was not intended to serve overseas, but due to the string of defeats during Black Week in December 1899, the British government realized they were going to need more troops than just the regular army. A Royal Warrant was issued on 24 December 1899 to allow volunteer forces to serve in the Second Boer War. The Royal Warrant asked standing Yeomanry regiments to provide service companies of approximately 115 men each for the Imperial Yeomanry equipped as Mounted infantry. The regiment provided:

- 14th (Northumberland) Company, 5th Battalion in 1900
- 15th (Northumberland) Company, 5th Battalion in 1900
- 55th (Northumberland) Company, 14th Battalion in 1900, transferred to 5th Battalion in 1902
- 100th (Northumberland) Company, 5th Battalion in 1901
- 101st (Northumberland) Company, 5th Battalion in 1901
- 105th (Northumberland) Company, 5th Battalion in 1901
- 110th (Northumberland) Company, 2nd Battalion in 1901

The mounted infantry experiment was considered a success and the regiment was designated the Northumberland Imperial Yeomanry (Hussars) from 1901 to 1908.

=== First World War ===
In accordance with the Territorial and Reserve Forces Act 1907 (7 Edw. 7, c.9) which brought the Territorial Force into being, the TF was intended to be a home defence force for service during wartime and members could not be compelled to serve outside the country. However, on the outbreak of war on 4 August 1914, many members volunteered for Imperial Service. Therefore, TF units were split in August and September 1914 into 1st Line (liable for overseas service) and 2nd Line (home service for those unable or unwilling to serve overseas) units. Later, a 3rd Line was formed to act as a reserve, providing trained replacements for the 1st and 2nd Line regiments.

==== 1/1st Northumberland Hussars ====
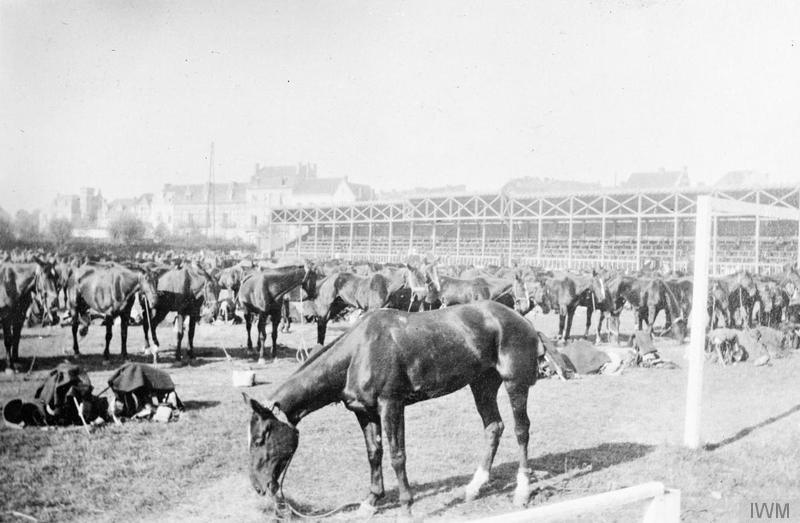
Horse lines of the Northumberland Hussars, Bruges, October 1914 (IWM Q50713)

The 1st Line regiment was mobilised in August 1914, at the Army Riding School in Newcastle upon Tyne, and attached to the Yorkshire Mounted Brigade. In September, it joined the 7th Infantry Division at Lyndhurst. On 6 October it landed at Zeebrugge with the division. In April 1915, the regiment was split up

- Regimental Headquarters and A Squadron remained with the 7th Division
- B Squadron joined the 1st Division
- C Squadron joined the 8th Division

This lasted until May 1916, when the squadrons were reunited in France to act as the Cavalry unit for XIII Corps. The regiment would then move between Corps, being attached to the VIII Corps in August 1917, III Corps in November 1917 and, finally, XII Corps in October 1918 where it remained until the end of the war.

==== 2/1st Northumberland Hussars ====
The 2nd Line regiment was formed in October 1914. In April 1916, the regiment was split up:

- Regimental Headquarters and B Squadron joined the 62nd (2nd West Riding) Division
- A Squadron operated as an independent unit based in Scarborough
- C Squadron joined the 59th (2nd North Midland) Division

In February 1917, the regiment reassembled and, on 19 March 1917, it moved to France, where it constituted XIX Corps Cavalry Regiment a few days later. It was the only 2nd Line Yeomanry regiment to be posted overseas on active service in the First World War. (Note: Other 2nd Line yeomanry regiments sent individual squadrons to France, for example, the 2/1st Northamptonshire Yeomanry.) On 28 August 1917, the regiment moved to Étaples for infantry training; this completed on 25 September, at which time the unit amalgamated with the 9th (Service) Battalion, Northumberland Fusiliers as the 9th (Northumberland Hussars) Battalion, Northumberland Fusiliers.

==== 3/1st Northumberland Hussars ====
The 3rd Line regiment was formed at Gosforth Park in February 1915 and then move to Stocksfield-on-Tyne. In the summer, it was affiliated to the 5th Reserve Cavalry Regiment at York. In January 1917, it was absorbed into the 5th Reserve Cavalry Regiment at Tidworth.

==== Menin Gate ====
Four Northumberland Hussars, who died in the First World War and have no known grave, are commemorated on panel 5 of the Menin Gate. A fifth, Shoeing Smith G. Stephenson, was added to Panel 60 in 2017.

=== Between the wars ===
Post war, a commission was set up to consider the shape of the Territorial Force (Territorial Army from 1 October 1921). The experience of the First World War made it clear that cavalry was surfeit. The commission decided that only the 14 most senior regiments were to be retained as cavalry (though the Lovat Scouts and the Scottish Horse were also to remain mounted as "scouts"). Eight regiments were converted to Armoured Car Companies of the Royal Tank Corps (RTC), one was reduced to a battery in another regiment, one was absorbed into a local infantry battalion, one became a signals regiment and two were disbanded. The remaining 25 regiments were converted to brigades (Note: The basic organic unit of the Royal Artillery was, and is, the Battery. When grouped together they formed brigades, in the same way that infantry battalions or cavalry regiments were grouped together in brigades. At the outbreak of the First World War, a field artillery brigade of headquarters (4 officers, 37 other ranks), three batteries (5 and 193 each), and a brigade ammunition column (4 and 154) had a total strength just under 800 so was broadly comparable to an infantry battalion (just over 1,000) or a cavalry regiment (about 550). Like an infantry battalion, an artillery brigade was usually commanded by a Lieutenant-Colonel. Artillery brigades were redesignated as regiments in 1938.) of the Royal Field Artillery between 1920 and 1922. As the 14th most senior regiment in the order of precedence, the regiment was retained as horsed cavalry.

=== Second World War ===
In February 1940, the regiment transferred to the Royal Artillery (RA) as the 102nd Light Anti-Aircraft and Anti-Tank Regiment, RA (Northumberland Hussars); two batteries were equipped with 2 pounder Anti-Tank Guns (2pdr A/Tk Guns), the other two were light anti-aircraft (LAA) batteries. (Note: It should not be confused with 102nd Light Anti-Aircraft Regiment, Royal Artillery, formed from a battalion of the Lincolnshire Regiment in 1941.) Following conversion, the regiment joined the 2nd Armoured Division's 2nd Support Group.

In October 1940, the division set sail for the Middle East, arriving in the new year. Two months later, the 'Hussars' converted to a three-battery anti-tank regiment, with one LAA battery re-equipping with 2-pdrs and the other, 'A' Battery, transferring to 25th LAA Regiment, in which it served as 274 (Northumberland Hussars) LAA Battery until the end of the war. Following the conversion, the regiment was unofficially considered to be a Royal Horse Artillery unit.

In April 1941, the 'Hussars', and other elements from the 2nd Support Group, joined the 1st Armoured Brigade for Operation Lustre, (the move to Greece). At this time, the regiment had a strength of 578 men, 168 vehicles and 48 x 2pdrs.

After their arrival, the regiment was deployed to hold the Metamorphos Pass in conjunction with the Greek Horse Artillery. On 22 April, they were subjected to dive bombing and tank attacks. Together with their New Zealand allies, the 'Hussars' acted as a rearguard. After a 12-hour battle and a 160-mile march through the night, they reached Athens on 25 April. The next day, they headed off to the nearby Rafina Beach and waited to be evacuated, having by now destroyed their guns and equipment. Most of the unit landed at Suda on the island of Crete. However, some elements were evacuated to Alexandria.

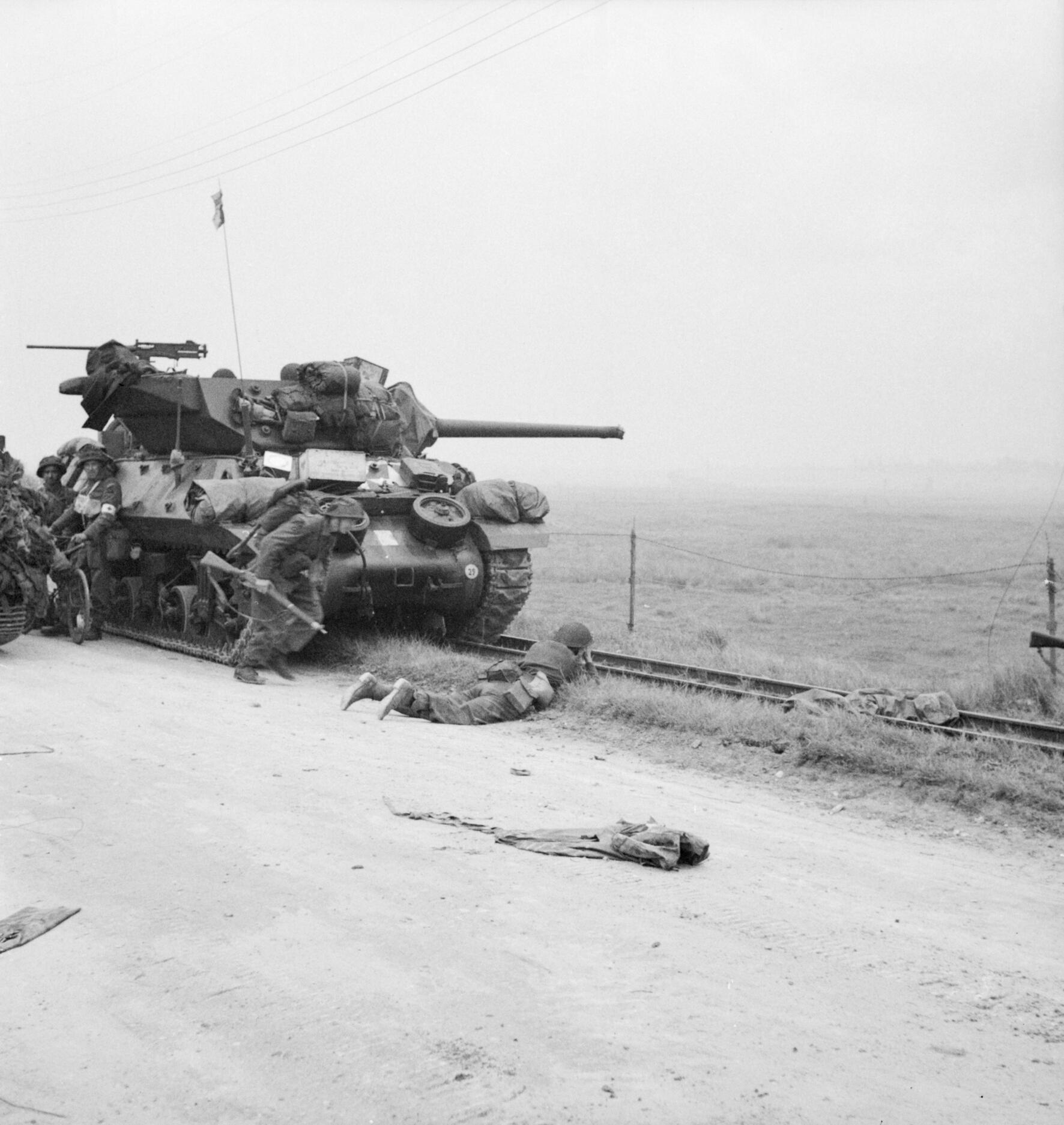
Troops take shelter near an M10 tank destroyer, used by 102nd (Northumberland Hussars) Anti-Tank Regiment; 6 June 1944

On the island, they were equipped with rifles and tasked to fight as infantry on the Akrotiri Peninsula between Canea and Suda. On 15 May, they again came under air attack; 11 German gliders also landed in the regimental area. By 26 May, the peninsula was under allied control and the gliders had all been destroyed. On 27 May, the allies decided to evacuate Crete; the regiment had to withdraw across the mountains from the town of Suda to the evacuation beaches at Sphakia, a distance of 50 miles. Many troops did get away, but owing to heavy shipping losses, the embarkation was stopped on 31 May and over 200 men from the regiment were left behind and ordered to surrender to the advancing German forces.

Evacuated to Egypt, the regiment began re-equipping and was brought back up to strength with men from the 106th (Lancashire Hussars) Regiment, Royal Horse Artillery, which unit had been suspended due to losses incurred in the fighting on Crete. In addition, the Fourth Rhodesian Anti-Tank Battery, Southern Rhodesia Artillery was incorporated into the regiment as D Battery for the remainder of the North Africa campaign. The 102nd was attached to the 7th Armoured Division for Operation Crusader, in November 1941. By February 1942, the 'Hussars' had moved to the 1st Armoured Division, with whom they participated in the Battle of Gazala. In October 1942, they became part of the 50th (Northumbrian) Infantry Division, with whom they took part in the Second Battle of El Alamein and fought in Sicily.

In October 1943, the highly experienced 50th Infantry Division set sail for England, arriving at Liverpool on 5 November 1943; the regiment had returned to the UK after an absence of almost three years. The Northumberland Hussars were, by this stage, a very experienced unit with six major battles, including two amphibious landings under their belts. They were an obvious choice to be placed at the forefront of Operation Overlord, the D-Day landings. For the next six months, they joined thousands of allied servicemen training in Britain for the assault on the French Coast.

In preparation for the assault, the Northumberland Hussars equipped their 99th and 288th batteries with eight 6pdrs and four M10 SP A/Tk Guns – a normal infantry division A/Tk battery had four 6pdrs and eight 17pdrs. In addition, the regiment was reinforced by the 198th and 234th SP A/Tk Batteries (both with 12 M10s), which were detached from XXX Corps's 73rd Anti-Tank Regiment RA.

The 50th (Northumbrian) Infantry Division was to assault Gold Beach with the 69th and 231st Infantry Brigades. The 69th Brigade, supported by the 99th battery, would land at La Rivière and move south toward Crépon and Creully to Saint-Léger, which was on the strategically important Bayeux–Caen road. The 231st Brigade would be supported by the 234th SP and 288th batteries. The 198th SP Battery was scheduled to land six hours after the first assault.

Once the leading brigades had secured their objectives, they were to consolidate their position with the help of the 'Hussars' two other batteries. Meanwhile, the follow-up infantry Brigades (the 151st and the independent 56th, which had been attached to the division for the assault) would continue the push inland, supported by the 8th Armoured Brigade and the rest of the anti-tank units.

The 50th Infantry Division was considered to have performed very well in Normandy; out of the three divisions that were veterans of the desert (the others being 7th Armoured Division and 51st (Highland) Infantry Division), it was considered to have performed the best. It was one of the driving forces behind the British advance, but was exhausted by the end of the battle. It later played a minor role in Operation Market Garden, where the 231st Infantry Brigade was detached to help support the advance of the Guards Armoured Division.

In December 1944, when the rest of the division returned to Britain, the Northumberland Hussars remained in Northern Europe as part of the 15th (Lowland) Infantry Division, with which it remained until the end of the war.

=== Post war ===
The regiment was disbanded from Regular service in the Royal Artillery and returned to the TA Order of battle in 1946 when it was equipped with Cruiser Tanks as the 50th (Northumbrian) Divisional Reconnaissance Regiment and re-occupied the Army Riding School. The regimental headquarters and 'A' Squadron moved to Debden Gardens in Heaton, Newcastle upon Tyne in 1954.

After the formation of the TAVR in 1967, the regiment was reduced to cadre strength at the Barrack Road drill hall in 1969. The unit was then reformed as Headquarters Squadron (The Northumberland Hussars), the Queen's Own Yeomanry at Fenham Barracks, Newcastle upon Tyne and equipped with Ferret and Alvis Saracen Armoured Cars in 1971. The Northumberland Hussars designation was preserved on the formation of 'D' Squadron (The Northumberland Hussars) at Fox Barracks in Cramlington, Northumberland in 1986: the squadron was equipped with Fox armoured reconnaissance vehicles.

In 1999 'D' Squadron and Headquarters Squadron amalgamated to form 'D' Squadron, (The Northumberland Hussars) at Fenham Barracks and the amalgamated squadron was equipped with CVR(T) Sabre and then FV107 Scimitar Tracked Armoured Reconnaissance vehicles. Then 'D' Squadron changed its name with Army 2020 to form command and support Squadron (The Northumberland Hussars) Queen's Own Yeomanry, equipped with the Land Rover RWMIK in 2014.

== Regimental museum ==
The Newcastle Discovery Museum includes the regimental museum of the Light Dragoons and the Northumberland Hussars.

== Battle honours ==
The Northumberland Hussars was awarded the following battle honours (honours in bold are emblazoned on the regimental colours):

Second Boer War	**South Africa 1900–02**	Honorary Distinction from the Second World War, awarded to the Shropshire Yeomanry for service as a Royal Artillery regiment. The Northumberland Hussars Honorary Distinction was similar.
First World War	**Ypres 1914**, **Langemarck 1914**, **Gheluvelt**, **Neuve Chapelle**, **Loos**, **Cambrai 1917**, **Somme 1918**, St. Quentin, **Albert 1918**, Selle, **Sambre**, **France and Flanders 1914–18**	Honorary Distinction from the Second World War, awarded to the Shropshire Yeomanry for service as a Royal Artillery regiment. The Northumberland Hussars Honorary Distinction was similar.
Second World War	The Royal Artillery was present in nearly all battles and would have earned most of the honours awarded to cavalry and infantry regiments. In 1833, William IV awarded the motto Ubique (meaning "everywhere") in place of all battle honours. Honorary Distinction: Badge of the Royal Regiment of Artillery with year-dates "1940–45" and five scrolls: "North Africa", "Greece", "Middle East", "Sicily", "North-West Europe"	Honorary Distinction from the Second World War, awarded to the Shropshire Yeomanry for service as a Royal Artillery regiment. The Northumberland Hussars Honorary Distinction was similar.

== Uniform ==
Prior to World War I the regiment wore a dark blue review order modelled on that of the regular hussar regiments of the British Army. However the six bands of braid across the front of the tunic were silver for officers and white for other ranks. Officers had red morocco shoulder belts, while troopers wore leather bandoliers. The historic fur busbies, with white over red plumes, were issued to all ranks for special occasions such as coronation parades. Dark blue overalls (tight fitting cavalry trousers) with double white stripes were worn for off duty wear and dismounted parades. After 1914 the Northumberland Hussars wore the standard khaki service dress with regimental insignia for nearly all occasions.

== Notable Old Comrades ==
- John French, 1st Earl of Ypres (1852–1925), became regimental adjutant in 1881: later Field-Marshal
- Lawrence Johnston (1871–1958), creator of Hidcote Manor Garden, which is now in the care of the National Trust; Second Boer War and First World War
- William Henry Armstrong Fitzpatrick Watson-Armstrong, 1st Baron Armstrong; First World War
- Stanley Norman Evans (1898–1970) was a British industrialist and Labour Party politician; First World War
- Hugh Percy, 10th Duke of Northumberland; Second World War
- Lord Richard Percy; Post-War and Lieutenant-Colonel commanding 1958-61
- (Harry) John Neville Vane, 11th Baron Barnard (1923-2016) of Barnard Castle, Lieutenant-Colonel 1964–1966; Post-War
- Matthew White Ridley, 2nd Viscount Ridley, Conservative politician, rose to Lieutenant-Colonel commanding 1913–1915
- Matthew White Ridley, 4th Viscount Ridley, Brevet Colonel in the Northumberland Hussars, he would become Honorary Colonel in 1979; Post-War
- Nicholas Ridley, Baron Ridley of Liddesdale (1929–1993), Post-War, rose to Captain.

== See also ==
- Imperial Yeomanry
- List of Yeomanry Regiments 1908
- Yeomanry
- Yeomanry order of precedence
- British yeomanry during the First World War
- Second line yeomanry regiments of the British Army
- List of British Army Yeomanry Regiments converted to Royal Artillery

== Bibliography ==
- Barnes, B.S. (2008). The Sign of the Double 'T' (The 50th Northumbrian Division – July 1943 to December 1944). Market Weighton: Sentinel Press. ISBN 978-0-9534262-0-1.
- Delaforce, Patrick (2004). Monty's Northern Legions. 50th Northumbrian and 15th Scottish Divisions at War 1939-1945. Stroud: Sutton Publishing Ltd. ISBN 9780750935562.
- Forty, George (2004). Battle Zone Normandy: Villers Bocage. London: Sutton Publishing. ISBN 0-7509-3012-8.
- Hewitson, T.L. (2006). Weekend Warriors from Tyne to Tweed. Stoud: Tempus Publishing Limited. ISBN 0-7524-3756-9.
- James, Brigadier E.A. (1978). British Regiments 1914–18. London: Samson Books Limited. ISBN 0-906304-03-2.
- Joslen, Lt-Col H.F. (1990) [1st. Pub. HMSO:1960]. Orders of Battle, Second World War, 1939–1945. London: London Stamp Exchange. ISBN 0-948130-03-2.
- Mileham, Patrick (1994). The Yeomanry Regiments; 200 Years of Tradition. Edinburgh: Canongate Academic. ISBN 1-898410-36-4.
- Rinaldi, Richard A (2008). Order of Battle of the British Army 1914. Ravi Rikhye. ISBN 978-0-9776072-8-0.
