= Eugene Lampert =

Scholar of Russian history and theology (1914–2004)

- Born: 1 September 1914
- Died: 22 September 2004 (aged 90)
- Known for: Scholarship of Russia
- Spouse: Katherine Ridley (m. 1942)
- Children: 2

Eugene Lampert (September 1 1914 – September 22 2004) was a scholar of Russian history and theology.

== Selected works ==
- The Divine Realm, Towards a Theology of the Sacraments (1945)
- The Apocalypse of History (1948)
- Studies in Rebellion (1957)
- Sons Against Fathers: Studies in Russian Radicalism and Revolution (1965)
