= William J. H. Boetcker =

German-American minister

William John Henry Boetcker (1873–1962) was an American religious leader, influential public speaker, and outspoken political conservative.

== Biography ==
Boetcker was born in Altona, Hamburg, Germany on July 17, 1873, one of four children. At age 17, Boetcker became Germany's youngest published author. This attracted the attention of the Countess Mary von Waldersee, who paid for Boetcker's steamship passage to the United States.

Boetcker enrolled in the Chicago Theological Seminary and, two years later, transferred to the German Theological School (now Bloomfield College) in Bloomfield, New Jersey, where he graduated in 1897. He was ordained as a minister in 1897.

In 1898, Boetcker became pastor of his first church, the German Reformed Church in Brooklyn, New York. It was there he met Anna Albrecht, the church organist, whom he married in 1899. The couple remained married until Anna's death in 1957, raising seven children and having 14 grandchildren.

In 1902, Boetcker became the pastor of the First German Presbyterian Church in Shelbyville, Indiana. Conflict with local labor agitators led Boetcker to start a Shelbyville Citizens Alliance that promoted labor peace, and to move away from the active pulpit.

The National Association of Manufacturers offered Boetcker a role in the organization of a Citizens' Alliance, leading to the formation of the Citizens Industrial Association (CIA). In 1905, Boetcker moved to Toledo, Ohio to serve as the secretary of its Toledo chapter. In 1914, he moved to Pittsburgh, Pennsylvania to address labor strife in the steel industry.

In 1919, Boetcker moved to Geneva, Ohio and ran speaking and publishing businesses out of Erie, Pennsylvania for the rest of his life. Boetcker often used the pen name "Tianus Tiorio," acronyms that stood for "Truth in a Nutshell" and "Think It Over. Reason It Out!" He also used the pen name "Civis Americanus".

Boetcker is sometimes considered the forerunner of such contemporary "success coaches" as Anthony Robbins. He is widely credited with coining the phrase, "A man is judged by the company he keeps, and a company is judged by the men it keeps, and the people of Democratic nations are judged by the type and caliber of officers they elect.”

== The Ten Cannots ==
In 1916, Boetcker authored a pamphlet entitled The Ten Cannots that emphasized individual freedom, frugality, and responsibility to oneself. Publications exhibit minor variations, but a typical version appears below:

- You cannot bring about prosperity by discouraging thrift.
- You cannot strengthen the weak by weakening the strong.
- You cannot help little men by tearing down big men.
- You cannot lift the wage earner by pulling down the wage payer.
- You cannot help the poor by destroying the rich.
- You cannot establish sound security on borrowed money.
- You cannot further the brotherhood of man by inciting class hatred.
- You cannot keep out of trouble by spending more than you earn.
- You cannot build character and courage by destroying men's initiative and independence.
- And you cannot help men permanently by doing for them what they can and should do for themselves.

This text is often misattributed to Abraham Lincoln. The error apparently stems from a leaflet printed in 1942 by a conservative political organization called the Committee for Constitutional Government. The leaflet bore the title "Lincoln on Limitations" and contained some genuine Lincoln quotations on one side and The Ten Cannots on the other, with the attributions switched. The mistake of crediting Lincoln for The Ten Cannots has been repeated, notably by Ronald Reagan in his address to the 1992 Republican National Convention in Houston, and by John Kasich on Fox News Sunday in 2015.

Boetcker also spoke of the "Seven National Crimes":

- I don't think.
- I don't know.
- I don't care.
- I am too busy.
- I leave well enough alone.
- I have no time to read and find out.
- I am not interested.
