= Blagdon Hall =

Country house in Northumberland, England

Coordinates: 55°5′14.47″N 1°39′50.23″W

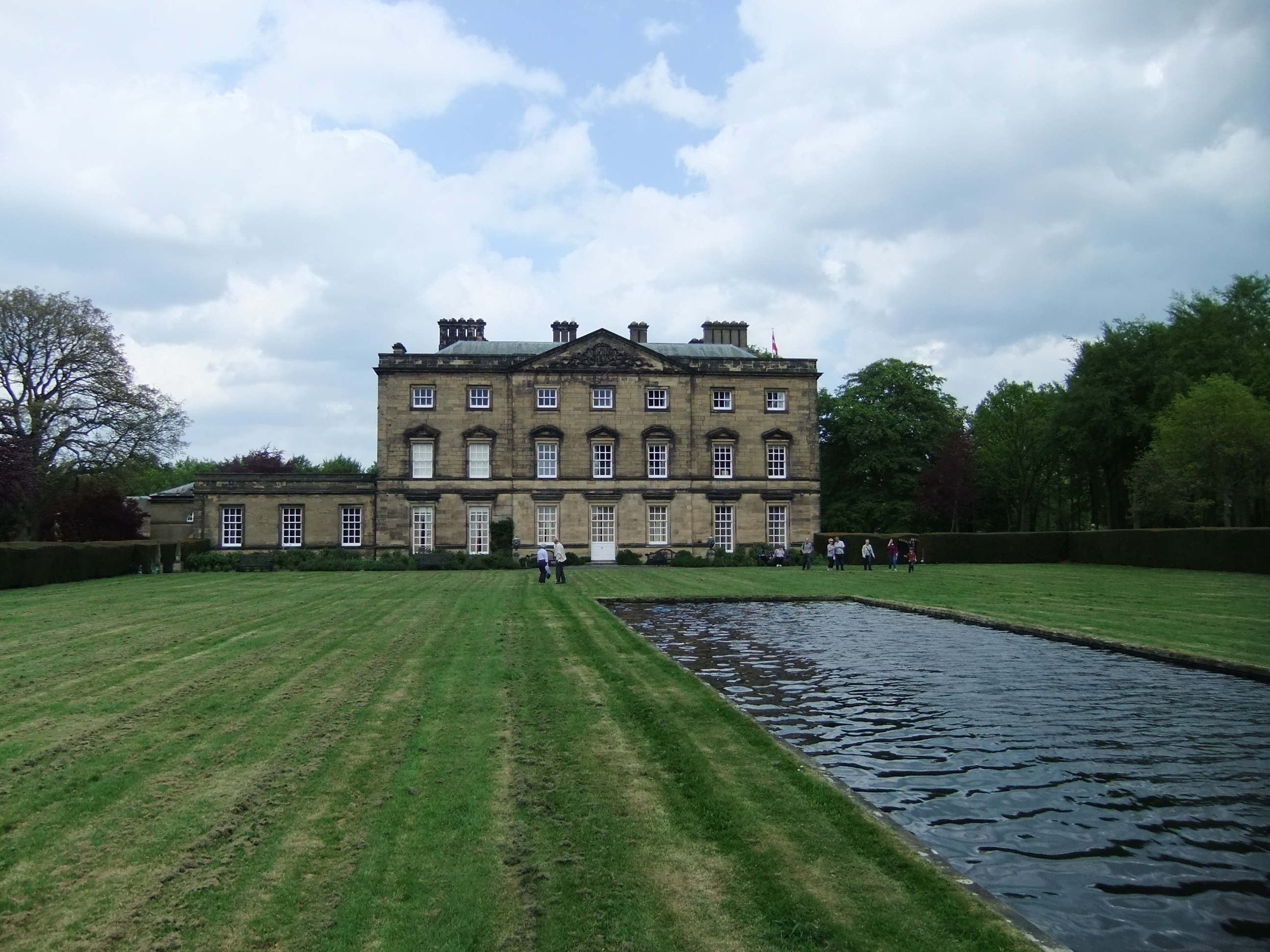
Blagdon Hall

Blagdon Hall (grid reference NZ21557705) is a privately owned English country house and Grade I listed building at the Blagdon estate near Cramlington in Northumberland. The estate has been in the ownership of the White Ridley family since 1698. Its present owner is the science writer and hereditary peer Matt Ridley, the 5th Viscount Ridley.

The house was originally built in two phases between roughly 1720 and 1752, first by Matthew White and later by his son, Sir Matthew White, 1st Baronet. His sister Elizabeth married Matthew Ridley (1711–1778), who served four terms as Mayor of Newcastle upon Tyne. Their son, Sir Matthew White Ridley, 2nd Baronet, inherited the estate after the 1st Baronet’s death in 1763. Blagdon Hall was substantially enlarged in the nineteenth century to designs by the architects John Dobson and Ignatius Bonomi. Some of these additions were removed following a fire in 1944.

The gardens were extensively remodelled in the 1930s by Sir Edwin Lutyens, whose daughter Ursula was married to Matthew White Ridley, 3rd Viscount Ridley.

The stable block designed by James Wyatt in Palladian style in 1791 is Grade II* listed and a 19th-century folly in the grounds is Grade II listed. The gardens also contain the only surviving bronze of John Graham Lough's gigantic statue of Milo of Croton.

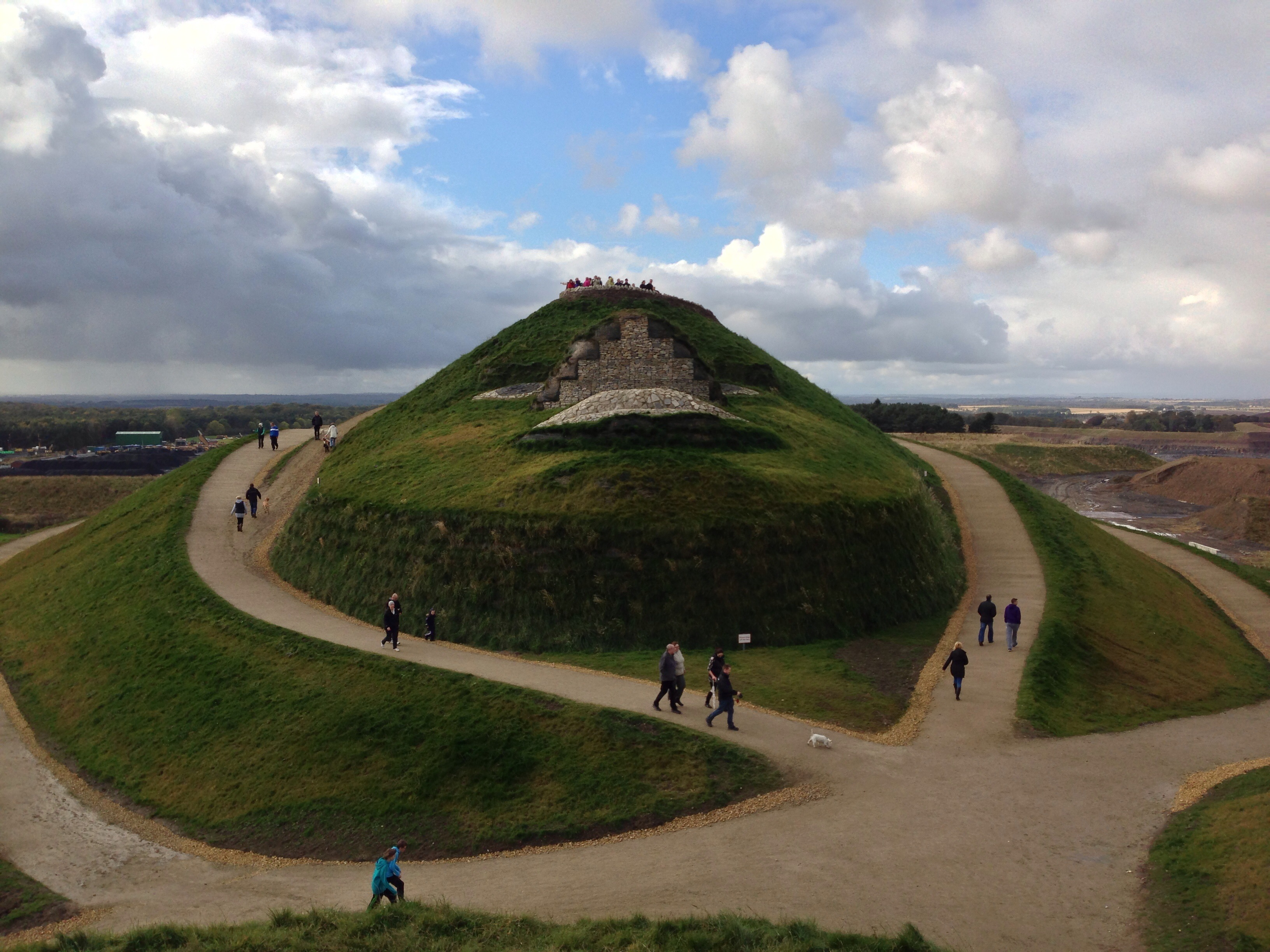
Northumberlandia - facial shot showing mouth, nostrils, etc.

On the estate is Shotton Surface Mine, a large open cast coal mine and Northumberlandia (the "Lady of the North"), a huge land sculpture in the shape of a reclining female figure made from mining waste. The Royal Agricultural Society of England awarded the Bledisloe Gold Medal in 2015 to Ridley as they "wanted to highlight the extensive environmental improvement work that has been undertaken across the land".
