= Dove Marine Laboratory =

British research and teaching laboratory

Coordinates: 55.035°N 1.4326°W

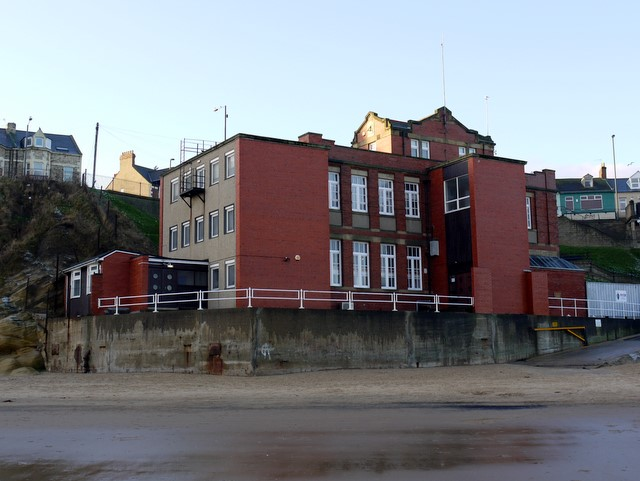
- Established: 1897
- Research type: Marine research and teaching
- Faculty: Faculty of Science, Agriculture and Engineering
- Location: Cullercoats, North Shields, Tyne and Wear, NE30 4PZ
- Affiliations: Newcastle University
- Website: ncl.ac.uk/nes/about-us/facilities/marine/dove-marine-lab/

The Dove Marine Laboratory is a research and teaching laboratory which forms part of the School of Natural and Environmental Sciences within Newcastle University in the United Kingdom.

== History ==
The original Laboratory was established in October 1897. It comprised a small wooden hut sited next to the Saltwater Baths on Cullercoats Bay, and was used by Armstrong College to study the waters of the north east UK coastline.

On the 28 March 1904 the Laboratory and Baths were destroyed by fire, but it was agreed that the work of the Laboratory should continue. In 1906 the local landowner, geologist Wilfred Hudleston, FRS, offered not only to make the site of the old Baths available for newer, larger, facilities, but also offered to finance their construction. He was reluctant to publicise his generosity, and asked that the building be named after one of his ancestors, Eleanor Dove, when it was opened by the Duke of Northumberland on 29 September 1908. The building was designed by the architect Joseph John Lish, an expert in ecclesiastical work, but also in the use of concrete. In 2008 the laboratory celebrated its centenary, where the current Duke of Northumberland led festivities.

The Laboratory became a department of Armstrong College when the building and land were purchased by the college following Hudleston's death in 1909, and soon grew in reputation, acquiring its first boat in 1911. The Laboratory also operated a public aquarium and once housed the coble in which Grace Darling and her father rescued passengers from the SS Forfarshire in 1838.

In 1967 responsibility for the Laboratory was transferred to Newcastle University. At one point the entrance was a long beam that had to be walked across.

== Present Day ==
As a research facility the Laboratory is normally closed to the public, but holds open days during the summer months and as part of other events such as Cullercoats Harbour Day and Heritage Open Days.

A Marine Science distance learning course, Delve Deeper, run by the University includes a field course component based at the laboratory.

== Research Vessels of the Dove Marine Laboratory ==
- The Evadne: 1911 –
- Pandalus: 1950s
- The Alexander Meek: 1950s – 1973
- RV Bernicia: 1973 – 2011
- RV The Princess Royal: 2011 – present
