= Lord Henry Percy (disambiguation) =

Lord Henry Percy properly refers only to:

- Lord Henry Percy (1817–1877), younger son of the 5th Duke of Northumberland and an English recipient of the Victoria Cross

It may also, erroneously, refer to:

- Sir Henry Percy ("Hotspur") (1364–1403), eldest son of the 1st Earl of Northumberland

Or to any of the following Earls and Dukes of Northumberland, known as "Lord Percy" or "Earl Percy" before succeeding to their peerages:

- Henry Percy, 3rd Earl of Northumberland (1421–1461), son of the 2nd Earl of Northumberland
- Henry Percy, 4th Earl of Northumberland (1449–1489), son of the 3rd Earl of Northumberland
- Henry Algernon Percy, 5th Earl of Northumberland (1478–1527), son of the 4th Earl of Northumberland
- Henry Percy, 6th Earl of Northumberland (1502–1537), son of the 5th Earl of Northumberland
- Henry Percy, 8th Earl of Northumberland (1532–1585), son of the 7th Earl of Northumberland
- Henry Percy, 9th Earl of Northumberland (1564–1632), son of the 8th Earl of Northumberland
- Henry Percy, 7th Duke of Northumberland (1846–1918), son of the 6th Duke of Northumberland
- Henry Percy, 9th Duke of Northumberland (1912–1940), son of the 8th Duke of Northumberland
- Henry Percy, 11th Duke of Northumberland (1953–1995), son of the 10th Duke of Northumberland
