= Blackpool by-election =

Blackpool by-election may refer to several by-elections in the town of Blackpool, Lancashire, England:

- 1886 Blackpool by-election, following the elevation to the peerage of Frederick Stanley
- 1900 Blackpool by-election, following the elevation to the peerage of Matthew Ridley
- 1962 Blackpool North by-election, following the elevation to the peerage of Toby Low
- 2024 Blackpool South by-election, following the resignation of Scott Benton
