= Worsley-Taylor baronets =

Title in the Baronetage of the United Kingdom

The Worsley-Taylor Baronetcy, of Moreton Hall in the Parish of Whalley the County Palatine of Lancaster, was a title in the Baronetage of the United Kingdom. It was created on 19 February 1917 for Henry Worsley-Taylor, Conservative Member of Parliament for Blackpool between 1900 and 1906. The title became extinct on the death of the fourth Baronet in 1958.

== Worsley-Taylor baronets, of Moreton Hall (1917) ==
- Sir Henry Wilson Worsley-Taylor, 1st Baronet (1847–1924)
- Sir James Worsley-Taylor, 2nd Baronet (1872–1933)
- Sir John Godfrey Worsley-Taylor, 3rd Baronet (1915–1952)
- Sir Francis Edward Worsley-Taylor, 4th Baronet (1874–1958)

Coat of arms of Worsley-Taylor of Moreton Hall
Crest In front of a tilting spear fessewise proper a wolf’s head erased Or, gorged with a wreath of oak Vert. Escutcheon Azure, a chevron flory-counterflory between two falcons close, belled and jessed in chief, and a wolf’s head erased in base Or. Motto With thy might
