= Olivia Bennet, Countess of Tankerville =

English peeress

The Right Honourable The Countess of Tankerville

Personal details
- Born: 18 July 1830
- Died: 15 February 1922 (aged 91) Tunbridge Wells, Kent, England
- Spouse: Charles Bennet, 6th Earl of Tankerville (m. 1850)
- Children: 5, including George Montagu Bennet, 7th Earl of Tankerville
- Parents: George Montagu, 6th Duke of Manchester (father); Millicent Sparrow (mother)
- Relatives: William Montagu, 7th Duke of Manchester (brother); Lord Robert Montagu (brother)

Olivia Susan Bennet, Countess of Tankerville (18 July 1830 – 15 February 1922), formerly Lady Olivia Montagu, was the wife of Charles Bennet, 6th Earl of Tankerville.

== Biography ==
Olivia was the eldest daughter of George Montagu, 6th Duke of Manchester, and his first wife, the former Millicent Sparrow.

She married the earl on 29 January 1850 at Kimbolton Castle, Huntingdonshire. They had five children:

- Charles Bennett, Lord Ossulston (1850-1879), who died in India, of cholera, aged 28, unmarried
- George Montagu Bennet, 7th Earl of Tankerville (30 March 1852 – 9 July 1931) he married Leonora van Marter and had children.
- Hon. Frederick Augustus (1853-1891), who died unmarried.
- Lady Corisande Olivia (1855-1941), who died unmarried.
- Lady Ida Louise (1857-1887), who married John Ramsay, 13th Earl of Dalhousie, and had children.

Their oldest son, Lord Ossulston, purchased a commission in the Coldstream Guards in 1870, later transferring to the Rifle Brigade as a lieutenant in 1873. Following his death, the second son, George, became heir to the earldom.

Her only published work was a pamphlet, A Bright Spot In Outcast London. It was published in 1884, and was reprinted by Nabu Press in 2011.

The countess died at Greystokes, Tunbridge Wells, Kent, aged 91.
