= Lord William Percy =

English noble and soldier

Lord William Percy CBE DSO
- Born: Hon. William Richard Percy; 17 May 1882; Mayfair, London
- Died: 8 February 1963 (aged 80); Horstead, Norfolk
- Education: University of Oxford
- Father: Henry, Duke of Northumberland
- Relatives: Henry, Earl Percy (brother); Alan, Duke of Northumberland (brother); Eustace Percy, Lord Percy of Newcastle (brother); George Campbell (grandfather)
- Military career
- Rank: Colonel
- Unit: Grenadier Guards
- Wars: World War I

Colonel Lord William Richard Percy CBE DSO (17 May 1882 – 8 February 1963) was a British military officer, barrister, and aristocrat from the Percy family who served in the Grenadier Guards during the First World War. He was also an ornithologist who was an authority on the bittern.

== Biography ==
Lord William was born at 25 Grosvenor Square, the fourth son of Henry Percy, 7th Duke of Northumberland and Lady Edith Campbell, daughter of George Campbell, 8th Duke of Argyll. After his eldest brother, Henry, Earl Percy, died in 1909 of pneumonia, his brother Alan became heir to the dukedom. His youngest brother was Eustace Percy, 1st Baron Percy of Newcastle.

Percy attended the University of Oxford where he was a member of the Bullingdon Club. In 1906, he was called to the Bar by the Inner Temple but left the law over his "disgust" with a judge's handling of a murder case.

In 1915, he was severely wounded while serving with the Grenadier Guards at the Battle of Neuve Chapelle. He served as deputy advocate general and assistant adjutant general to the Egyptian Expeditionary Force under Field Marshal Edmund Allenby, 1st Viscount Allenby.

Lord Percy was mentioned in dispatches and appointed Commander of the Royal Order of George I, King of Greece.

== Travel and ornithology ==
Lord Percy was a lifelong traveler who made many expeditions to Africa, the Middle East, to the Americas, and to Siberia. He wrote a few articles in scientific journals and published a short book on Norfolk waterfowl, Three Studies in Bird Character: Bitterns, Herons and Water Rails, published in 1951. He also contributed essays to David Armitage Bannerman's Birds of the British Isles. One of these was an account of Steller's eider duck, "the most fascinating of all ducks in the Old World or the New", based upon observations made during an expedition to North East Siberia which he had undertaken to find another duck, the spectacled eider, which at the time was mistakenly believed to be extinct.

== Religion ==
Lord William was raised in the Catholic Apostolic Church, which was co-founded by his great-grandfather Henry Drummond, whose daughter married 6th Duke of Northumberland. His world outlook was heavily influenced by this religious tradition, which "looked for an imminent Second Advent and which stressed the transitory nature of this world."

Despite Lord William's intelligence and passion, he did not fulfill his potential in any area. In its obituary, The Times connected the two:

He had an intense interest in a wide diversity of subjects-everything was grist to his penetrating, analytical mind. His devotion to the principles in which he believed was unswerving and complete. He loved talk, and in conversation he was a formidable debater. With such gifts as his he might have achieved much in almost any field he chose. That he did not make his mark in any career was certainly not due to a failure in personality, or to any lack of determination, courage, or ability. It seems likely that his complete lack of worldly ambition stemmed rather from theological principles and from the influence exercised upon him in his youth by the tenets of the Catholic Apostolic Church of which his parents were adherents.

— The Times,

== Personal life ==
Lord William married Mary Swinton, daughter of Captain George Swinton of Kimmerghame House. They had two sons.

He died at his home, Horstead House in Norfolk, in 1963. His widow died in 1984.
