= National Union of Conservative and Constitutional Associations =

The National Union of Conservative and Constitutional Associations (NUCCA) was an organization set up by Benjamin Disraeli. It is considered to be a precursor to the modern Conservative Party Conference. Unless otherwise stated, details of chairmen and Presidents of the NUCCA are taken from British Historical Facts 1830-1900 by Chris Cook and Brendan Keith or from British Political Facts 1900-1994 by David Butler and Gareth Butler, as appropriate.

== Presidents of National Union of Conservative and Constitutional Associations ==
- 1868: The Earl of Dartmouth (also served in 1884)
- 1869: The Lord Skelmersdale (also served in 1891 when he had been created the Earl of Lathom)
- 1870 - 1871: The Earl of Feversham
- 1872: The Duke of Abercorn
- 1873: The Lord Wharncliffe
- 1874: The Lord Hampton
- 1875: The Lord Colchester
- 1876: The Marquess of Abergavenny
- 1877: The Lord Winmarleigh
- 1878: The Earl Cadogan
- 1879: The Earl Manvers
- 1880: The Marquess of Hertford
- 1881: The Marquess of Salisbury
- 1882: The Duke of Northumberland
- 1883: The Duke of Beaufort
- 1884: The Earl of Dartmouth (also served in 1868)
- 1885: The Duke of Norfolk
- 1886: The Baron Tredegar
- 1887: The Earl of Londesborough
- 1888: The Earl of Jersey
- 1889: The Earl of Dartmouth
- 1890: The Duke of Portland
- 1891: The Earl of Lathom (had also served in 1869 when he was known as the Lord Skelmersdale)
- 1892: The Lord Windsor (also served as chairman in 1900 and as president in 1908, when he was known as the Earl of Plymouth)
- 1893: The Earl of Scarbrough
- 1894: The Earl of Dunraven
- 1895: The Marquess of Londonderry
- 1896: The Duke of Norfolk (also served in 1904)
- 1897: The Earl of Derby (also served in 1903)
- 1898: The Earl Cadogan
- 1899: The Duke of Beaufort
- 1900: The Marquess of Zetland
- 1901: The Lord Llangattock
- 1902: The Earl of Dartmouth
- 1903: The Earl of Derby (had also served in 1897)
- 1904: The Duke of Norfolk (had also served in 1896)
- 1905: The Lord Montagu
- 1906 - 1907: The Duke of Northumberland
- 1908: The Earl of Plymouth (had also served as president in 1892 and as chairman in 1900, when he was known as the Lord Windsor)
- 1909: The Earl Cawdor
- 1910: The Earl of Derby
- 1911: The Duke of Portland

== Chairmen of National Union of Conservative and Constitutional Associations ==
- 1867: John Eldon Gorst MP
- 1868: Viscount Holmesdale MP (later became Earl Amherst)
- 1869 - 1874: Henry Cecil Raikes MP
- 1875: Viscount Mahon MP (later became Earl Stanhope)
- 1876 -1878: Lord Claud Hamilton MP
- 1879 - 1883: Earl Percy MP
- 1884: Lord Randolph Churchill MP and Sir Michael Hicks Beach MP
- 1885: Lord Claud Hamilton MP
- 1886 - 1888: Ellis Ashmead-Bartlett MP
- 1889: Sir Albert Kaye Rollit MP
- 1890: Frederick Dixon-Hartland MP
- 1891: Henry Byron Reed MP
- 1892: Charles Beilby Stuart-Wortley MP
- 1893: Sir Henry Stafford Northcote MP (later became the Lord Northcote)
- 1894: James Rankin MP
- 1895: Sir Charles Edward Howard Vincent MP
- 1896: Marquess of Granby (also served in 1907 when he had become Duke of Rutland)
- 1897: Arthur Hugh Smith-Barry MP (later became the Lord Barrymore)
- 1898: Sir John Benjamin Stone MP
- 1899: Gerald Walter Erskine Loder MP
- 1900: The Lord Windsor (later became Earl of Plymouth)
- 1901: Sir Alfred Hickman MP
- 1902: Sir Charles Daniel Cave
- 1903: Francis William Lowe MP
- 1904: Henry Ferryman Bowles MP
- 1905: Sir Walter Richard Plummer MP
- 1906: Henry Imbert-Terry
- 1907: The Duke of Rutland (had also served in 1896 when he was known as Marquess of Granby)
- 1908: Sir Robert Hodge
- 1909: Sir Thomas Wrightson
- 1910: Henry Chaplin MP (later became Viscount Chaplin)
- 1911: The Lord Kenyon
