= Victor Stanley (Royal Navy officer) =

Royal Navy Admiral (1867-1934)

Admiral The Honourable Sir Victor Stanley KCB MVO
- Born: 17 January 1867
- Died: 9 June 1934 (aged 67)
- Military career
- Allegiance: United Kingdom
- Branch: Royal Navy
- Rank: Admiral
- Commands: HMS Essex; Royal Naval College, Dartmouth; HMS Erin; Reserve Fleet
- Conflicts: World War I
- Awards: Knight Commander of the Order of the Bath; Commander of the Royal Victorian Order

Admiral Sir Victor Albert Stanley KCB MVO (17 January 1867 – 9 June 1934) was a senior Royal Navy officer who commanded the Reserve Fleet.

== Naval career ==
Born the son of the Frederick Stanley, 16th Earl of Derby, giving him the honorific "The Honourable", Stanley entered the navy in 1880, was appointed a Lieutenant in 1889, promoted to Commander in January 1901, and Captain 1905. He became naval attaché to Russia in 1905, commanding officer of the cruiser HMS Essex in 1909 and Captain of the Royal Naval College, Dartmouth in 1912. He served in World War I as commanding officer of the battleship HMS Erin from 1914 to 1917. He became naval attaché in the British delegation to Washington D. C. in 1918, Second-in-Command of the 1st Battle Squadron in 1919 and Vice Admiral Commanding the Reserve Fleet in 1924. He was promoted to full admiral on 2 March 1926, before retiring the same year.

He stood unsuccessfully for the Conservative Party in Blackpool in the 1923 General Election.

General Election 1923: Blackpool
Party	Candidate	Votes	%	±%
Liberal	Hugh Mowbray Meyler	22,264	53.7	+3.9
Unionist	Hon. Victor Albert Stanley	19,192	46.3	−3.9
Majority		3,072	7.4	7.8
Turnout			84.8	+6.5
Liberal gain from Unionist		Swing	+3.9	

== Family ==
He married in 1896 Canadian Annie Bickerton Pooley, daughter of the Hon. C. E. Pooley, K.C., of British Columbia.

Military offices
Preceded by Sir William Goodenough	Commander-in-Chief, Reserve Fleet; 1924–1926	Succeeded by Sir Rudolph Bentinck
