= Addison Cresswell (politician) =

British politician (1788–1879)

Member of Parliament for North Northumberland
- In office 12 July 1841 – 13 August 1847 Serving with Lord Ossulston
- Preceded by: Viscount Howick; Lord Ossulston
- Succeeded by: Lord Ossulston; Sir George Grey

Personal details
- Born: 1 October 1788
- Died: 5 May 1879 (aged 90)
- Party: Conservative

Addison John Baker Cresswell (1 October 1788 – 5 May 1879) was a British Conservative politician.

Cresswell was elected Conservative Member of Parliament for North Northumberland at the 1841 general election but was unseated at the next election in 1847. He was the elder brother of lawyer Sir Cresswell Cresswell.

Parliament of the United Kingdom
Preceded by Viscount Howick; Lord Ossulston	Member of Parliament for North Northumberland; 1841–1847; With: Lord Ossulston	Succeeded by Lord Ossulston; Sir George Grey
