= 1874 North Northumberland by-election =

UK Parliamentary by-election

The 1874 North Northumberland by-election was fought on 17 March 1874. The by-election was fought due to the incumbent Conservative MP, Earl Percy, becoming Treasurer of the Household. It was retained by the incumbent.
