= Matthew White Ridley, 1st Viscount Ridley =

British politician (1842–1904)

The Right Honourable The Viscount Ridley PC DL
- Ridley, c. 1893-1903

Home Secretary
- In office 29 June 1895 – 12 November 1900
- Monarch: Victoria
- Prime Minister: The Marquess of Salisbury
- Preceded by: H. H. Asquith
- Succeeded by: Charles Ritchie

Member of the House of Lords
- Lord Temporal
- In office 17 December 1900 – 28 November 1904
- Preceded by: Peerage created
- Succeeded by: The 2nd Viscount Ridley

Personal details
- Born: Matthew White Ridley; 25 July 1842 London, England
- Died: 28 November 1904 (aged 62) Blagdon Hall, Northumberland
- Party: Conservative
- Spouse(s): Hon. Mary Georgiana Marjoribanks (1850–1899)
- Children: 5, including Matthew and Jasper
- Parent(s): Sir Matthew White Ridley, 4th Baronet; Hon. Cecilia Anne Parke
- Education: Balliol College, Oxford

Matthew White Ridley, 1st Viscount Ridley (25 July 1842 – 28 November 1904), known as Sir Matthew White Ridley, 5th Baronet, from 1877 to 1900, was a British Conservative statesman. He notably served as Home Secretary from 1895 to 1900.

== Background and education ==
Ridley was born in London, the eldest son of Sir Matthew White Ridley, 4th Baronet, and his wife the Hon. Cecilia Anne, daughter of James Parke, 1st Baron Wensleydale, and his wife Cecilia Arabella Frances Barlow. He was educated at Harrow and Balliol College, Oxford. After graduating with a Bachelor of Arts in 1865, he was a Fellow of All Souls for nine years.

== Political career ==
In 1868, he was elected Conservative Member of Parliament for Northumberland North, and held this seat until the 1885 general election, when he was defeated in his attempt to stand for the new seat of Hexham. At the 1886 general election he contested Newcastle-upon-Tyne, again unsuccessfully, but returned to Parliament in an 1886 by-election at Blackpool. Having been Under-Secretary of State for the Home Department for two years in Disraeli's administration, Sir Matthew Ridley (as he became when he succeeded his father as fifth baronet in 1877) was Financial Secretary to the Treasury in Lord Salisbury's interim government of 1885 to 1886. In 1895, after the fall of Lord Rosebery's ministry, and having already failed in April of that year to be elected Speaker of the House of Commons, Ridley became Home Secretary, and held this post until his retirement in 1900. He was that same year created Viscount Ridley and Baron Wensleydale, of Blagdon and Blyth in the County of Northumberland.

Ridley received the honorary degree of LL.D. from the Royal University of Ireland in april 1900, when he was in Dublin during the visit of Queen Victoria to Ireland that year.

== Family ==
Lord Ridley married Mary Georgiana Marjoribanks (1850 – 14 March 1909), daughter of the 1st Baron Tweedmouth and his wife, Isabella Weir-Hogg, on 10 December 1873. They were parents to five children:

- Matthew White Ridley, 2nd Viscount Ridley (6 December 1874 – 14 February 1916)
- Cecilia Marjorie Ridley (1879 – 16 August 1896)
- Hon. Stella Ridley (18 December 1884 – 8 June 1973), married Rupert Gwynne
- Hon. Sir Jasper Nicholas Ridley (6 January 1887 – 1 October 1951), married Countess Nathalie Louise von Benckendorff. He was a Knight Commander of the Royal Victorian Order.
- Hon. Grace Ridley (16 February 1889 – 22 September 1959), married the 3rd Earl of Selborne.

Lord Ridley died aged 62 at his Blagdon Hall home in Northumberland, and was buried there.

Parliament of the United Kingdom
Preceded by Sir Matthew White Ridley, Bt; Lord Henry Percy	Member of Parliament for North Northumberland; 1868–1885; With: Earl Percy	Constituency abolished
Preceded by Hon. Frederick Stanley	Member of Parliament for Blackpool; 1886–1900	Succeeded by Henry Worsley-Taylor
Political offices
Preceded by Sir Henry Selwin-Ibbetson, Bt	Under-Secretary of State for the Home Department; 1878–1880	Succeeded by Arthur Peel
Preceded by Sir Henry Holland, Bt	Financial Secretary to the Treasury; 1885–1886	Succeeded by William Jackson
Preceded by H. H. Asquith	Home Secretary; 1895–1900	Succeeded by Charles Ritchie
Peerage of the United Kingdom
New creation	Viscount Ridley; 1900–1904; Member of the House of Lords (1900–1904)	Succeeded by Matthew White Ridley
Baronetage of Great Britain
Preceded by Matthew White Ridley	Baronet of Blagdon; 1877–1904	Succeeded by Matthew White Ridley
Business positions
Preceded by Sir Joseph Pease, Bt	Chairman of the North Eastern Railway; 1902–1904	Succeeded by Sir Edward Grey, Bt
