= Albert Lindsay Parkinson =

British politician (1870-1936)

Sir Albert Lindsay Parkinson
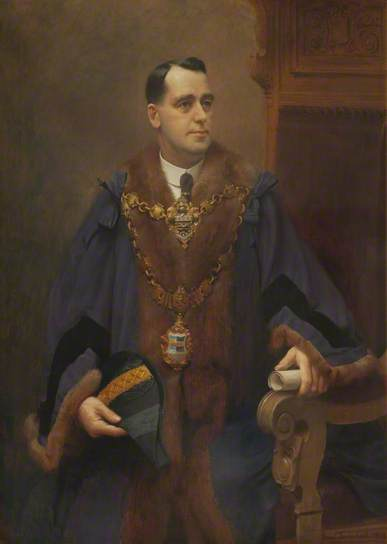
- Sir Lindsay Parkinson by Ernest Townsend, 1918

Member of Parliament for Blackpool
- In office 1918–1922
- Preceded by: Wilfrid Ashley
- Succeeded by: Leonard Molloy

Personal details
- Born: 24 February 1870 Lytham, Lancashire, England
- Died: 3 February 1936 (aged 65) Marton, Lancashire, England
- Party: Conservative
- Spouse: Margaret Singleton
- Children: 3
- Parents: Jacob Parkinson (father); Mary Ann Hall (mother)

Sir Albert Lindsay Parkinson (24 February 1870 – 3 February 1936), often known as Lindsay Parkinson, was a British businessman and Conservative Party politician. He was the Member of Parliament (MP) for Blackpool in Lancashire from 1918 until 1922.

== Biography ==
Parkinson was born in Lytham to Jacob Parkinson, a joiner. The family moved to Blackpool in 1873. He left school at fourteen to join his father's business, Jacob Parkinson & Co., which later expanded into the building trade. On the death of Jacob in 1902, the business became a limited company, with Lindsay Parkinson as managing director.

Parkinson served on Blackpool Town Council from 1905 to 1919, and was elected three times as Mayor of Blackpool, serving from 1916 to 1919.

At the 1918 election, he was selected as the Coalition Conservative candidate for the seat of Blackpool. He did not contest the seat in 1922, when it was held for the Conservatives by Leonard Molloy.

Parkinson was appointed Knight Bachelor in the 1922 King's Birthday Honours. He was knighted by King George V at Buckingham Palace on 8 July 1922.

On being knighted, Parkinson changed the name of his company to Sir Lindsay Parkinson & Co. Ltd. On 13 July 1937, it was incorporated as a public company, technically known as Sir Lindsay Parkinson Holdings Limited.

Parkinson remained involved in politics, serving as chairman of the Blackpool Conservative and Unionist Association in 1924. He received the Freedom of the Borough of Blackpool in 1926.

A keen sportsman, Parkinson gave the cricket ground at Stanley Park to Blackpool Cricket Club. He arranged his own cricket eleven, which played two first-class matches, one in 1933 against the touring West Indians, and one in 1935 against Leicestershire, both at Stanley Park.

Parkinson died on 3 February 1936, aged 65, at his home, Royal Bank, Preston Old Road, Marton, where he had lived for many years, and was buried in Marton Cemetery.

Parliament of the United Kingdom
Preceded by Wilfrid Ashley	Member of Parliament for Blackpool; 1918 – 1922	Succeeded by Leonard Molloy
