= Sir Lindsay Parkinson & Company =

UK civil engineering company

Sir Lindsay Parkinson & Company Ltd
- Company type: Public company
- Industry: Civil engineering
- Founded: 13 July 1937
- Founder: Albert Lindsay Parkinson
- Defunct: 4 September 1974
- Fate: Bought by Fairclough
- Successor: Leonard Fairclough & Son (AMEC)
- Headquarters: Lindsay House, 88 Upper Richmond Road, Putney, SW15
- Area served: UK, Australia, Egypt, Cyprus, Portugal
- Services: Road construction
- Subsidiaries: Wentworth Estate

Sir Lindsay Parkinson & Company Ltd, commonly known as Sir Lindsay Parkinson & Co. Ltd or Lindsay Parkinson, was a civil engineering company in the UK. It was responsible for the construction of a significant part of the UK motorway network, including elements of the M4 and the M6. It was acquired by Leonard Fairclough & Son in 1974.

== History ==
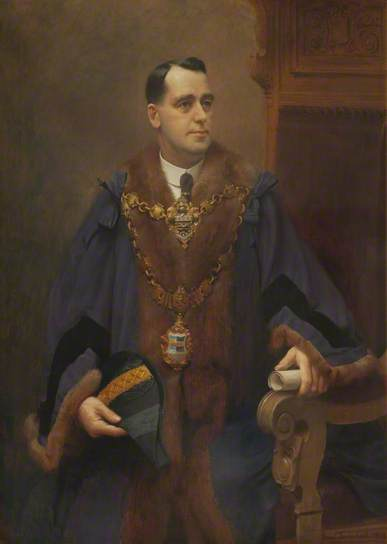
A. Lindsay Parkinson by Ernest Townsend, 1918

The original name of the firm, registered about 1877, was Jacob Parkinson and Company, and Jacob operated a joiner's shop in Blackpool. His four sons worked in the business, one of whom was the eponymous Lindsay Parkinson. Joinery developed into general building work and in the early 1900s Parkinson's contracts included the Talbot Hotel and the Alhambra Theatre in Blackpool. A contract to work on the Theatre Royal in Newcastle upon Tyne led to the opening of an office in that city; a number of theatres were built in other towns in the north and the midlands. By the time of World War I, the company had a London office.

The war expanded the range of contracts to include aerodromes and railway sidings. When peace came, the firm became involved in large-scale housing schemes (including the Parkinson-Kahn reinforced concrete house) and a wider range of civil engineering work – including new trunk roads. Lindsay Parkinson was knighted for public services and the company took on his new name.

=== Public company ===
On 13 July 1937, the assets were transferred to a newly-formed company, Sir Lindsay Parkinson Holdings Limited.

The company was initially based at the now demolished Lindsay House, 171, Shaftesbury Avenue, London and then relocated to new offices at 6, Lambeth Road, St. George's Circus in 1955.

During the Second World War the company was one of the contractors engaged in building the Mulberry harbour units.

On 20 December 1943, the Chairman of the company, Lieutenant Colonel George Westhead Parkinson MC, was killed, after his car hit a lorry at Bedfont on the Great South-West Road. He was aged 69. The managing director since 1937, Albert Edward Parkinson, became chairman.

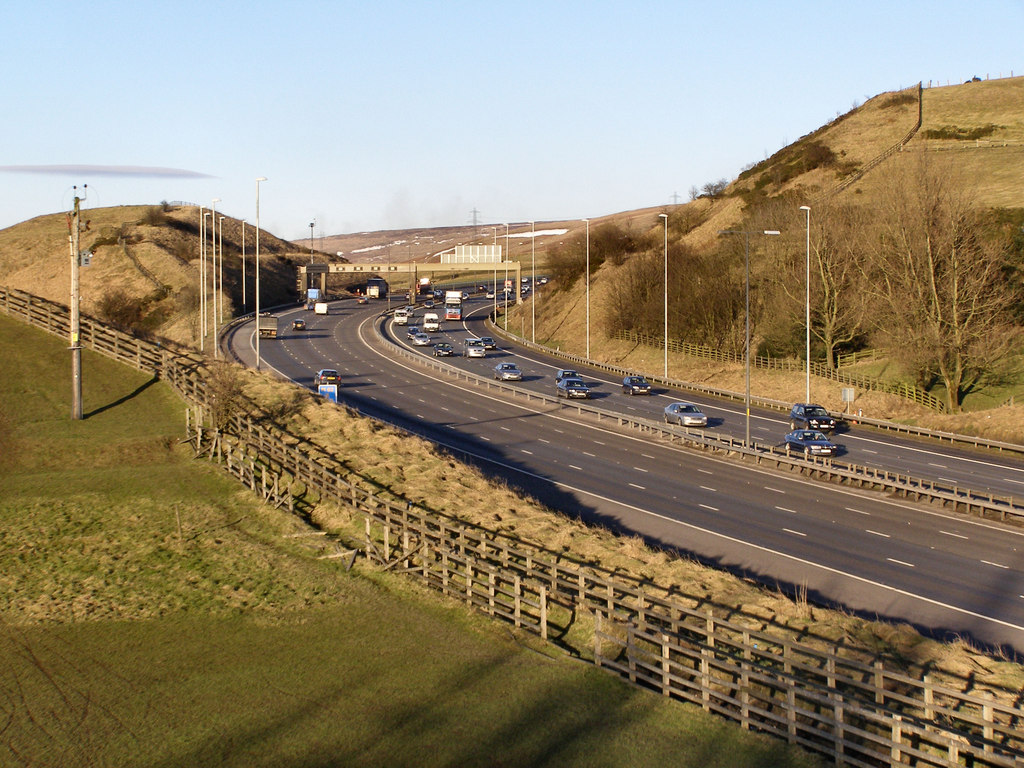
M62 looking east towards the Rakewood Viaduct

=== Takeover ===
In August 1974 it was taken over by Leonard Fairclough & Son, based at Sandiway House in Northwich.

== Major projects ==
=== Structures ===
- No.3 Fish Dock, Grimsby
- Basildon Hospital, completed in 1973

=== Roads ===
- M6 Lancaster bypass, completed in 1960
- M6 junctions 8 (Bescot) to 10 (Darlaston), completed in 1971
- M62, A56 to A672 (Windy Hill), completed in 1971
- Ellesmere Port motorway M53, completed in 1972
- M4 Crick to Newport (23 to 24), completed in 1966
- M1 (Northern Ireland) junctions 8 to 9, completed in 1965
- M1 (Northern Ireland) junctions 10 to 12, completed in 1968

=== Reservoirs ===
- Llys-y-Fran Dam, completed in 1972
