= Sir George Grey, 2nd Baronet =

British Whig politician (1799–1882)

The Right Honourable Sir George Grey Bt PC
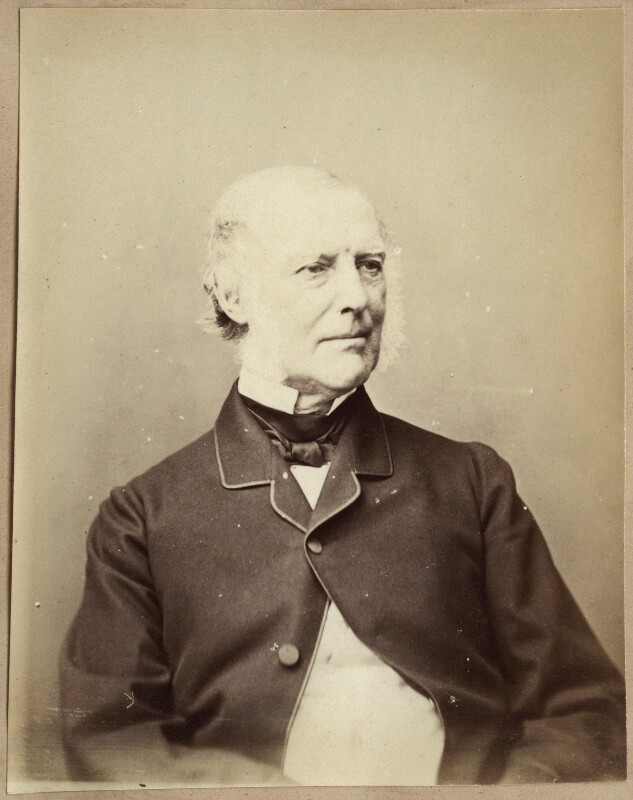
- Grey in the 1860s

Home Secretary
- In office 25 July 1861 – 28 June 1866
- Prime Minister: The Viscount Palmerston; The Earl Russell
- Preceded by: Sir George Cornewall Lewis, Bt
- Succeeded by: Spencer Horatio Walpole
- In office 8 February 1855 – 26 February 1858
- Prime Minister: The Viscount Palmerston
- Preceded by: The Viscount Palmerston
- Succeeded by: Spencer Horatio Walpole
- In office 8 July 1846 – 23 February 1852
- Prime Minister: Lord John Russell
- Preceded by: Sir James Graham, Bt
- Succeeded by: Spencer Horatio Walpole

Chancellor of the Duchy of Lancaster
- In office 22 June 1859 – 25 July 1861
- Prime Minister: The Viscount Palmerston
- Preceded by: The Duke of Montrose
- Succeeded by: Edward Cardwell
- In office 23 June 1841 – 30 August 1841
- Prime Minister: The Viscount Melbourne
- Preceded by: The Earl of Clarendon
- Succeeded by: Lord Granville Somerset

Personal details
- Born: 11 May 1799 Gibraltar
- Died: 9 September 1882 (aged 83)
- Party: Whig; Liberal
- Spouse: Anna Sophia Ryder
- Relatives: House of Grey
- Education: Oriel College, Oxford

Sir George Grey, 2nd Baronet, PC (11 May 1799 – 9 September 1882) was a British Whig politician and a scion of the noble House of Grey. He held office under four Prime Ministers, Lord Melbourne, Lord John Russell, Lord Aberdeen, and Lord Palmerston, notably serving three times as Home Secretary for a collective 13 years.

== Background and education ==
Grey was the eldest son of Sir George Grey, 1st Baronet, who was himself the third son of Charles Grey, 1st Earl Grey, and younger brother of Prime Minister Charles Grey, 2nd Earl Grey. His mother was Mary Whitbread, daughter of Samuel Whitbread, an English brewer and Member of Parliament. He was born at Gibraltar, where is father was engaged as part of his naval command.

Grey was educated privately and at Oriel College, Oxford. Originally intending to become a priest, he instead chose law as his profession, and was called to the bar in 1826. He began a successful legal practice before entering politics.

== Political career, 1832–1853 ==
Grey was elected to parliament as a Whig for Devonport in 1832, and quickly made his mark in the House of Commons. He did not hold office in the Whig administration of his uncle Lord Grey, but when Lord Melbourne became prime minister in 1834, he was appointed Under-Secretary of State for War and the Colonies. The government fell in December of that year, but returned to power in May 1835, when Grey resumed the post of Under-Secretary of State for War and the Colonies (succeeding William Ewart Gladstone). He retained this office until 1839, when he was made Judge Advocate General. The same year Grey was also admitted to the Privy Council. He was then briefly Chancellor of the Duchy of Lancaster in 1841, with a seat in the cabinet for the first time until the Whigs were defeated in the general election that year.

The Whigs returned to power in July 1846 under Lord John Russell, who appointed Grey Home Secretary, the first of his three spells in this position. Grey, "himself a zealous advocate of hydropathy", immediately introduced a bill which became known as the Public Baths and Washhouses Act 1846 (9 & 10 Vict. c. 74). This allowed local authorities in England and Wales to provide baths and washhouses, as well as swimming pools (the latter initially open-air only), and charge them to the rates. This was followed by further statutes which became known collectively as "The Baths and Wash-houses Acts 1846 to 1896". This was an important milestone in the improvement of sanitary conditions and public health, recognised as such by Agnes Campbell in her 1918 report to the Carnegie UK Trust, which also included information about all the baths and washhouses then open, and the text of each of the acts.

Grey decided to leave his seat at Devonport, partly owing to the baths scandal, returning instead for his native Northumberland North in an 1847 by-election, from the family seat at Fallodon, which he had recently inherited from his uncle, Henry Grey.

The new baronet sat throughout the parliament in active support of Lord John Russell, until the collapse of the ministry after the scandal of the Durham Letter, and controversial Ecclesiastical Titles bull. Traditional Whigs were Protestant, among them Grey, but the liberality of authorising a catholic hierarchy changed the nature of party politics. Grey's first tenure at the Home Office notably saw him deal with relief efforts to the victims of the Great Famine of Ireland and trying to subdue the Irish rebellion of 1848. The latter year also saw the peak of the Chartist movement, which staged a massive rally in London in April. In 1847, Grey had left his old constituency in Devonport. He remained Home Secretary until the 1852 general election, when, despite enjoying widespread popularity, he lost his seat.

== Political career, 1853–1874 ==
Grey remained out of parliament until January 1853, when he was returned for Morpeth. He at first refused to join the coalition government of Lord Aberdeen, but in June 1854 he accepted the post of Colonial Secretary. The coalition fell in February 1855, and the Whigs returned to office under Lord Palmerston. Grey was appointed to his old office of Home Secretary, which he retained until the government resigned in February 1858. The Conservative administration under the Earl of Derby which took office only lasted until June the following year, when Palmerston again became prime minister. Grey was now appointed Chancellor of the Duchy of Lancaster, but in 1861 he became Home Secretary for the third time. The government fell in 1866, and Grey was not to hold office again. Before the 1874 general election, he was overlooked as the Liberal candidate for Morpeth in favour of miners' leader Thomas Burt. This marked the end of Grey's public life and he spent the remainder of his life in retirement at his Fallodon estate in Northumberland. In 1873 Grey took his grandson, Edward on a tour of Scotland. The train they were travelling in pulled in at the tiny village halt of Kingussie in the Highlands, where they were met on the platform by none other than William Gladstone.

== Family ==
Grey married Anna Sophia Ryder, eldest daughter of Henry Ryder, Bishop of Lichfield, a son of the Earl of Harrowby. They had one son, George Henry Grey (1835–1874). As his only son had predeceased him, he was succeeded in the baronetcy by his grandson, Edward, who also became a prominent Liberal politician, serving as Foreign Secretary from 1905 to 1916, when he was raised to the peerage as Viscount Grey of Fallodon.

George Grey was an affectionate family man, a good sense of humour and quickness of mind. He was widely welcomed by a wide variety of friends. A devoted grandfather of seven, he often accompanied out riding, even until eighty years old. Ever an enthusiastic sportsman he encouraged his family to play tennis. He was a keen reader of the classics, with a great knowledge of Latin, Greek, and Hebrew; Shakespeare's plays, Walter Scott's poetry were part of their education. To the end he was conscientious of his children's welfare. He died with them around him, aged eighty-three. His only son and heir was George Henry Grey. His eldest grandson Edward inherited the estate at Fallodon.

== Arms ==
Coat of arms of Sir George Grey, 2nd Baronet
| Crest A scaling ladder in bend sinister Or hooked and pointed Sable. Escutcheon Gules a lion rampant within a bordure engrailed Argent a mullet for difference. Motto De Bon Vouloir Servir Le Roy (To Serve The King With Good Will) |

== See also ==
- Earl Grey
- House of Grey
- Edward Grey, 1st Viscount Grey of Fallodon

== Notes ==
a.' Online searches for reference to the relevant acts have so far yielded listings from the London Gazette. See also the Parliamentary Archives website.

Parliament of the United Kingdom
| New constituency | Member of Parliament for Devonport; 1832 – 1847; With: Edward Codrington to 1839; Henry Tufnell from 1839 | Succeeded by John Romilly; Henry Tufnell |
| Preceded by Addison Cresswell; Lord Ossulston | Member of Parliament for North Northumberland; 1847 – 1852; With: Lord Ossulston | Succeeded by Lord Lovaine; Lord Ossulston |
| Preceded by Edward Howard | Member of Parliament for Morpeth; 1853–1874 | Succeeded by Thomas Burt |
Political offices
| Preceded by John Shaw-Lefevre | Under-Secretary of State for War and the Colonies; 1834 | Succeeded by John Stuart-Wortley |
| Preceded by William Ewart Gladstone | Under-Secretary of State for War and the Colonies; 1835–1839 | Succeeded by Henry Labouchere |
| Preceded by The Earl of Clarendon | Chancellor of the Duchy of Lancaster; 1841 | Succeeded by Lord Granville Somerset |
| Preceded by Sir James Graham, Bt | Home Secretary; 1846–1852 | Succeeded by Spencer Horatio Walpole |
| Vacant Title last held by Welbore Ellis | Secretary of State for the Colonies; 1854–1855 | Succeeded by Sidney Herbert |
| Preceded by The Viscount Palmerston | Home Secretary; 1855–1858 | Succeeded by Spencer Horatio Walpole |
| Preceded by The Duke of Montrose | Chancellor of the Duchy of Lancaster; 1859–1861 | Succeeded by Edward Cardwell |
| Preceded by Sir George Lewis, Bt | Home Secretary; 1861–1866 | Succeeded by Spencer Horatio Walpole |
Legal offices
| Preceded by William St Julien Arabin | Judge Advocate General; 1839–1841 | Succeeded by Richard Lalor Shiel |
Baronetage of the United Kingdom
| Preceded by George Grey | Baronet (of Fallodon); 1828–1882 | Succeeded by Edward Grey |
