= Wilfred Hudleston Hudleston =

English geologist, ornithologist and paleontologist

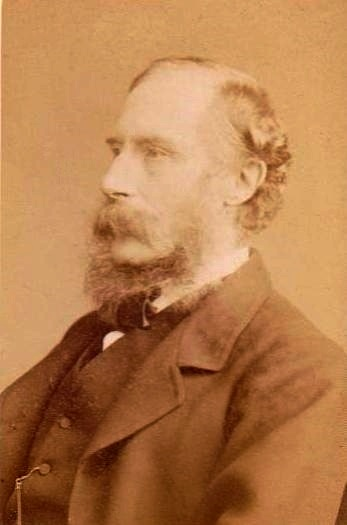
- Photograph in profile of WH HUdleston
- Born: 2 June 1828; York, England
- Died: 29 January 1909 (aged 80); West Holme, near Wareham, Dorset, England
- Education: University of Edinburgh; Royal College of Chemistry
- Scientific career
- Fields: Natural Sciences, Geology, Mineralogy
- Institutions: Geologists' Association; Yorkshire Museum

Wilfred Hudleston Hudleston FRS (né Simpson) (2 June 1828 – 29 January 1909) was an English geologist, ornithologist and paleontologist.

== Life ==
Hudleston was born at York on 2 June 1828. He was the eldest son of John Simpson of Knaresborough (the third in succession to practise medicine) and Elizabeth, daughter of Thomas Ward of Dore House, near Handsworth. His mother was an heiress through her mother, Eleanor Hudleston (died 1856), of the family of Hudleston of Hutton John, Cumberland. Wilfred, who with the rest of his family assumed the surname of Hudleston by royal licence in 1867, was educated first at St Peter's School, York, and afterwards at Uppingham, proceeding to St John's College, Cambridge, where he graduated B.A. in 1850 and M.A. in 1853.

At Cambridge, he was interested chiefly in ornithology, which he had begun to study at school. In 1855 he spent a summer in Lapland, collecting with Alfred Newton and John Woolley. After visiting Algeria and the eastern Atlas with Henry Baker Tristram and Osbert Salvin, he spent more than a year in Greece and Turkey adding to his collections. From 1862 to 1867, he systematically studied natural history and chemistry, attending courses of lectures at the University of Edinburgh, and afterwards at the Royal College of Chemistry in London. Undecided at first whether to make chemistry or geology his chief subject, he was drawn to the latter by the influence of John Morris.

Settling in London, although he lived part of the year on property at West Holme, Dorset, and at Knaresborough, he began his career as a geologist. Engaging actively in the work of the Geologists' Association, he served as secretary from 1874 to 1877, and supplied many reports of their excursions. He was president of the association (1881–83). He became a fellow of the Geological Society of London in 1867, was secretary (1886–90), and president from 1892 to 1894. He contributed to the society's Journal, among others, a paper (with the Rev. J. F. Blake) on the Corallian rocks of England. Other papers on the Jurassic system appeared in the Geological Magazine, and in 1887 he began to publish in the Palæontographical Society's volumes a monograph on the inferior oolite gastropods, which, when completed in 1896, comprised 514 pages of letterpress and 44 plates in 9 parts. It was largely founded on his own collection of these fossils, which he bequeathed to the Sedgwick Museum, Cambridge. Hudleston was honorary curator of mineralogy for the Yorkshire Museum from 1877 until 1907 and served as a council member of the Yorkshire Philosophical Society during this period.

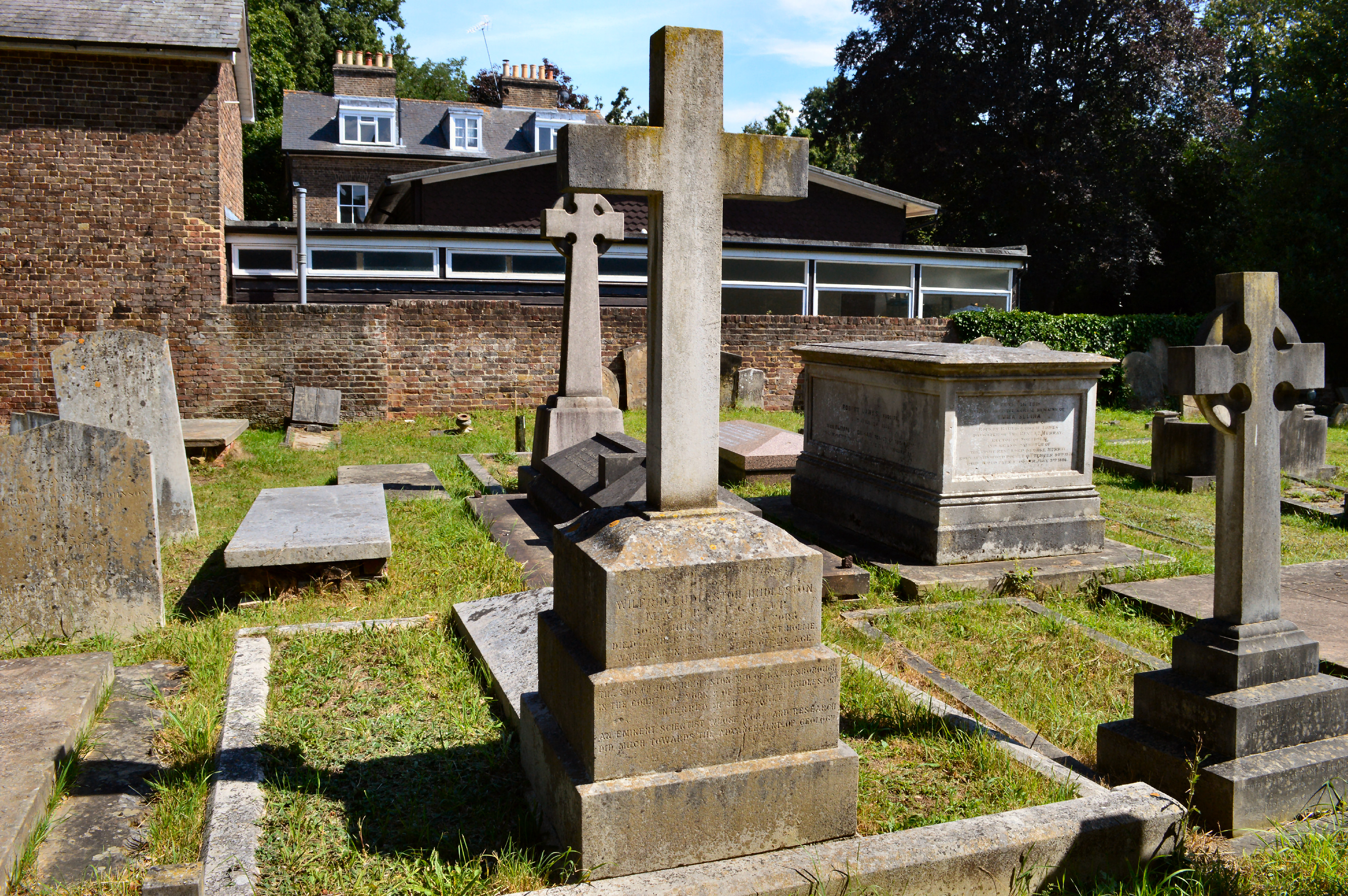
Tomb in St Andrew's Church, Ham

In 1884, Hudleston was elected Fellow of the Royal Society. In 1886 and the following year he undertook some dredging in the English Channel for mollusca, and aided the foundation of a marine laboratory at Cullercoats, Northumberland. Early in 1895 he made a journey in India, travelling from Bombay as far as Srinagar. Hudleston, who received the Geological Society's Wollaston Medal in 1897, presided over the geological section of the British Association in 1898. He received, with the other three original members, a gold medal at the Fiftieth Anniversary 'Jubilee Meeting of the British Ornithologists' Union' in December 1908. He was also a president of the Devonshire Association and other local societies.

In 1906 he funded the construction of what became the Dove Marine Laboratory, now part of the University of Newcastle, after the original site had been destroyed by fire. In 1910 he posthumously co-authored a book entitled "A history of the Dove family : and their descendants in connection with Cullercoats, Northumberland".

Hudleston died on 29 January 1909, aged 80, at his country house at West Holme, near Wareham, Dorset. He is buried at St Andrew's Church on Ham Common; his headstone records that he was "An eminent scientist whose work and research did much towards the advancement of geology".

== Works ==
- HUDLESTON, W. H. 1877. Notes on the Chemical Composition of some of the Rocks of the Lizard District. Quarterly Journal of the Geological Society of London 33, pp. 924 – 928.
- HUDLESTON, W. H. 1882. Silurian Fossils in the North-West Highlands. Nature 25, 582 – 583. https://doi.org/10.1038/025582c0
- HUDLESTON, W. H. 1885. The geology of Palestine. Printed London : E. Stanford.
- HUDLESTON, W. H. (1887–1896). A monograph of the inferior Oolite Gasteropoda. Palaeontographical Society Monographs. 514 pp., pls. 1 - 44.
- HUDLESTON, W. H. & WILSON, E. 1892. A catalogue of British Jurassic Gasteropoda comprising the genera and species hitherto described, with references to their geological distribution and to the localities in which they have been found. Published by the authors and Dulau and Co., London.
- HUDLESTON, W. H. 1900. The war in South Africa, 1899-1900. Printed London : Harrison.
- HUDLESTON, W. H. 1907. Artesian Wells in Dorset and elsewhere ... From "Proceedings" Dorset Natural History and Antiquarian Field Club, etc. Publisher: "Dorset County Chronicle" Printing Works: Dorchester.
- HUDLESTON, W. H., LISH, J. J. & MEEK, A. 1910. A history of the Dove family : and their descendants in connection with Cullercoats, Northumberland. Printed by Andrew Reid & Co., Newcastle upon Tyne (for Armstrong College).
- HUDLESTON, W. H. The Growth of Germany: a study of the causes which have led to the consolidation of the German Empire under the leadership of Prussia. With two illustrations. Publisher: Richard Jackson, Leeds (1913).

== Fossil eponyms ==
- Pectinatites (arkellites) hudlestoni Cope, 1967. [Order: Ammonitida]. Kimmeridge Clay Formation (Kimmeridgian), Hudlestoni Zone, Rope Lake Head, Kimmeridge, Dorset, England.
- Myophorella hudlestoni (Lycett, 1877). [Class: Bivalvia, Order Trigoniida]. Elsworth Rock Formation, (Oxfordian), Elsworth, Cambridgeshire, England.
- Hudlestonia Buckman, 1889. [Order: Ammonitida - Family: Hildoceratidae].
- Hudlestonella Cossmann, 1909 [Class: Gastropoda - Family: Pseudomelaniidae]. From the Cretaceous of the Russian Federation.
