= Charles Bennet, 6th Earl of Tankerville =

British peer and Conservative politician

The Right Honourable The Earl of Tankerville PC
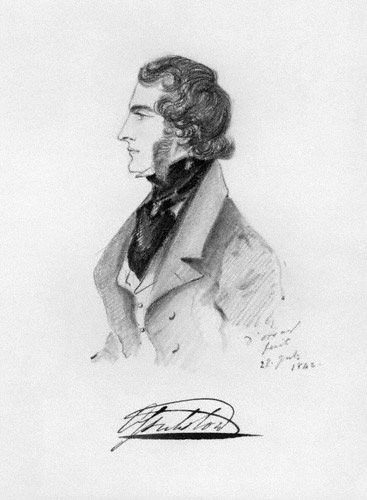
- A portrait of Bennet by Alfred d'Orsay.

Captain of the Gentlemen-at-Arms
- In office 10 July 1866 – 19 March 1867
- Monarch: Victoria
- Prime Minister: The Earl of Derby
- Preceded by: The Lord Foley
- Succeeded by: The Marquess of Exeter

Lord Steward of the Household
- In office 19 March 1867 – 1 December 1868
- Monarch: Victoria
- Prime Minister: The Earl of Derby; Benjamin Disraeli
- Preceded by: The Duke of Marlborough
- Succeeded by: The Earl of Bessborough

Personal details
- Born: 10 January 1810 Charles Street, Berkeley Square, London
- Died: 18 December 1899 (aged 89) Chillingham Castle, Northumberland
- Party: Conservative
- Spouse: Lady Olivia Montagu (1830-1922)
- Education: Christ Church, Oxford

Charles Augustus Bennet, 6th Earl of Tankerville PC (10 January 1810 – 18 December 1899), styled Lord Ossulston between 1822 and 1859, was an English peer and Conservative politician. He served as Captain of the Honourable Corps of Gentlemen-at-Arms between 1866 and 1867 and as Lord Steward of the Household between 1867 and 1868.

== Background and education ==
Bennet was born at Charles Street, Berkeley Square, London, the eldest son of Charles Bennet, 5th Earl of Tankerville and Armandine Corisande de Gramont, daughter of the 8th Duke of Gramont. He was educated at Harrow and Christ Church, Oxford. He became known by the courtesy title Lord Ossulston on the death of his grandfather in 1822.

== Political career ==
Lord Ossulston entered Parliament as Member of Parliament for North Northumberland in 1832. He held this seat until 1859, when he was summoned to the House of Lords through a writ of acceleration in his father's barony of Ossulston. He succeeded his father in the earldom only a month later. On 8 March 1833, he was appointed a deputy lieutenant of Northumberland. He served under the Earl of Derby as Captain of the Honourable Corps of Gentlemen-at-Arms from 1866 to 1867 and under Derby and then Benjamin Disraeli as Lord Steward of the Household from 1867 to 1868. In 1866 he was sworn of the Privy Council.

== Sporting interests ==
Lord Ossulton was a frequent visitor to Glen Feshie and Ardverikie in Badenoch for shooting and stalking. He was a friend of the artist Sir Edwin Landseer.

== Family ==
Lord Tankerville married Lady Olivia Montagu (18 July 1830 – 15 February 1922), eldest daughter of George Montagu, 6th Duke of Manchester, at Kimbolton Castle, Huntingdonshire, on 29 January 1850. They had five children:

- Charles Bennett, Lord Ossulston (31 December 1850, d. 29 June 1879); he died of cholera in India at the age of twenty-eight. He entered the Coldstream Guards as an ensign and lieutenant by purchase in 1870, and exchanged to the Rifle Brigade as a lieutenant in 1873.
- George Montagu Bennet, 7th Earl of Tankerville (30 March 1852 – 9 July 1931); he married Leonora van Marter on 23 October 1895. They had four children, four grandchildren and seven great-grandchildren.
- Hon. Frederick Augustus (30 May 1853 – 5 September 1891), died unmarried.
- Lady Corisande Olivia (1855-11 January 1941), died unmarried.
- Lady Ida Louise (22 June 1857 – 24 November 1887); she married John Ramsay, 13th Earl of Dalhousie on 6 December 1877. They had five sons.

Lord Tankerville died at the family seat of Chillingham Castle, Northumberland, in December 1899, aged 89, and was succeeded by his second but only surviving son, George. The Countess of Tankerville died at Greystones, Tunbridge Wells, Kent, on 15 February 1922, aged 91, and was interred at Chillingham on 20 February 1922.

Parliament of the United Kingdom
New constituency	Member of Parliament for North Northumberland; 1832 – 1859; With: Viscount Howick 1832–1841; Addison Cresswell 1841–1847; Sir George Grey, Bt 1847–1852; Lord Lovaine 1852–1865	Succeeded by Lord Lovaine; Sir Matthew Ridley, Bt
Political offices
Preceded by The Lord Foley	Captain of the Gentlemen-at-Arms; 1866 – 1867	Succeeded by The Marquess of Exeter
Preceded by The Duke of Marlborough	Lord Steward of the Household; 1867 – 1868	Succeeded by The Earl of Bessborough
Peerage of Great Britain
Preceded by Charles Bennet	Earl of Tankerville; June 1859 – 1899	Succeeded by George Bennet
Preceded by Charles Bennet	Baron Ossulston (writ of acceleration); May 1859 – 1899	Succeeded by George Bennet
