= Leonard Molloy =

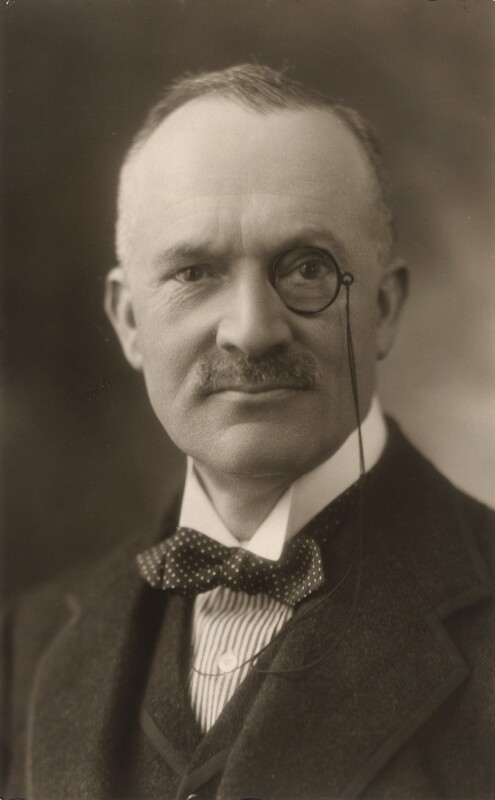
Molloy in 1923

Major Leonard Greenham Star Molloy DSO (1861–1937) was an Irish medical doctor and politician.

Molloy was born in Naas, County Kildare, Ireland, the son of Richard Molloy of Rathgar, Dublin. He was educated at Trinity College Dublin where he obtained his M.A., M.D. and D.Ph. He was commissioned surgeon lieutenant in the Duke of Lancaster's Own Yeomanry in 1901, and was appointed a lieutenant when he resigned his commission as a surgeon in July 1902. During World War I he served in France and Headquarters (dispatches twice) and was 2nd in command of the 23rd Division. Major Molloy was awarded the Distinguished Service Order (DSO) in 1917. He retired from the Army in 1921. He was an honorary Life Member of the St. John Ambulance Association and in 1921 was made a Knight of Grace of the Order of St. John of Jerusalem.

The Times (London) in its obituary said of him "... for a generation [he was] one of the best known doctors in the north of England". He later practised in Harley Street and Monte Carlo. Although he was about 60 at the time, he was elected to Parliament for Blackpool in 1922 as a Conservative which was also the same year that he married Ethel Mary Willan, daughter of James Wetherell Willan a Manchester solicitor.

In Who's Who he described his interests as "hunting, shooting and salmon-fishing".

Parliament of the United Kingdom
Preceded by Sir Albert Lindsay Parkinson	Member of Parliament for Blackpool; 1922–1923	Succeeded by Hugh Mowbray Meyler
