= North Northumberland =

UK Parliament constituency (1832–1885, 2024 onwards)

Coordinates: 55.51°N 1.91°W

- County constituency for the House of Commons
- Interactive map of boundaries since 2024
- Location within North East England
- County: Northumberland
- Electorate: 72,541 (March 2020)
- Major settlements: Berwick-upon-Tweed, Morpeth, Alnwick

Current constituency
- Created: 2024
- Member of Parliament: David Smith (Labour)
- Seats: One
- Created from: Berwick-upon-Tweed; Hexham (minor part)

1832–1885
- Seats: Two
- Type of constituency: County constituency
- Created from: Northumberland
- Replaced by: Berwick-upon-Tweed; Hexham; Wansbeck

North Northumberland is a county constituency of the House of Commons of the Parliament of the United Kingdom. Since 2024 it has been represented by David Smith of the Labour Party.

Between 1832 and 1885 (then formally the Northern Division of Northumberland), it was represented by two Members of Parliament, elected by the bloc vote system.

Following the 2023 review of Westminster constituencies, it was re-established as a single-member seat for the 2024 general election.

== Constituency profile ==
North Northumberland is a constituency in Northumberland in North East England. Its largest town is Morpeth, which has a population of around 15,000. Other settlements include the towns of Berwick-upon-Tweed, Alnwick, Amble, Rothbury and Wooler and the village of Pegswood.

This is a large, rural, sparsely-populated constituency which includes the Cheviot Hills area of the Northumberland National Park and the Northumberland Coast National Landscape. The area is popular with tourists; it contains coastal holiday parks at Beadnell and Seahouses and is known for its castles, particularly at Bamburgh, Warkworth, Alnwick and Lindisfarne. Mortpeth and Berwick-upon-Tweed are historic market towns. Berwick is notable for being England's northernmost town and having changed hands between England and Scotland numerous times throughout history; many residents today identify as being Scottish. The constituency has overall average levels of wealth; there is some deprivation in Berwick and in the former coal mining villages of Ellington and Lynemouth, whilst Morpeth and Alnwick are more affluent. House prices are generally higher than the rest of North East England but lower than the UK average.

North Northumberland has a low proportion of young adults and a high retired population; 31% of residents are over the age of 65. In general, residents have average levels of education, homeownership and income, and the child poverty rate is in line with the rest of the country. A high proportion of residents work in the agriculture, tourism and retail sectors, and the percentage claiming unemployment benefits is low. White people made up 98% of the population at the 2021 census.

Most of the constituency is represented by Conservatives at the local county council, although there were some Reform UK councillors elected around Berwick and Amble and Labour Party councillors elected in the former coal mining areas east of Morpeth. An estimated 53% of voters in North Northumberland supported leaving the European Union in the 2016 referendum, similar to the UK-wide figure of 52%.

== Boundaries ==
North Northumberland constituency as it was 1832 to 1885. The constituency is the striped area with a longer coastline to the north.

=== 1832–1885 ===
- The Wards of Bamborough, Coquetdale, Glendale and Morpeth, and the Berwick Bounds.

The seat was created by the Great Reform Act 1832 by the splitting of Northumberland constituency into Northern and Southern divisions. It was abolished by the Redistribution of Seats Act 1885, when Northumberland was divided into four single member divisions: Berwick-upon-Tweed, Hexham, Tyneside and Wansbeck.

=== Current ===
Further to the 2023 boundary review, the constituency was defined as composing the following electoral divisions of the County of Northumberland from the 2024 general election (as they existed on 1 December 2020):

- Alnwick, Amble, Amble West with Warkworth, Bamburgh, Berwick East, Berwick North, Berwick West with Ord, Druridge Bay, Longhoughton, Lynemouth, Morpeth Kirkhill, Morpeth North, Morpeth Stobhill, Norham and Islandshires, Pegswood, Rothbury, Shilbottle, and Wooler.

It comprises the former constituency of Berwick-upon-Tweed, together with the town of Morpeth, transferred from the former Wansbeck seat.

Further to a local government boundary review which came into effect in May 2025, the constituency now comprises the following electoral divisions of Northumberland:

- Alnwick Castle, Alnwick Hotspur, Amble, Amble West with Warkworth, Bamburgh, Berwick East, Berwick North, Berwick West with Ord, Druridge Bay, Longhirst, Longhorsley (part), Longhoughton, Lynemouth, Morpeth Kirkhill, Morpeth North, Morpeth Stobhill, Norham and Islandshires, Pegswood, Rothbury, Shilbottle, and Wooler.

== Members of Parliament ==
=== MPs 1832–1885 ===
Constituency created (1832)

Election	1st Member	1st Party	2nd Member	2nd Party
1832	Viscount Howick	Whig	Lord Ossulston	Conservative
1841	Addison Cresswell	Conservative	Lord Ossulston	Conservative
1847	Sir George Grey, Bt	Whig	Lord Ossulston	Conservative
1852	Lord Lovaine	Conservative	Lord Ossulston	Conservative
1859	Lord Lovaine	Conservative	Sir Matthew White Ridley, Bt	Conservative
1865	Lord Henry Percy	Conservative	Sir Matthew White Ridley, Bt	Conservative
1868	Earl Percy	Conservative	Matthew White Ridley	Conservative
1885	Redistribution of Seats Act: constituency abolished			

=== MPs since 2024 ===
Berwick-upon-Tweed prior to 2024

Election	Member	Party
2024	David Smith	Labour

== Elections ==
=== Elections in the 2020s ===
General election 2024: North Northumberland
Party	Candidate	Votes	%	±%
Labour	David Smith	17,855	36.6	+13.5
Conservative	Anne-Marie Trevelyan	12,788	26.2	−29.7
Reform	Katherine Hales	7,688	15.7	+14.2
Liberal Democrats	Natalie Younes	5,169	10.6	−5.5
Independent	Georgina Hill	3,220	6.6	N/A
Green	Jan Rosen	1,743	3.6	+0.2
Independent	Michael Joyce	288	0.6	N/A
SDP	Andrew Martin	92	0.2	N/A
Majority		5,067	10.4	N/A
Turnout		48,843	65.9	−6.8
Labour gain from Conservative		Swing	+21.6	

=== Elections in the 2010s ===
2019 notional result
Party	Vote	%
Conservative	29,497	55.9
Labour	12,191	23.1
Liberal Democrats	8,484	16.1
Green	1,793	3.4
Brexit	775	1.5
Turnout	52,740	72.7
Electorate	72,541	

== Election results 1832–1885 ==
=== Elections in the 1830s ===
General election 1832: North Northumberland
Party	Candidate	Votes	%
Tory	Charles Bennet	Unopposed	
Whig	Henry Grey	Unopposed	
Registered electors		2,322	
Tory win (new seat)			
Whig win (new seat)			

General election 1835: North Northumberland
Party	Candidate	Votes	%
Conservative	Charles Bennet	Unopposed	
Whig	Henry Grey	Unopposed	
Registered electors		2,367	
Conservative hold			
Whig hold			

Grey was appointed as Secretary at War, requiring a by-election.

By-election, 1 May 1835: North Northumberland
Party	Candidate	Votes	%
Whig	Henry Grey	Unopposed	
Whig hold			

General election 1837: North Northumberland
Party	Candidate	Votes	%
Conservative	Charles Bennet	Unopposed	
Whig	Henry Grey	Unopposed	
Registered electors		2,786	
Conservative hold			
Whig hold			

=== Elections in the 1840s ===
General election 1841: North Northumberland
Party	Candidate	Votes	%	±%
Conservative	Charles Bennet	1,216	34.9	N/A
Conservative	Addison Cresswell	1,163	33.4	N/A
Whig	Henry Grey	1,101	31.6	N/A
Majority		62	1.8	N/A
Turnout		2,188	79.4	N/A
Registered electors		2,756		
Conservative hold		Swing	N/A	
Conservative gain from Whig		Swing	N/A	

General election 1847: North Northumberland
Party	Candidate	Votes	%	±%
Whig	George Grey	1,366	35.5	+3.9
Conservative	Charles Bennet	1,247	32.4	−2.5
Conservative	Algernon Percy	1,237	32.1	−1.3
Majority		119	3.1	N/A
Turnout		2,608 (est)	86.1 (est)	+6.7
Registered electors		3,030		
Whig gain from Conservative		Swing	+3.9	
Conservative hold		Swing	−2.2	

=== Elections in the 1850s ===
General election 1852: North Northumberland
Party	Candidate	Votes	%	±%
Conservative	Algernon Percy	1,414	34.9	+2.8
Conservative	Charles Bennet	1,335	33.0	+0.6
Whig	George Grey	1,300	32.1	−3.4
Majority		35	0.9	N/A
Turnout		2,675 (est)	86.0 (est)	−0.1
Registered electors		3,111		
Conservative hold		Swing	+2.3	
Conservative gain from Whig		Swing	+1.2	

General election 1857: North Northumberland
Party	Candidate	Votes	%	±%
Conservative	Algernon Percy	Unopposed		
Conservative	Charles Bennet	Unopposed		
Registered electors		3,296		
Conservative hold				
Conservative hold				

Percy was appointed a Civil Lord of the Admiralty, requiring a by-election.

By-election, 11 March 1858: North Northumberland
Party	Candidate	Votes	%	±%
Conservative	Algernon Percy	Unopposed		
Conservative hold				

Percy was appointed Vice-President of the Board of Trade, requiring a by-election.

By-election, 10 March 1859: North Northumberland
Party	Candidate	Votes	%	±%
Conservative	Algernon Percy	Unopposed		
Conservative hold				

General election 1859: North Northumberland
Party	Candidate	Votes	%	±%
Conservative	Algernon Percy	Unopposed		
Conservative	Matthew White Ridley	Unopposed		
Registered electors		3,280		
Conservative hold				
Conservative hold				

=== Elections in the 1860s ===
General election 1865: North Northumberland
Party	Candidate	Votes	%	±%
Conservative	Henry Percy	Unopposed		
Conservative	Matthew White Ridley	Unopposed		
Registered electors		3,109		
Conservative hold				
Conservative hold				

General election 1868: North Northumberland
Party	Candidate	Votes	%	±%
Conservative	Henry Percy	Unopposed		
Conservative	Matthew White Ridley	Unopposed		
Registered electors		3,612		
Conservative hold				
Conservative hold				

=== Elections in the 1870s ===
General election 1874: North Northumberland
Party	Candidate	Votes	%	±%
Conservative	Henry Percy	Unopposed		
Conservative	Matthew White Ridley	Unopposed		
Registered electors		3,480		
Conservative hold				
Conservative hold				

Percy was appointed Treasurer of the Household, causing a by-election.

By-election, 17 Mar 1874: North Northumberland
Party	Candidate	Votes	%	±%
Conservative	Henry Percy	Unopposed		
Conservative hold				

=== Elections in the 1880s ===
General election 1880: North Northumberland
Party	Candidate	Votes	%	±%
Conservative	Henry Percy	2,163	38.1	N/A
Conservative	Matthew White Ridley	2,001	35.3	N/A
Liberal	John Clay	1,509	26.6	New
Majority		492	8.7	N/A
Turnout		3,591 (est)	82.1 (est)	N/A
Registered electors		4,376		
Conservative hold		Swing	N/A	
Conservative hold		Swing	N/A	

== See also ==
- List of parliamentary constituencies in Northumberland
- History of parliamentary constituencies and boundaries in Northumberland
- List of parliamentary constituencies in North East England (region)

== Sources ==
- Leigh Rayment's Historical List of MPs – Constituencies beginning with "N" (part 3)
