= Henry Percy, 7th Duke of Northumberland =

British Conservative politician

His Grace The Duke of Northumberland KG PC FRS
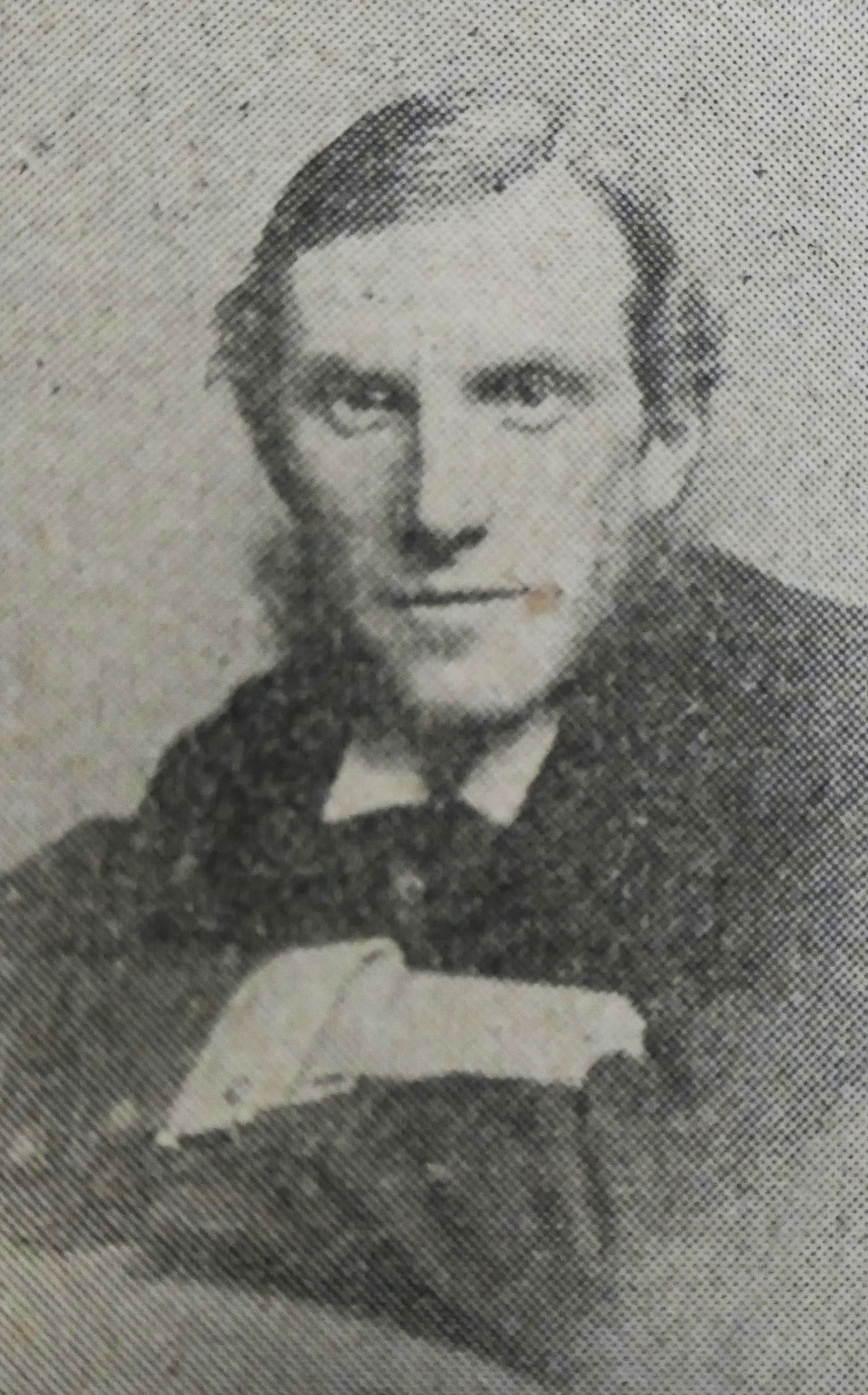
- The Duke of Northumberland, then Earl Percy, in 1895.

Lord High Steward 1911 Coronation of King George V
- In office 9 August 1902 – 9 August 1902
- Monarch: George V
- Prime Minister: H. H. Asquith
- Preceded by: The Duke of Marlborough
- Succeeded by: The Marquess of Salisbury

Treasurer of the Household
- In office 2 March 1874 – 14 December 1875
- Monarch: Queen Victoria
- Prime Minister: Benjamin Disraeli
- Preceded by: The Lord Monson
- Succeeded by: Lord Henry Thynne

Personal details
- Born: 29 May 1846
- Died: 14 May 1918 (aged 71)
- Party: Conservative
- Spouse(s): Lady Edith Campbell (1849–1913)
- Children: 13, including Henry, Alan, William, and Eustace
- Parent(s): Algernon Percy, 6th Duke of Northumberland; Louisa Drummond

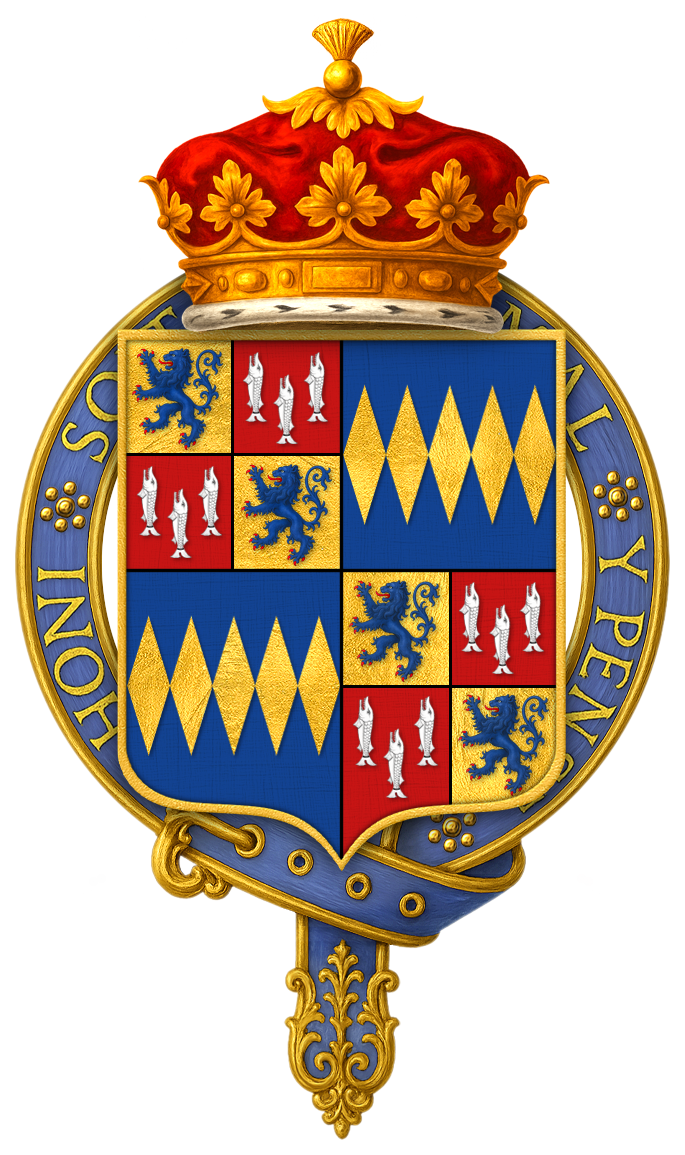
Quartered arms of Henry Percy, 7th Duke of Northumberland, KG, PC, FRS

Henry George Percy, 7th Duke of Northumberland, KG PC FRS (29 May 1846 – 14 May 1918), styled Lord Warkworth between 1865 and 1867 and Earl Percy between 1867 and 1899, was a British Conservative politician. He served as Treasurer of the Household under Benjamin Disraeli between 1874 and 1875 and was Chairman of the National Union of Conservative and Constitutional Associations from 1879 to 1883.

== Background ==
Percy was the eldest son of Algernon Percy, 6th Duke of Northumberland, by his wife Louisa, daughter of Henry Drummond. Lord Algernon Percy was his younger brother. He became known by the courtesy title Lord Warkworth when his grandfather succeeded in the dukedom of Northumberland in 1865 and as Earl Percy when his father succeeded in the dukedom in 1867.

== Political career ==
Percy was returned to parliament for Northumberland North in 1868. In 1874 he was sworn of the Privy Council and appointed Treasurer of the Household under Benjamin Disraeli, a post he held until 1875. From 1879 to 1883 he was Chairman of the National Union of Conservative and Constitutional Associations. The Northumberland North seat was abolished in 1885 and Percy was not elected for another constituency. Two years later he was summoned to the House of Lords through a writ of acceleration in his father's barony of Lovaine.

From 1909 he was made an alderman on Middlesex County Council.

== Civic and military appointments ==
Percy succeeded in the dukedom in 1899 upon his father's death and was made a Knight of the Garter the same year. He later served as Lord Lieutenant of Northumberland from 1904 until his death in 1918 and was Lord High Steward at King George V's coronation in 1911, where he bore St Edward's Crown. He was President of the Board of Governors of Durham University College of Science (in Newcastle) in 1902, and from 1913 he also served as the second Chancellor of the University of Durham.

He was president of the Guildford Agricultural Association from 1902.

He was honorary colonel of the 2nd Northumberland (Percy) Artillery Volunteers until it was disbanded in October 1902.

== Family ==
Northumberland married Lady Edith Campbell, daughter of George Campbell, 8th Duke of Argyll, on 23 December 1868. They had 13 children:

- Lady Louisa Elizabeth Percy (7 November 1869 – 29 November 1893), unmarried.
- Lady Edith Eleanor Percy (7 November 1869 – 2 April 1937), unmarried.
- Henry Algernon George Percy, Earl Percy (21 January 1871 – 30 December 1909), unmarried.
- Lady Margaret Percy (30 August 1873 – 29 January 1934), unmarried.
- Lady Victoria Alexandrina Percy (12 February 1875 – 18 January 1958), unmarried.
- Hon. Josceline Percy (26 January 1876 – 31 January 1898), unmarried.
- Hon. Ralph William Percy (9 March 1877 – 28 March 1889), died in childhood.
- Lady Mary Percy (30 August 1878 – 18 March 1965). Married Aymer Edward Maxwell (son and heir of Sir Herbert Maxwell, 7th Baronet) and was the mother of author and naturalist Gavin Maxwell.
- Alan Ian Percy, 8th Duke of Northumberland (17 April 1880 – 23 August 1930).
- Lord William Richard Percy CBE DSO (17 May 1882 – 8 February 1963), married Mary Swinton, daughter of Captain George Sitwell Campbell Swinton.
- Lord James Percy (6 January 1885 – 20 May 1903), died unmarried.
- Eustace Sutherland Campbell Percy, 1st Baron Percy of Newcastle (21 March 1887 – 3 April 1958).
- Lady Muriel Evelyn Nora Percy (14 July 1890 – 23 November 1956), unmarried.

The Duchess of Northumberland died in July 1913, aged 63. Northumberland survived her by five years and died in May 1918, aged 71.

Parliament of the United Kingdom
Preceded by Sir Matthew Ridley, Bt; Lord Henry Percy	Member of Parliament for North Northumberland; 1868 – 1885; With: Sir Matthew Ridley, Bt	Constituency abolished
Political offices
Preceded by The Lord Monson	Treasurer of the Household; 1874–1875	Succeeded by Lord Henry Thynne
Party political offices
Preceded by Lord Claud Hamilton	Chairman of the National Union of Conservative and Constitutional Associations; 1879–1883	Succeeded by Lord Randolph Churchill; Sir Michael Hicks-Beach, Bt
Honorary titles
Preceded by The Earl Grey	Lord Lieutenant of Northumberland; 1904–1918	Succeeded by The Duke of Northumberland
Court offices
Vacant Title last held by The Duke of Marlborough	Lord High Steward; 1911	Vacant Title next held by The Earl of Durham
Academic offices
Preceded by George William Kitchin	Chancellor of the University of Durham; 1913–1918	Succeeded by The Earl of Durham
Peerage of Great Britain
Preceded by Algernon Percy	Duke of Northumberland; 1899–1918	Succeeded by Alan Percy
Preceded by Algernon Percy	Baron Lovaine (writ in acceleration); 1887–1918	Succeeded by Alan Percy
Professional and academic associations
Preceded by William Stubbs	President of the Surtees Society; 1901–18	Succeeded by William Brown
