= Henry Worsley-Taylor =

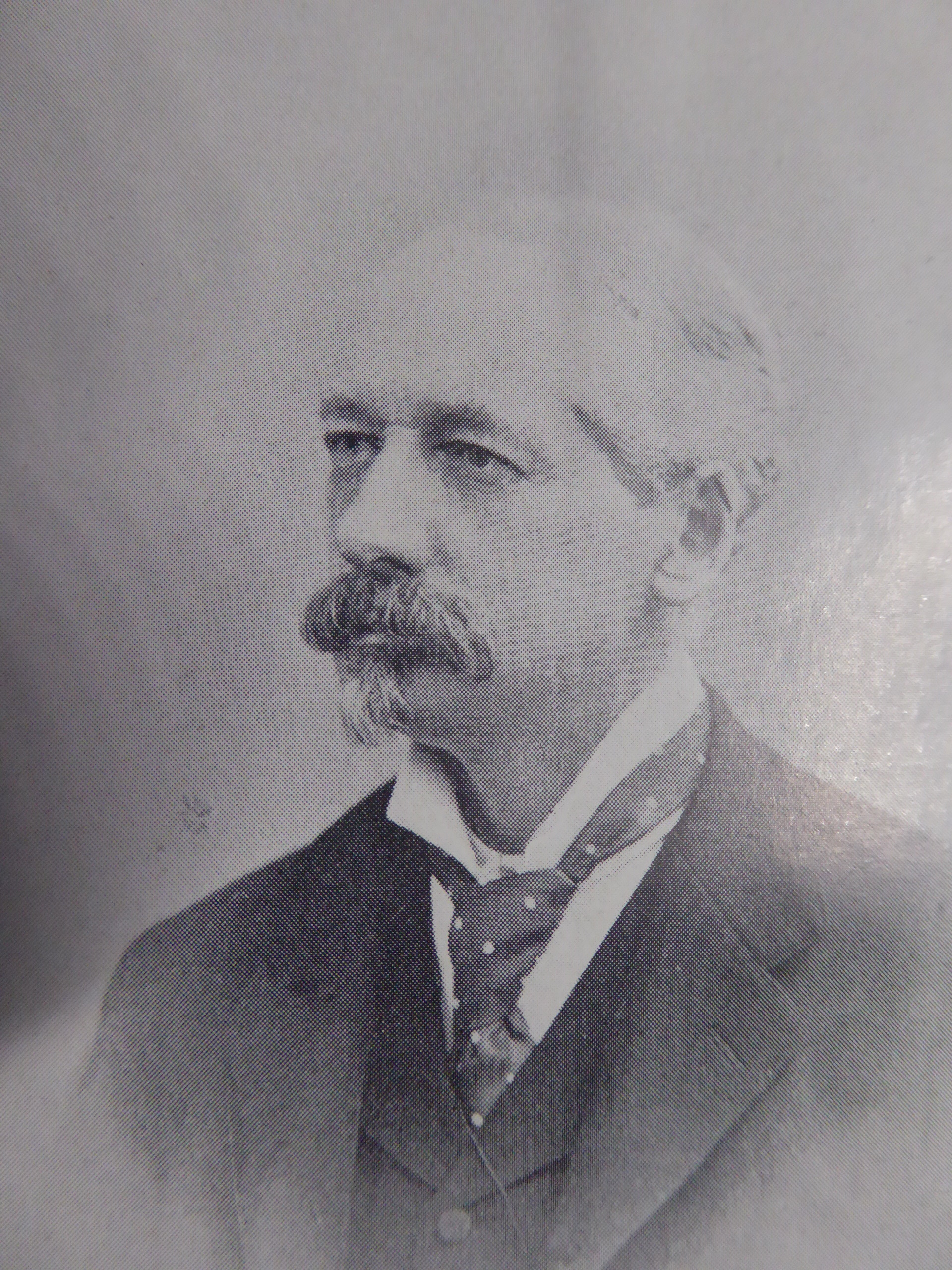
Henry Worsley-Taylor, c.1901

Sir Henry Wilson Worsley-Taylor (1847 – 27 June 1924), 1st Baronet of Moreton Hall, was an English politician.

Henry Wilson Worsley, born in 1847 was the son of James Worsley of Laund, Accrington. He was educated at Harrow School and took a degree at Exeter College, Oxford. After inheriting the estates of Miss Pilling Taylor of Moreton Hall, Whalley, Lancashire he added the name Taylor. He was called to the Bar in 1871. He was appointed Chairman of the Lancashire Quarter Sessions at Preston in 1890 and held the Recordership of Preston from 1893-1898.

Worsley-Taylor was elected as the Conservative Member of Parliament (MP) for Blackpool, Lancashire on 21 December 1900 until 12 January 1906.

Worsley-Taylor married Harriette Sayer Watkin, the daughter of Edward Watkin, fellow MP, Great Central Railway board member and Lancastrian. His great grand-daughter was Annette Worsley-Taylor, founder of London Fashion Week.

Parliament of the United Kingdom
Preceded by Sir Matthew Ridley	Member of Parliament for Blackpool; 1900 – 1906	Succeeded by Wilfrid Ashley
Baronetage of the United Kingdom
New creation	Baronet (of Moreton Hall); 1917–1924	Succeeded by James Worsley-Taylor
