= 1886 Blackpool by-election =

UK parliamentary by-election

The 1886 Blackpool by-election was held on 20 August 1886 after the incumbent Conservative MP Frederick Stanley was elevated to the House of Lords and thus had to vacate his seat in the House of Commons of the United Kingdom. The seat was won by the Conservative candidate Sir Matthew Ridley.

1886 Blackpool by-election
Party	Candidate	Votes	%	±%
Conservative	Matthew White Ridley	6,263	71.4	N/A
Liberal	John Ormerod Pilkington	2,513	28.6	New
Majority		3,750	42.8	N/A
Turnout		8,776	73.7	N/A
Registered electors		11,903		
Conservative hold		Swing	N/A	
