= 1900 Blackpool by-election =

UK parliamentary by-election

The 1900 Blackpool by-election was held on 21 December 1900 after the incumbent Conservative MP Sir Matthew Ridley was appointed Crown Stewart and Bailiff of the Chiltern Hundreds on 11 December 1900, ahead of being elevated to the peerage as Viscount Ridley on 17 December 1900. Ridley had been Home Secretary from 1895 to 12 November 1900.

The seat was retained by the Conservative candidate Henry Worsley-Taylor.

Blackpool by-election, 1900
Party	Candidate	Votes	%	±%
Conservative	Henry Worsley-Taylor	7,059	55.8	N/A
Liberal	Joseph Heap	5,589	44.2	New
Majority		1,470	11.6	N/A
Turnout		12,648	78.2	N/A
Conservative hold		Swing	N/A	
