= RV Bernicia =

Research vessel

History

United Kingdom
- Name: RV Bernicia
- Namesake: Bernicia, a sixth-century Anglo Saxon Kingdom
- Owner: Newcastle University
- Operator: Newcastle University Department of Marine Science and Technology
- Port of registry: Newcastle upon Tyne
- Route: Northumberland Sea Area
- Ordered: 1973
- Builder: Ryton Marine, Wallsend, UK
- Commissioned: March 1973
- Identification: Call sign MLER
- Fate: Sold

Netherlands
- Name: RV Bernicia
- Owner: Bernicia Netherlands
- Operator: Bernicia Netherlands
- Route: Rotterdam Area
- Identification: Call sign PB4310
- Status: In service as of August 2013

General characteristics
- Class & type: DTp VIIIA, Lloyds 100A1
- Type: Research Vessel
- Tonnage: 46.25 GT
- Displacement: 58.24 tonnes
- Length: 16.2 m (53 ft) LOA
- Beam: 4.72 m (15.5 ft)
- Draught: 2.59 m (8.5 ft)
- Depth: 3.39 m (11.1 ft) (deck edge to keel)
- Decks: 1 main deck with 20m² deck space
- Installed power: Main engine: 1 × 126.8kW (170hp) at 1500 RPM; Auxiliary engines: 1 × 41.8kW (56hp)
- Propulsion: 1 × Gardener 8LXB high-speed engine; 1 × Perkins diesel engine for auxiliary power
- Speed: 9.0 knots (16.7 km/h; 10.4 mph) (maximum), 8.0 knots (14.8 km/h; 9.2 mph) (cruising)
- Range: 5000nm
- Endurance: 3 days
- Boats & landing craft carried: 4m inflatable
- Complement: 4 × crew and 12 × scientists
- Crew: 1 × Officer, 3 × crew

The RV Bernicia is a research vessel owned and operated by diving organisation Bernicia Netherlands. It was previously operated by Newcastle University's Department of Marine Science and Technology, where it was used for research and teaching in the North Sea and in river estuaries, largely in the area of marine biology.

== Operational history ==
The RV Bernicia is a small trawler-type vessel approximately 16 metres in length with hydraulically operated windlass and winches, and a crane on the aft deck. The research vessel was designed by Naval Architects from Newcastle University. When used by the university it was berthed at and operated from Blyth. In 2011 the Bernicia was replaced by a newer research vessel that was also partly designed by students at the university. This new vessel is RV The Princess Royal. RV Bernicia was sold to diving organisation Bernicia Netherlands.

== Namesake ==
The RV Bernicia is named after the ancient Anglo Saxon Kingdom of the same name.
