= RV The Princess Royal =

History

United Kingdom
- Name: RV The Princess Royal
- Namesake: Princess Anne of the United Kingdom
- Owner: Newcastle University
- Operator: Newcastle University Department of Marine Science and Technology
- Route: Coastal waters, rivers and estuaries of North East England.
- Builder: Alnmarintec, Blyth, UK
- Yard number: ALN 109
- Christened: 4 February 2011
- Identification: Call sign: 2EYM2; MMSI number: 235089188
- Status: In service

General characteristics
- Type: Research Vessel
- Displacement: 35 t (34 long tons; 39 short tons)
- Length: 18.9 m (62 ft) LOA
- Beam: 7.42 m (24.3 ft)
- Draught: 1.8 m (5.9 ft)
- Installed power: 1,200 hp (890 kW)
- Propulsion: 2 × Cummins QSM11 diesel engines; 2 × fixed pitch propellers
- Speed: 20 knots (37 km/h; 23 mph) (maximum), 15 knots (28 km/h; 17 mph) (cruising)
- Range: 400nm in sea state 4-5
- Boats & landing craft carried: 5m inflatable RIB

RV The Princess Royal is a research vessel owned and operated by Newcastle University as part of the School of Marine Science and Technology. Designed by in-house naval architects from the school, The Princess Royal replaced the previous RV Bernicia as the school's research vessel.

== Design ==
The Princess Royal has a twin hull, deep-vee form with each hull having a bulbous bow. The hull form aims to improve seakeeping, stability and fuel efficiency and was designed by the School of Marine Science and Technology at Newcastle University. The ship was built by Alnmarintec in Blyth to MCA category 2 requirements and is constructed from aluminium alloy.

The Princess Royal is equipped with a 6.5 tonne-metre knuckle boom crane, a 2 tonne hydraulic A-frame, two trawl winches, a pot hauler two ROV winches and a 5-metre Rigid Inflatable Boat.

Powering the vessel are two MAN D2676 diesel engines coupled to two fixed-pitch propellers.

== Namesake ==
The Princess Royal is named after Princess Anne who christened the ship during a ceremony in Blyth on 4 February 2011.
