= Lord Henry Percy =

British Army general and recipient of the Victoria Cross

General Lord Henry Percy VC KCB
- Colonel Percy in c. 1859
- Born: Henry Hugh Manvers Percy; 22 August 1817; Cobham, Surrey, England
- Died: 3 December 1877 (aged 60); Eaton Square, Belgravia, England
- Burial place: Westminster Abbey, London
- Alma mater: Eton College
- Relatives: George Percy, 5th Duke of Northumberland (father)
- Military career
- Allegiance: United Kingdom
- Branch: British Army
- Service years: 1836–1862; 1862–1877 (Half-pay)
- Rank: General
- Unit: Grenadier Guards
- Commands: 1st Battalion Grenadier Guards; Curragh Camp
- Conflicts: Rebellions of 1837; Crimean War: Battle of Alma; Battle of Balaclava; Battle of Inkerman; Siege of Sevastopol; Franco-Prussian War
- Awards: Victoria Cross; Knight Commander of the Order of the Bath; Légion d'Honneur (France); Order of the Medjidie (Ottoman Empire)
- Other work: Member of Parliament

General Lord Henry Hugh Manvers Percy, VC, KCB (22 August 1817 – 3 December 1877) was a British Army officer and a recipient of the Victoria Cross, the highest award for gallantry in the face of the enemy that can be awarded to British and Commonwealth forces. Outside his military career he was briefly a Conservative Member of Parliament.

== Background ==
Henry Percy, fourth child and third son of George Percy, Lord Lovaine (later 2nd Earl of Beverley) by Louisa Harcourt Stuart-Wortley, third daughter of James Stuart-Wortley-Mackenzie, was born at Burwood House, Cobham, Surrey, on 22 August 1817. He was educated at Eton. He was styled Lord Henry Percy from 1865 after his father became 5th Duke of Northumberland at the age of 86. A collection of his papers is held at Alnwick Castle, the seat of the Duke of Northumberland.

== Military career and Crimean War ==
He entered the British Army as an ensign in the Grenadier Guards on 1 July 1836, and was present during the insurrection in Canada in 1838. Aged 37, he served as a captain and lieutenant-colonel in the 3rd Battalion, Grenadier Guards, during the Crimean War of 1854–5. He was present at the Battle of Alma (where he was shot through the right arm), the Battle of Balaklava, the Battle of Inkerman (where he was again wounded), and the Siege of Sebastopol.

For his valour at the Battle of Inkerman on 5 November 1854 he was awarded the Victoria Cross with the following citation:

At a moment when the Guards were some distance from the Sandbag Battery at the Battle of Inkerman Colonel Percy charged singly into the Battery, followed immediately by the Guards; the embrasures of the battery, as also the parapet, were held by the Russians who kept up a most severe fire of musketry. At the Battle of Inkerman, Colonel Percy found himself with many men of various regiments who had charged too far, nearly surrounded by the Russians, and without ammunition. Colonel Percy, by his knowledge of the ground, although wounded, extricated these men, and, passing under a heavy fire from the Russians then in the Sandbag Battery, brought them safe to where ammunition was to be obtained, thereby saving some 50 men and enabling them to renew the combat. He received the approval of His Royal Highness the Duke of Cambridge for this action on the spot. Colonel Percy was engaged with and put hors de combat, a Russian soldier.

The subalterns in the company which Lieutenant-Colonel Percy commanded at Inkerman were Henry Neville and Sir James Fergusson, Bt. Neville was killed and Fergusson was wounded. Percy himself suffered during the action a black eye, gashes to the face and severe contusion on the back of the head. Forty-four members of his company were killed or wounded in the battle.

On Boxing Day 1854, Percy was taken ill with dysentery and Crimean Fever. He was therefore evacuated to the General Hospital, Scutari the following month. He survived the very high death rates which were prevalent in the hospitals of Scutari that winter and by mid February 1855 was well enough to be invalided back to England. He returned voluntarily to the Crimea in May and rejoined his regiment in the trenches before Sebastopol.

He was promoted to full colonel in the summer of 1855, and then held the local rank of brigadier general in command of the British-Italian Legion in Turin, where he arrived in August. The British-Italian Legion was a mercenary force raised following the passage of the 1854 Foreign Enlistment Act to fight for the allies (France, Great Britain and Turkey) in the Crimean War, modelled along the lines of similar foreign legions raised in the Napoleonic Wars. The Kingdom of Sardinia had already entered the Crimean war on the side of the allies and Count Cavour, Prime Minister of Sardinia, was in theory supportive of the British Government and Percy's efforts to recruit and train a fighting force in Turin. However, the project became mired in bureaucracy, suffered from lack of funds and inadequate resources and was eventually rendered redundant by the fall of Sevastopol in September 1855 and a formal end to hostilities six months later. Given this, Percy resigned his command of the British-Italian Legion in October 1855 in a state of total exasperation.

After leaving the British-Italian Legion, Colonel Percy was asked by Lord Stratford de Redcliffe, British Ambassador to Turkey, to attempt to relieve the Siege of Kars, Armenia, which was being defended by Brigadier-General Williams. However, Kars fell to the Russians on 28 November 1855, the day after Percy arrived in Constantinople, so the expedition was called off before it got under way.

Colonel Percy was an accomplished linguist and Turkophile, so in January 1856, after the armistice in the Crimea but before the signing of the Treaty of Paris in March 1856, he was ordered by General Codrington, Commander-in-chief of the British Army in the Crimea, to reconnoitre possible landing places in Asia Minor in case of a continuation of hostilities along the Caucasus front.

== Relations with the royal family ==
From 29 June 1855 he was an aide-de-camp to the Queen – a post he held until 10 February 1865. He was gazetted for the Victoria Cross (VC) on 5 May 1857. As the most senior officer in the British Army to be awarded the VC during the Crimean War, Percy was on the occasion of the first investiture of the Victoria Cross in Hyde Park, London, on 26 June 1857 tasked with commanding the 62 recipients who had the decoration pinned to their breasts by Queen Victoria that day.

In the summer of 1861, as commanding officer at the Curragh, he was tasked with overseeing the Prince of Wales' military induction. Colonel Percy was well regarded by the royal family: Prince Albert had previously recommended that Percy's infantry manual, Brigade Movements (1853) be distributed to every officer in the Brigade of Guards. In spite of the young Prince not being given as much commendation or responsibility in matters of drill as he had hoped, he liked Percy 'very much' – perhaps because the latter, being a strict disciplinarian, insisted on treating him just like any other junior officer. However, the Curragh visit was marred by the Prince's 'fall', following which Queen Victoria blamed her son for Prince Albert's death. 'The fall' came in the form of initiation in carnal pleasure with the actress Nellie Clifden, as arranged by junior officers at the Curragh.

== Later military career ==
On the occurrence of the Trent Affair in December 1861, Percy was sent to New Brunswick in command of the first battalion of the Grenadier Guards. He had been promoted to be major in 1860, but retired from active service on 3 October 1862 owing to the chronic ill health he had suffered ever since the Crimean War. However, he remained on half-pay and briefly commanded a brigade at Aldershot – the place to which he and another Grenadier officer, Col. F. W. Hamilton, had first brought the army in 1853 when they selected Aldershot Heath and its surrounding area as a new training ground.

In 1870, during the Franco-Prussian War, he was sent by the Duke of Cambridge, Commander-in-Chief, as an observer with the Prussian Army at Sedan.

On 24 May 1873 he was gazetted a Knight Commander of the Order of the Bath. He was also rewarded for his military services by being appointed to the colonelcy of the 89th (The Princess Victoria's) Regiment of Foot on 28 May 1874. He became a full general on 1 October 1877.

== Politics ==
He succeeded his brother, Lord Lovaine, as Conservative Member of Parliament (MP) for Northumberland North from 1865 to 1868.

He was found dead in his bed at his residence, 40 Eaton Square, London, on 3 December 1877, and was buried in the Percy family vault in St. Nicholas' Chapel, Westminster Abbey on 7 December. He was unmarried.

Parliament of the United Kingdom
Preceded by Lord Lovaine and Sir Matthew Ridley	Member of Parliament for Northumberland North; 1865–1868; With: Sir Matthew Ridley	Succeeded by Henry Percy and Matthew Ridley
