= George Bennet, 7th Earl of Tankerville =

British peer

The Right Honourable The Earl of Tankerville
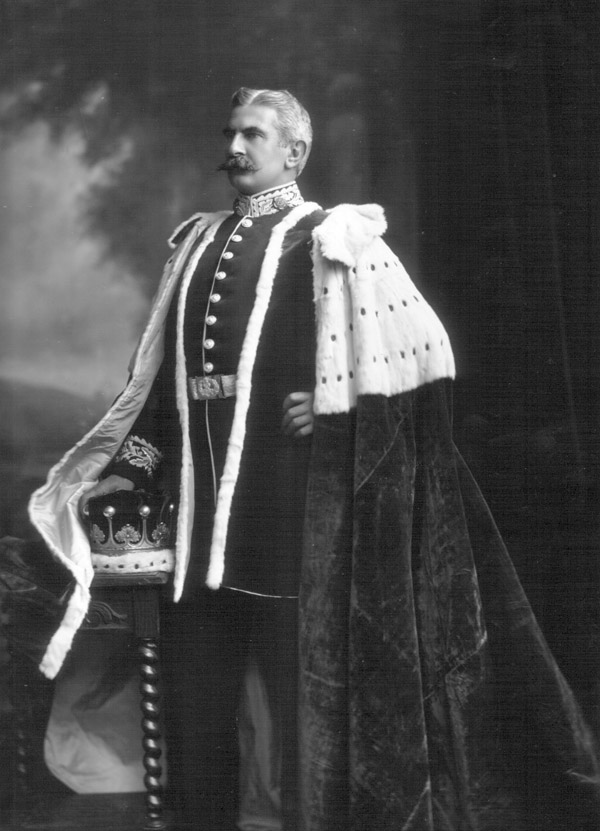
- Lord Tankerville wearing coronation robes, 1902

Personal details
- Born: George Montagu Bennet; 30 March 1852; Claridge's Hotel, London
- Died: 9 July 1931 (aged 79); Chillingham Castle, Northumberland
- Spouse: Leonora Sophia van Marter (m. 1895)
- Relations: George Montagu, 6th Duke of Manchester (grandfather)
- Parent(s): Charles Bennet, 6th Earl of Tankerville; Lady Olivia Montagu
- Education: Radley College

George Montagu Bennet, 7th Earl of Tankerville (30 March 1852 – 9 July 1931), was a British peer, Royal Navy and British Army officer, cowpuncher, circus clown, and revival meeting singer.

== Early life ==
Bennet was born at Claridge's Hotel, Brook Street, London on 30 March 1852. He was the second son of Charles Bennet, 6th Earl of Tankerville and Olivia Montagu. His sister, Lady Isa Louise Bennet, was married to John Ramsay, 13th Earl of Dalhousie. His elder brother, Charles, Lord Ossulton, the heir apparent, died, unmarried, of cholera in India on 29 June 1879, while serving with the Rifle Brigade. George was styled Lord Bennet at the time he became heir apparent. As the only surviving son, George succeeded his father as Earl of Tankerville on the death of the latter on 18 December 1899.

His paternal grandparents were Charles Bennet, 5th Earl of Tankerville and the former Armandine Corisande de Gramont (a daughter of the Antoine VIII, 8th Duke of Gramont). His maternal grandparents were George Montagu, 6th Duke of Manchester and the former Millicent Sparrow (a granddaughter of Arthur Acheson, 1st Earl of Gosford).

== Career ==
He entered the Royal Navy in 1865, was midshipman 1867 to 1869, then left to undergo public school at Radley from 1869 to 1870. He entered the army, becoming a lieutenant in the Rifle Brigade in 1872, eventually serving as aide-de-camp to the Lord Lieutenant of Ireland from 1876 to 1880.

He travelled in America in 1892, becoming friends with the two revivalists, Ira D. Sankey and Dwight L. Moody, accompanying them in both America and Britain. He spent some time as a cowpuncher in the western states.

Known as "The Singing Earl," he sang hymns during his revival work, and took part in concerts in the north of England. (His voice is described, confusingly, both as a "rich bass-baritone" and a "fine tenor"). He studied voice with Giovanni Sbriglia.

Lord Tankerville made American headlines in January 1912 when he placed his 14-year-old son (and eventual successor) in a Boston school, saying he wanted him to be "educated in a world where every one worked."

== Family ==
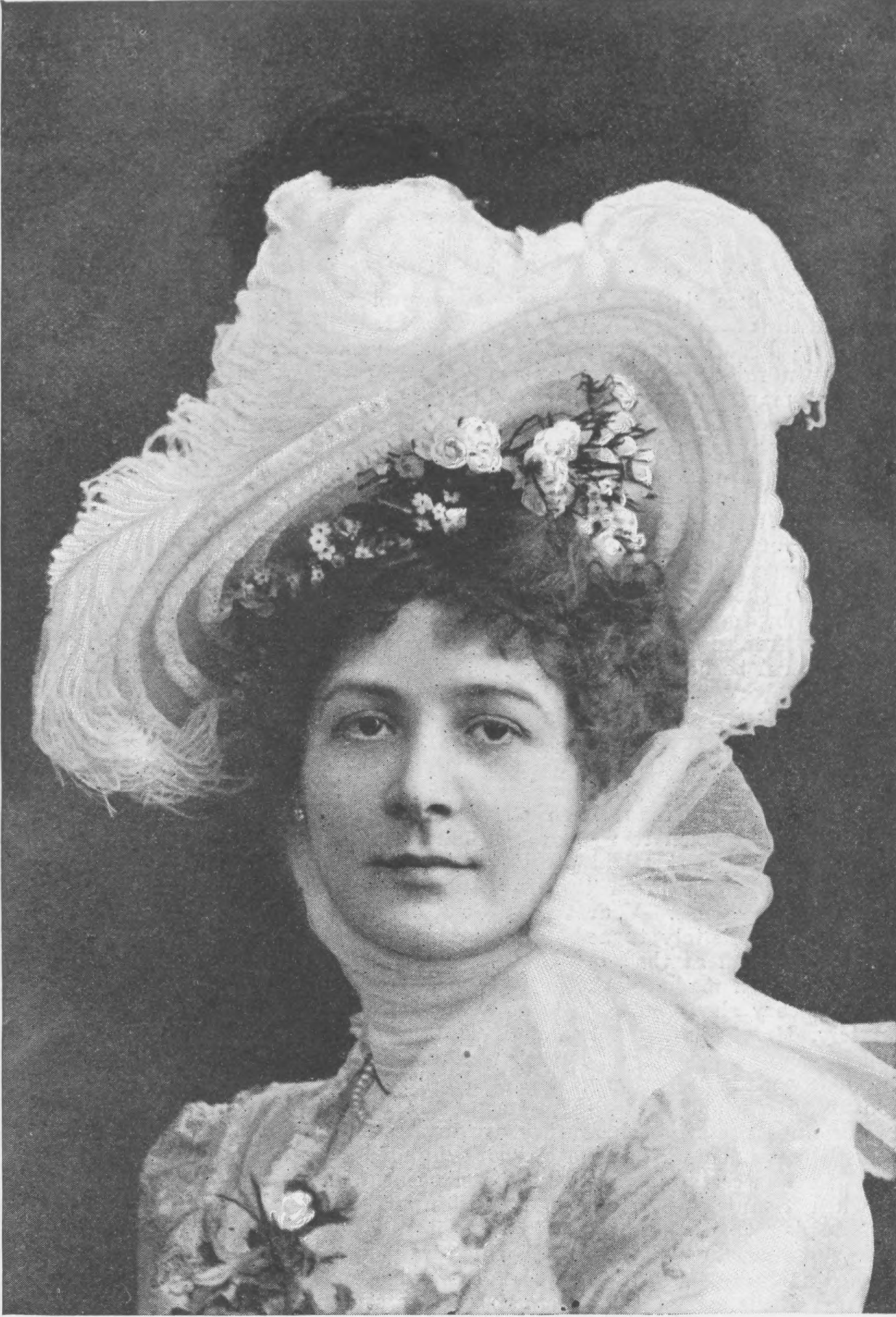
Leonora van Marter

Lord Tankerville, who for a time was a clown in the circus, met his future wife, Leonora Sophia van Marter (d. 1949), when he turned a somersault over a sofa in a New York drawing-room, nearly falling into her lap. They married in Tacoma, Washington on 23 October 1895. Prior to their marriage, Leonora, a daughter of Dr. James Gilbert van Marter, had been a music teacher in New York. Together, they had four children (two sons, two daughters):

- Hon. Georgina Bennet (1896–1896), who died in infancy.
- Charles Bennet, 8th Earl of Tankerville (1897–1971), who married Roberta Mitchell (née Nolan) in 1920. They divorced in 1930 and remarried to Violet Pallin in 1930.
- Lady Ida Olivia Sophie Bennet (1898–1900), who died in childhood.
- Hon. George William Bennet (1903–1981), who married Constance Clare Wace in 1929.

Lord Tankerville died at the family seat of Chillingham Castle, Northumberland, 9 July 1931, of the effects of a gastric haemorrhage, aged 79, and was cremated and buried at Chillingham. After his death the Chillingham Estate was broken up, and the Countess of Tankerville moved to Edinburgh, Scotland, where she died on 15 February 1949.

=== Descendants ===
Through his eldest son, he was a grandfather of Charles Augustus Grey Bennet, 9th Earl of Tankerville (1921–1980), who married Virginia Diether and Georgiana Wilson; George Arthur Grey Bennet (1925–2001), who married Hazel Judson; Ian Bennet (b. 1935); and Corisande Bennet (b. 1938), who married Lt. Cdr. Timothy Bain Smith.

Peerage of Great Britain
Preceded by Charles Bennet	Earl of Tankerville; 1899–1931	Succeeded by Charles Bennet
