= Hugh Meyler =

British politician (1875–1929)

Hugh Meyler

Hugh Mowbray Meyler CBE DSO MC (25 June 1875 – 30 April 1929) was a British lawyer, army officer, balloon observer, and politician. After qualifying as a solicitor, and then serving in the British Army in the Second Boer War, he was a Unionist Party member of the first Parliament of the Union of South Africa from 1910 to 1914. After further army service in the First World War and in Ireland in the 1920s, he was the Liberal Party Member of Parliament (MP) for Blackpool in the UK from 1923 to 1924.

== Early life ==
Meyler was born near Taunton, in Somerset, where his father was the town clerk. He was educated at King's College, Taunton and Allhallows Grammar School, Honiton, and then studied at the University of London. He qualified as a solicitor in 1898, briefly working in partnership with Herbert Byard Sheppard in Taunton. He was also an officer in the 2nd Volunteer Battalion of the Somersetshire Light Infantry.

== South Africa ==
Meyler left Taunton to serve in the Second Boer War, enlisting with the Imperial Yeomanry and serving with the Rhodesian Field Force in 1899 and early 1900. While in the field, he was commissioned into a regular army unit as a second lieutenant in the Middlesex Regiment on 5 May 1900, and served in the 2nd battalion of that regiment, where he was promoted to lieutenant on 29 March 1901. He took part in operations east of Pretoria in the Transvaal during Summer 1900, and later served with Mounted Infantry in the Orange River Colony. After the end of the war in June 1902, he left Cape Town for the United Kingdom four months later on the SS Orient. For his service, he was awarded the Queen's South Africa Medal, the King's South Africa Medal, and the Union of South Africa Commemoration Medal. He resigned his commission in the regular army in February 1903, and joined the reserve of officers, and then resigned from the reserve in 1911. He provided the British army with intelligence services during the Natal Rebellion in 1906, but his application for the Natal Native Rebellion Medal was declined.

He married the daughter of Major General Alexander Lyon Emerson, and returned to South Africa to become a lawyer in Natal. He campaigned for the Colony of Natal to join the Union of South Africa, and was elected as a Unionist member of the House of Assembly in the first Parliament of South Africa in 1910, defeating Frederick Robert Moor, Prime Minister of Natal.

== First World War ==
He returned to England in 1914 to serve in the First World War, rejoining the Middlesex Regiment as a captain, and serving in France from January 1915. He was gassed at Bellewarde near Ypres in 1915 and awarded the Military Cross in June 1915. He transferred to the Border Regiment in October 1915, and then joined the Royal Flying Corps in March 1916, first as wing adjutant and then training as a balloon observation officer. He served as an observer in France with No.5 and No.8 Kite Balloon Company, in vulnerable hydrogen-filled balloons, and became flight commander in August 1916. Promoted to temporary major in June 1917 and temporary lieutenant colonel in November 1917, he commanded 2nd Balloon Wing. Despite his rank, he continued observing, and was injured in a parachute descent in September 1918, recording 123 hours of flying time in all.

He was mentioned in despatches in June 1915 and December 1918. He was awarded the Belgian Croix de Guerre (with palm) and the Croix de Chevalier (5th class) of the Belgian Order of Leopold II (with swords and palm) in August 1917, and the Distinguished Service Order in January 1919. He was also awarded the 1914-15 Star, the British War Medal and the Victory Medal (known as Pip, Squeak and Wilfred).

== Post-war career ==
Meyler stood for Parliament in the 1918 general election, coming third in the Bethnal Green South West constituency, with 23.4% of the votes. He remained in the army, rejoining the Border Regiment and serving as a Legal Officer in Ireland. He was appointed a Commander of the Order of the British Empire (CBE) in January 1923.

At the 1922 general election, he stood in the more promising Blackpool constituency, where he lost by only 166 votes to the sitting Conservative MP Leonard Molloy. Molloy did not contest the 1923 general election, and Meyler won the seat with a majority of over 3,000 votes, and he retired from the army. However, at the 1924 general election, Sir Walter de Frece retook the seat for the Conservatives. Meyler did not stand for Parliament again. He continued to speak in public, particularly on issues relating to South Africa.

He became a "poor man's lawyer" in Westminster and Pimlico, but his legal practice did not prosper, and he shot himself in 1929.

Parliament of the United Kingdom
Preceded by Leonard Molloy	Member of Parliament for Blackpool; 1923–1924	Succeeded by Sir Walter de Frece
