= Blackpool (constituency) =

Parliamentary constituency in the United Kingdom, 1885–1945

- Former borough constituency for the House of Commons

1885–1945
- Seats: one
- Created from: North Lancashire
- Replaced by: Blackpool North and Blackpool South

Blackpool was a parliamentary constituency centred on the town of Blackpool in Lancashire. It returned one Member of Parliament (MP) to the House of Commons of the Parliament of the United Kingdom.

The constituency was created for the 1885 general election, and abolished for the 1945 general election, when it was replaced by the new Blackpool North and Blackpool South constituencies.

== Boundaries ==
1885–1918: The Municipal Borough of Preston, the Sessional Divisions of Amounderness and Kirkham, and part of the Sessional Division of Leyland.

1918–1945: The County Borough of Blackpool, the Urban Districts of Bispham with Norbreck, Lytham, and St Anne's-on-Sea, and part of the parish of Carleton.

== Members of Parliament ==
Year	Member	Party
1885	Frederick Stanley	Conservative
1886	Sir Matthew Ridley	Conservative
1900	Henry Worsley-Taylor	Conservative
1906	Wilfrid Ashley	Conservative
1918	Albert Lindsay Parkinson	Unionist
1922	Leonard Molloy	Unionist
1923	Hugh Meyler	Liberal
1924	Sir Walter de Frece	Unionist
1931	Clifford Erskine-Bolst	Conservative
1935	Roland Robinson	Conservative
1945	constituency abolished	

== Election results ==
=== Elections in the 1880s ===
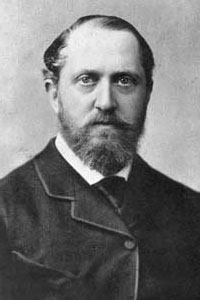
Stanley

General election 1885: Blackpool
Party	Candidate	Votes	%	±%
Conservative	Frederick Stanley	Unopposed		
Conservative win (new seat)				

General election 1886: Blackpool
Party	Candidate	Votes	%	±%
Conservative	Frederick Stanley	Unopposed		
Conservative hold				

Stanley was appointed President of the Board of Trade and elevated to the peerage, becoming Lord Stanley of Preston, requiring a by-election.

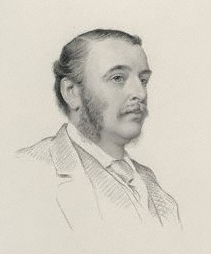
Ridley

By-election, 20 Aug 1886: Blackpool
Party	Candidate	Votes	%	±%
Conservative	Matthew White Ridley	6,263	71.4	N/A
Liberal	John Ormerod Pilkington	2,513	28.6	New
Majority		3,750	42.8	N/A
Turnout		8,776	73.7	N/A
Registered electors		11,903		
Conservative hold		Swing	N/A	

=== Elections in the 1890s ===
General election 1892: Blackpool
Party	Candidate	Votes	%	±%
Conservative	Matthew White Ridley	6,536	65.2	N/A
Liberal	Thomas Walker	3,487	34.8	N/A
Majority		3,049	30.4	N/A
Turnout		10,023	76.4	N/A
Registered electors		13,124		
Conservative hold		Swing	N/A	

By-election, 1895: Blackpool
Party	Candidate	Votes	%	±%
Conservative	Matthew White Ridley	Unopposed		
Conservative hold				

General election 1895: Blackpool
Party	Candidate	Votes	%	±%
Conservative	Matthew White Ridley	Unopposed		
Conservative hold				

=== Elections in the 1900s ===
General election 1900: Blackpool
Party	Candidate	Votes	%	±%
Conservative	Matthew White Ridley	Unopposed		
Conservative hold				

1900 Blackpool by-election
Party	Candidate	Votes	%	±%
Conservative	Henry Worsley-Taylor	7,059	55.8	N/A
Liberal	Joseph Heap	5,589	44.2	New
Majority		1,470	11.6	N/A
Turnout		12,648	78.2	N/A
Registered electors		16,807		
Conservative hold		Swing	N/A	

Phillipps

General election 1906: Blackpool
Party	Candidate	Votes	%	±%
Conservative	Wilfrid Ashley	10,139	58.9	N/A
Liberal	Vivian Phillipps	7,078	41.1	N/A
Majority		3,061	17.8	N/A
Turnout		17,217	84.7	N/A
Registered electors		20,339		
Conservative hold		Swing	N/A	

=== Elections in the 1910s ===
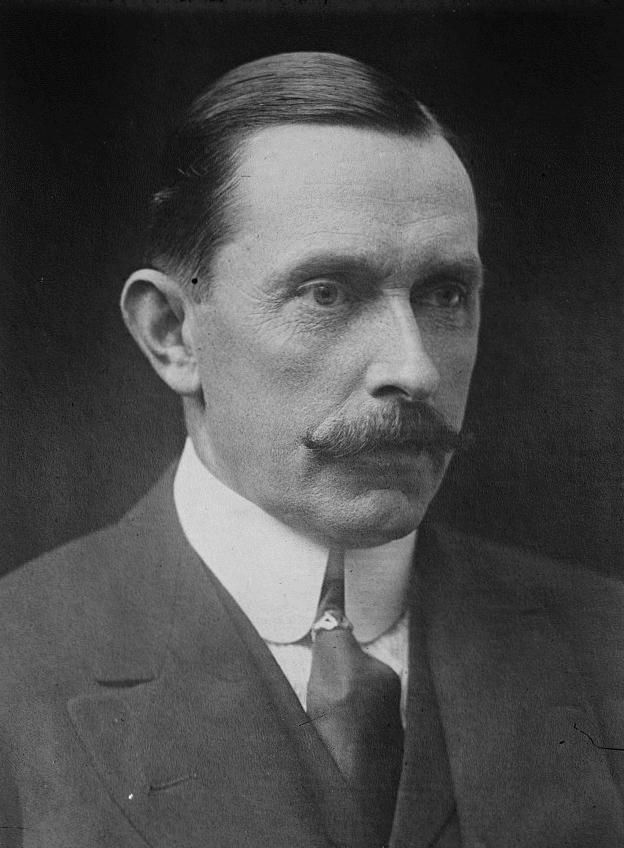
Ashley

General election January 1910: Blackpool
Party	Candidate	Votes	%	±%
Conservative	Wilfrid Ashley	11,567	59.3	+0.4
Liberal	Samuel Hodgkinson	7,943	40.7	−0.4
Majority		3,624	18.6	+0.8
Turnout		19,510	87.3	+2.6
Conservative hold		Swing	+0.4	

General election December 1910: Blackpool
Party	Candidate	Votes	%	±%
Conservative	Wilfrid Ashley	Unopposed		
Conservative hold				

General Election 1914–15:

Another General Election was required to take place before the end of 1915. The political parties had been making preparations for an election to take place and by July 1914, the following candidates had been selected;

- Unionist: Wilfrid Ashley
- Liberal:

General election 1918: Blackpool
Party		Candidate	Votes	%	±%
C	Unionist	Albert Lindsay Parkinson	15,818	55.9	N/A
	Independent Progressive	Clive F Critchley*	9,862	34.9	New
	Labour	Allan Gee	2,608	9.2	New
Majority			5,956	21.0	N/A
Turnout			28,288	68.0	N/A
Registered electors			41,627		
	Unionist hold		Swing	N/A	
C indicates candidate endorsed by the coalition government.

* supported Coalition Government and received local Liberal Party support.

=== Elections in the 1920s ===
Meyler

General election 1922: Blackpool
Party	Candidate	Votes	%	±%
Unionist	Leonard Molloy	18,206	50.2	−5.7
Liberal	Hugh Meyler	18,040	49.8	New
Majority		166	0.4	−20.6
Turnout		36,246	78.3	+10.3
Registered electors		46,292		
Unionist hold		Swing	N/A	

General election 1923: Blackpool
Party	Candidate	Votes	%	±%
Liberal	Hugh Meyler	22,264	53.7	+3.9
Unionist	Victor Stanley	19,192	46.3	−3.9
Majority		3,072	7.4	N/A
Turnout		41,456	84.8	+6.5
Registered electors		48,865		
Liberal gain from Unionist		Swing	+3.9	

General election 1924: Blackpool
Party	Candidate	Votes	%	±%
Unionist	Walter de Frece	25,839	58.0	+11.7
Liberal	Hugh Meyler	18,712	42.0	−11.7
Majority		7,127	16.0	N/A
Turnout		44,551	85.8	+1.0
Registered electors		51,914		
Unionist gain from Liberal		Swing	+11.7	

General election 1929: Blackpool
Party	Candidate	Votes	%	±%
Unionist	Walter de Frece	32,912	46.8	−11.2
Liberal	Miles Mitchell	25,374	36.1	−5.9
Labour	Ernest Alfred Machin	12,049	17.1	New
Majority		7,538	10.7	−5.3
Turnout		70,335	81.1	−4.7
Registered electors		86,744		
Unionist hold		Swing	-2.7	

=== Elections in the 1930s ===
General election 1931: Blackpool
Party	Candidate	Votes	%	±%
Conservative	Clifford Erskine-Bolst	53,010	73.1	+26.3
Liberal	Edgar Wallace	19,524	26.9	−10.2
Majority		33,486	46.2	+35.5
Turnout		72,534		
Conservative hold		Swing		

- Wallace was opposed to the National Government

Purchase

General election 1935: Blackpool
Party	Candidate	Votes	%	±%
Conservative	Roland Robinson	48,514	65.2	−7.9
Labour	Harvey Thorneycroft	13,598	18.3	New
Liberal	Henry Purchase	12,245	16.47	−10.4
Majority		34,916	46.96	+0.8
Turnout		74,357	73.97	
Conservative hold		Swing		

=== Elections in the 1940s ===
General Election 1939–40: Another General Election was required to take place before the end of 1940. The political parties had been making preparations for an election to take place from 1939 and by the end of this year, the following candidates had been selected;

- Conservative: Roland Robinson
- Liberal: Adrian Liddell Hart
- Labour: Harvey Thorneycroft
