= Sir Matthew White Ridley, 4th Baronet =

Sir Matthew White Ridley, 4th Baronet (9 September 1807 – 25 September 1877) was a Conservative Party politician in the United Kingdom.

He was appointed High Sheriff of Northumberland for 1841 and then served as member of parliament (MP) for Northumberland North from 1859 to 1868.

He inherited the baronetcy on the death in 1836 of his father Matthew, and was in turn succeeded by his son Matthew, who was later ennobled as Viscount Ridley.

Parliament of the United Kingdom
Preceded by Lord Ossulton; Lord Lovaine	Member of Parliament for Northumberland North; 1859–1868; With: Lord Lovaine 1859–1865; Lord Henry Percy 1865–1868	Succeeded by Matthew White Ridley; Lord Henry Percy
Baronetage of Great Britain
Preceded by Matthew White Ridley	Baronet (of Blagdon); 1836–1877	Succeeded by Matthew White Ridley
