= Algernon Percy, 6th Duke of Northumberland =

British Conservative politician

His Grace The Duke of Northumberland KG PC DL
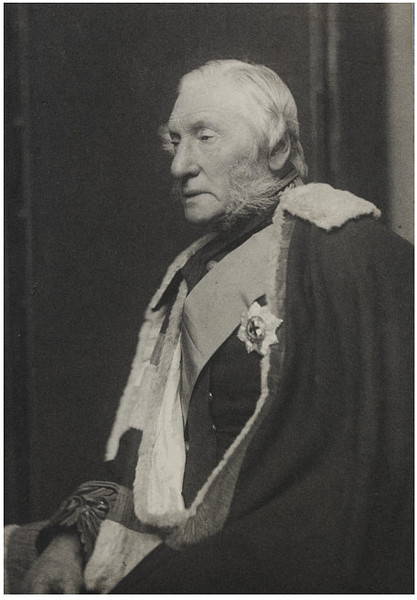
- Portrait by Frederick Hollyer, c. 1886

Paymaster General and Vice-President of the Board of Trade
- In office 3 March 1859 – 11 June 1859
- Monarch: Queen Victoria
- Prime Minister: The Earl of Derby
- Preceded by: The Earl of Donoughmore
- Succeeded by: James Wilson

Lord Privy Seal
- In office 4 February 1878 – 21 April 1880
- Monarch: Queen Victoria
- Prime Minister: The Earl of Beaconsfield
- Preceded by: The Earl of Beaconsfield
- Succeeded by: The Duke of Argyll

Personal details
- Born: 20 May 1810
- Died: 2 January 1899 (aged 88)
- Party: Conservative
- Spouse(s): Louisa Drummond (d. 1890)
- Children: Henry Percy, 7th Duke of Northumberland; Lord Algernon Percy
- Parent(s): George Percy, 5th Duke of Northumberland; Louisa Stuart-Wortley

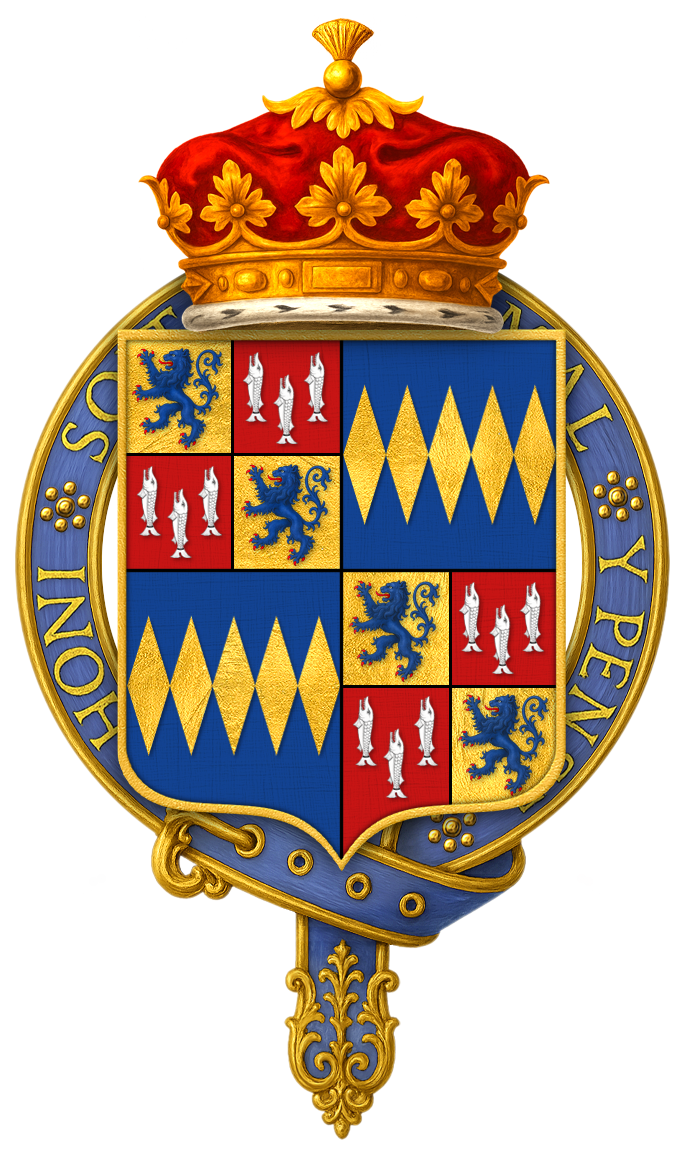
Quartered arms of Algernon Percy, 6th Duke of Northumberland, KG, PC, DL

Algernon George Percy, 6th Duke of Northumberland, KG, PC, DL (20 May 1810 – 2 January 1899), styled Lord Lovaine between 1830 and 1865 and Earl Percy between 1865 and 1867, was a British Conservative politician. He held office under the Earl of Derby as Paymaster General and Vice-President of the Board of Trade in 1859 and under Benjamin Disraeli as Lord Privy Seal between 1878 and 1880.

== Background ==
Northumberland was the eldest son of George Percy, Lord Lovaine, eldest son of Algernon Percy, 1st Earl of Beverley, a younger son of Hugh Percy, 1st Duke of Northumberland. From his father's succession as second Earl of Beverley in 1830, Percy was styled Lord Lovaine. In 1865, Lord Beverley inherited the dukedom of Northumberland from his first cousin, Algernon Percy, 4th Duke of Northumberland, and thenceforth Lovaine was styled Earl Percy. His mother was Louisa, daughter of the Hon. James Stuart-Wortley-Mackenzie, second son of Prime Minister John Stuart, 3rd Earl of Bute.

Lord Josceline Percy and Lieutenant-General Lord Henry Percy were his younger brothers.

Northumberland attended Eton College. He owned 186,000 acres with 181,000 in Northumberland and the remainder in Surrey, Middlesex and Durham.

== Political career ==
Northumberland sat in the House of Commons as Member of Parliament for Bere Alston between 1831 and 1832 and for Northumberland North between 1852 and 1865. He served Civil Lord of the Admiralty between 1858 and 1859 and as Paymaster General and Vice-President of the Board of Trade in 1859 in Lord Derby's second government. The latter year he was also sworn of the Privy Council.

In 1867 he succeeded in the dukedom on the death of his father and entered the House of Lords. He joined the Earl of Beaconsfield's second government as Lord Privy Seal in 1878, with a seat in the cabinet, a post he held until the fall of the government in 1880.

Northumberland was also Lord Lieutenant of Northumberland between 1877 and 1899. He was made a Knight of the Garter in 1886.

== Family ==
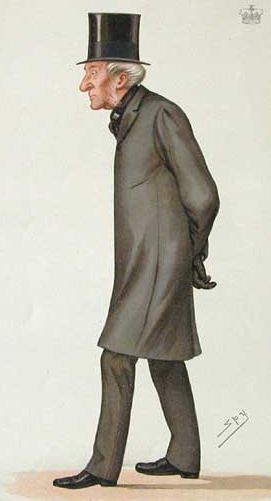
Caricature of The Duke of Northumberland, by Leslie Ward, c. 1884

Northumberland married Louisa, daughter of Henry Drummond, in 1845. She died in December 1890. Northumberland survived her by nine years and died in January 1899, aged 88. The Duke and his wife were buried in the Percy family vault in Westminster Abbey. He was succeeded in the dukedom by his eldest son, Henry, Earl Percy. Northumberland's second son Lord Algernon Percy was also a politician.

Parliament of the United Kingdom
Preceded by Christopher Blackett; David Lyon	Member of Parliament for Bere Alston; 1831 – 1832; With: David Lyon	Constituency disenfranchised
Preceded by Viscount Ossulston; Sir George Grey, Bt	Member of Parliament for Northumberland North; 1852 – 1865; With: Viscount Ossulston 1832–1859; Sir Matthew White Ridley, Bt 1859–1868	Succeeded by Sir Matthew White Ridley, Bt; Lord Henry Percy
Political offices
Preceded by Thomas Baring	Civil Lord of the Admiralty; 1858–1859	Succeeded by Hon. Frederick Lygon
Preceded by The Earl of Donoughmore	Paymaster General; 1859	Succeeded by James Wilson
Preceded by The Earl of Donoughmore	Vice-President of the Board of Trade; 1859	Succeeded by James Wilson
Preceded by The Earl of Beaconsfield	Lord Privy Seal; 1878–1880	Succeeded by The Duke of Argyll
Honorary titles
Preceded by The 3rd Earl Grey	Lord Lieutenant of Northumberland; 1878–1899	Succeeded by The 4th Earl Grey
Peerage of Great Britain
Preceded by George Percy	Duke of Northumberland; 1867–1899	Succeeded by Henry Percy
Preceded by George Percy	Baron Lovaine (descended by acceleration); 1867–1887	Succeeded by Henry Percy
