= Newcastle University Faculty of Science, Agriculture and Engineering =

Faculty of Newcastle University

Coordinates: 54.978°N 1.615°W

Faculty of Science, Agriculture and Engineering
- Type: Faculty
- Established: 1871 as the College of Physical Science
- Pro-Vice-Chancellor: Professor Stephanie Glendinning
- Location: Newcastle upon Tyne, Tyne & Wear, England
- Affiliations: Newcastle University
- Website: www.ncl.ac.uk/sage

The University of Newcastle upon Tyne Faculty of Science, Agriculture and Engineering (SAgE) is a faculty of Newcastle University. It was established in the city of Newcastle upon Tyne as the College of Physical Science in 1871, for the teaching of physical sciences, and was part of Durham University. It existed until 1937, when it joined the College of Medicine to form King's College, Durham.

The Faculty is structured around five academic Schools, four Research Institutes and a number of Research Centres and Networks. The Faculty also leads Newcastle University's campus in Singapore.

== Schools ==
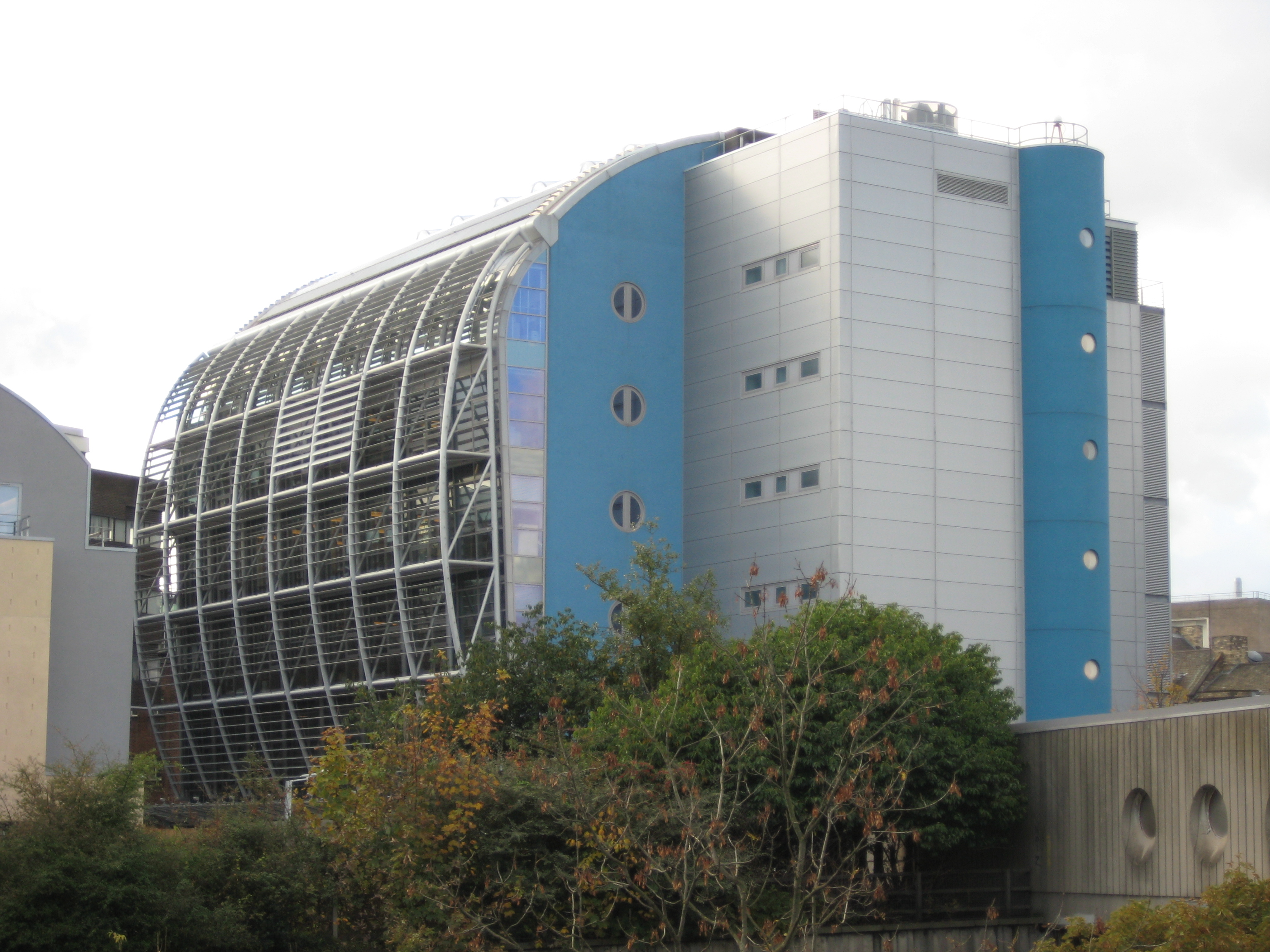
The award-winning energy efficient Devonshire Building

In its current form, the Faculty of Science, Agriculture and Engineering contains five schools:

- School of Computing
- School of Engineering
- School of Mathematics, Statistics and Physics
- School of Natural and Environmental Sciences
- Newcastle University in Singapore

== Research and degrees ==
The faculty offers over sixty undergraduate degrees, postgraduate degrees and research opportunities. Research funding sources include:

- The Biotechnology and Biological Sciences Research Council (BBSRC)
- The Natural Environment Research Council (NERC)
- The Engineering and Physical Sciences Research Council (EPSRC)
- The Science and Technology Facilities Council (STFC)
- The European Union
- The Environment Agency
- The Department for the Environment, Food and Rural Affairs (DEFRA)
- The Royal Society
