= Parrots (Prohibition of Import) Regulations 1930 =

- Statutory Rules and Orders
- Parliament of the United Kingdom
- Citation: SR&O 1930/299

Dates
- Commencement: 1930

The Parrots (Prohibition of Import) Regulations 1930 (SR&O 1930/299) were created to prevent the importation of parrots into the UK following consideration by the permanent Committee of the Office international d'hygiène publique, after the appearance of psittacosis in the worldwide psittacosis pandemic of 1929-1930. It added further duties for port medical officers of health. Parrots for research were exempt, but not parrots brought home by serviceman.
