= Northumberlandia =

Land sculpture by Charles Jencks

Coordinates: 55°5′18.2″N 1°37′41.1″W

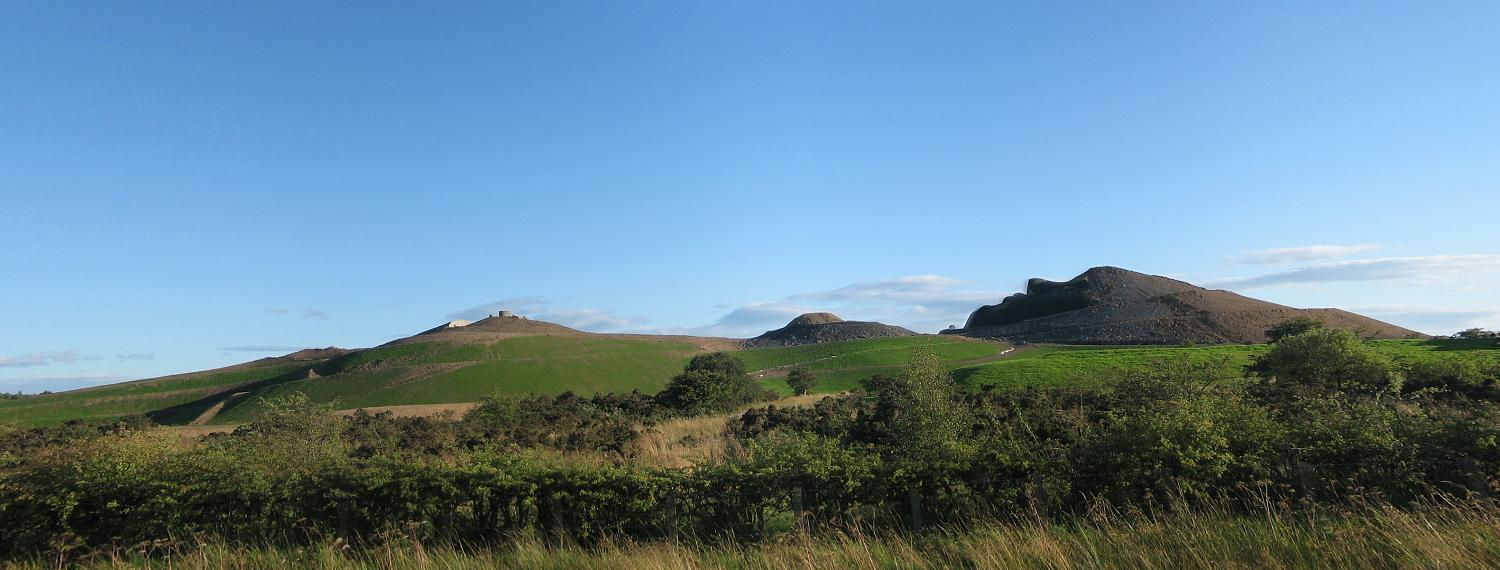
Northumberlandia under construction in August 2011

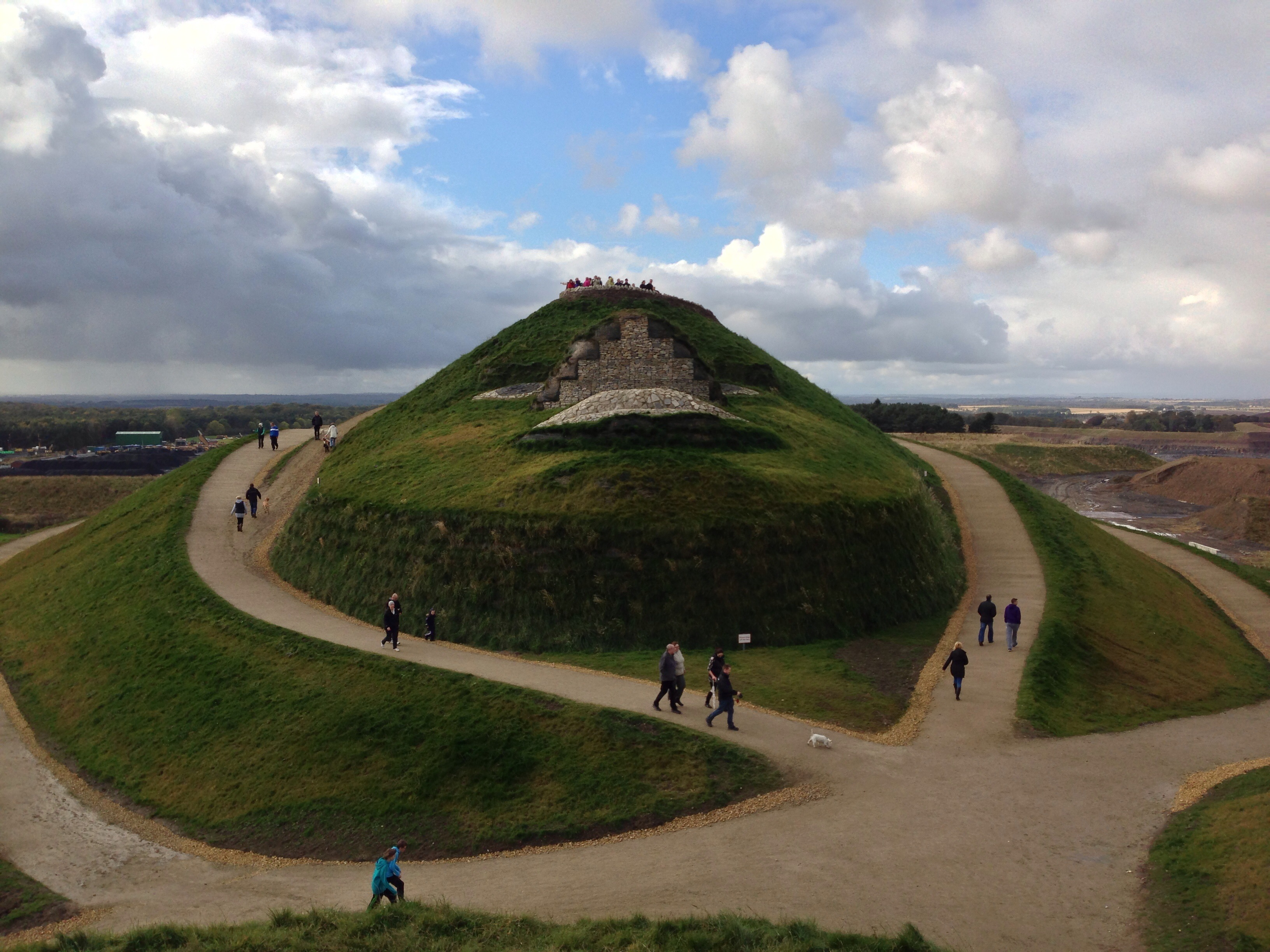
The head pictured from below showing lips, nostrils, eyes and forehead

Northumberlandia (the "Lady of the North") is a huge land art sculpture in the shape of a reclining female figure, which was completed in 2012, near Cramlington, Northumberland, northern England. It is in the care of Northumberland Wildlife Trust.

Made of 1.5 million tonnes of overburden from the neighbouring Shotton Surface Mine, it is 34 metres (112 feet) high and 400 metres (1,300 feet) long, set in a 19 hectares (47 acres) public park. Its creators claim that it is the largest land sculpture in female form in the world.

When constructed, it was intended to be a major tourist attraction, with the developers hoping that it would attract an additional 200,000 visitors a year to Northumberland. It was officially opened by Anne, Princess Royal on 29 August 2012. A day-long Community Opening Event on 20 October 2012 marked the park becoming fully open to the public.

== Development ==
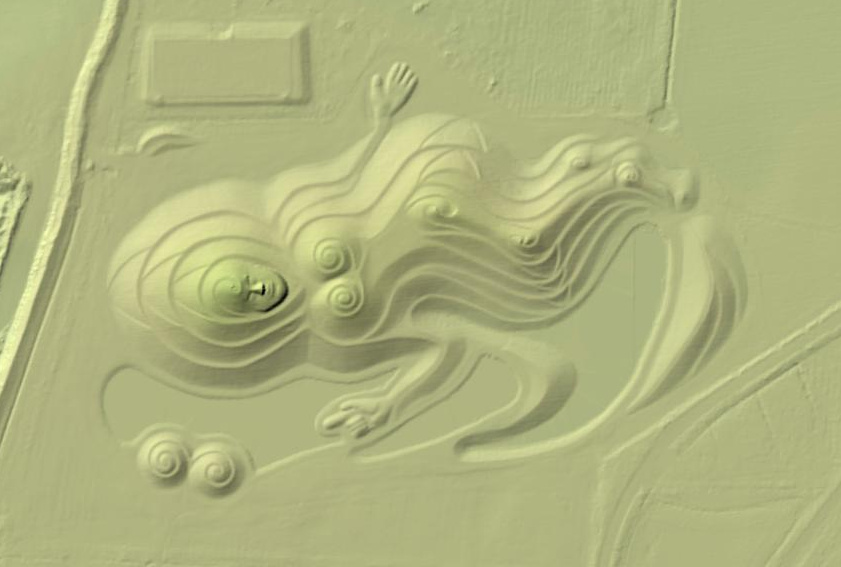
Relief map of Northumberlandia

A map of Northumberlandia

Designed by American landscape architect Charles Jencks, the sculpture was built on the Blagdon Estate, owned by Matt Ridley, a journalist, businessman and author of The Red Queen: Sex and the Evolution of Human Nature.

The £2.5 million cost was borne by the Blagdon Estate and the Banks Group, who carried out the construction work. The construction is part of the development of an adjacent open-cast coal mine at Shotton. For this project, it was decided to use part of the excavated material to make a land sculpture rather than return it all to the surface mine, as is normally done at the end of such operations.

== Condition ==
In April 2023, Northumberland Wildlife Trust reported that the work was suffering excessive wear, due to visitors failing to stay on the designated paths. Extra signage is planned to discourage this, as well as repairs which, the Trust said, "will take years to complete".

== See also ==
- Sleeping Lady
