= Matt Ridley =

British journalist and businessman (born 1958)

The Right Honourable The Viscount Ridley DL FRSL FMedSci
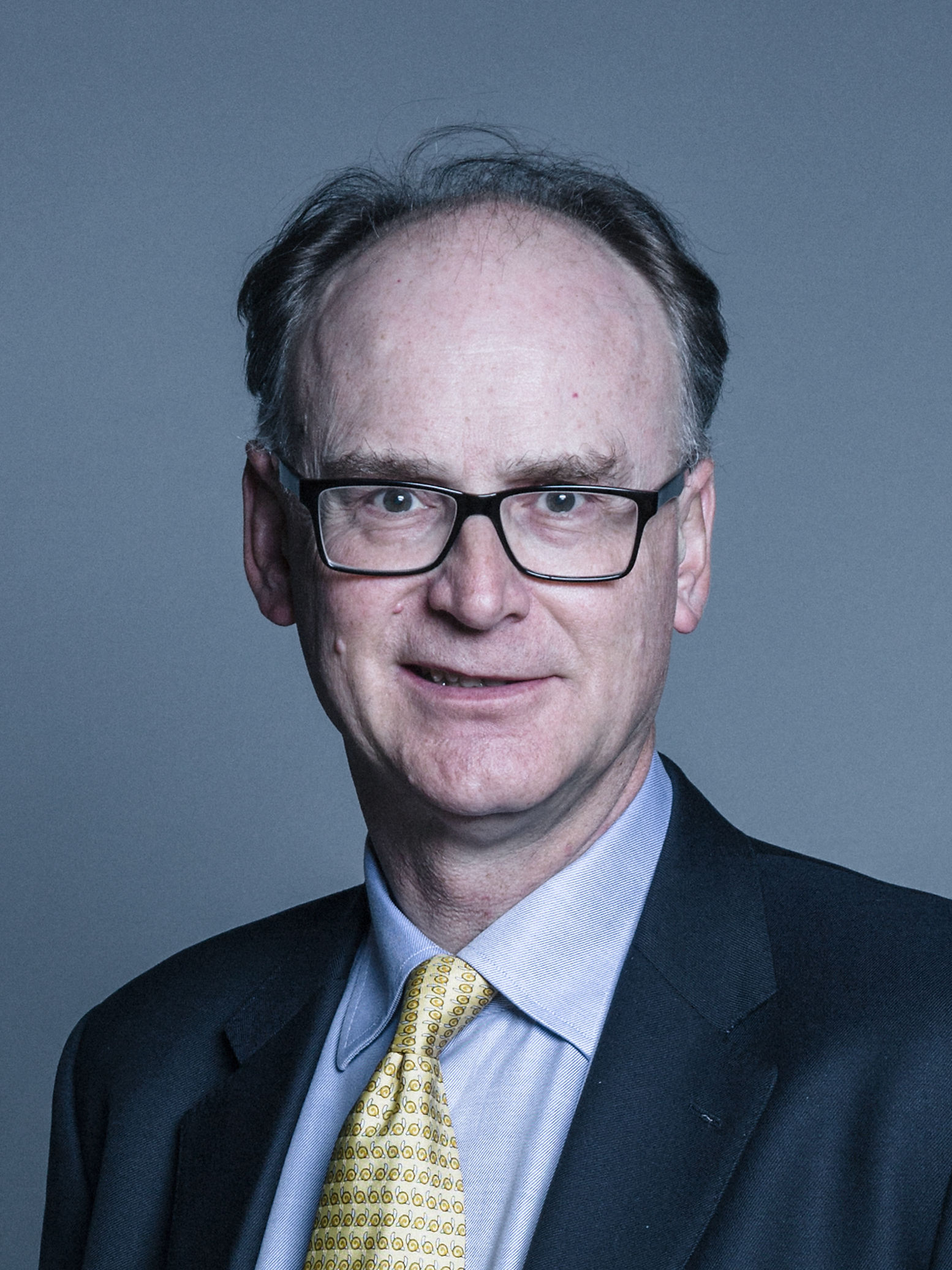
- Ridley in 2018

Member of the House of Lords
- Lord Temporal
- Elected Hereditary Peer; 8 February 2013 – 17 December 2021
- By-election: 2013
- Preceded by: The 13th Earl Ferrers
- Succeeded by: The 3rd Baron Strathcarron

Chairman of Northern Rock
- In office April 2004 – October 2007
- Preceded by: Sir John Riddell
- Succeeded by: Bryan Sanderson

Personal details
- Born: Matthew White Ridley; 7 February 1958 (age 68) Northumberland, England
- Party: Conservative
- Spouse: Anya Hurlbert (m. 1989)
- Children: 2
- Parents: Matthew White Ridley, 4th Viscount Ridley; Lady Anne Katharine Gabrielle Lumley
- Relatives: Rose Paterson (sister)
- Education: Eton College; University of Oxford (BA, DPhil)
- Occupation: Journalist, businessman, politician
- Known for: Northern Rock; The Red Queen: Sex and the Evolution of Human Nature (1994); Genome: The Autobiography of a Species in 23 Chapters (1999); The Rational Optimist: How Prosperity Evolves (2010); Northumberlandia
- Awards: Deputy Lieutenant of Northumberland (2007); Fellow of the Royal Society of Literature (1999); Fellow of the Academy of Medical Sciences (2004)
- Employer: The Economist; Centre for Life; Northern Rock
- Other titles: 9th Baronet (of Blagdon)
- Website: mattridley.co.uk
- Scientific career
- Thesis: Mating system of the pheasant (Phasianus colchicus) (1983)
- Doctoral advisor: Chris Perrins

Matthew White Ridley, 5th Viscount Ridley (born 7 February 1958), commonly known as Matt Ridley, is a British science writer, journalist and businessman. He writes on science, the environment and economics, and has been a regular contributor to The Times newspaper. Ridley was chairman of the UK bank Northern Rock from 2004 to 2007, during which period it experienced the first run on a British bank in 130 years. He resigned, and the bank was bailed out by the UK government; this led to its nationalisation.

Ridley is a libertarian, and a supporter of Brexit. He inherited the viscountcy in February 2012 and was a Conservative hereditary peer from February 2013, with an elected seat in the House of Lords, until his retirement in December 2021.

== Early life and education ==
Ridley's parents were Matthew White Ridley, 4th Viscount Ridley (1925–2012), and Lady Anne Katharine Gabrielle Lumley (1928–2006), the daughter of Roger Lumley, 11th Earl of Scarbrough. He is the nephew of the late Conservative Member of Parliament (MP) and minister Nicholas Ridley and the great grandson of Edwin Lutyens.

Ridley attended Eton College from 1970 to 1975, and then studied at Magdalen College, Oxford, earning a BA degree with first class honours in zoology. He then pursued doctoral research on the mating system of the common pheasant (Phasianus colchicus), supervised by Chris Perrins, and was awarded a DPhil in zoology in 1983.

== Career ==
=== Journalism ===
Ridley joined The Economist in 1984, first working as a science editor until 1987, then as Washington, D.C., correspondent from 1987 to 1989 and as American editor from 1990 to 1992. He was a columnist for The Daily Telegraph and The Sunday Telegraph and an editor of The Best American Science Writing 2002.

From 2010 to 2013, Ridley wrote the weekly "Mind and Matter" column for The Wall Street Journal, which "explores the science of human nature and its implications".

Since 2013, Ridley has written a weekly column for The Times on science, the environment, and economics.

Ridley wrote the majority of the main article of the August 2017 edition of BBC Focus magazine. The article explains his scepticism regarding resource depletion, challenging the widespread belief that resource depletion is an important issue. He cites various previous resource scares as his evidence.

=== Northern Rock, 1994–2007 ===
In 1994, Ridley became a board member of the UK bank Northern Rock. His father had been a board member for 30 years, and chairman from 1987 to 1992. Ridley became chairman in 2004.

In September 2007, Northern Rock became the first British bank since 1878 to suffer a run on its finances, at the start of the 2008 financial crisis. The bank applied to the Bank of England for emergency liquidity funding at the beginning of the crisis, but failed, and Northern Rock was nationalised. Ridley resigned as chairman in October 2007. A parliamentary committee criticised him for not recognising the risks of the bank's financial strategy and "harming the reputation of the British banking industry".

=== Business ===
From 1996 to 2003, Ridley served as founding chairman of the International Centre for Life, which opened in 2000 as a non-profit science centre in Newcastle upon Tyne; and is now its honorary life president. From July 2000 to June 2008, he was a non-executive director of PA Holdings Limited, with Victor Halberstadt.

Until 2010, he was a governor of the Ditchley Foundation, which organises conferences to further education and understanding of Britons and North Americans. He participated in a February 2000 Ditchley conference.

Ridley serves on the Executive Advisory Board of the World.Minds Foundation.

== Patronage ==
The Banks Group and Blagdon estate developed and sponsored the construction of Northumberlandia, or the Lady of the North, a land sculpture in the shape of a reclining female figure, which was part-commissioned and sponsored by Ridley. Now run by a charity group called the Land Trust, it is the largest landform in the world depicting the human form, and, through private funding, cost £3m to build. Attracting over 100,000 people per year, the Northumberland art project, tourism and cultural landmark has won a global landscape architecture award, and has been named 'Miss World'.

The Royal Agricultural Society of England awarded the Bledisloe Gold Medal in 2015 to Ridley for the work done on his Blagdon estate, saying that it "wanted to highlight the extensive environmental improvement work that has been undertaken across the land".

== Political and scientific views ==
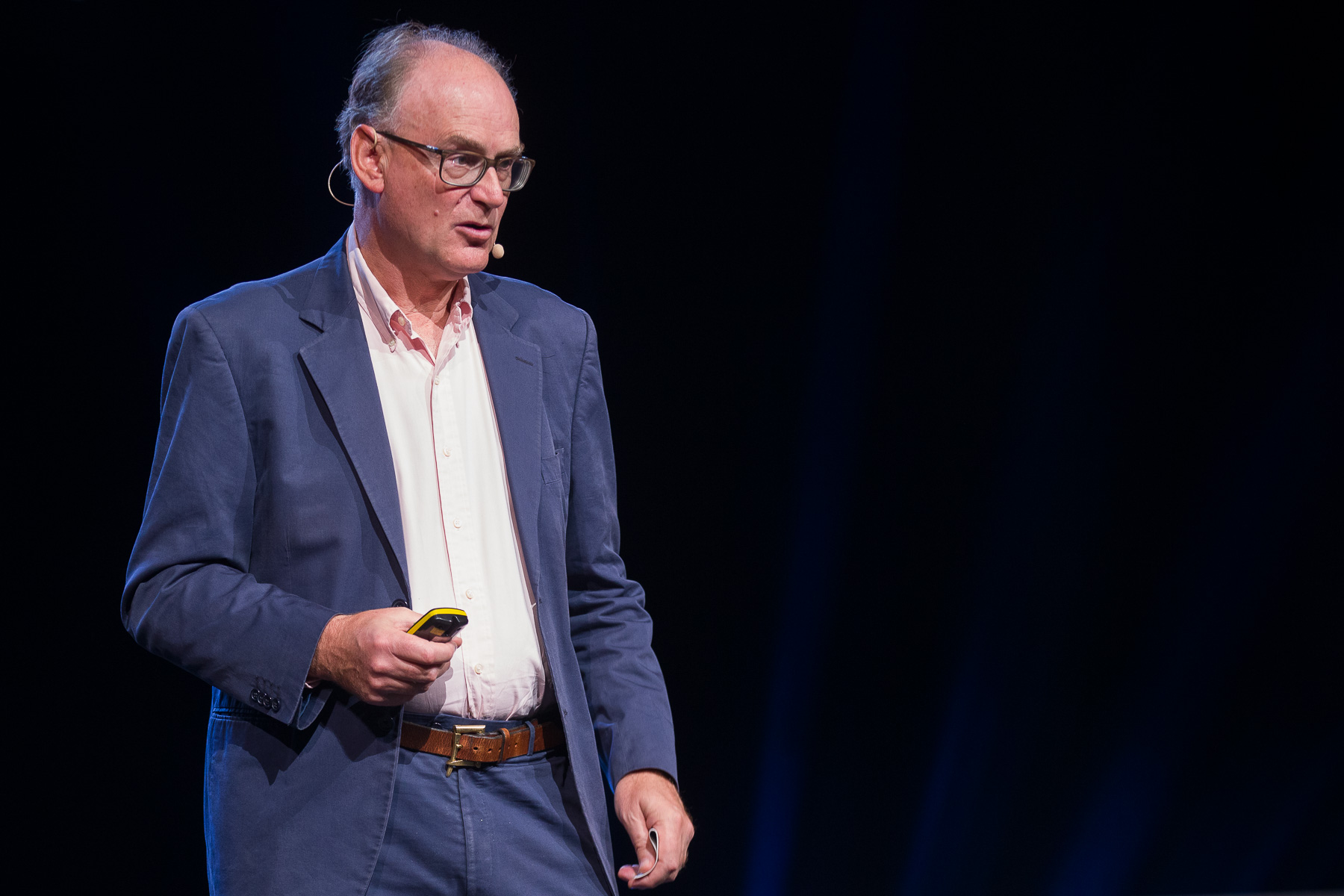
Ridley in 2021

=== Role of government regulation ===
In a 2006 edition of the online magazine Edge – the third culture, Ridley wrote a response to the question "What's your dangerous idea?" which was entitled "Government is the problem not the solution", in which he describes his attitude to government regulation: "In every age and at every time there have been people who say we need more regulation, more government. Sometimes, they say we need it to protect exchange from corruption, to set the standards and police the rules, in which case they have a point, though often they exaggerate it ... The dangerous idea we all need to learn is that the more we limit the growth of government, the better off we will all be."

In 2007, the environmentalist George Monbiot wrote an article in The Guardian connecting Ridley's libertarian economic philosophy and the £27 billion failure of Northern Rock. On 1 June 2010 Monbiot followed up his previous article in the context of Matt Ridley's book The Rational Optimist, which had just been published. Monbiot took the view that Ridley had failed to learn from the collapse of Northern Rock.

Ridley has responded to Monbiot on his website, stating, "George Monbiot's recent attack on me in the Guardian is misleading. I do not hate the state. In fact, my views are much more balanced than Monbiot's selective quotations imply." On 19 June 2010, Monbiot countered with another article on the Guardian website, further questioning Ridley's claims and his response. Ridley was then defended by Terence Kealey in a further article published on the Guardian website.

In November 2010, The Wall Street Journal published a lengthy exchange between Ridley and the Microsoft founder Bill Gates on topics discussed in Ridley's book The Rational Optimist. Gates said that "What Mr. Ridley fails to see is that worrying about the worst case—being pessimistic, to a degree—can actually help to drive a solution"; Ridley said "I am certainly not saying, 'Don't worry, be happy.' Rather, I'm saying, 'Don't despair, be ambitious.'"

Ridley summarised his own views on his political philosophy during the 2011 Hayek Lecture: "[T]hat the individual is not – and had not been for 120,000 years – able to support his lifestyle; that the key feature of trade is that it enables us to work for each other not just for ourselves; that there is nothing so anti-social (or impoverishing) as the pursuit of self sufficiency; and that authoritarian, top-down rule is not the source of order or progress."

In an email exchange, Ridley responded to the environmental activist Mark Lynas's repeated charges of a right-wing agenda with the following reply:

On the topic of labels, you repeatedly call me a member of "the right". Again, on what grounds? I am not a reactionary in the sense of not wanting social change: I make this abundantly clear throughout my book. I am not a hierarchy lover in the sense of trusting the central authority of the state: quite the opposite. I am not a conservative who defends large monopolies, public or private: I celebrate the way competition causes creative destruction that benefits the consumer against the interest of entrenched producers. I do not preach what the rich want to hear—the rich want to hear the gospel of Monbiot, that technological change is bad, that the hoi polloi should stop clogging up airports, that expensive home-grown organic food is the way to go, that big business and big civil service should be in charge. So in what sense am I on the right? I am a social and economic liberal: I believe that economic liberty leads to greater opportunities for the poor to become less poor, which is why I am in favour of it. Market liberalism and social liberalism go hand in hand in my view.

Ridley argues that the capacity of humans for change and social progress is underestimated, and denies what he sees as overly pessimistic views of global climate change and Western birthrate decline.

=== Climate change ===
In 2014, the Wall Street Journal op-ed written by Ridley, "Whatever Happened to Global Warming?" suggesting that climate scientists' explanations were implausible, was challenged by Jeffrey Sachs of Columbia University's Earth Institute. Sachs termed "absurd" Ridley's characterization of a paper in Science magazine by the two scientists Xianyao Chen and Ka-Kit Tung. Sachs challenged Ridley's contentions, and claimed that the "paper's conclusions are the very opposite of Ridley's". Ridley replied that "it is ludicrous, nasty and false to accuse me of lying or 'totally misrepresenting the science'. I have asked Mr. Sachs to withdraw the charges more than once now on Twitter. He has refused to do so".

Friends of the Earth has suggested that Ridley's opposition to climate science is connected to his ties to the coal industry. He is the owner of land in the north-east of England on which the Shotton Surface coal mine operates, and receives payments for the mine. In 2016, he was accused of lobbying for the coal industry, based on an email he had authored to the UK government's energy minister describing a Texas-based company that planned to sequester carbon into materials useful for industrial chemical manufacturing. The complaint was summarily dismissed by the House of Lords Commissioner for Standards.

=== Shale gas and fracking ===
Ridley advocates for the economic significance of shale gas. He is a proponent of fracking. In 2015, he was found to have breached the Parliamentary Code of Conduct by the House of Lords Commissioner for Standards for not orally disclosing in debates on the subject personal interests worth at least £50,000 in Weir Group, which has been described as "the world's largest provider of special equipment used in the process" of fracking.

=== Euroscepticism ===
Ridley is a Eurosceptic and advocated the withdrawal (Brexit) of the UK from the European Union during the 2016 United Kingdom European Union membership referendum. He appeared in Brexit: The Movie, arguing for Britain to return to the policy of free trade that distinguished it after 1845 until the 1930s.

=== Free-market anticapitalism ===
Ridley wrote a 2017 column making the case for free-market anticapitalism. He makes the case that it is misleading to refer to 'capitalism' and 'markets' as the same thing because "commerce, enterprise and markets are – to me – the very opposite of corporatism and even of 'capitalism', if by that word you mean capital-intensive organisations with monopolistic ambitions. Markets and innovation are the creative-destructive forces that undermine, challenge and reshape corporations and public bureaucracies on behalf of consumers. So big business is just as much the enemy as big government, and big business in hock to big government is sometimes the worst of all."

=== COVID-19 ===
Ridley wrote in May 2020 that "research into the origins of the new coronavirus raises questions about how it became so infectious in human beings" and included as one possibility "perhaps laboratories". His 2021 book Viral: The Search for the Origin of COVID-19, written with Alina Chan ascribes the most likely proximate origin of the virus to the COVID-19 lab leak theory. The book received mixed reviews.

== Personal life ==
When his father died in 2012, Ridley succeeded him as the 5th Viscount Ridley, having taken over the running of the family estate of Blagdon Hall, near Stannington, Northumberland, some years before.

In 1989, Ridley married Anya Hurlbert, a Professor of Neuroscience at Newcastle University; they live in northern England and have a son and a daughter.

In 1980, his sister Rose married the British Conservative Party politician Owen Paterson, who held the posts of Secretary of State for Northern Ireland and Secretary of State for Environment, Food and Rural Affairs until July 2014. During this time Ridley was described as 'in many ways Paterson's personal think tank'.

In 2015, Ridley's team won the celebrity Christmas special of University Challenge representing Magdalen College, Oxford, the year after the team of his son, also Matthew, had won the student version representing Trinity College, Cambridge.

== Honours, awards and titles ==
In 1996, he was a visiting professor at Cold Spring Harbor Laboratory in New York, and in 2006 was awarded an honorary DSc degree.

In 2003, he received an honorary DSc degree from Buckingham University and in 2007, an honorary DCL degree from Newcastle University.

He was elected a Fellow of the Royal Society of Literature (FRSL) in 1999. In 2004, he was elected a Fellow of the Academy of Medical Sciences (FMedSci) for "major contributions to public engagement with the biological sciences".

In 2011, the Manhattan Institute awarded Ridley its $50,000 Hayek Prize for his book The Rational Optimist. In his acceptance speech, Ridley said: "As Hayek understood, it is human collaboration that is necessary for society to work... the key feature of trade is that it enables us to work for each other not just for ourselves; that attempts at self-sufficiency are the true form of selfishness as well as the quick road to poverty; and that authoritarian, top-down rule is not the source of order or progress." In 2011, Ridley gave the Angus Millar Lecture on "scientific heresy" at the Royal Society of Arts (RSA).

In 2012, on the death of his father, Ridley became the 5th Viscount Ridley and Baron Wensleydale. He is also the 9th Baronet Ridley. In 2013, he was elected as a hereditary peer to membership in the House of Lords, as a member of the Conservative Party.

In 2013, he was elected a member of the American Academy of Arts and Sciences, and won the Julian L. Simon award in March 2012. In 2014, he won the free enterprise award from the Institute of Economic Affairs.

=== Arms ===
As Viscount Ridley, Ridley bears arms blazoned as Gules on a Chevron Argent between three Falcons proper, as many Pellets.

== Publications ==
Ridley has written a number of popular science books, listed below.

- The Red Queen: Sex and the Evolution of Human Nature, 1993. In Lewis Carroll's Through the Looking-Glass, Alice meets the Red Queen who stays in the same place no matter how fast she runs. This book champions a Red Queen theory for the evolution of sexual reproduction: that it evolved so that the resultant genetic variation would thwart constantly mutating parasites.
- The Origins of Virtue: Human Instincts and the Evolution of Cooperation, 1996
- Genome: The Autobiography of a Species in 23 Chapters, 1999. This book examines one newly discovered gene from each of the 23 human chromosomes. It was shortlisted for the Samuel Johnson Prize in 2000.
- Nature via Nurture: Genes, Experience, & What Makes Us Human, 2003 (also later released under the title The Agile Gene: How Nature Turns on Nurture in 2004). This book discusses reasons why humans can be considered to be simultaneously free-willed and motivated by instinct and culture.
- The Agile Gene: How Nature Turns on Nurture, 2004
- Francis Crick: Discoverer of the Genetic Code, 2006. Ridley's biography of Francis Crick won the Davis Prize for the history of science from the US History of Science Society.
- The Rational Optimist: How Prosperity Evolves, 2010. The Rational Optimist primarily focuses on the benefits of the innate human tendency to trade goods and services. Ridley argues that this trait is the source of human prosperity, and that as people increasingly specialize in their skill sets, we will have increased trade and even more prosperity. It was shortlisted for the 2011 BBC Samuel Johnson Prize.
- The Evolution of Everything: How Ideas Emerge, 2015. In The Evolution of Everything, Ridley "makes the case for evolution, rather than design, as the force that has shaped much of culture, technology and society, and that even now is shaping our future." He argues that "Change in technology, language, mortality and society is incremental, inexorable, gradual and spontaneous...Much of the human world is the result of human action, but not of human design; it emerges from the interactions of millions, not from the plans of a few." The science writer Peter Forbes, writing in The Independent, describes the book as "Ridley's magnum opus, ... decades in the making." Forbes states that Ridley was inspired by the Roman poet Lucretius's long work on "atheistical atomism", De rerum natura, whose "arguments seem uncannily modern: like those of a Richard Dawkins 2000 years avant la lettre." Forbes found the chapter on technology to be "utterly convincing", the most satisfying in the book. But he finds the "sustained polemic on behalf of libertarian anti-State ideas not a million miles from those of the US Republican Tea Party." Forbes calls Ridley "a heretic on most counts", stating that the book has many excesses. All the same, he considers the book necessary reading.
- How Innovation Works: And Why It Flourishes in Freedom, 2020. This book argues that innovation is a disorganized, bottom-up process that emerges through the aggregate work of many low-level individuals, rather than the work of solitary geniuses at the top. Moreover, innovation is poorly understood by economists, and it is often impeded by politicians. He says that the striking thing about innovation is that how mysterious it still is. And he tries to solve this puzzle by a little abstract theorizing, sometimes by argument, but mainly by telling stories. Ridley builds his argument through vivid historical narratives, tracing incremental breakthroughs in innovations ranging from the steam engine and electric light bulb to jet propulsion, vaccines, search engines, and emerging fields such as gene editing and synthetic biology.
- Viral: The Search for the Origin of COVID-19. Written jointly with Alina Chan, it was published in November 2021.
- Birds, Sex and Beauty: The Extraordinary Implications of Charles Darwin's Strangest Idea, 2025

Ridley's first book was Warts and All: The Men Who Would Be Bush (1989), which chronicled the evolution of George H. W. Bush's public image during the 1988 United States presidential election. Ridley has since described his first book as "bad" and has expressed gratitude that few people know about it. He no longer promotes the book on his personal website.

In 2006, Ridley contributed a chapter to Richard Dawkins: How a Scientist Changed the Way We Think, a collection of essays in honour of his friend Richard Dawkins.

Ridley's 2010 TED conference talk, "When Ideas Have Sex", received over 1.7 million views. Ridley argues that exchange and specialisation are the features of human society that lead to the development of new ideas, and that human society is therefore a "collective brain".

Peerage of the United Kingdom
Preceded by Matthew White Ridley	Viscount Ridley; 2012–present	Incumbent; Heir apparent: Hon. Matthew White Ridley
Baronetage of the United Kingdom
Preceded by Matthew White Ridley	White baronets of Blagdon; 2012–present	Incumbent; Heir apparent: Hon. Matthew White Ridley
Parliament of the United Kingdom
Preceded by The Earl Ferrers	Elected hereditary peer to the House of Lords under the House of Lords Act 1999; 2013–2021	Succeeded by The Lord Strathcarron
