= Lars Mathias Blank =

German researcher

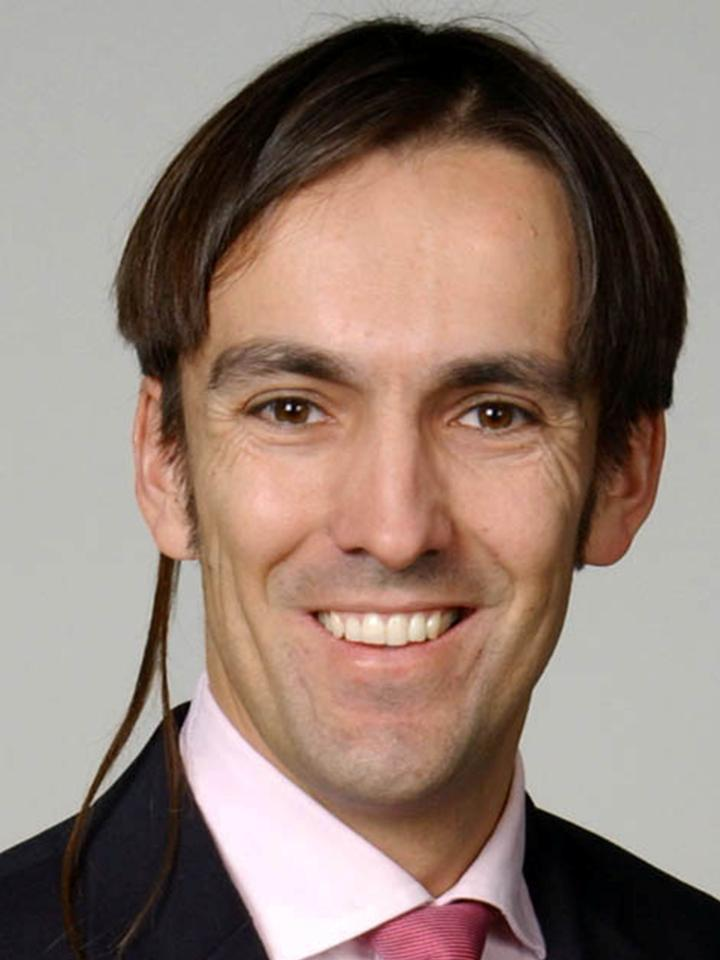

Lars Mathias Blank, (born 27 November 1969 in Hilden, Germany) is a German engineer, biologist, and professor at RWTH Aachen University, and head of its Institute of Applied Microbiology.

== Career ==
Blank studied Chemical Engineering from 1990 to 1997 at the TU Dortmund University and Biology from 1992 to 1997 at the Ruhr University of Bochum (Germany). For his master's, he worked in Metabolic Engineering in the group of E. T. Papoutsakis at Northwestern University in Illinois, USA, and in yeast cell biology in the group of Prof. W.-H. Kunau at Ruhr University Bochum. For his Ph.D., he worked for Prof. L. K. Nielsen at the Biotech Centre of the University of Queensland, Australia (1998 to 2002), where he developed a continuous process for hyaluronic acid production using lactic acid bacteria. During his Ph.D., he worked as a visiting scientist at the Technical University of Denmark (DTU) in Lyngby, Denmark, from September to December 1999. From November 2004 until June 2011, Blank led the group 'Systems Biotechnology' at the Laboratory of Chemical Biotechnology of Prof. A. Schmid at the TU Dortmund University and was a senior research fellow at the Leibniz Institute of Analytical Sciences (ISAS) in Dortmund. In January 2010, he finalized his Habilitation. In July 2011, Blank became professor, chair of Applied Microbiology, and head of the Institute of Applied Microbiology (iAMB) at RWTH Aachen University. Blank coordinated the EU project ‘P4SB – From plastic waste to plastic value using Pseudomonas putida Synthetic Biology‘ and was the coordinator of the Horizon 2020 EU project ‘MIX-UP – Mixed plastics biodegradation and upcycling using microbial communities‘. He is partner of the Werner Siemens Foundation (WSS) century project 'catalaix', researching open loop plastic recycling.

== Research ==
In his research, Blank focuses on fundamental and applied aspects of microbial metabolism. Of specific interest is the interaction between the metabolic network and the introduced genetic and environmental perturbations. Research on in silico/in vivo metabolic network operation aims to deepen understanding of cell function, with the ultimate goal of rational cell engineering. He is associate editor of renowned international journals such as Engineering in Life Sciences, Microbial Biotechnology, Fungal Biology and Biotechnology, Journal of Bioscience and Bioengineering, Metabolic Engineering, and Metabolic Engineering Communication.

== Awards & Fellowships ==
- Elected board member of the IMES - International Metabolic Engineering Society (since 2023)
- 'FAMOS for Family’ award of the RWTH Aachen University, Germany (2018)
- 1st prize in the category ‘transfer’ and runner up in the category ‘life sciences’ of the competition ‘NRW Inventing the Future’ of PROvendis – R. Wichmann, T. Tiso, B. Küppers, F. Rosenau, A. Wittgens, and L. M. Blank, Dortmund, Germany – 10,000€ (2014)
- Senior lecturer (2007) and guest professor of Systems Biotechnology at the TU Graz, Austria (since 2012)
- Postdoctoral fellow of the Deutsche Akademie der Naturforscher Leopoldina (Halle, Germany) at the ETH Zurich, Switzerland (2002–2004)
- Scholarship for tuition fees of the Chemical Engineering Department and living expenses of the University of Queensland, Australia (1998–2002)
- Martin Schmeisser Scholarship of the TU Dortmund University (1997)

== Publications ==
A full list of his publications is available online.

- Wittgens A, Tiso T, Arndt TT, Wenk P, Hemmerich J, Müller C, Wichmann R, Küpper B, Zwick M, Wilhelm S, Hausmann R, Syldatk C, Rosenau F, Blank LM. Growth independent rhamnolipid production from glucose using the non-pathogenic Pseudomonas putida KT2440. Microb Cell Fact. 2011;10:80. doi: 10.1186/1475-2859-10-80
- Tiso T, Narancic T, Wei R, Pollet E, Beagan N, Schröder K, Honak A, Jiang M, Kenny ST, Wierckx N, Perrin R, Avérous L, Zimmermann W, O'Connor K, Blank LM. Towards bio-upcycling of polyethylene terephthalate. Metab Eng. 2021;66:167-178. doi:10.1016/j.ymben.2021.03.011
- Bator I, Wittgens A, Rosenau F, Tiso T, Blank LM. Comparison of Three Xylose Pathways in Pseudomonas putida KT2440 for the Synthesis of Valuable Products. Front Bioeng Biotechnol. 2020;7:480. doi: 10.3389/fbioe.2019.00480
- Welsing G, Wolter B, Kleinert GEK, Göttsch F, Besenmatter W, Xue R, Mauri A, Steffens D, Köbbing S, Dong W, Jiang M, Bornscheuer UT, Wei R, Tiso T, Blank LM. Two-step biocatalytic conversion of post-consumer polyethylene terephthalate into value-added products facilitated by genetic and bioprocess engineering. Bioresour Technol. 2025; 417:131837. doi: 10.1016/j.biortech.2024.131837 Erratum in: Bioresour Technol. 2025;428:132453. doi: 10.1016/j.biortech.2025.132453
- Cui J, Fassl M, Vasanthakumaran V, Dierig MM, Hölzl G, Karmainski T, Tiso T, Kubicki S, Thies S, Blank LM, Jaeger KE, Dörmann P. Biosurfactant biosynthesis by Alcanivorax borkumensis and its role in oil biodegradation. Nat Chem Biol. 2025;21(10):1631-1641. doi: 10.1038/s41589-025-01908-1
- Utomo RNC, Li WJ, Tiso T, Eberlein C, Doeker M, Heipieper HJ, Jupke A, Wierckx N, Blank LM. Defined Microbial Mixed Culture for Utilization of Polyurethane Monomers. ACS Sustainable Chem. Eng. 2020;8(47):17466–17474. doi: 10.1021/acssuschemeng.0c06019
- Völker F, Maaß S, Phan ANT, Gibhardt J, Commichau FM, Blank LM. High glutamate demand enables simultaneous consumption of glycerol and citrate despite carbon catabolite repression in engineered Bacillus subtilis strains. Metab Eng. 2025;91:379-388. doi: 10.1016/j.ymben.2025.06.003

Reviews:

- Liebal UW, Phan ANT, Sudhakar M, Raman K, Blank LM. Machine learning applications for mass spectrometry-based metabolomics. Metabolites. 2020;10(6):243. doi: 10.3390/metabo10060243
- Blank LM, Narancic T, Mampel J, Tiso T, O'Connor K. Biotechnological upcycling of plastic waste and other non-conventional feedstocks in a circular economy. Curr Opin Biotechnol. 2020;62:212-219. doi: 10.1016/j.copbio.2019.11.011
- Tiso T, Winter B, Wei R, Hee J, de Witt J, Wierckx N, Quicker P, Bornscheuer UT, Bardow A, Nogales J, Blank LM. The metabolic potential of plastics as biotechnological carbon sources - Review and targets for the future. Metab Eng. 2022;71:77-98. doi: 10.1016/j.ymben.2021.12.006
- Christ JJ, Willbold S, Blank LM. Methods for the Analysis of Polyphosphate in the Life Sciences. Anal Chem. 2020;92(6):4167-4176. doi: 10.1021/acs.analchem.9b05144
- Harings JAW, Ballerstedt H, Blank LM. Recycling-privileged plastic polymers. Curr Opin Green Sustain Chem. 2025;56:101049. doi: 10.1016/j.cogsc.2025.101049
- Mauri A, García Tejada L, Blank LM. Yeast Midas’ touch: recent advances in the valorisation of methanol by yeasts. World J Microbiol Biotechnol. 2025;41:422. doi: 10.1007/s11274-025-04642-x
