= Alina Chan =

Canadian molecular biologist

- Education: University of British Columbia
- Scientific career
- Fields: Molecular biology, cell engineering, gene therapy
- Workplaces: Broad Institute; Harvard Medical School
- Thesis: DNA:RNA hybrid genome-wide profiling and links to genomic instability (2014)

Yujia Alina Chan is a Canadian molecular biologist specializing in gene therapy and cell engineering. She was affiliated with the Broad Institute of MIT and Harvard, where she was a postdoctoral fellow from February 2018 to December 2021, and then a scientific advisor from January 2022 to January 2025. During the COVID-19 pandemic, she became known for supporting the hypothesis that the SARS-CoV-2 virus escaped from a lab, contrary to the prevailing consensus regarding the origins of the virus.

== Biography ==
Chan was born in Vancouver, British Columbia, to Singaporean parents. Her family returned to Singapore shortly after, where she grew up. She returned to Canada after high school to study biochemistry and molecular biology at the University of British Columbia, where she earned a PhD. She then joined Harvard University as a postdoctoral scholar, later joining the Stanley Center for Psychiatric Research at the Broad Institute.

== COVID-19 origins ==
Chan became known during the COVID-19 pandemic for co-authoring a preprint according to which the SARS-CoV-2 virus was "pre-adapted" to humans and suggesting COVID-19 could have escaped from a laboratory. The preprint has not been accepted for publication by a scientific journal, but received a significant reception in the popular press.

Chan signed open letters together with other scientists published in the Wall Street Journal and The New York Times, calling for full and unrestricted international forensic investigations into all possible origins of the virus. She detailed her views on Twitter and wrote opinion pieces on the subject with science journalist Matt Ridley in the Wall Street Journal and in The Daily Telegraph. HarperCollins published their book, Viral: The Search for the Origin of COVID-19, in November 2021. Chan was one of 18 scientists who signed a letter in Science Magazine calling again for a credible investigation into the origins of the virus. The letter called for a "proper investigation" into "both natural and laboratory spillovers" and was widely covered in the press and brought the debate on the possible lab origins of the virus into the mainstream.

The New York Times noted in October 2021 that Chan's view has been "widely disputed by other scientists", but some have commended her willingness to advance alternative hypotheses in the face of controversy. Jonathan Eisen of UC Davis praised Chan for raising the lab-origin discussion, but said her views remain conjecture, as not enough disease outbreaks have been traced in enough molecular detail to know what is normal, noting also that the virus continues to change and adapt. Sixteen months after Chan's preprint was shared online, a scientific review article published in Cell described the pre-adaptation theory as "without validity". In September 2021, Chan participated in a debate on COVID-19 origins organized by Science magazine, which included scientists Linfa Wang, Michael Worobey, and Jesse Bloom. She detailed her position further in the New York Times in June 2024. Critiques of the NYT piece were posted by David Gorski on his blog Science-Based Medicine, and by 41 scientists in the Journal of Virology. In a 2026 New York Times opinion piece, Chan explored the dangers of a future lab leak due to lack of oversight.
