= 1929–1930 psittacosis pandemic =

Pandemic

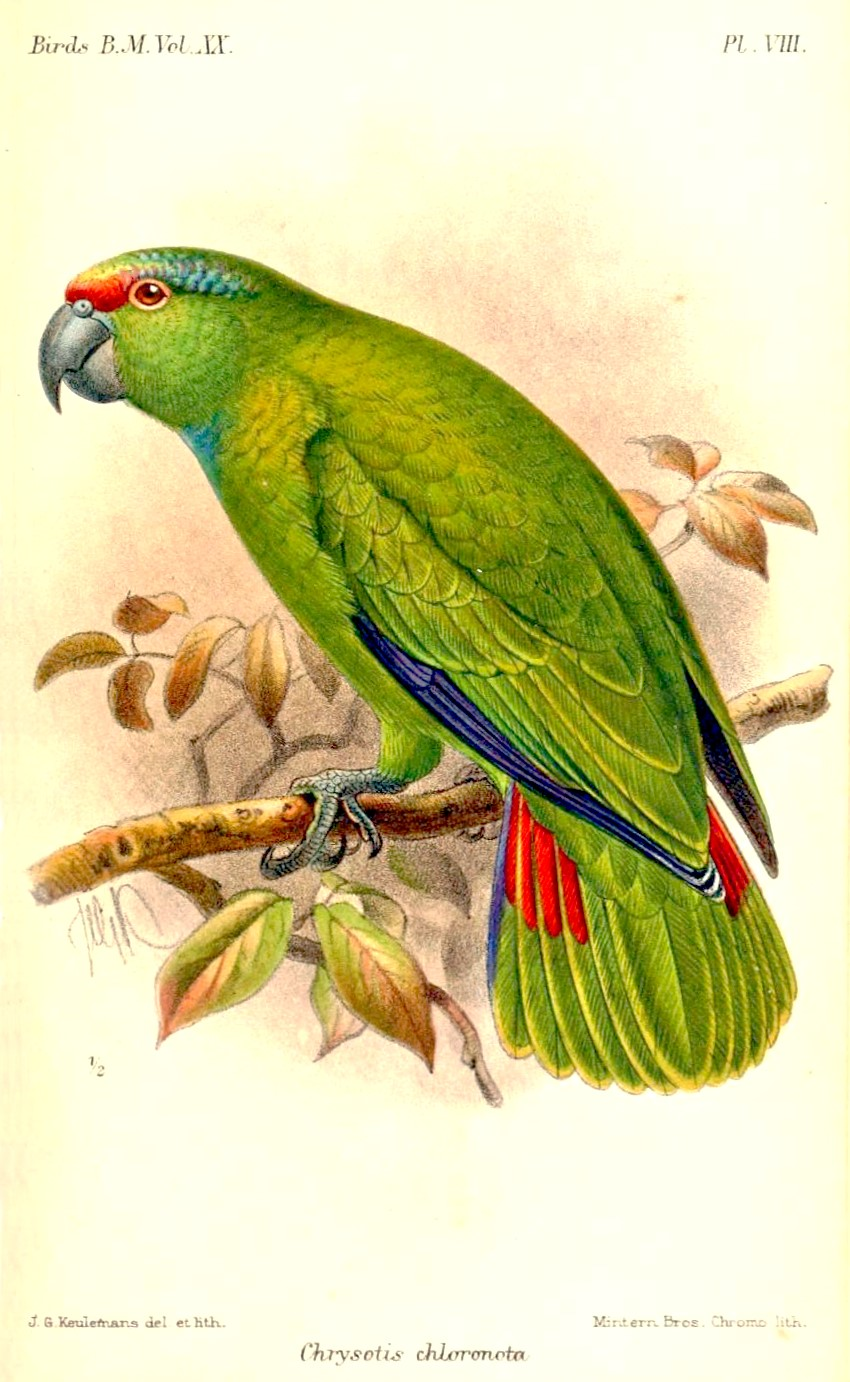
- "Chrysotis chloronota" (Festive Amazon). Catalogue of the Birds in the British Museum, Vol. 20 (1891).
- Disease: Psittacosis
- Source: Amazon parrots; Canary (Serinus canaria); Lovebirds (Agapornis species); Shell parakeets
- Location: Global
- First outbreak: Argentina
- Arrival date: mid-1929
- Type: Zoonotic
- Confirmed cases: 750–800
- Deaths: Greater than 100 worldwide
- Fatality rate: 15%

The 1929–1930 psittacosis pandemic, also known as the psittacosis outbreak of 1929–1930 and the great parrot fever pandemic, was a series of simultaneous outbreaks of psittacosis (parrot fever) which, accelerated by the breeding and transportation of birds in crowded containers for the purpose of trade, was initially seen to have its origin in parrots from South America. It was shortly found to have spread from several species of birds from several countries worldwide to humans between mid 1929 and early 1930. Diagnosed by its clinical features and link to birds, it affected around 750 to 800 people globally, with a mortality of 15%. Its mode of transmission to humans by mouth-to-beak contact or inhaling dried bird secretions and droppings was not known at the time. The cause, Chlamydia psittaci, which usually remains dormant in birds until activated by stress of capture and confinement, was discovered after the pandemic.

Cases of psittacosis were reported in mid 1929, in Birmingham, United Kingdom, and linked to parrots from Buenos Aires, Argentina, where an ongoing outbreak of the disease had led to cautioning bird owners to declare their sick parrots. The origin of the outbreak in the Argentine city of Córdoba was traced to an import of 5,000 parrots from Brazil. Although the Argentine parrot trade was stopped, a number of birds were illegally sold on to visitors at its seaports, with the consequence that psittacosis was transmitted to several countries.

In November 1929, reports of cases among an Argentine theatrical group in Córdoba made it into the local press. In January 1930, when cases of an atypical pneumonia in one family, with the death of their parrot, appeared in Maryland, United States, a link was made to the story of the theatrical group, and "parrot fever" made headlines in the American press. Following further cases, bans on parrot trades were implemented, and subsequently cases were reported in several other countries, including Germany, France and Australia. The origin was understood to have been the importation of green Amazon parrots from South America. Later, the principal source of the disease in the U.S. was domestic lovebirds raised in Californian aviaries.

The impact of the outbreak on the U.S. Hygienic Laboratory, with 16 of its workers affected, including two deaths, led to the formation of the National Institute of Health.

== Background ==
In 1880, (Note: Medical historian Mark Honigsbaum gives this date as 1872.) Swiss physician Jakob Ritter described a cluster of seven people with atypical pneumonia connected to his brother's household in Uster. In that house were 12 finches and parrots confined in the study. Three of the seven affected people died, including Ritter's brother and the metal-worker who visited the home to fix the bird cage. Ritter detailed the natural history of the disease, and, noting its similar features to typhoid and typhus, he called the disease "pneumotyphus" and proposed that the birds might be the vectors. Subsequently, further similar outbreaks with a coincidence of exposure to birds appeared in other parts of Europe, including Paris in the 1890s, where it killed one in three affected people. The outbreaks ended following bans in bird trading. Subsequently, greater efforts were made to find the cause of the disease, but without success. The disease in birds was named psittacosis in 1895 by Antonin Morange. Prior to the 1929 outbreak of psittacosis in the United States, the last known cases were in 1917, found in captive birds in the basement of a department store in Pennsylvania. The causative pathogen, Chlamydia psittaci, was not discovered until the 1960s.

== Origin and global spread ==
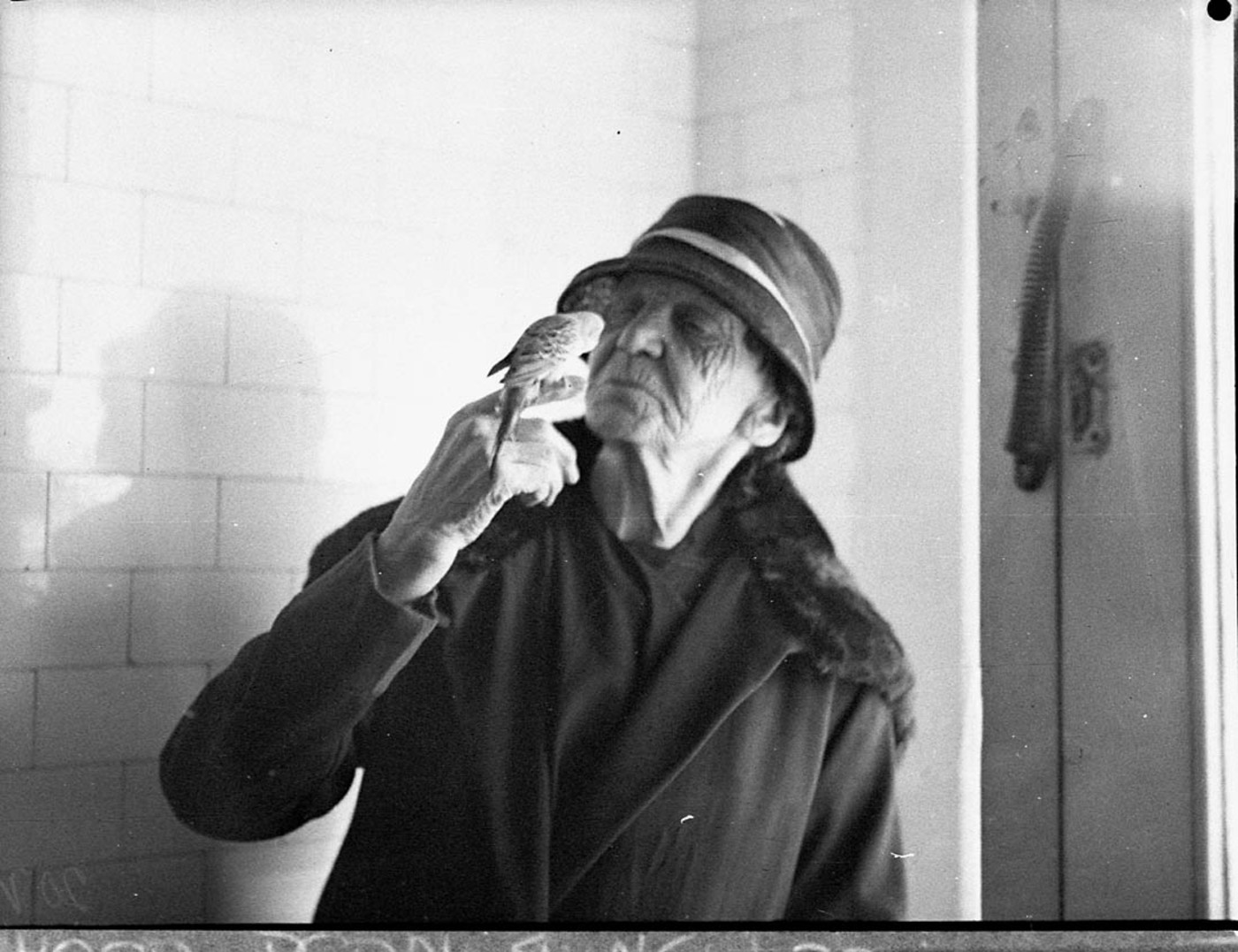
Budgerigar, 1935

There were multiple origins, involving several countries and several species of birds. Affected people typically experienced headache, poor sleep, fatigue and a cough trailing several days of fever. Some subsequently became delirious and semi-conscious, after which some died, and others recovered with a prolonged convalescent period.

Initial outbreaks were linked to exotic birds from South America. The source of the Córdoba outbreak was traced to an import of 5,000 parrots from Brazil. The birds had been confined in unsanitary and crowded containers. Although the Argentine parrot trade was stopped, a number of birds were sold on to visitors to its seaports, and psittacosis, also known as parrot fever, was transmitted to several countries. Its mode of transmission to humans by mouth-to-beak contact or inhaling dried bird secretions and droppings was not known at the time. Germany, the United Kingdom and the United States were the most severely affected with more than 100 cases each. Implicated birds included green Amazon parrots, canaries, lovebirds and shell parakeets.

By early 1930, the disease was reported in humans in several countries around the world, accelerated by the popular hobby of domestic bird-keeping at the time. Many cases and clusters had links with sick parrots. Around 750 to 800 people were affected. The average mortality was 15%, with a total of more than 100 deaths.

The majority of cases in the U.S. were found in 1931 to be linked to endemic psittacosis in California, associated with the increasingly popular trade of breeding lovebirds for sale chiefly to housewives and widows.

== Africa ==
=== Algiers ===
In Algiers, four deaths were attributed to the disease in the week ending 8 February 1930. The following week, three further cases were reported.

== Europe ==
When cases appeared in Amsterdam, Netherlands Health Department asked that steamships that call at South American seaports refuse to take on board parrots.

=== Germany ===
Cases in Germany were reported, with some uncertainty, from July 1929, in Berlin, Hamburg, Liegnitz, Munich, Glauchau and Dôbeln. It resulted in the banning of the importation of parrots. By the end of the pandemic in early 1930, Germany had the largest number of cases, with 215 affected, of which 45 died. Parrot-owners were found abandoning their birds at the Berlin zoo, and in response the zoo closed its gates.

Of 35 parakeets involved in the German cases, 30 had no disease.

=== United Kingdom ===
Cases were reported in Birmingham, United Kingdom, in mid 1929. In December 1929, a ship's carpenter attended the London Hospital with a typhoid-like illness. He had previously purchased two parrots from Buenos Aires, which had died en route to London. By March 1930, 100 suspected cases were reported across the UK. One case was linked to a visit to a pub, where there was noted to be a sick parrot.

Research into the cause was commenced by Samuel Bedson at the London Hospital.

In the UK, the Parrots (Prohibition of Import) Regulations 1930 was created following consideration by the permanent committee of the Office international d'hygiène publique. It prohibited the trade of parrots unless for research.

== North America ==
In 1929, around 500,000 canaries and nearly 50,000 parrots were imported to the United States from Brazil, Argentina, Colombia, Cuba, Trinidad, Salvador, Mexico and Japan. Most birds entered the U.S. via New York, except budgerigars, which entered via San Francisco and Los Angeles.

=== Early January 1930 ===
In early January 1930, an outbreak of "mysterious pneumonias" in the United States came to media attention when cases in three members of one family were traced to the previous Christmas importation of parrots from South America. 10 days before Christmas, Simon Martin, secretary of the Chamber of Commerce in Annapolis, Maryland, bought a parrot in Baltimore for his wife, who subsequently, along with their daughter and son-in-law, became seriously ill. Their new parrot's feathers had become dirty and ruffled by Christmas Eve, and on Christmas Day it died. The wife of the family physician made a link to a newspaper article about "parrot fever" in Buenos Aires. In consequence, Martin's physician sent a telegram to the United States Public Health Service (PHS) in Washington DC, requesting for advice on parrot fever. The story came to the attention of Surgeon General Hugh S. Cumming, who received similar messages from Baltimore, New York, Ohio and California. The task of solving the cause of parrot fever was signposted to George W. McCoy, the director of PHS's Hygienic Laboratory and a renowned bacteriologist who had discovered tularaemia, and his deputy, Charlie Armstrong, neither of whom had ever heard of parrot fever.

On 8 January 1930, The Washington Post reported "parrot disease baffles experts" and headlines of "Parrot Fever Hits Trio at Annapolis". On the same day, the outbreak made headlines in the Los Angeles Times with "two women and man in Annapolis believed to have 'parrot fever'". On 11 January, the same paper reported "Parrot Disease Fatal to Seven", and the Chicago Daily Tribune put on their front page "Baltimore woman dies". By 15 January, 50 cases were reported nationwide. The following day, the Baltimore Sun announced that "Woman's Case Brings Parrot Victims to 19". During this time, one of the first deaths was particularly alarming. The victim was a woman in Toledo, Ohio, who had been given three Cuban parrots by her husband.

Cumming warned to stay away from imported parrots, whilst sailors at sea were ordered by one U.S. Navy admiral to throw overboard their parrots. Some were encouraged by one health commissioner to kill their pet parrots, and some abandoned them on the streets.

Reports soon began to follow from the eastern coast of the U. S., with Baltimore, New York City and Los Angeles, involving other birds such as shell parakeets (Australian budgerigars). The director of the Bureau of Communicable Diseases, Daniel S. Hatfield, ordered the confiscation of all birds at Baltimore pet stores.

=== Late January 1930 ===
Six major pet dealers in the U.S. stood to lose $5 million per year as a result of an executive order issued by President Herbert Hoover on 24 January prohibiting "the immediate importation of parrots into the United States, its possessions and dependencies from any foreign port", until research could find the cause and mode of transmission. This decision came following Armstrong's initial research, which showed that healthy parrots being infected by sick ones and that some could become asymptomatic carriers. The following day, Armstrong's assistant, Henry "Shorty" Anderson, became ill.

=== February 1930 ===
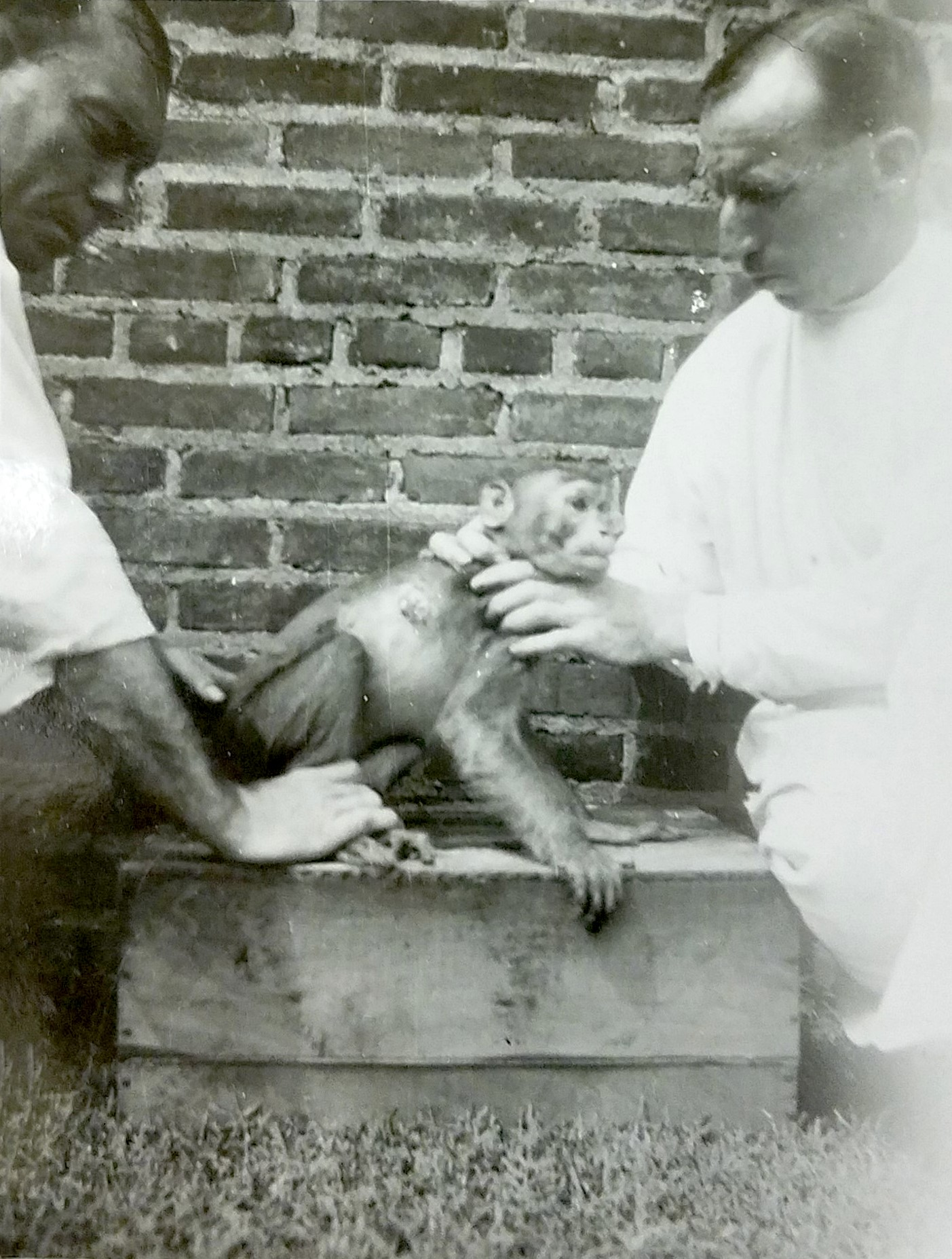
Henry "Shorty" Anderson (right)

Two of the 16 people that developed the illness from exposure at the National Hygiene Laboratory died, including, on 8 February, Anderson. The following day, bacteriologist William Royal Stokes died, only weeks after commencing research on the parrot dropping samples given to him by Armstrong. By this time, Armstrong was ill himself but survived. They had failed to isolate the causative infectious agent, and McCoy was subsequently forced to kill the birds and fumigate the Hygienic Laboratory.

=== Later ===
43 of the 74 foci in the U.S. were traced to contact with Amazon parrots. Links were traced to Japan, Caribbean, Germany, Central America and South America. Between November 1929 and May 1930, the U.S. recorded 169 cases, of which 33 died. New York was the centre of the East Coast bird trade. However, the principal ports of entry for Australian budgerigars was San Francisco and Los Angeles. Later, it was discovered that the main source was domestic lovebirds raised in hundreds of independent Californian aviaries by breeders who were supplementing their incomes following the recent Wall Street Crash. The winter of 1929 was also witnessing an influenza epidemic and there were fears of a recurrence of Spanish flu, which added to the depressive effects. In this context, peddlers travelled door-to-door with "lovebirds" for housewives and widows. As a result, most victims in the U.S. were women. The realisation and connections of the various outbreaks may not have become apparent had it not been for the press. Likewise, the "hysteria" and heightened public concern surrounding the pandemic may not have occurred had it not been for headlines such as "Killed by a Pet Parrot".

The establishment of the National Institutes of Health is directly linked to the outbreak that occurred in Maryland. Its story was retold in Paul de Kruif's, Men Against Death (1933).

== South America ==
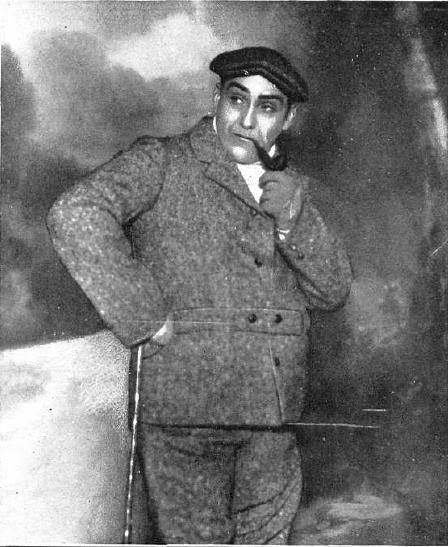
Florencio Parravicini 1913

The first reports of the disease were recorded in July 1929, in Córdoba, Argentina. During the summer and autumn of 1929, Córdoba and Tucumán in Argentina, reported over 100 cases of a severe atypical pneumonia linked to a large shipment of birds from Brazil.

One of the outbreaks occurred among an Argentine theatrical group in October 1929, after they had purchased an Amazon parrot in Buenos Aires. Two of the actors died from the illness. Florencio Parravicini, the main male actor, contracted the disease and according to the Hearst, recovered after suffering significantly for 17 days. Cases in Argentina followed a number of auctions that took place in several cities, with owners selling a number of sick birds as quickly as possible. In response, the Argentine parrot trade was stopped and pet owners were cautioned by authorities to look out for sick birds and report them. However, dishonest traders continued to sell sick birds to visitors to its seaports. The cases were reported in an Argentinian journal in November 1929 and later picked up by sensational American press.

== Countries affected ==
There were no reported cases in Brazil. The disease was reported in:

- Algeria
- Argentina
- Australia
- Austria
- Canada
- Czechoslovakia
- Denmark
- Egypt
- France
- Germany
- Honolulu
- Italy
- Japan
- Mexico
- Netherlands
- Poland
- Spain
- Sweden
- Switzerland
- United Kingdom
- United States

== Birds involved ==
Meyer later demonstrated that psittacosis could be transmitted by around 50 species of birds. Birds implicated in the 1929–30 pandemic included:

- Amazon parrots (Amazona species)
- Canary (Serinus canaria)
- Lovebirds (Agapornis species)
- Shell parakeets (Australian budgerigars, Melopsittacus undulatus)
- Talking parrots
- Grey parrots (Psittacus erithacus)
- Thrushes

=== Gallery ===
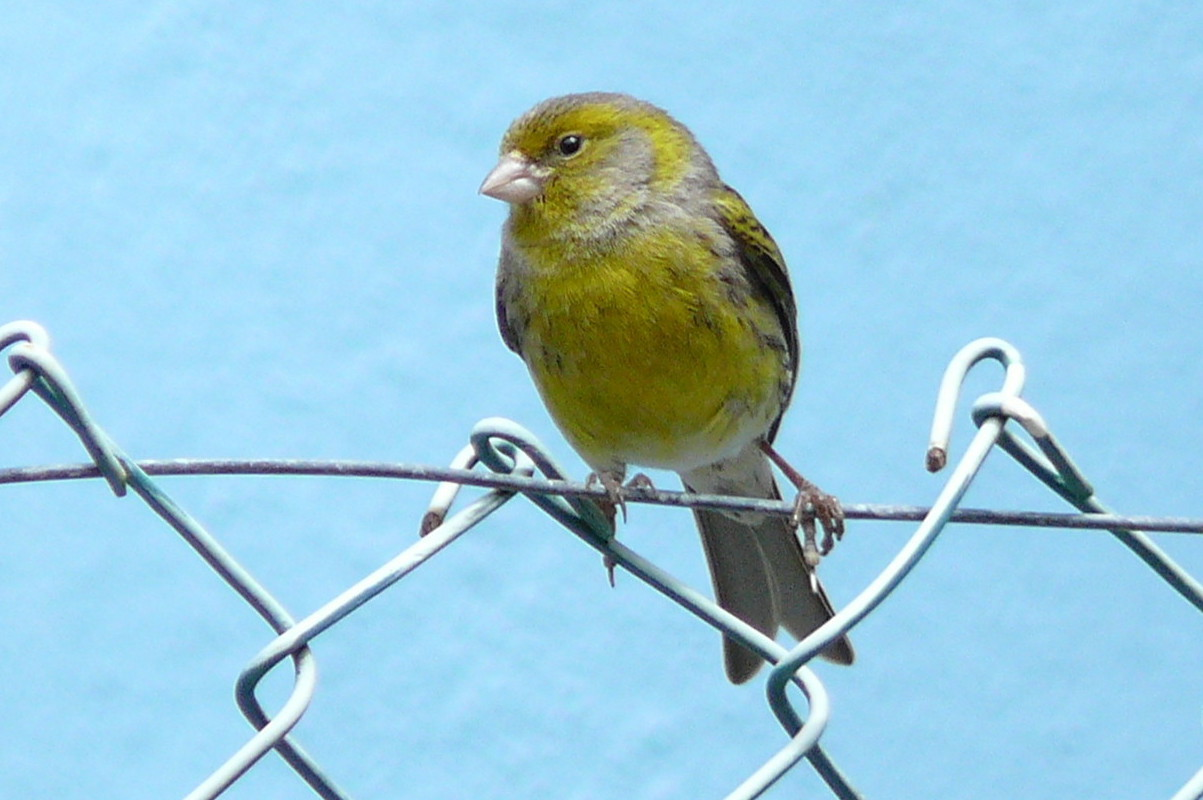
Canary (Serinus canaria)

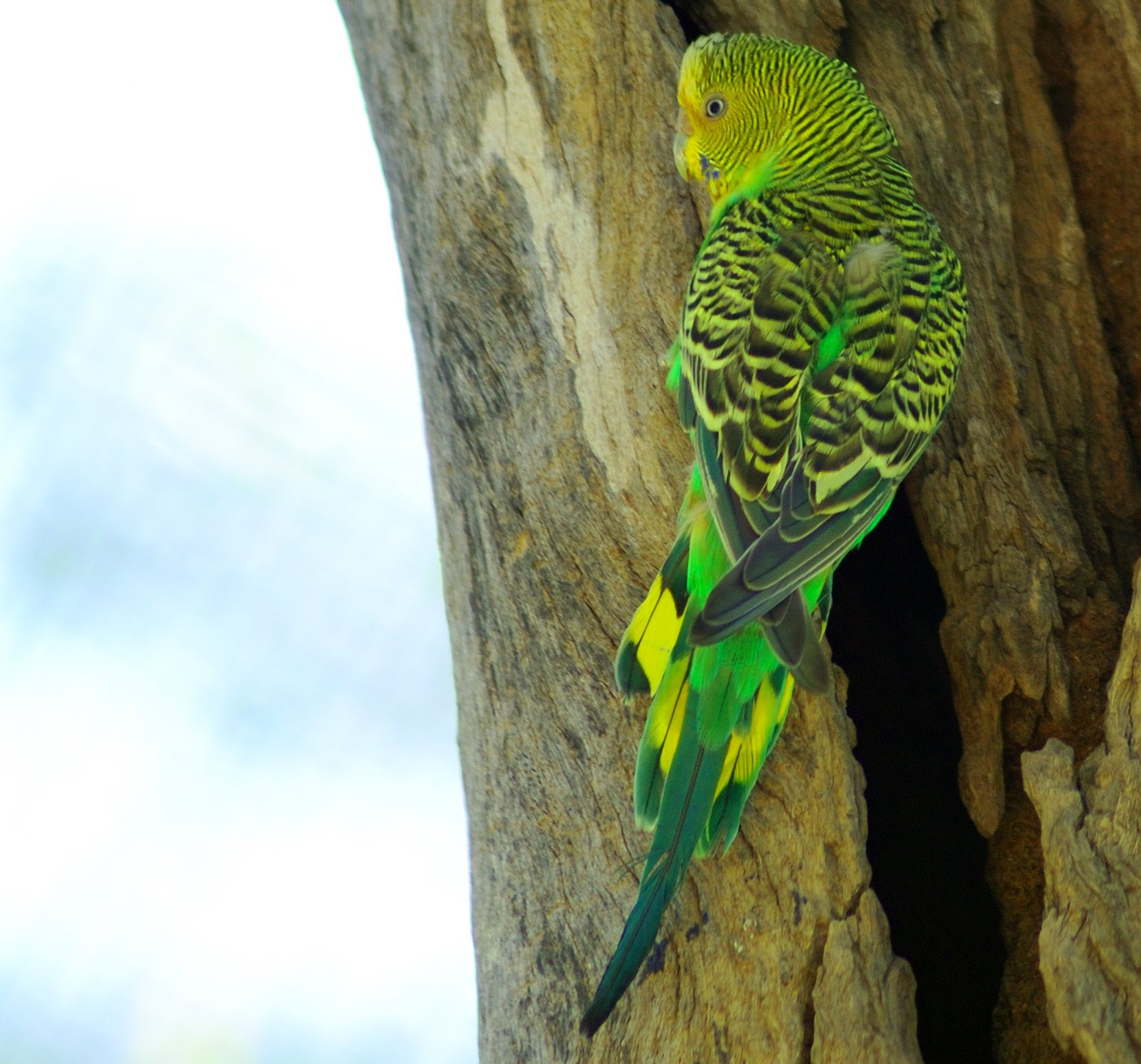
Budgerigar (Melopsittacus undulatus)

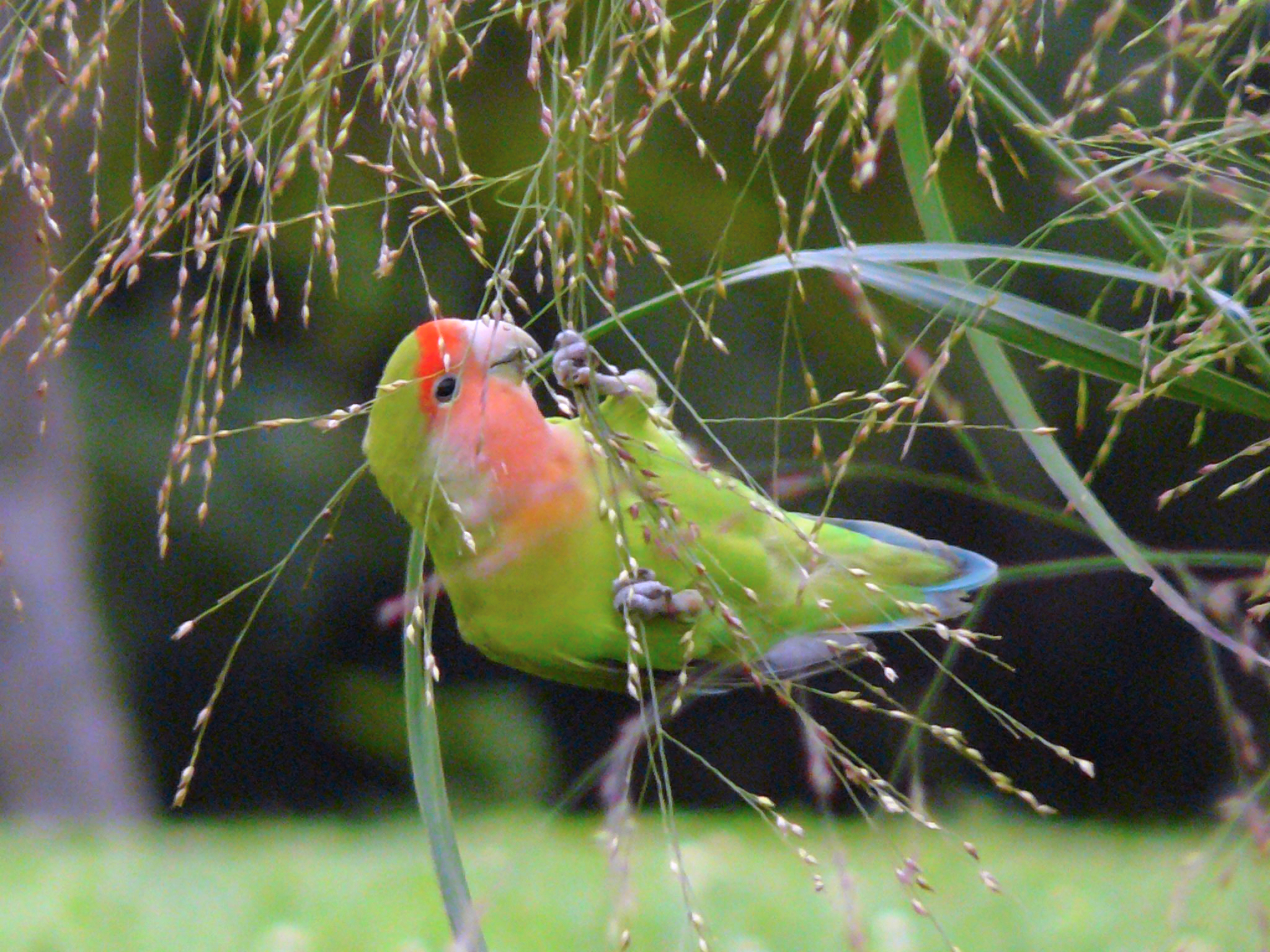
Peach-faced lovebird (Agapornis roseicollis)

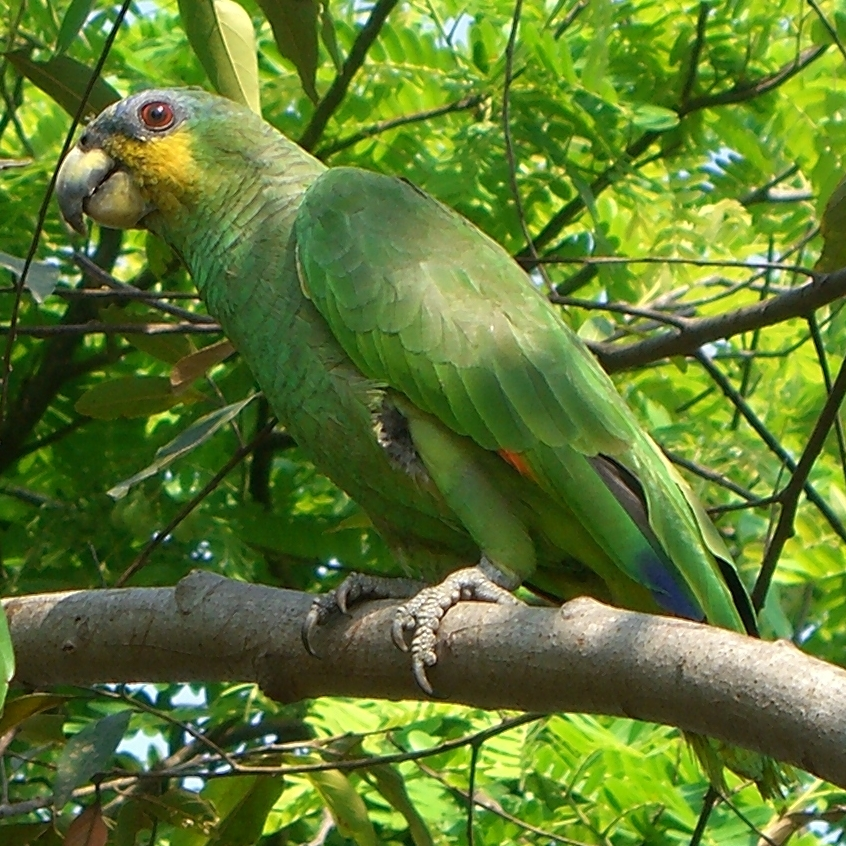
Orange-winged amazon (Amazona amazonica)

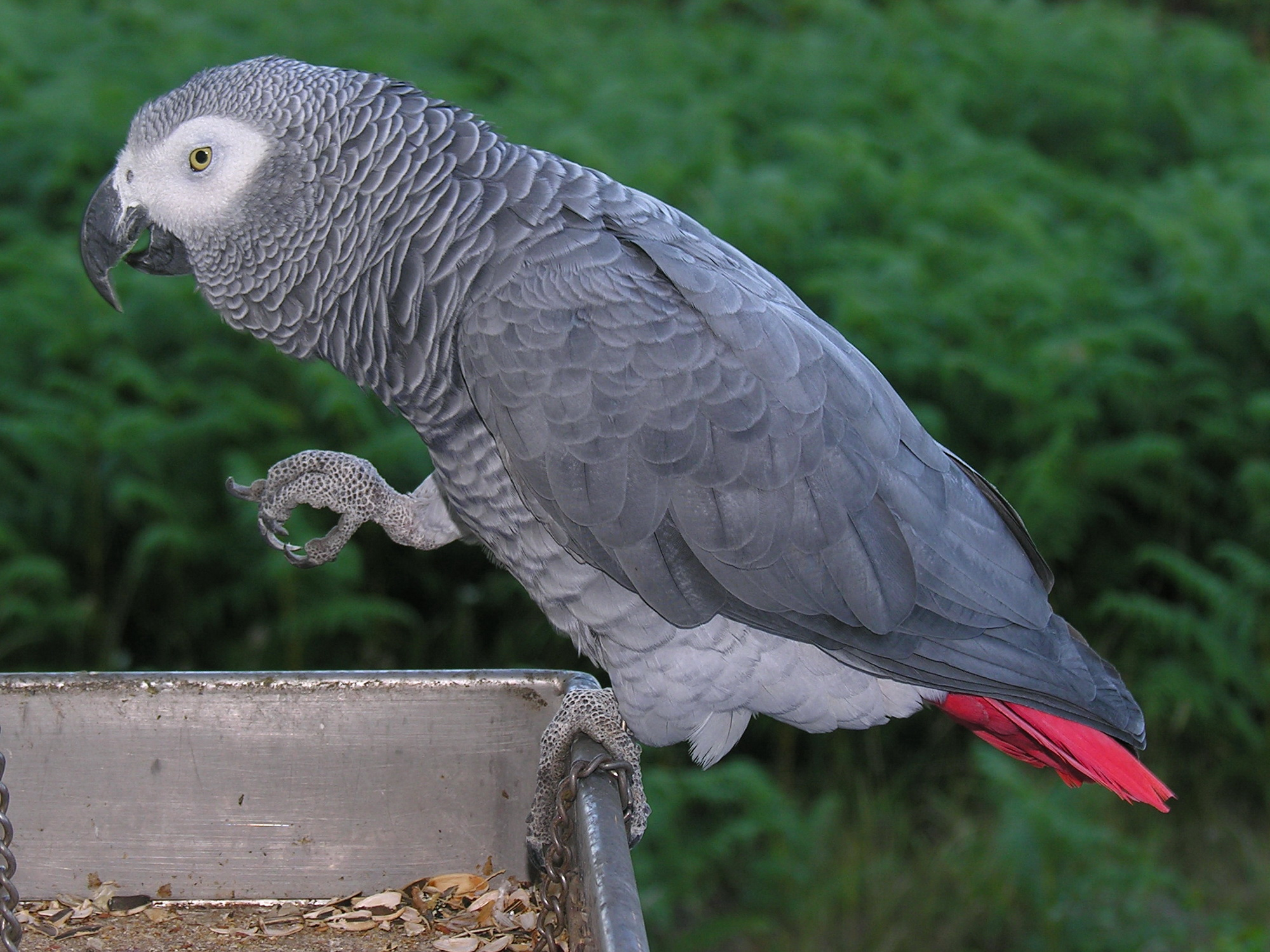
African grey parrot (Psittacus erithacus)
