= Viral: The Search for the Origin of COVID-19 =

2021 book by Alina Chan and Matt Ridley

- Author: Alina Chan and Matt Ridley
- Published: November 16, 2021
- Publisher: HarperCollins
- ISBN: 978-0-00-848749-2

Viral: The Search for the Origin of COVID-19 is a 2021 book by Canadian molecular biologist Alina Chan and British science writer Matt Ridley. The authors describe ongoing investigations into the origin of COVID-19. An updated version was published in June 2022.

== Reviews ==
The book has received mixed reviews. The Wall Street Journal's reviewer said the book has compiled "perhaps the most comprehensive case for the lab-leak theory currently available". Columnist Michael Hiltzik wrote in the Los Angeles Times that the authors "place[d] a conspiracy theory between hardcovers to masquerade as sober scientific inquiry." A review in The Times described it as concluding that the lab-leak hypothesis is "highly possible" rather than "definitely true". Writing in The Guardian, medical journalist Mark Honigsbaum considered the book's main argument to be unconvincing, and some of Chan and Ridley's descriptions to be "highly misleading". Author Steven Poole writing for the Daily Telegraph was unconvinced by the central thesis although he did support the authors in their plea to discontinue gain of function research.
