= The Moral Arc =

2015 book by Michael Shermer

- Cover of the first edition
- Author: Michael Shermer
- Language: English
- Subject: Social philosophy
- Publisher: Henry Holt and Company
- Publication date: 20 Jan 2015
- Publication place: United States
- Media type: Print (Hardcover)
- Pages: 560
- ISBN: 978-0-8050-9691-0

The Moral Arc: How Science Leads Humanity Toward Truth, Justice, and Freedom is a 2015 book by Michael Shermer. Science writer Steven Pinker described the book as a sequel to The Better Angels of Our Nature.

The title comes from a quotation from Martin Luther King Jr.'s famous "How Long, Not Long" speech: "the arc of the moral universe is long but it bends toward justice", a phrase originally coined by transcendentalist, abolitionist, and Unitarian minister Theodore Parker (1810–1860). In the book, Shermer argues that the rise of trade and literacy through the Industrial Revolution's need for highly educated knowledge workers, has created a "moral Flynn effect", leading to cultures with lower rates of violent crime. Shermer argues that the rise of full democracies around the world, combined with the spread of human rights and civil liberties has led to greater human flourishing. Shermer has stated that "[my] thesis is not for inevitable moral progress, we have to earn it, fight for it and argue for it." He also stated that he used "a lot of Utilitarian thinking, but in the end, the individual natural rights to survive and [the] flourish[ing] of sentient beings, [are] what counts".

Shermer criticises historical religious justifications for slavery, cruelty to animals, misogyny and homophobia, and writes that the spread of scientific and enlightened values has created a better foundation for civil society.

== See also ==
- War Before Civilization
- The Better Angels of Our Nature
- The Rational Optimist: How Prosperity Evolves
