= Anya Hurlbert =

Human visual perception scientist

The Right Honourable The Viscountess Ridley
- Born: April 1958 (age 68)
- Education: Princeton University (BS); Cambridge University (MASt, MA); MIT (PhD); Harvard Medical School (MD)
- Spouse: Matt Ridley (m. 1989)
- Children: 2
- Scientific career
- Fields: Vision science
- Workplaces: Newcastle University, UK
- Doctoral advisor: Tomaso Poggio and Peter Schiller

Anya Christine Hurlbert, also known as Viscountess Ridley (born April 1958), is a British academic who is Professor of Visual Neuroscience and Dean of Advancement at Newcastle University. Her research involves the study of the interaction between colour and light, and how these are interpreted by the human brain.

== Early life and education ==
Daughter of Dr Robert Boston Hurlbert (1926–2011), chief of the Nucleotide Metabolism section at the U.T. MD Anderson Hospital at Houston, Texas from 1962 to 1985, and Janina (née Patmalnieks), a clinical chemist at the Veterans Administration Hospital in Houston, Hurlbert was interested in science from a young age and was supported by her family. As a teenager she was interested in both mathematics and the brain.

She studied at Princeton University, graduating in 1980 with a bachelor's degree in physics. In 1982 she was awarded a Marshall scholarship and took a Part III Diploma in Theoretical Physics followed by an MA in physiology at Cambridge University. She was awarded a doctorate from MIT in 1989 in the area of brain and cognitive sciences and the following year gained an MD from Harvard Medical School. She then moved back to the UK and held a Wellcome Trust Vision Research Fellowship at Oxford University working with Andrew Parker.

== Career ==
Hurlbert's educational background within physics, medicine and neuroscience led to her appointment as a lecturer at Newcastle University in 1991, later becoming Professor of Visual Neuroscience. In 2003 Hurlbert was acting Head of the Division of Psychology, Brain and Behaviour (Faculty of Science, Agriculture and Engineering) and then interim Head in 2007. She was involved in development of the new School of Psychology in the university's Faculty of Medical Sciences.

In 2004 she was co-founder with Colin Ingram of the Institute of Neuroscience and its co-director until 2014. In 2012 she was involved in founding the Centre for Translational Systems Neuroscience at the university, part-funded by the Wellcome Trust. Among her external roles is as a member of Advisory Council of the Institute of Advanced Study at Durham University.

The focus of her research is on human visual perception, specifically how brains create and stabilise colour so that people see colours, often in different ways. This makes use of physics, psychology and neurobiology and she has developed technologies and algorithms to investigate colour constancy and perception. Her research has been applied in several very different areas including some medical conditions, artwork and exhibitions and also quality control of food. Her research group has also studied differing colour preferences among young men and women.

Hurlbert and colleagues participated in discussion about the science behind the 2015 social media event #the dress where people disagreed on whether it was black and royal blue, or white and gold in colour. The Newcastle scientists considered it from the aspect of individual perception of colour constancy.

In July 2022 Hurlbert was appointed as a trustee of the Science Museum Group for a period of 4 years from 1 November 2022 until 31 October 2026.

== Awards and honours ==
Hurlbert is a member of the Scientific Consultative Group, National Gallery, London and was the scientist trustee of the gallery from 2010 until 2018.

She is a member of the Optoelectronics Committee of the Rank Prize Funds.

She is a member of the advisory board of Current Biology, the editorial board of Journal of Vision, and the board of directors of the Vision Sciences Society.

She is a member of the advisory board to the GestaltReVision Methusalem Programme, held by Johan Wagemans at KU Leuven in Belgium.

In 2020 she was the guest in an episode of The Life Scientific on BBC Radio 4.

== Personal life ==
Hurlbert is married to Matt Ridley, 5th Viscount Ridley, and they have a son and a daughter.

== Selected publications ==
Papers, Commentaries, and Articles

- Hurlbert A. (2019) Challenges to Color Constancy in a Contemporary Light. Current Opinion in Behavioral Sciences 30 186–193.
- Crichton S, Shrestha L, Hurlbert A, Sturm B. (2018) Use of hyperspectral imaging for the prediction of moisture content and chromaticity of raw and pretreated apple slices during convection drying. Drying Technology 36 804–816.
- Aston S, Hurlbert A. (2017) What #theDress reveals about the role of illumination priors in color perception and color constancy. Journal of Vision 17(9).
- Brainard, David H and Hurlbert, Anya C. (2015) Colour Vision: Understanding #TheDress. Current Biology 25 (13):R551-4.
- Mackiewicz M, Finlayson GD, Hurlbert AC. (2015) Color Correction Using Root-Polynomial Regression. IEEE Transactions on Image Processing 24(5), 1460–1470.
- Brainard DH, Hurlbert AC. (2015) Colour Vision: Understanding #TheDress. Current Biology 25(13), R551-R554.
- Aspell JE, Tanskanen T, Hurlbert AC. (2005) Neuromagnetic correlates of visual motion coherence. European Journal of Neuroscience 22(11), 2937–2945.
- Hurlbert, A.C. (2007) Quick Guide: Colour Constancy. Current Biology 17 (21): R906-907.
- Hurlbert A. (2001) Trading faces. Nature Neuroscience 4(1), 3–5.
- Bloj MG, Kersten D, Hurlbert AC. (1999) Perception of three-dimensional shape influences colour perception through mutual illumination. Nature 402:877–879.
- Hurlbert A. (1998) Illusions and reality-checking on the small screen. Perception 27:633–636.
- Hurlbert A. (1997) Primer: Colour vision. Current Biology 7(7):R400-R402.
- Hurlbert AC. (1996) Colour vision: Putting it in context. Current Biology 6(11):1381–1384.
- Hurlbert AC. (1991) Visual perception: Deciphering the colour code. Nature 349:191–193.
- Hurlbert A. (1986) Formal connections between lightness algorithms. Journal of the Optical Society of America A 3:1684–1693.
- Hurlbert A, Poggio T. (1986) Do computers need attention? Nature 321(6071):651–652.

Book Chapters

- Hurlbert, Anya (2021). Colour and Vision. In Vision, Darwin College Lecture Series 2019. Cambridge University Press.
- Hurlbert, A. and Owen, K. A. (2015). Biological, cultural, and developmental influences on color preference. In Handbook of Color Psychology, Andrew J. Elliot and Mark D. Fairchild, Editors, Cambridge University Press. pp 454–480. ISBN 9781107043237
- Hurlbert, A. C. (2013). The Perceptual Quality of Colour. In The Wiley-Blackwell Handbook of Experimental Phenomenology : Visual Perception of Shape, Space and Appearance. Ed: L. Albertazzi. pp 369–394.
- Hurlbert A. (2004) Optical Illusions. In: Brown Th G, Creath K, Kogelnik H, Kriss MA, Schmit J, Weber MJ (eds). The Optics Encyclopedia. Volume 3. Wiley-VCH.
- Hurlbert AC. (1998) Computational models of colour constancy. In: Walsh V, Kulikowski J (eds). Perceptual Constancy: Why things look as they do. Cambridge University Press. pp 283–321.
- Hurlbert A, Poggio T. (1988) Making machines (and artificial intelligence) see. Daedalus, Journal of the American Academy of Arts and Sciences : Winter. (Re-published as “The Artificial Intelligence Debate”, MIT Press, Cambridge)
