= The Rational Optimist =

2010 book by Matt Ridley

- How Prosperity Evolves
- Author: Matt Ridley
- Language: English
- Publisher: Harper
- Publication date: 18 May 2010
- Publication place: United States
- Media type: Print (hardcover)
- Pages: 448

The Rational Optimist is a 2010 popular science book by Matt Ridley, author of The Red Queen: Sex and the Evolution of Human Nature. The book primarily focuses on the benefits of the innate human tendency to trade goods and services. Ridley argues that this trait, together with the specialization linked to it, is the source of modern human civilization, and that, as people increasingly specialize in their skill sets, we will have increased trade and more prosperity.

== Reception ==
Bill Gates praised the book for its key ideas on the importance of trade and the excessive pessimism prevalent in our society. Gates challenged the book's stance against international aid, raised questions about the author's expertise in discussing climate change, and suggested that it downplays the potential for global catastrophic risks. Ricardo Salinas Pliego praised the book as a defence of free trade and globalisation. Michael Shermer gave the book positive reviews in Nature and Scientific American before going on to present similar ideas in conference talks, and writing The Moral Arc partly in response. David Papineau praised the book for refuting "doomsayers who insist that everything is going from bad to worse".

George Monbiot criticised the book in his Guardian column. Critics of the book say it fails to address wealth inequality, and other criticisms of globalization.

== See also ==
- The Moral Arc
- The Better Angels of Our Nature
