= Shotton Surface Mine =

Coal mine in Northumberland, England

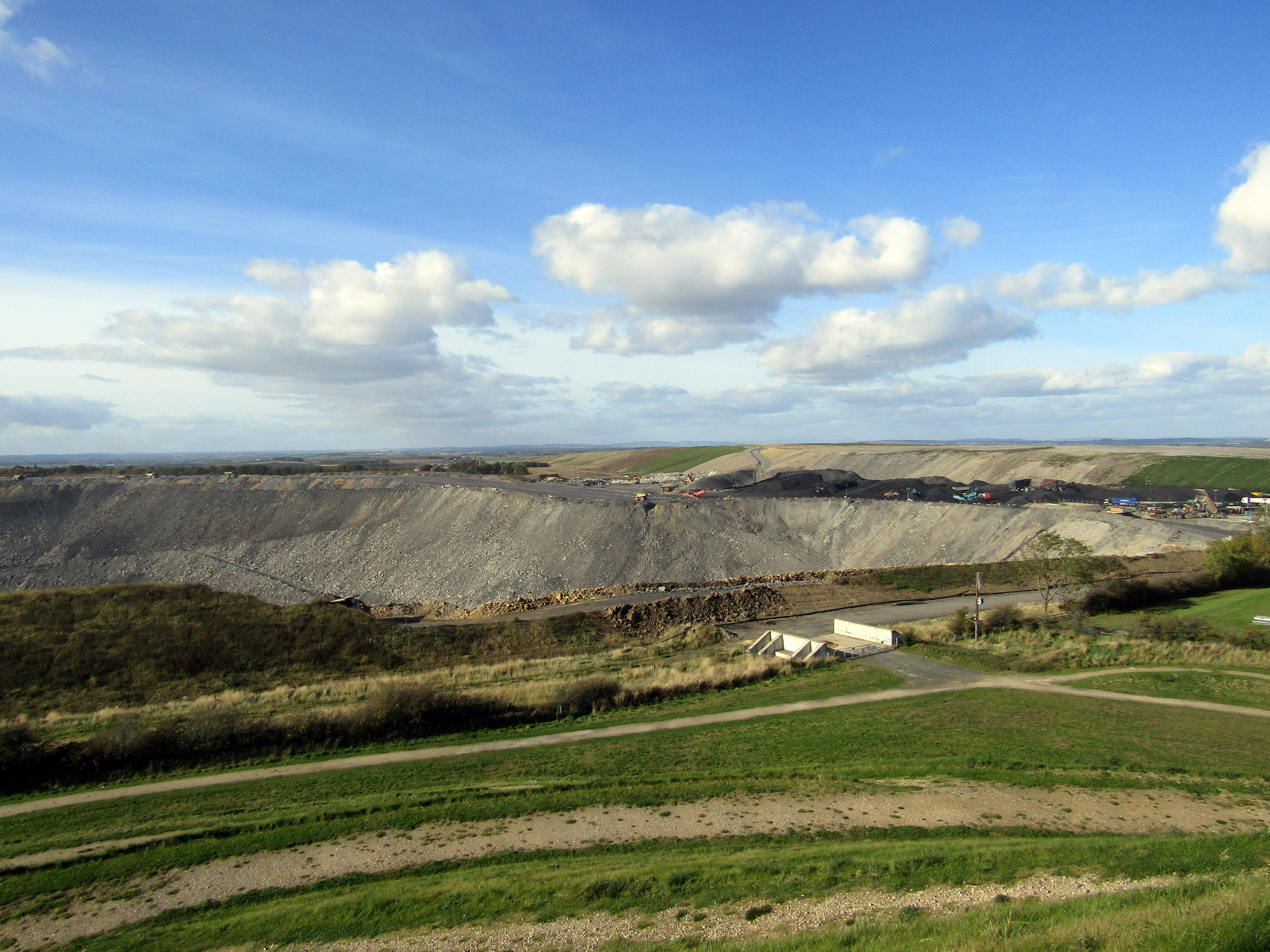

- Location within Northumberland
- Location: between Cramlington and Stannington, Northumberland, England; 55°05′22″N 1°38′27″W
- Products: Coal, shale, fireclay
- Type: Pit
- Opened: 2008
- Closed: 2020
- Company: Banks Group

Shotton Surface Mine was an open cast coal mine located on the estate of Blagdon Hall, Northumberland, England, operated by Banks Group. The mine was granted permission by the government in 2007, despite being refused permission by Blyth Valley Council, with an initial agreement to mine 3.4 million tonnes of coal, 2 million tonnes of shale and 750,000 tonnes of fireclay. This was subsequently extended by two years in 2011 to allow an additional 2 million tonnes of coal to be mined, set to end in 2016. An additional expansion approved in 2014 saw two new pits being opened on the site, Shotton Triangle (290,000 tonnes of coal) and Shotton South West (250,000 tonnes of coal), with the end date pushed back a year to October 2017; the land was expected to be restored by 2019. The mine eventually ceased production in summer 2020.

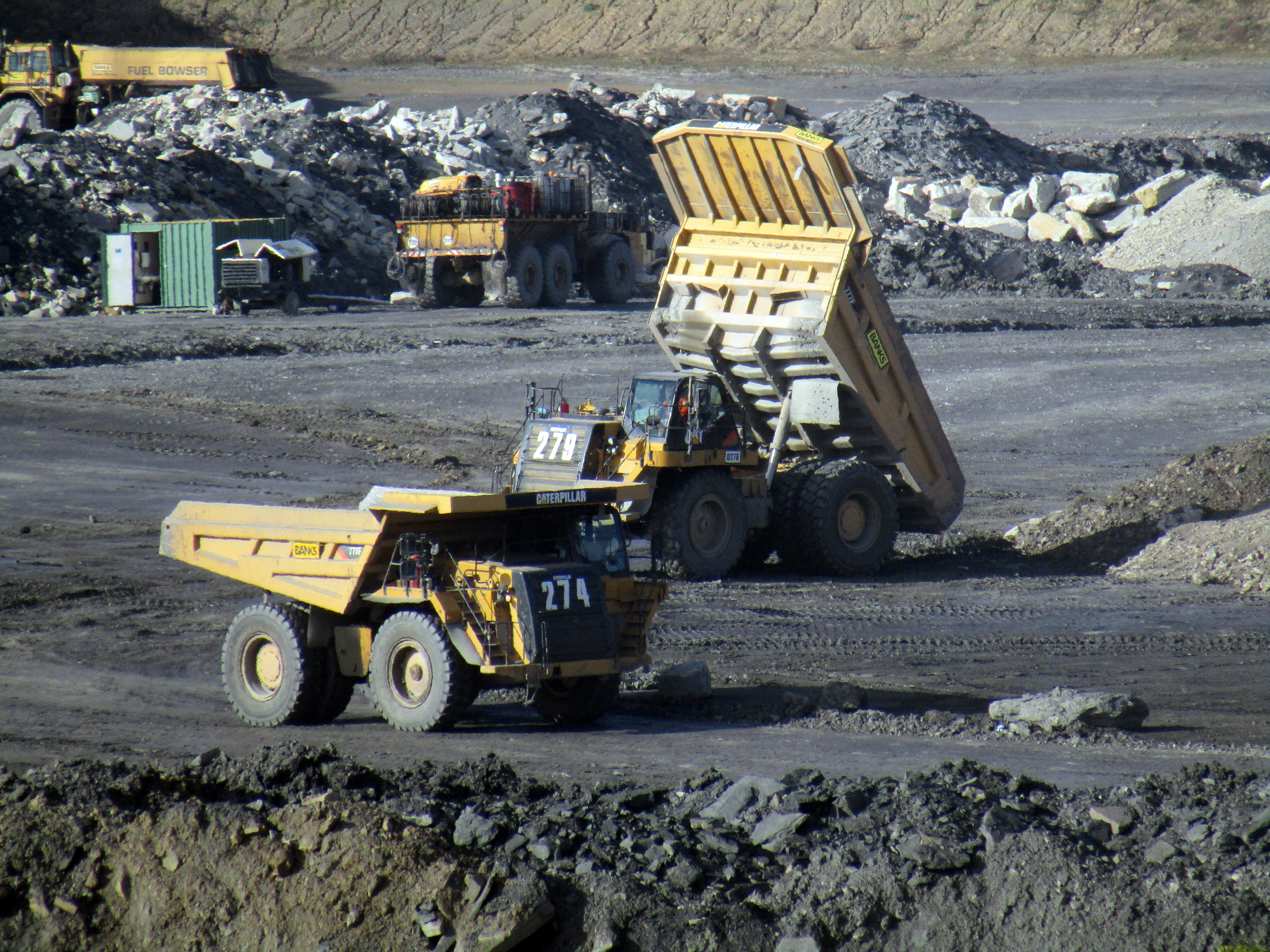
Caterpillar 777 haul trucks on the mine

In total, over 8% of British coal output comes from the Shotton site. The mine produced over one million tonnes of coal in 2014 and employs around 150 people. These jobs are temporary, although when the mine closes some former employees may be transferred to Banks' new site at Highthorn, near Druridge Bay.

The land on which the mine was developed is owned by science writer and Conservative hereditary peer Matthew White Ridley, 5th Viscount Ridley, who is a prominent climate change sceptic. As a result, the "Keep it in the Ground" fossil fuel divestment campaign had protested against the site; they picketed the site on 26 October 2015 and halted operations for the day. Royalties from the site go to the Government, but the Blagdon Estate receives a way leave payment estimated at between three and four million pounds.

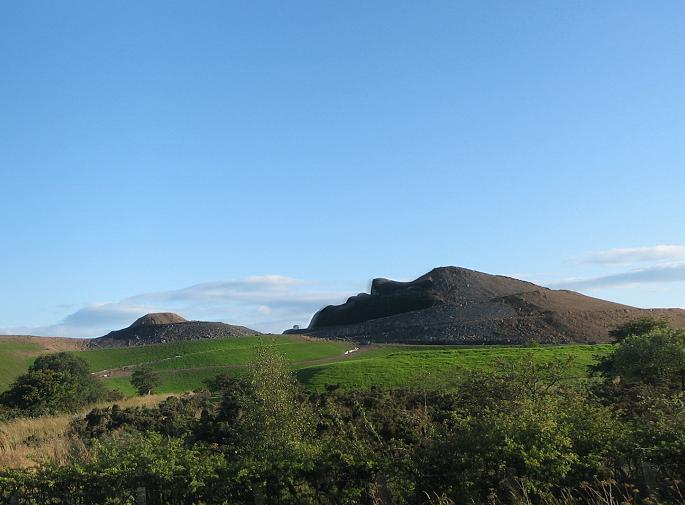
Northumberlandia under construction, showing the spoil beneath the surface

Over 1.5 million tonnes of waste material from the site was used to build the Northumberlandia sculpture on an adjoining site. Northumberlandia, which takes the form of a naked reclining female figure, was constructed as planning gain by the Banks Group to allow development of the Shotton site, and was opened as a public park in 2012.
