= Psittacosis =

Infectious disease in humans

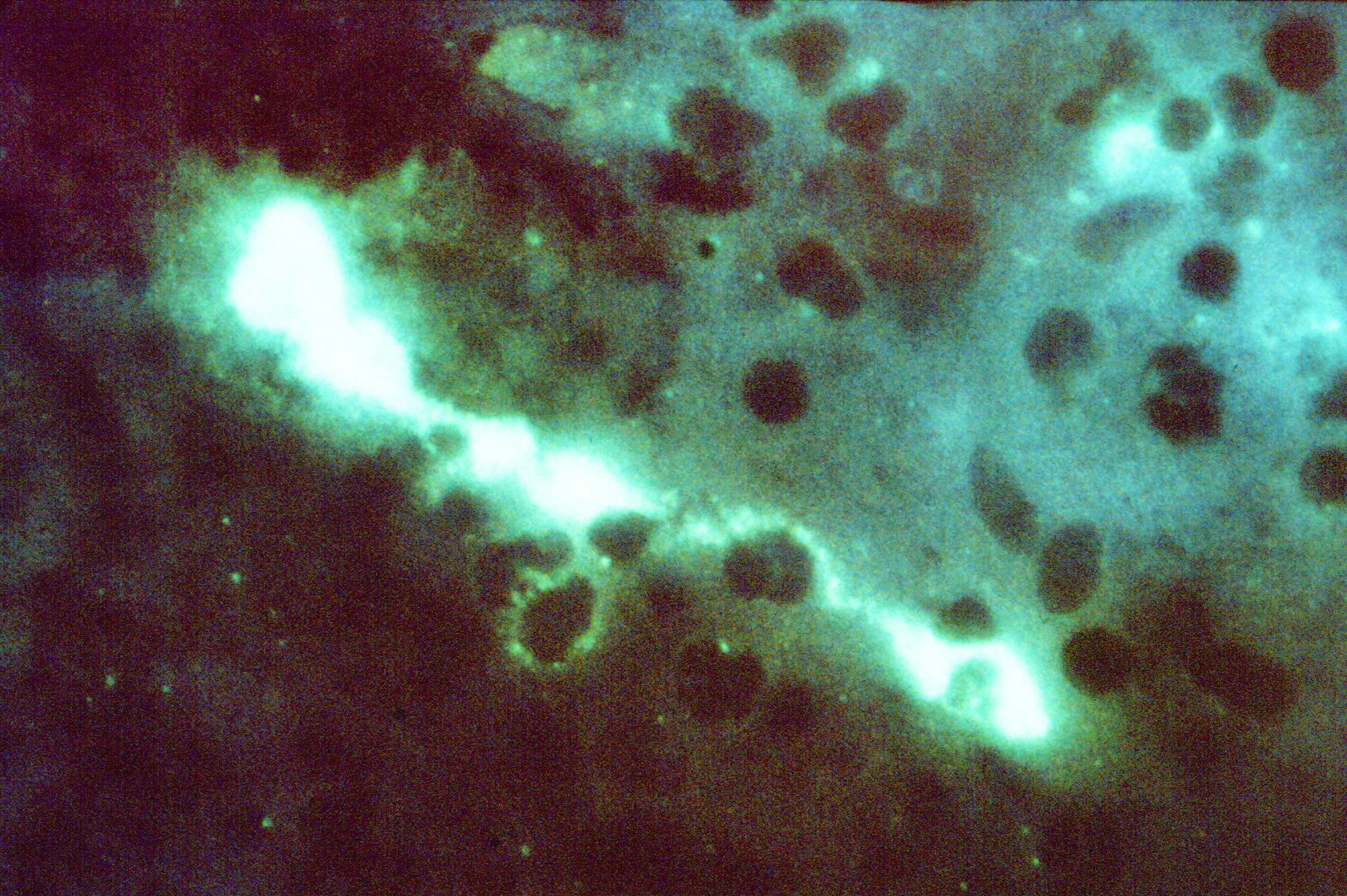
- Direct fluorescent antibody stain of a mouse brain impression smear showing C. psittaci
- Specialty: Infectious medicine Pulmonology

Psittacosis, also known as parrot fever or ornithosis, is a zoonotic infectious disease caused by the bacterium Chlamydia psittaci. Birds are the main reservoir, and human infection usually follows inhalation of aerosolised dried droppings or respiratory secretions from infected birds. Although many human infections are mild, psittacosis can cause pneumonia and occasionally severe complications including endocarditis, hepatitis, and neurologic disease.

== Transmission and reservoirs ==
C. psittaci commonly infects birds, including psittacine birds such as parrots, parakeets, cockatiels, and budgerigars, but human infection has also been linked to pigeons, turkeys, chickens, ducks, and other birds. Many infected birds have no obvious clinical signs but may shed organisms in feces and respiratory secretions for prolonged periods.

Humans are infected mainly by inhaling dust contaminated with dried droppings or respiratory secretions from infected birds. Less common routes include bites and beak-to-mouth contact. There is no evidence that psittacosis is spread by handling or eating poultry products, and documented person-to-person transmission is very rare.

== Signs and symptoms ==
The incubation period is usually 5 to 14 days, although symptom onset may occasionally occur later. In humans, psittacosis ranges from asymptomatic infection or a mild influenza-like illness to severe atypical pneumonia. Common symptoms include fever, chills, headache, myalgia, and a non-productive cough. Some patients also develop shortness of breath, while less common features such as gastrointestinal symptoms, rash, splenomegaly, and pulse–temperature dissociation have also been reported. Chest imaging in patients with pneumonia may show lobar or interstitial infiltrates. Uncommon complications include hepatitis, encephalitis, endocarditis, myocarditis, and respiratory failure. With appropriate antibiotic treatment, mortality is low, but untreated infection may be severe and occasionally fatal.

== Diagnosis ==
Diagnosis can be difficult because psittacosis resembles other causes of atypical pneumonia and because routine microbiologic testing does not always include C. psittaci. Diagnostic methods include serology, polymerase chain reaction, and other specialized laboratory testing. More recent reports have described the use of metagenomic next-generation sequencing in selected severe or unclear cases, although this is not the standard method in all settings.

== Treatment ==
Tetracyclines, especially doxycycline, are generally considered first-line therapy for psittacosis in adults. Macrolides may be used in some patients when tetracyclines are unsuitable. Early treatment is associated with improved outcomes.

== Prevention ==
There is no human vaccine for psittacosis. Prevention focuses on reducing exposure to infected birds and contaminated dust. Recommended measures include washing hands after handling birds or items in cages, wetting surfaces before cleaning, avoiding dry sweeping or vacuuming of contaminated material, and using gloves and appropriate masks when handling infected birds or cleaning their cages.

Control in birds includes avoiding overcrowding, not stacking cages directly over one another, isolating and treating infected birds, and cleaning cages and food and water containers regularly. WOAH states that no commercial vaccines are available for avian chlamydiosis control in poultry.

== Epidemiology ==
Psittacosis cases occur worldwide, with sporadic outbreaks reported in both developed and developing countries. Occupational exposure among bird breeders, poultry workers, and veterinarians increases the risk of infection.

Surveillance data from the CDC indicate that reported human cases have declined due to improved diagnostic capabilities and awareness, though under-reporting remains a concern. In some regions, outbreaks have been associated with imported pet birds or poorly regulated bird trade markets.

== History ==
Psittacosis was first documented in the 1870s, with major outbreaks occurring in the early 20th century. A significant outbreak in 1929–1930, linked to imported parrots, led to increased scientific interest and research into the disease. The causative agent, Chlamydia psittaci, was identified in the 1930s, paving the way for improved diagnostic techniques and treatment options.

Since then, regulations on the pet trade and public health interventions have contributed to reducing the spread of psittacosis, though sporadic outbreaks continue to occur.

== In birds ==
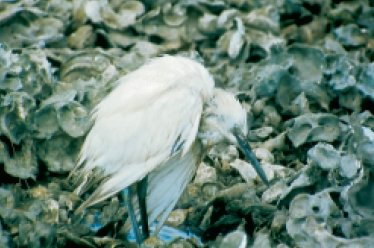
An immature little blue heron with psittacosis

In birds, Chlamydia psittaci infection is referred to as avian chlamydiosis. Infected birds shed the bacteria through feces and nasal discharges, which can remain infectious for several months. Many strains remain quiescent in birds until activated under stress. Birds are excellent, highly mobile vectors for the distribution of chlamydial infection because they feed on, and have access to, the detritus of infected animals of all sorts.

=== Signs ===
C. psittaci in birds is often systemic and infections can be inapparent, severe, acute, or chronic with intermittent shedding. Signs in birds include "inflamed eyes, difficulty in breathing, watery droppings, and green urates."

=== Diagnosis ===
Initial diagnosis may be by symptoms, but is usually confirmed by an antigen and antibody test. A polymerase chain reaction-based test is also available. Although any of these tests can confirm psittacosis, false negatives are possible, so a combination of clinical and laboratory tests is recommended before giving the bird a clean bill of health.

=== Epidemiology ===
Infection is usually by the droppings of another infected bird, though it can also be transmitted by feathers and eggs, and is typically either inhaled or ingested.

C. psittaci strains in birds infect mucosal epithelial cells and macrophages of the respiratory tract. Septicaemia eventually develops and the bacteria become localized in epithelial cells and macrophages of most organs, conjunctiva, and gastrointestinal tract. It can also be passed in the eggs. Stress commonly triggers onset of severe symptoms, resulting in rapid deterioration and death. C. psittaci strains are similar in virulence, grow readily in cell culture, have 16S-rRNA genes that differ by <0.8%, and belong to eight known serovars. All should be considered to be readily transmissible to humans.

C. psittaci serovar A is endemic among psittacine birds and has caused sporadic zoonotic disease in humans, other mammals, and tortoises. Serovar B is endemic among pigeons, has been isolated from turkeys, and has also been identified as the cause of abortion in a dairy herd. Serovars C and D are occupational hazards for slaughterhouse workers and for people in contact with birds. Serovar E isolates (known as Cal-10, MP, or MN) have been obtained from a variety of avian hosts worldwide, and although they were associated with the 1920s–1930s outbreak in humans, a specific reservoir for serovar E has not been identified. The M56 and WC serovars were isolated during outbreaks in mammals.

== One Health and public health significance ==
Psittacosis is often cited as a classic One Health problem because disease risk depends on the interaction between human health, animal health, and the shared environment. Human cases occur among bird owners as well as workers in farms, poultry processing plants, pet shops, veterinary offices, laboratories, zoos, and avian quarantine stations. Public health response therefore requires coordination between clinicians, veterinarians, laboratories, employers, and animal health authorities.

In the United States, psittacosis is uncommon and nationally tracked through the National Notifiable Diseases Surveillance System. Reported case counts decreased between 1988 and 2010 and have remained low overall since then, although periodic outbreaks still occur. CDC notes that a multistate outbreak among poultry plant workers in 2018 included 13 laboratory-confirmed cases. Systematic review evidence suggests that poultry, especially turkeys, chickens, and ducks, are important sources of zoonotic transmission in addition to parrots and other pet birds.

== Use as a biological weapon ==
Psittacosis was one of more than a dozen agents that the United States researched as potential biological weapons before the nation suspended its biological weapons program.

== Notable casualties ==
In 1930, during the 1929–1930 psittacosis pandemic, Lena Rose Pepperdine died of parrot fever. She was the first wife of George Pepperdine, the founder of Pepperdine University.
