= The Red Queen: Sex and the Evolution of Human Nature =

1993 popular science book by Matt Ridley

- Cover of the first UK edition
- Author: Matt Ridley
- Language: English
- Publisher: Viking Books (UK); Harper Perennial (US)
- Publication date: 1993
- Media type: Print
- Pages: 405
- ISBN: 978-0060556570
- OCLC: 59899749
- Preceded by: Warts and All
- Followed by: Down to Earth

The Red Queen: Sex and the Evolution of Human Nature is a popular science book by Matt Ridley exploring the evolutionary psychology of sexual selection. The Red Queen was one of seven books shortlisted for the 1994 Rhône-Poulenc Prize (now known as the Royal Society Prizes for Science Books), that was eventually won by Steve Jones' The Language of the Genes. The title is in reference to the Red Queen hypothesis in evolutionary biology.

Ridley argues that few, if any, aspects of human nature can be understood apart from sex, since human nature is a product of evolution, driven by sexual reproduction in the case of sexual selection in human evolution.

== Summary ==
The book begins with an evolutionary account of sex itself, defending the theory that sex flourishes, despite its energetic costs, primarily because a sexually mixed heritage confers to offspring a defensive "head start" against parasites received from and originally adapted to the maternal host environment.

Toward the end of the book Ridley argues that human intelligence is largely a result of sexual selection. He argues that human intelligence far outstrips any survivalist demands that would have been placed on our hominid ancestors, and analogizes human intelligence to the peacock's tail, a trait widely believed to be the result of sexual selection. Human intelligence, he suggests, is used primarily to attract mates through prodigious displays of wit, charm, inventiveness, and individuality. This view of Intelligence is treated at length in Geoffrey Miller's The Mating Mind: How Sexual Choice Shaped the Evolution of Human Nature (2001).

== See also ==
- The Rational Optimist: How Prosperity Evolves
