= Banks Group =

The Banks Group Limited
- Formerly: Copeprivate Limited (1988–1989)
- Industry: Mining; Energy; Property development
- Founded: 1976
- Headquarters: Durham, England
- Website: banksgroup.co.uk

The Banks Group Limited is a family owned business headquartered in Durham, but working across Scotland and the North of England, established in 1976. Banks develops and operates in a variety of business areas including property development, renewables generation, flexible energy generation and storage, and mineral extraction and infrastructure services. The Banks Group was founded by Harry Banks OBE DL with his brothers Graham Banks, Joe Banks and Bruce Banks.

== Divisions ==
Banks Property develops land in the north of England and Scotland for the building of new homes, and has obtained planning permission for the building of 10,000 new homes.

Banks Renewables installs wind turbines and operates ten onshore wind farms across Northern England and Scotland, with the company's second solar endeavour, Barnsdale Solar near Leeds, receiving planning permission in July 2021. As part of the company's renewables projects, they operate a Community Fund scheme which donates to local community groups and voluntary organisations near their active renewables projects.

Banks Mining was a division formerly active in open-cast or surface coal mining. The division has restored and landscaped every surface mine it has worked on. However, the group ceased surface coal extraction in 2021.

In 2012, Banks completed construction of Northumberlandia, a huge, award-winning, land sculpture in the shape of a reclining female figure near Cramlington, Northumberland. Banks Group and the Blagdon Estate jointly financed the £2.5m cost of the work, as planning gain for Banks' adjacent open-cast Shotton Surface Mine, which was approved in 2007. The mine was approved in 2007 despite 2,500 objections and previous refusal by Northumberland County Council.

Banks Group won a Marketplace Innovation Award from Business in the Community for its technologies to reduce noise from mining operations.
