= Mark Honigsbaum =

British journalist

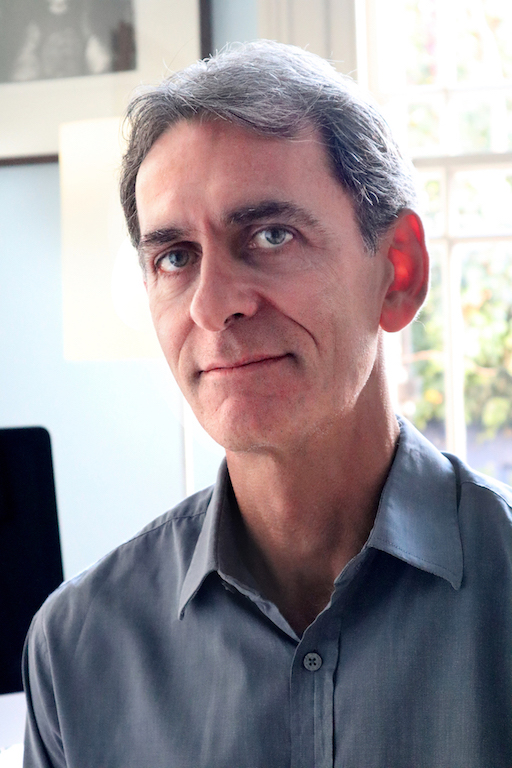
- Born: November 21, 1960 (age 65); London
- Education: Latymer Upper School, Hammersmith
- Alma mater: New College, Oxford (BA, MA); Queen Mary, University of London (PhD).
- Occupations: Medical historian, journalist
- Spouse: Jeanette Quinn (m. 1990)
- Website: Official website

Mark Honigsbaum is a medical historian and journalist specializing in the history and science of infectious disease. He is currently a Senior Lecturer in the Department of Journalism at City, University of London.

Honigsbaum graduated from Oxford University in 1982 with a BA and M.A. in Politics, Philosophy and Economics, then in 1984 joined the National Council for the Training of Journalists as a senior journalist. In 2011 he was awarded a Doctor of Philosophy (History) from the University of London. In 2013 he was awarded a post-doctoral research fellowship by the Wellcome Trust to study the intellectual origins of disease ecology.

== Work ==
Honigsbaum is a regular contributor to The Observer and The Lancet. He is the author of five books. The most recent, The Pandemic Century: One Hundred Years of Panic, Hysteria, and Hubris (London; New York: Hurst; Norton 2019) was named one of the best books of the year in the "Health" category by the Financial Times and an “Editor’s Choice” by the New York Times. In June 2020 W. H. Allen published a revised paperback edition under the new title The Pandemic Century: A Global History of Contagion from Spanish Flu to Covid-19. He is also author of The Fever Trail: In Search of the Cure for Malaria (London: New York: Macmillan; Farrar Straus and Giroux, 2001) and Living With Enza: The Forgotten Story of Britain and the Great Flu Pandemic of 1918 (Macmillan, 2008) which was longlisted for the Royal Society science book of the year in 2009.

In addition to his regular contributions to The Observer and The Lancet Honigsbaum has been published in Medical History, the Social History of Medicine and the History and Philosophy of the Life Sciences. Earlier in his career he served as an investigative reporter and feature writer at newspapers including the Evening Standard, The Independent on Sunday, The Observer and The Guardian. In 1996 he led an investigation for Channel 4 Dispatches that exposed the role of M16 and Rolls-Royce in re-arming the Argentine Navy in breach of then British sanctions against the Galtieri regime in Argentina. His reporting for The Guardian on the London suicide bombings on July 7, 2005, was the source of a long-lived conspiracy theory that the bombings were a staged event.

His work also includes animations for museums and web-based education platforms.

In 2018 he gave the Henry Cohen lecture in the history of medicine at Liverpool Medical Institution. In 2020 he delivered a Bynum Lecture in the history of medicine for the Royal Society of Medicine.

== Personal history ==
Honigsbaum's father, Frank, who died in 2004, was also a medical historian and a prominent advocate for universal health insurance and the general practitioner system. His mother, Naomi, worked for many years at the National Children's Bureaus as an expert on HIV and children.
