= Cell engineering =

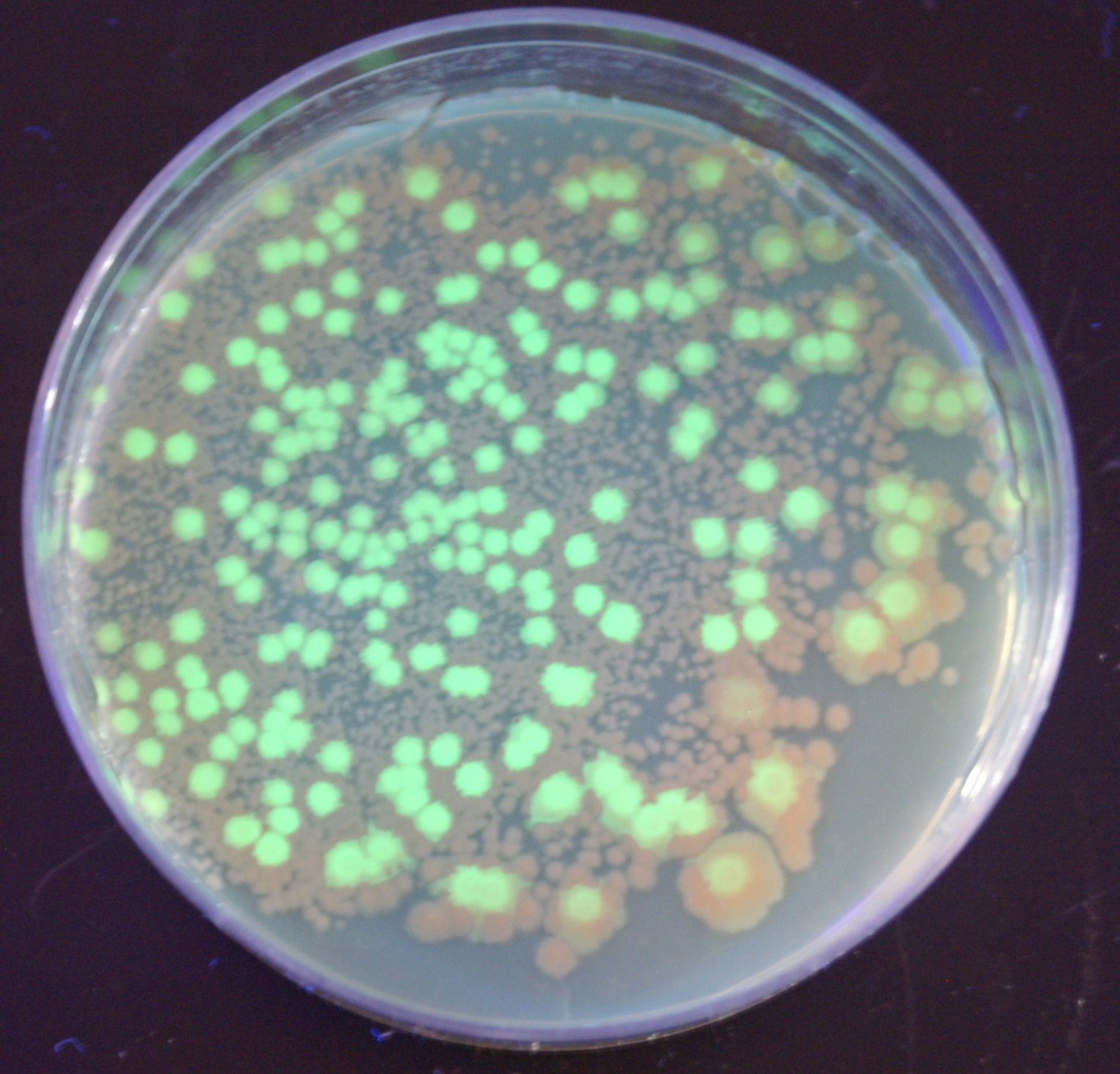
Cells engineered to fluoresce under UV light.

Cell engineering is the purposeful process of adding, deleting, or modifying genetic sequences in living cells to achieve biological engineering goals such as altering cell production, changing cell growth and proliferation requirements, adding or removing cell functions, and many more. Cell engineering often makes use of recombinant DNA technology to achieve these modifications as well as closely related tissue engineering methods. Cell engineering can be characterized as an intermediary level in the increasingly specific disciplines of biological engineering which includes organ engineering, tissue engineering, protein engineering, and genetic engineering.

The field of cellular engineering is gaining more traction as biomedical research advances in tissue engineering and becomes more specific. Publications in the field have gone from several thousand in the early 2000s to nearly 40,000 in 2020.

== Overview ==
=== Improving production of natural cellular products ===
One general form of cell engineering involves altering natural cell production to achieve a more desirable yield or shorter production time. A possible method for changing natural cell production includes boosting or repressing genes that are involved in the metabolism of the product. For example, researchers were able to overexpress transporter genes in hamster ovary cells to increase monoclonal antibody yield. Another approach could involve incorporating biologically foreign genes into an existing cell line. For example, E.Coli, which synthesizes ethanol, can be modified using genes from Zymomonas mobilis to make ethanol fermentation the primary cell fermentation product.

=== Altering cell requirements ===
Another beneficial cell modification is the adjustment of substrate and growth requirements of a cell. By changing cell needs, the raw material cost, equipment expenses, and skill required to grow and maintain cell cultures can be significantly reduced. For example, scientists have used foreign enzymes to engineer a common industrial yeast strain which allows the cells to grow on substrate cheaper than the traditional glucose. Because of the biological engineering focus on improving scale-up costs, research in this area is largely focused on the ability of various enzymes to metabolize low-cost substrates.

=== Augmenting cells to produce new products ===
Closely tied with the field of biotechnology, this subject of cell engineering employs recombinant DNA methods to induce cells to construct a desired product such as a protein, antibody, or enzyme. One of the most notable examples of this subset of cellular engineering is the transformation of E. Coli to transcript and translate a precursor to insulin which drastically reduced the cost of production. Similar research was conducted shortly after in 1979 in which E. Coli was transformed to express human growth hormone for use in treatment of pituitary dwarfism. Finally, much progress has been made in engineering cells to produce antigens for the purpose of creating vaccines.

=== Adjustment of cell properties ===
Within the focus of bioengineering, various cell modification methods are utilized to alter inherent properties of cells such as growth density, growth rate, growth yield, temperature resistance, freezing tolerance, chemical sensitivity, and vulnerability to pathogens. For example, in 1988 one group of researchers from the Illinois Institute of Technology successfully expressed a Vitreoscilla hemoglobin gene in E. Coli to create a strain that was more tolerant to low-oxygen conditions such as those found in high density industrial bioreactors.

=== Stem cell engineering ===
One distinct section of cell engineering involves the alteration and tuning of stem cells. Much of the recent research on stem cell therapies and treatments falls under the aforementioned cell engineering methods. Stem cells are unique in that they may differentiate into various other types of cells which may then be altered to produce novel therapeutics or provide a foundation for further cell engineering efforts. One example of directed stem cell engineering includes partially differentiating stem cells into myocytes to enable production of pro-myogenic factors for the treatment of sarcopenia or muscle disuse atrophy.

== History ==
The phrase "cell engineering" was first used in a published paper in 1968 to describe the process of improving fuel cells. The term was then adopted by other papers until the more specific "fuel-cell engineering" was used.

The first use of the term in a biological context was in 1971 in a paper which describes methods to graft reproductive caps between algae cells. Despite the rising popularity of the phrase, there remains unclear boundaries between cell engineering and other forms of biological engineering.

== Examples ==
- Therapeutic T cell engineering: altering T cells to target cancer-related antigens for treatment
- Monoclonal antibody production: improving monoclonal antibody production using engineered cells
- In vivo cell factories: engineering cells to produce therapeutics within the patient's body
- Directed stem cell differentiation: using external factors to direct stem cell differentiation
- Antibody Drug Conjugates: engineering antibody and cytotoxic drug linkages for disease treatment
