= Hugh Percy, 10th Duke of Northumberland =

British politician (1914–1988)

His Grace The Duke of Northumberland KG GCVO TD PC JP FRS
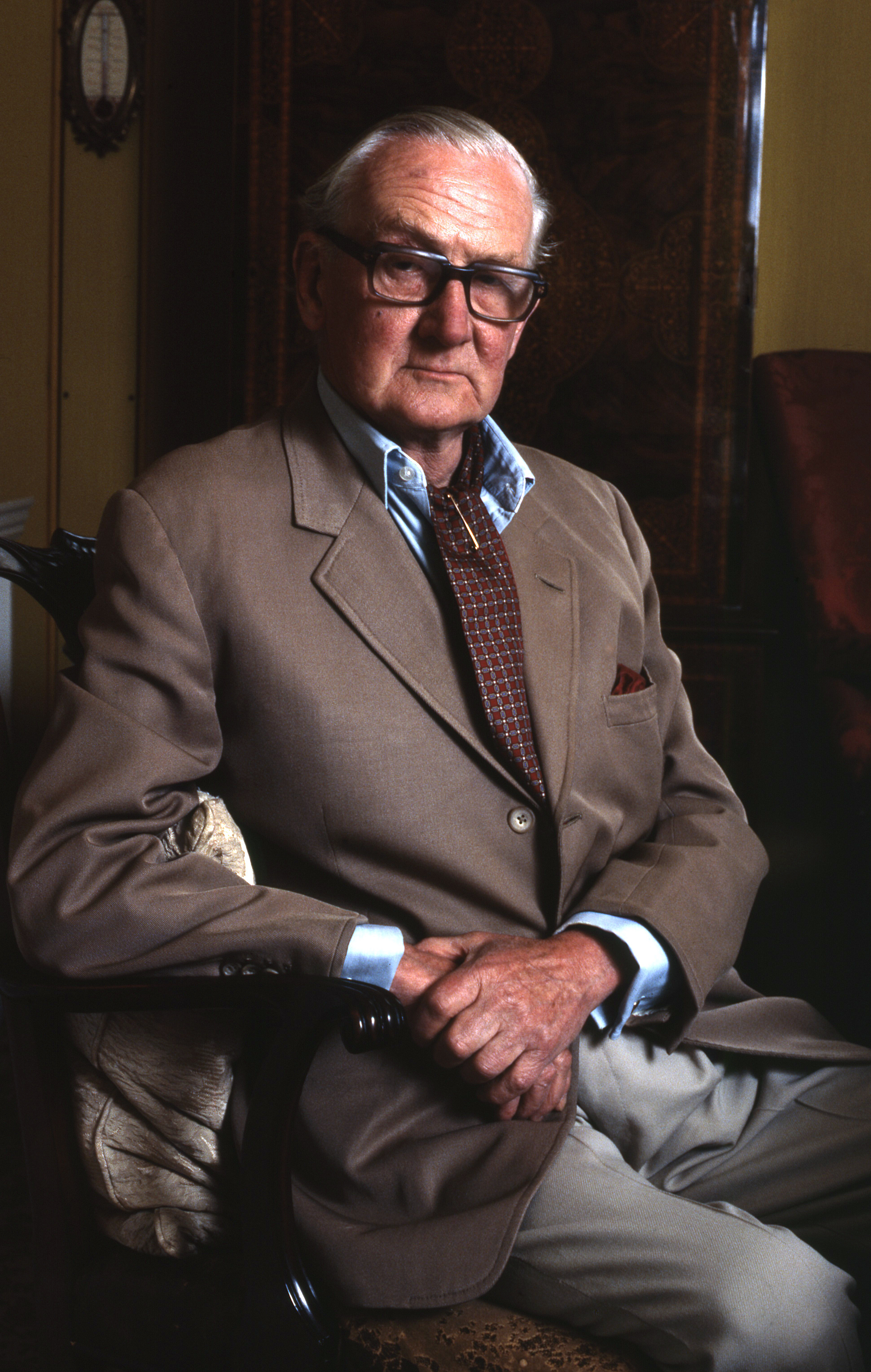
- Northumberland in 1980 by Allan Warren

Lord Steward of the Household
- In office 2 January 1973 – 11 October 1988
- Monarch: Elizabeth II
- Preceded by: The Viscount Cobham
- Succeeded by: The Viscount Ridley

Lord Lieutenant of Northumberland
- In office 18 May 1956 – 3 January 1984
- Monarch: Elizabeth II
- Preceded by: The Viscount Allendale
- Succeeded by: The Viscount Ridley

Chancellor of the University of Newcastle upon Tyne
- In office 1963–1988
- Preceded by: New university
- Succeeded by: The Viscount Ridley

Personal details
- Born: Hugh Algernon Percy; 6 April 1914
- Died: 11 October 1988 (aged 74) Syon House, London, United Kingdom
- Resting place: Northumberland Vault, Westminster Abbey
- Party: Conservative
- Spouse: Lady Elizabeth Montagu Douglas Scott (m. 1946)
- Children: 7; including Henry and Ralph
- Parent(s): Alan Percy, 8th Duke of Northumberland; Lady Helen Gordon-Lennox
- Education: Christ Church, Oxford

Military service
- Allegiance: United Kingdom
- Branch/service: British Army
- Years of service: 1936–1964
- Rank: Captain
- Unit: Northumberland Hussars; Royal Regiment of Artillery
- Battles/wars: Second World War
- Awards: See list

Hugh Algernon Percy, 10th Duke of Northumberland (6 April 1914 – 11 October 1988), styled Lord Hugh Percy between 1918 and 1940, was a British landowner, soldier and peer. He was the son of Alan Percy, 8th Duke of Northumberland, and Lady Helen Gordon-Lennox. He succeeded to the dukedom of Northumberland in 1940 when his brother, the 9th Duke, was killed in action in World War II.

He served in the Northumberland Hussars and the Royal Regiment of Artillery during World War II, rising to the rank of captain. After the war, he served as a Conservative whip in the Churchill caretaker ministry. Later, he served as Lord Steward of Queen Elizabeth II's Household from 1973 until his death, Lord Lieutenant of Northumberland from 1956 until 1984 and as the first Chancellor of the University of Newcastle upon Tyne from its formation in 1963 until his death.

== Early life and family ==
Hugh Algernon Percy was born on 6 April 1914. He was the second son of Alan, Earl Percy, later the 8th Duke of Northumberland, and his wife, Lady Helen Gordon-Lennox, herself the daughter of the 7th Duke of Richmond. From birth, as the younger son of an earl, he was entitled to the prefix The Honourable by courtesy. When his father acceded to the dukedom upon the death of his paternal grandfather, the 7th Duke, in 1918, he became known as Lord Hugh Percy. His siblings included: George, 9th Duke of Northumberland; Elizabeth, Duchess of Hamilton; Diana, Duchess of Sutherland; and Lord Richard Percy.

He was educated at Eton College and Christ Church, Oxford.

== Career ==
On 15 April 1936, he was commissioned as a Second Lieutenant in the Northumberland Hussars. He became 10th Duke of Northumberland on 21 May 1940 when his childless elder brother was killed in action in Flanders, Belgium, in the leadup to the Battle of Dunkirk. In 1940, as a lieutenant, he transferred to the Royal Regiment of Artillery. He served in Crete and on the North African campaign. In 1947, as a captain, he transferred back to the Northumberland Hussars.

Following the death of his brother, he took his seat in the House of Lords as a Conservative Lord Temporal, making his maiden speech on 29 November 1944 in reply to King George VI's Speech from the Throne. He also took on management of the family estates, namely Alnwick Castle in Northumberland, Albury Park in Surrey and Syon House in London. He also succeeded his brother as Master of the Percy Foxhounds.

On 1 June 1945, he was appointed Lord-in-waiting to King George VI, remaining in the position until 23 October 1945. As Lord-in-Waiting, he was a junior government whip in the Churchill caretaker ministry. He carried Curtana at the 1953 coronation of Queen Elizabeth II. In 1957, he gained the additional peerage of Baron Percy upon the death of his kinsman, James, 9th Duke of Atholl.

In 1963, when the University of Newcastle upon Tyne became independent from the University of Durham, Northumberland was appointed their first Chancellor and retained the post until his death. As chancellor, the Duke presented an honorary degree to Martin Luther King Jr. in November 1967, five months before Dr King's assassination. He donated many books and works of art to the university's library.

He was appointed Lord Lieutenant of Northumberland on 18 May 1956, a position previously held by his father and many of his ancestors which he held until 1984. On 2 January 1973, Northumberland succeeded the 10th Viscount Cobham as Lord Steward of the Household of Queen Elizabeth II, the most senior of the Great Offices of the Royal Households of the United Kingdom.

In 1970, he was elected a fellow of the Royal Society. On 9 March 1973, he was appointed a member of the Royal Commission on Historical Manuscripts. He chaired or was a member of a number of councils and committees such as the Agricultural Research Council, Medical Research Council and the Committee of Enquiry on Foot and Mouth Disease. He was president of the Royal Agricultural Society of England in 1956 and 1962 and president of the Roxburghe Club from 1975 to 1988.

He held the position of Honorary Colonel in various battalions of the Royal Northumberland Fusiliers, Northumbrian Volunteers and the Royal Regiment of Fusiliers.

In recognition of his service, on 24 April 1959, he was appointed the 922nd Knight Companion of the Order of the Garter and made a Knight Grand Cross of the Royal Victorian Order in the 1981 Birthday Honours.

== Marriage and issue ==
On 12 June 1946, he married Lady Elizabeth Diana Montagu Douglas Scott, daughter of the 8th Duke of Buccleuch, at Westminster Abbey. The Duke rode on horseback from Alnwick to Drumlanrig Castle to propose to Lady Elizabeth. The marriage united the Percy and Douglas families who had feuded for centuries, including at the Battle of Otterburn in 1388. Guests at the wedding included King George VI and Queen Elizabeth, Queen Mary, King George II of Greece, Princess Elizabeth and Princess Margaret.

They had seven children:

- Lady Caroline Mary Percy (born 3 May 1947). She married Pierre, Comte de Cabarrus, on 12 January 1974 and had issue.
- Lady Victoria Lucy Diana Percy (born 19 April 1949). She married, first, Aidan Cuthbert on 4 October 1975 and had issue including Lucy, wife of Prince Khalid bin Bandar Al Saud. They were divorced in 2000 and she married secondly, the same year, Charles Lyon Fellowes, whom she divorced in 2006.
- Lady Julia Helen Percy (born 12 November 1950). She married Nicholas Craig Harvey on 11 June 1983 and had issue.
- Henry Alan Walter Richard Percy, 11th Duke of Northumberland (1 July 1953 – 31 October 1995). Godson of Queen Elizabeth II. He succeeded his father as 11th Duke of Northumberland in 1988.
- Ralph George Algernon Percy, 12th Duke of Northumberland (born 16 November 1956). He married Jane Richard on 21 July 1979 and had issue, including Lady Catherine Percy, George, Earl Percy, and Lady Melissa Trafelet. Succeeded his brother as 12th Duke of Northumberland in 1995.
- Lady Louise Percy (25 May 1962 – 27 May 1962). Died in infancy.
- Lord James William Eustace Percy (born 18 June 1965). He married Lucy Caroline Rugge-Price in 2000 and had issue.

== Death ==
The Duke died of a heart attack at his London home, Syon House, on 11 October 1988 at the age of 74. He was succeeded as duke by his eldest son, Henry, Earl Percy, who became the 11th Duke of Northumberland. He was succeeded as Lord Steward and Chancellor of Newcastle University by the 4th Viscount Ridley, who had succeeded him as Lord Lieutenant of Northumberland four years earlier. His ashes were interred on 18 November 1988 in the Northumberland Vault at Westminster Abbey.

== Arms ==
Coat of arms of Hugh Algernon Percy, 10th Duke of Northumberland, KG, GCVO, TD, PC, JP, FRS
Coronet A Duke's Coronet Crest On a chapeau Gules turned up Ermine a lion statant tail extended Azure. Escutcheon Quarterly 1st and 4th, quarterly 1 and 4 Or a lion rampant Azure (Percy/Louvain); 2 and 3 Gules three lucies haurient Argent (Lucy); 2nd and 3rd Azure five fusils conjoined in fess Or (Percy). Supporters Dexter a lion Azure; sinister a lion guardant ducally crowned Or gorged with a collar compony Argent and Azure.

== Honours ==
- 24 April 1959: 922nd Knight Companion of the Most Noble Order of the Garter (KG)
- 1981 Birthday Honours: Knight Grand Cross of the Royal Victorian Order (GCVO)
- 9 July 1957: Knight of the Most Venerable Order of the Hospital of St John of Jerusalem (KStJ)
- 17 November 1961: Recipient of the Territorial Decoration (TD)

=== Appointments ===
- 1970: Fellow of the Royal Society of London for Improving Natural Knowledge (FRS)
- 1973: Member of Her Majesty's Most Honourable Privy Council (PC)
- Honorary Associate of the Royal College of Veterinary Surgeons

=== Military ranks ===
- (United Kingdom) 15 April 1936: Second Lieutenant, Northumberland Hussars
- (United Kingdom) 1940: Lieutenant, Royal Regiment of Artillery
- (United Kingdom) 20 June 1944: Captain, Royal Regiment of Artillery
- (United Kingdom) 28 August 1947: Captain, Northumberland Hussars

=== Honorary military appointments ===
- (United Kingdom) 25 September 1948 – 23 April 1968: Honorary Colonel of the Royal Northumberland Fusiliers
- (United Kingdom) 1 April 1967 – 1 April 1969: Honorary Colonel of the 7th (Territorial) Battalion, Royal Northumberland Fusiliers
- (United Kingdom) 1 April 1969 – 31 March 1971: Honorary Colonel of the 7th Battalion, Royal Northumberland Fusiliers
- (United Kingdom) 1 April 1971 – 31 March 1975: Deputy Honorary Colonel of the Northumbrian Volunteers
- (United Kingdom) 1 April 1975 – 11 October 1988: Honorary Colonel of the 6th (Volunteer) Battalion, Royal Regiment of Fusiliers

Honorary titles
Preceded by The Viscount Cobham	Lord Steward of the Household; 1973–1988	Succeeded by The Viscount Ridley
Preceded by The Viscount Allendale	Lord Lieutenant of Northumberland; 1956–1984	Succeeded by The Viscount Ridley
Academic offices
New university	Chancellor of the University of Newcastle upon Tyne; 1963–1988	Succeeded by The Viscount Ridley
Peerage of Great Britain
Preceded by George Percy	Duke of Northumberland; 1940–1988	Succeeded by Henry Percy
Preceded by James Stewart-Murray	Baron Percy; 1957–1988	Succeeded by Henry Percy
