= Princess Nora zu Oettingen-Spielberg =

American-German stationer (born 1990)

Princess Nora
- Lady Max Percy
- Born: 10 June 1990 (age 36); West Palm Beach, Florida, U.S.
- Spouse: Lord Max Percy (m. 2017)
- Issue: 2
Names
- Nora Amelie Claudia Christina Maria Notgera
- House: Oettingen-Spielberg (by birth); Percy (by marriage)
- Father: Albrecht Ernst, 10th Prince of Oettingen-Spielberg
- Mother: Angela Jank
- Occupation: Stationer; graphic designer

Princess Nora zu Oettingen-Oettingen und Oettingen-Spielberg, Lady Max Percy (Nora Amelie Claudia Christina Maria Notgera; born 10 June 1990) is an American-born German stationer and graphic designer. In 2013, she started a stationery business based in Germany and, in 2014, partnered with printing houses in Germany and the United Kingdom. In 2015, she launched Tusche London, a stationery company based in Notting Hill, and became co-owner and designer of the London-based stationery brand Pemberly Fox. In 2017, she married Lord Max Percy, the younger son of Ralph Percy, 12th Duke of Northumberland.

== Early life and family ==
Princess Nora of Oettingen-Spielberg was born in West Palm Beach, Florida on 10 June 1990 to Albrecht Ernst Otto Joseph Maria Notgera, 10th Prince of Oettingen-Oettingen and Oettingen-Spielberg and Angela Jank. Her father was the joint head of the Houses of Oettingen-Oettingen and Oettingen-Spielberg, formerly sovereign German principalities that were mediatized in 1806 to the Kingdom of Bavaria(the current head is her brother Franz Albrecht, 11th Prince of Öttingen-Spielberg, husband of Baroness Cleo von Adelsheim, actress and model). She is a paternal niece of psychologist Princess Gabriele of Oettingen-Spielberg. She grew up in Bavaria before moving to the United Kingdom to study history of art and design at the University of Edinburgh's College of Art.

== Career ==
In 2013 Oettingen-Spielberg started a stationery business based in Germany, designing for her brother, Franz Albrecht, Hereditary Prince of Oettingen-Spielberg. In 2014 she began working with printing houses in Germany and the United Kingdom. In January 2015 she launched her own stationery company, Tusche London, from a basement apartment in Notting Hill. Later in 2015 she became part-owner of London-based stationery brand Pemberly Fox and works as one of their designers, launching the Nora Percy Greeting Card collection.

== Personal life ==
In March 2017 Oettingen-Spielberg became engaged to Lord Max Ralph Percy, the younger son of Ralph Percy, 12th Duke of Northumberland. They married on 15 July 2017 at the Chapel of the Assumption of Mary at Schloss Hirschbrunn.

The ceremony was performed in both Catholic and Anglican rites, with two Church of England priests from St Michael's Church, Alnwick assisting with the sacrament. Oettingen-Spielberg's wedding dress was put on display at an exhibit featuring weddings from three centuries at Schloss Oettingen. The couple moved to Cape Town, South Africa in 2017.

They have two children, Romy Jane Percy, who was born on 31 July 2019 in Munich and another daughter, who was born in December 2022.

In 2018, she and her husband attended the wedding of Princess Eugenie of York and Jack Brooksbank.
