= Alnwick Garden =

Complex of formal gardens in Northumberland, England

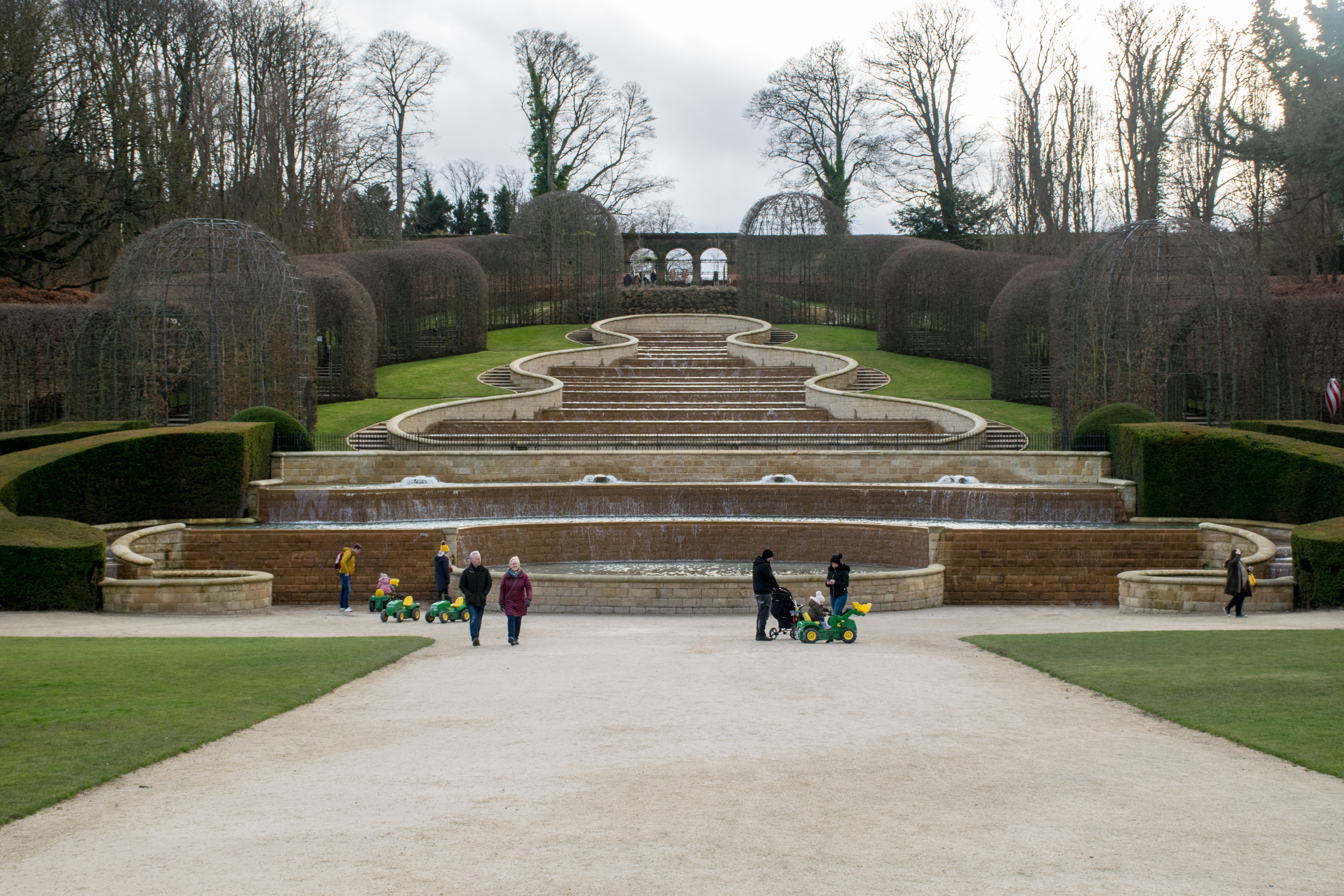
- The cascade fountain

- Location within Northumberland
- OS grid: NU190133
- Coordinates: 55.414°N 1.7°W
- Created: 1750
- Designer: Capability Brown

The Alnwick Garden is a complex of formal gardens adjacent to Alnwick Castle in the town of Alnwick, Northumberland, England. The gardens have a long history under the dukes of Northumberland, but fell into disrepair until revived at the turn of the 21st century. The garden now features various themed plantings designed around a central water cascade. The revival of the gardens led to several public disputes between the Duchess of Northumberland and various garden experts concerning preservation and the use of public funds. The garden now belongs to a charitable trust, which is separate from Northumberland Estates, although the 12th Duke of Northumberland donated the 42-acre (17 ha) site and contributed £9 million towards redevelopment costs.

A poison garden was added by the Duchess in February 2005. It features more than 100 toxic, intoxicating, and narcotic plants, and its popularity has turned the gardens into a national tourist attraction.

== History ==
The first garden was laid down in 1750 by the 1st Duke of Northumberland, who employed Capability Brown, the celebrated Northumberland gardener, to landscape the parkland adjoining Alnwick Museum.

The 3rd Duke was a plant collector, and led a century of development at Alnwick – he brought seeds from over the world, and pineapples were raised in hothouses. In the middle of the 19th century, the 4th Duke created an Italianate garden featuring a large conservatory, and at the end of the century, the gardens were at their grandest, with yew topiary, avenues of limes and acres of flowers.

During the Second World War's "Dig for Victory" campaign, the garden was turned over and provided food, and soon afterwards the austerity of the 20th century saw the garden fall into disrepair. It was closed as a working garden in 1950.

== Redevelopment ==
Redevelopment of the garden was instigated by Jane Percy, Duchess of Northumberland in 1997, and has been led by Belgian landscape designers Jacques and Peter Wirtz. It is the most ambitious new garden created in the United Kingdom since the Second World War, with a reported total development cost of £42 million.

The first phase of redevelopment, opened in October 2001, involved the creation of the cascade and initial planting of the gardens. On 22 December 2004 a large 6,000 square feet (560 m^{2}) tree house complex, including a cafe, was opened. A pavilion and visitor centre designed by Sir Michael Hopkins and Buro Happold opened in May 2006, with capacity for 1,000 people. The pavilion and visitor centre feature a barrel-vaulted gridshell roof. The gardens include several water features as well as architectural landscaping, topiary and decorative gates.

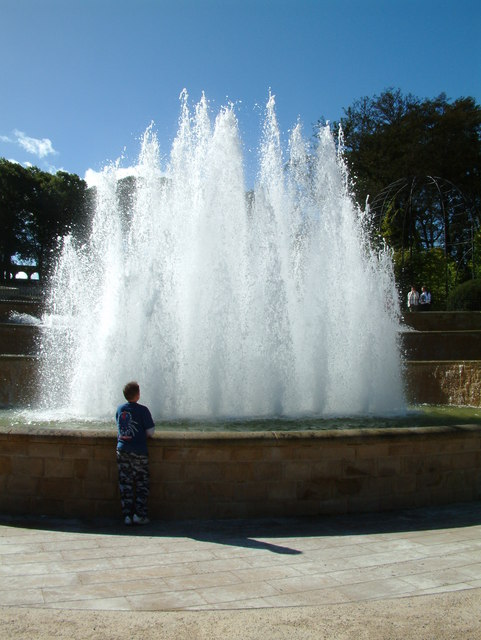
Fountain, one of several water features in the gardens

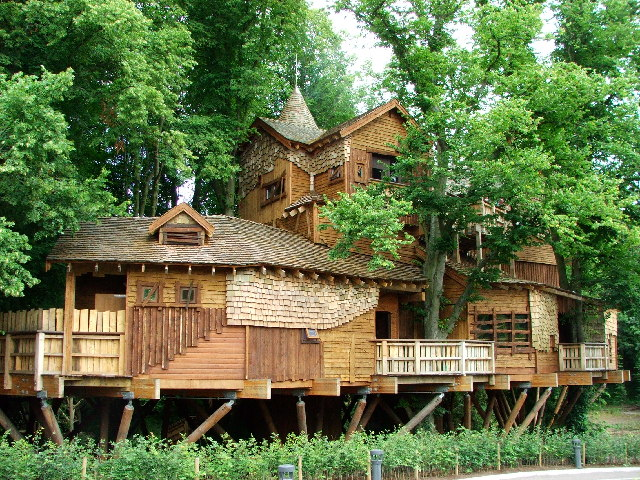
The treehouse at Alnwick Garden

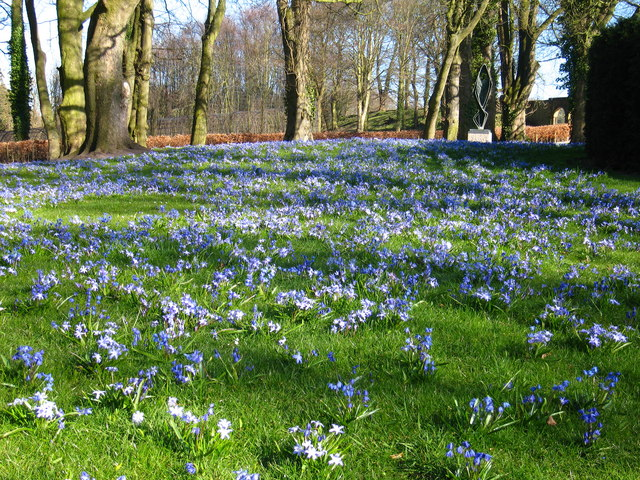
Lawn of Blue

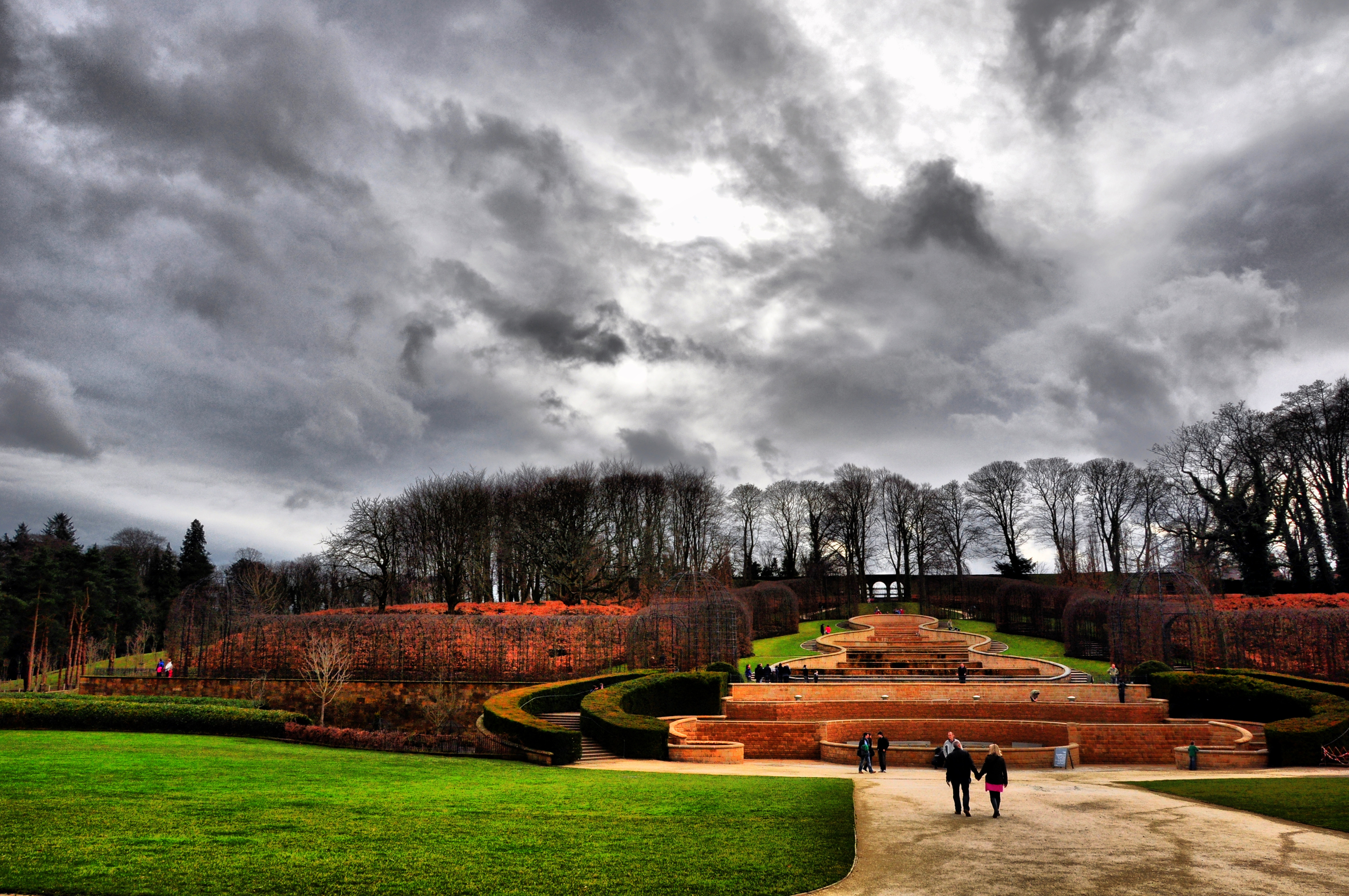
Winter vista at Alnwick Gardens

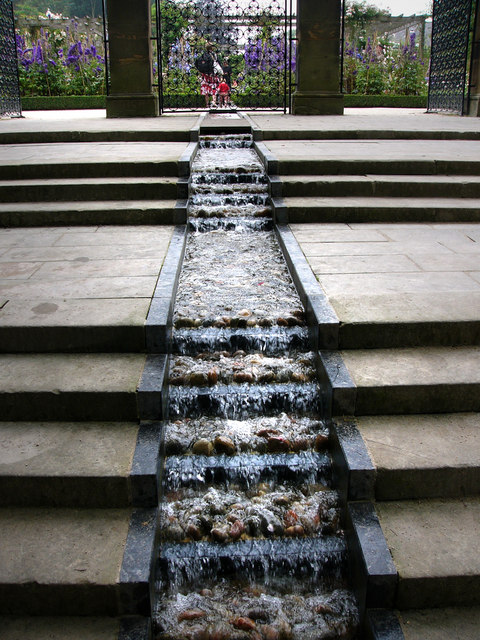
Water feature at Alnwick Garden

== Poison Garden ==
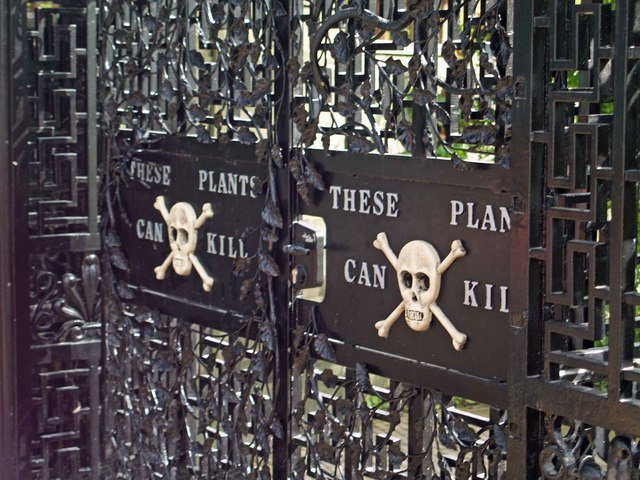
Entrance gate to the Poison Garden

A poison garden featuring intoxicating and poisonous plants was added in February 2005. The garden contains more than 100 varieties of plants. The garden was thought of by the duchess herself, who wanted the garden to have something that was different from other gardens. Species of the Poison Garden include Strychnos nux-vomica (source of strychnine), hemlock, Ricinus communis (source of harmless castor oil but also deadly ricin), foxglove, Atropa belladonna (commonly called Deadly Nightshade), Brugmansia and Laburnum. The mission of the Poison Garden also includes drug education, with featured plantings of cannabis, coca and the opium poppy Papaver somniferum. The Poison Garden has made the gardens into one of "the most unique gardens in the world" and a national tourist attraction.
