= Elizabeth Percy, Duchess of Northumberland =

Elizabeth Percy, Duchess of Northumberland may refer to:

- Elizabeth Percy, Duchess of Northumberland (1716–1776)
- Elizabeth Percy, Duchess of Northumberland (1922–2012)
