= Lady Melissa Percy =

English fashion designer (born 1987)

Lady Melissa Trafelet
- Other names: Missy Percy
- Born: Melissa Jane Percy; 20 May 1987 (age 39)
- Noble family: Percy
- Spouses: Thomas van Straubenzee (m. 2013; div. 2016) Remy White Trafelet (m. 2019)
- Issue: Bluebell Rose Trafelet; Percy Dean Trafelet; Alfred Ralph Trafelet; Ivy Trafelet
- Father: Ralph Percy, 12th Duke of Northumberland
- Mother: Jane Richard
- Occupation: Fashion designer, tennis player

Lady Melissa Jane Trafelet (née Percy, later van Straubenzee; born 20 May 1987) is an English fashion designer and former professional tennis player.

== Early life and education ==
Melissa Jane Percy was born on 20 May 1987. She is the daughter of Ralph Percy, 12th Duke of Northumberland, and the former Jane Richard. She is the younger sister of Lady Katie Percy and George Percy, Earl Percy, and the elder sister of Lord Max Percy. Lady Melissa grew up at Alnwick Castle in Northumberland. She attended Mowden Hall School, Northumberland before moving to Millfield at the age of 13, but left school when she was fourteen years old to pursue a professional tennis career, moving to the United States to attend a tennis academy. Later she completed a course at Prue Leith's cookery school.

== Career ==
=== Tennis ===
After graduating from the Cliff Drysdale Tennis Academy in the United States, she played professionally for a few years on the Women's Tennis Association circuit. When she was twenty one years old, she retired and moved back to England, coaching tennis at the Harbour Club and the Queen's Club.

=== Fashion ===
In 2016 Lady Melissa started her own women's clothing brand, Mistamina, which was incorporated in November of that year. The brand, which specialises in country living, athletic-ware, and outdoor-ware for riding, shooting, and hunting, was launched in September 2017. The brand has two collections. The second collection was launched in the summer of 2018.

== Personal life ==
Lady Melissa married Thomas van Straubenzee at St Michael's Church, Alnwick, on 22 June 2013. In 2014 the couple were subjects of a painting by Christian Furr. They divorced in March 2016 on the grounds of van Straubenzee's "unreasonable behaviour". Lady Melissa began dating American billionaire financier Remy White Trafelet in 2016. They married at Mercer Mill Plantation in Oakfield, Georgia, on 19 December 2019. On 19 February 2020 she gave birth to a daughter, named Bluebell Rose Trafelet. On 22 February 2023, she gave birth to twin sons, Percy Dean and Alfred Ralph. On 3 January 2025, she gave birth to a daughter, Ivy, in Florida.
