= Remy W. Trafelet =

American businessman and investor (born 1970)

- Born: 1970 (age 55–56)
- Education: Phillips Exeter Academy; Dartmouth College (BA)
- Occupation: Investor
- Known for: Executive Chairman of Trafelet & Company
- Spouses: Lara Schmidt (m. 2000; div. 2018) Lady Melissa Percy (m. 2019)
- Children: 7

Remy White Trafelet (born March 1970) is an American hedge fund manager and investor. He is the president and CEO of investment firm Trafelet & Company, LLC, and executive chairman of Hazeltree Treasury Solutions, a company Trafelet founded in 2011.

He is the husband of Lady Melissa Percy, whom he married in 2019.

== Early life and education ==
Trafelet graduated from Phillips Exeter Academy and earned an A.B. degree from Dartmouth College. He started his career as an analyst and portfolio manager at Fidelity Management and Research Company. In 1998 he was hired by Bowman Capital Management, running a diversified stock portfolio that netted an annualized return of 48% over two years.

== Career ==
In 1999 founded as Trafelet Capital Management which later became private investment firm Trafelet & Company, LLC, he became its president and Chief Executive Officer. Trafelet is known for his active investment strategy involving hands-on research and in-person visits to likely investment targets. He prefers a bottom-up approach to stock picking rather than top-down sector analysis.

Trafelet launched Trafelet Delta Funds in November 2000, building the firm to a peak of $6 billion in assets under management in 2006. The firm recorded a 25.1% annualized return from its inception through 2007.

The 2008 financial crisis resulted in a 26% fall in value of Trafelet's flagship fund, which was managing assets from major banks, including Merrill Lynch, Deutsche Bank, and Citigroup. While the fund outperformed major stock indices in 2008, large institutional investors were seeking liquidity. Trafelet refused to gate redemptions and the subsequent outflow left Trafelet with approximately $3 billion in managed assets by the end of 2008.

Trafelet is executive chairman of Hazeltree, a treasury solutions company he founded in 2011.

Trafelet is also the owner and operator of pecan producer Mercer Mill Pecans in the U.S. state of Georgia.

== Philanthropy and public positions ==
Trafelet is on the board of the Children's Scholarship Fund. He is President of the Trafelet Family Foundation and is on the boards of the Atlantic Salmon Federation, the National Sporting Library & Museum, and Hampden-Sydney College.

== Personal life ==
Trafelet has been married twice. On 30 September 2000, he married Lara Elizabeth Schmidt at Trinity Episcopal Church in Columbus, Ohio. They had three children, Remy, Charlotte, and Franny, before divorcing in 2018.

Trafelet married Lady Melissa Percy on 19 December 2019 at Mercer Mill Plantation in Oakfield, Georgia. The couple had their first child together, daughter Bluebell Rose Trafelet, on 19 February 2020. His wife gave birth to twin sons, Percy and Alfred, in February 2023 and daughter, Ivy, in January 2025.
