= Lord Max Percy =

British financial analyst and landowner (born 1990)

- Born: Max Ralph Percy; 26 May 1990 (age 36)
- Occupations: Investment analyst, landowner
- Spouse: Princess Nora of Oettingen-Spielberg (m. 2017)
- Children: 2
- Parents: Ralph Percy, 12th Duke of Northumberland (father); Jane Richard (mother)

Lord Max Ralph Percy (born 26 May 1990) is a British aristocrat, investment analyst and landowner. He is the younger son of Ralph Percy, 12th Duke of Northumberland.

== Early life and family ==
Percy was born on 26 May 1990 to the then Lord Ralph Percy and his wife, Jane Richard. In 1995, his father succeeded his childless brother as 12th Duke of Northumberland. Percy's mother, the Duchess of Northumberland, was appointed Lord Lieutenant of Northumberland in 2009. Percy lived at a farmhouse in Northumberland until his father became the duke, when the family moved to Alnwick Castle, Northumberland and Syon House, West London. He is the younger brother of Lady Catherine Percy, George, Earl Percy, and Lady Melissa Trafelet.

Percy attended Eton College from 2003 to 2008 and earned a business degree from the University of Edinburgh in 2013.

== Sale of Rothbury ==
In July 2023, Percy listed Rothbury, his 9,500-acre Northumberland estate, for sale at £35 million. It is the largest landsale to take place in England in three decades. The estate has been in the Percy family since 1332; prior to that it belonged to the English monarch. It includes twenty-three residential properties, the Crown and Thistle Pub in Alwinton, twelve farms, a caravan site, a river for trout and salmon fishing, 1,800 acres of woodland and the Simonside Hills. The rent from the estate's farms brings in an annual income of £283,000 a year.

Percy's decision to sell Rothbury was met with protest by some residents of the estate, who argue that it should be given "back to the people". Steven Bridgett, a member of the Northumberland County Council, criticized the proposed sale claiming he feared the land would be bought by someone with "more money than sense" and voiced concern that the land would be sold off to international corporations.

== Personal life ==
On 15 July 2017, he married Princess Nora of Oettingen-Spielberg, daughter of Albrecht Ernst, 10th Prince of Oettingen-Spielberg, in a religious ceremony at Schloss Hirschbrunn in Bavaria. They have two children: Romy Jane Percy, who was born on 31 July 2019 in Munich, and another daughter, who was born in December 2022.

He is close to the British royal family and attended the wedding of Prince William of Wales and Catherine Middleton in 2011 and the wedding of Princess Eugenie of York and Jack Brooksbank in 2018.
