= Auhausen =

- Municipality
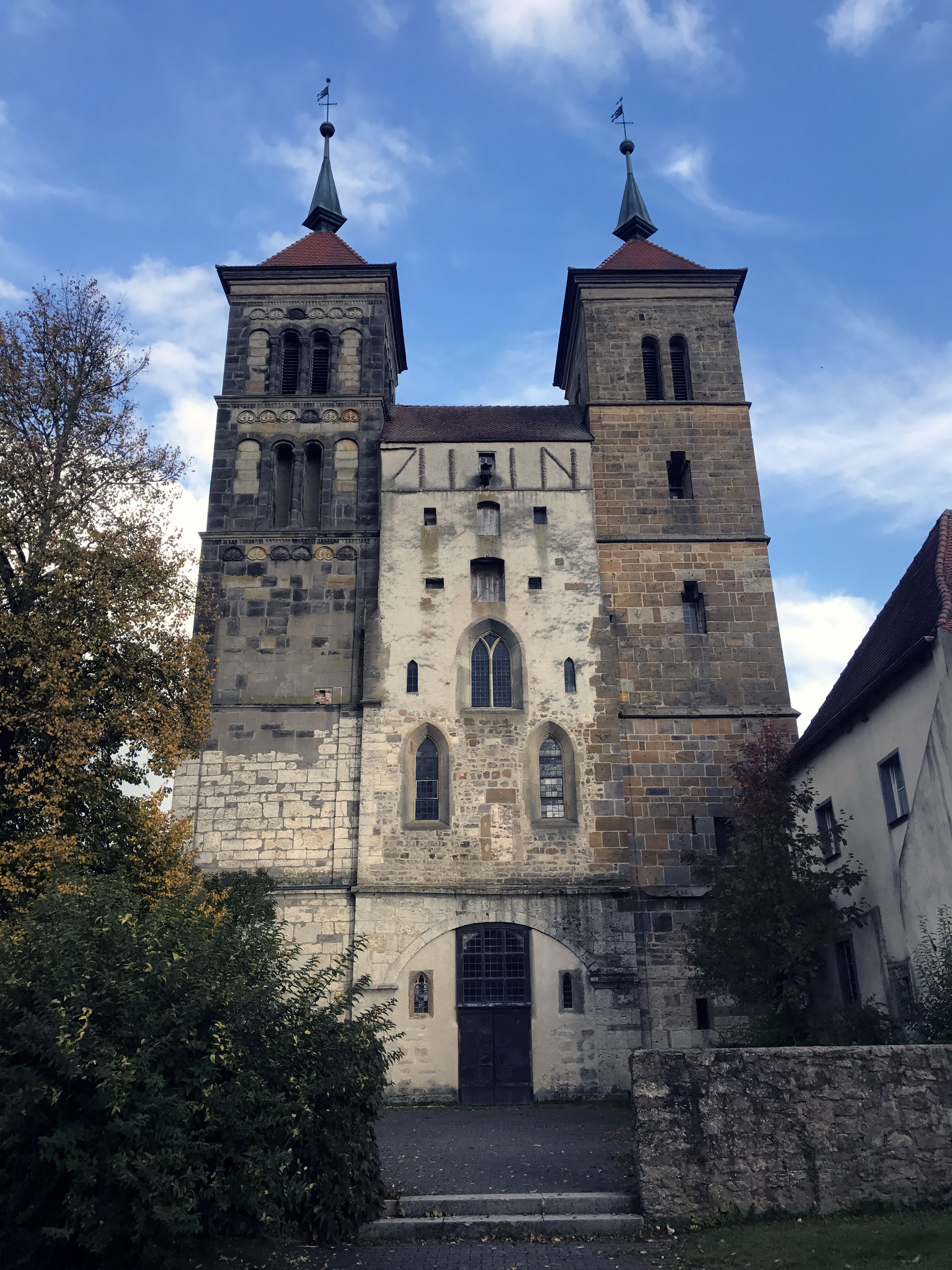
- Church of Saints Mary and Godehard at the former monastery at Auhausen

- Coat of arms

- Location of Auhausen within Donau-Ries district
- Interactive map of Auhausen
- Location within Germany Location within Bavaria
- Coordinates: 48°1′N 10°38′E
- Country: Germany
- State: Bavaria
- Admin. region: Schwaben
- District: Donau-Ries
- Municipal assoc.: Oettingen in Bayern

Government
  - Mayor (2020–26): Martin Weiß

Area
  - Total: 15.55 km^{2} (6.00 sq mi)
- Elevation: 422 m (1,385 ft)

Population (2025-12-31)
  - Total: 1,055
  - Density: 67.85/km^{2} (175.7/sq mi)
- Time zone: UTC+01:00 (CET)
  - Summer (DST): UTC+02:00 (CEST)
- Postal codes: 86736
- Dialling codes: 09832
- Vehicle registration: DON
- Website: www.auhausen.de

Auhausen is a municipality in the Swabian district Donau-Ries in Bavaria in Germany. The municipality is within the Oettingen central administrative body. Auhausen was the site of the 1608 meeting that formed the Protestant Union, also known as the Union of Auhausen. Schloss Hirschbrunn, a castle owned by the House of Oettingen-Spielberg, is in Auhausen.
