= George Percy, Earl Percy =

British heir apparent (born 1984)

George Percy
- Earl Percy
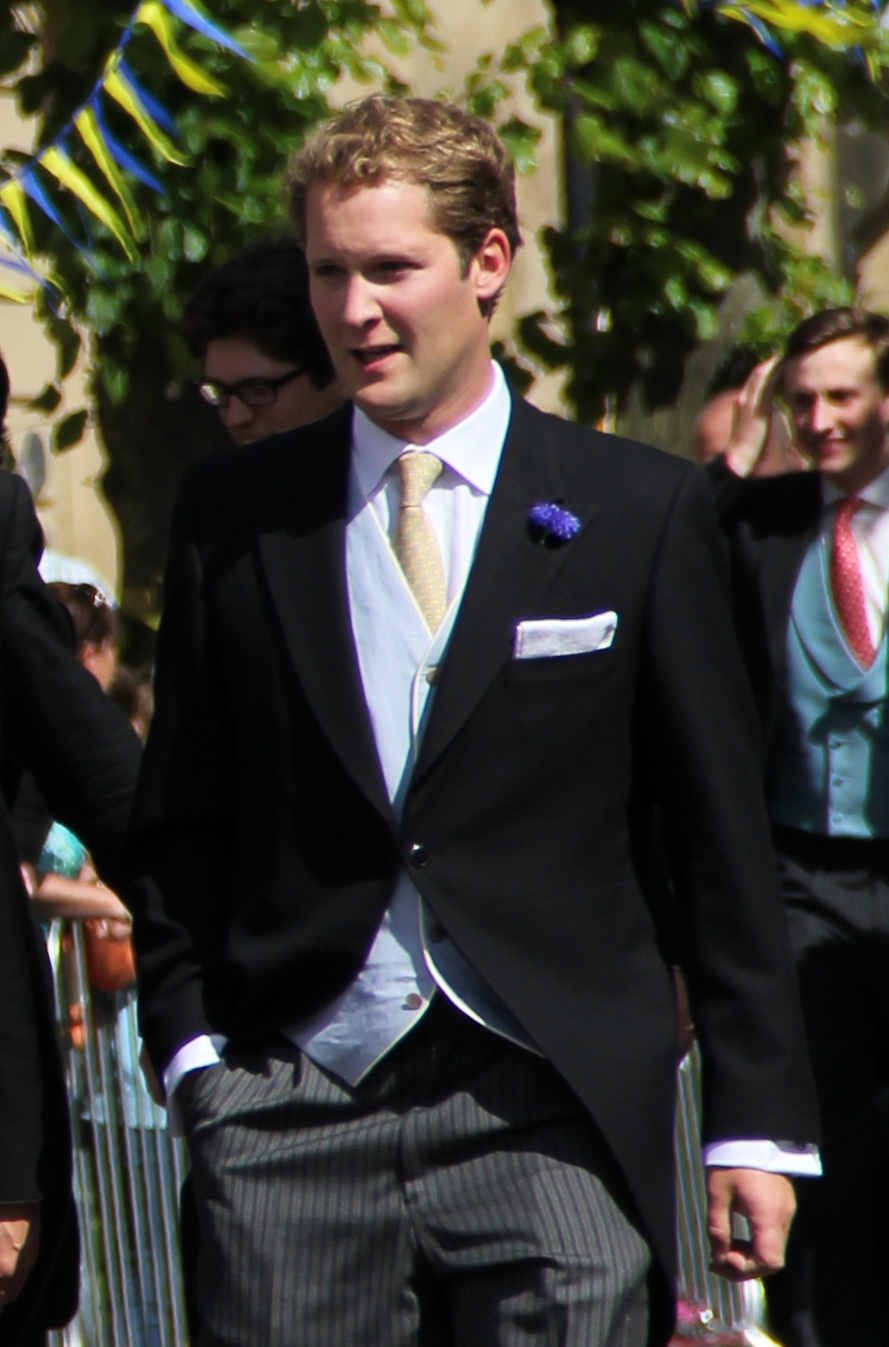
- Earl Percy at the wedding of his sister, Lady Melissa, in June 2013
- Born: George Dominic Percy; 4 May 1984 (age 42); United Kingdom
- Noble family: Percy
- Father: Ralph Percy, 12th Duke of Northumberland
- Mother: Jane Richard
- Occupation: Businessman

George Dominic Percy, Earl Percy (born 4 May 1984), is a British businessman and the heir apparent to the Dukedom of Northumberland.

== Early life ==
Percy was born as the second child and elder son of Ralph Percy, 12th Duke of Northumberland and his wife, the former Jane Richard. He is a younger brother of Lady Katie Percy and an older brother of Lady Melissa Percy and Lord Max Percy. He became heir apparent to the dukedom in October 1995, when his uncle Henry, 11th Duke of Northumberland, died. Percy's parents, now Duke and Duchess of Northumberland, were eager to protect him from "vices and pitfalls", and they filed a lawsuit to prevent him from inheriting £1 million and a £350,000 annual income upon turning 18. In 1999, they succeeded in delaying the inheritance, which Percy received at the age of 25. Percy is also set to inherit Alnwick Castle.

== Education and career ==
At the age of 12, Percy served as a page of honour to Elizabeth II at the 1996 State Opening of Parliament.

Percy was educated at Eton College, then studied geography at the University of Edinburgh, specialising in sustainable development and renewable energy. He graduated in 2007, having shared a house with Pippa Middleton, with whom he was subsequently linked.

Percy studied Arabic language at the University of Damascus, and later worked on development projects in the Middle East, including Abu Dhabi. He is the CEO of Hotspur Geothermal (formerly Cluff Geothermal), a British geothermal energy company, where Paul Younger (d. 2018) was the Technical Director.

As old family friends, Percy and his family attended the wedding of Pippa Middleton's sister, Catherine, and Prince William, Duke of Cambridge, in 2011.

Orders of precedence in the United Kingdom
Preceded by Viscount Mandeville	Gentlemen	Succeeded by Marquess of Douro
