= Lady Katie Percy =

English gunsmith and mechanic (born 1982)

- Born: Catherine Sarah Percy; 23 June 1982 (age 44)
- Noble family: Percy
- Spouse: Patrick Valentine (m. 2011; div. 2014)
- Father: Ralph Percy, 12th Duke of Northumberland
- Mother: Jane Richard
- Occupation: Gunsmith, mechanic

Lady Catherine Sarah Percy (formerly Valentine; born 23 June 1982) is an English gunsmith and mechanic. She served as the chief mechanic for Marquass Motorcycles before starting her own firearm manufacturing business.

== Early life ==
Lady Katie Percy was born on 23 June 1982. She is the daughter of Ralph Percy, 12th Duke of Northumberland and Jane Percy, Duchess of Northumberland and grew up at Alnwick Castle. She is the older sister of George Percy, Earl Percy, Lady Melissa Percy, and Lord Max Percy.

== Career ==
Percy started working as a mechanic on vintage cars and bikes in the early 2000s, enrolling in a three-year mechanic course for certification. She was chief mechanic for Marquass Motorcycles, appointed by company founder Ben Whately. After working as a mechanic she trained with James Purdey & Sons, the royal gunmakers, and set up her own business making stocks for sporting guns.

== Personal life ==
On 26 February 2011 Percy married Patrick Valentine at St Michael's Church, Alnwick. A man named Michael McNamara sent letters to Percy prior to her wedding, allegedly threatening to crash the ceremony. The situation was dealt with by the British police. In 2014 Percy and Valentine divorced.

In 2015 Percy began a relationship with businessman Mark Carnegie.
