= Elizabeth Percy, Duchess of Northumberland (1922–2012) =

British peeress and Women's Royal Naval Service officer

Her Grace The Duchess of Northumberland CStJ
- Born: Lady Elizabeth Diana Montagu Douglas Scott; 20 January 1922
- Died: 19 September 2012 (aged 90); Albury, Surrey, United Kingdom
- Resting place: Northumberland Vault, Westminster Abbey
- Spouse: Hugh Percy, 10th Duke of Northumberland (m. 1946; died 1988)
- Children: 7; including Henry Percy, 11th Duke of Northumberland, and Ralph Percy, 12th Duke of Northumberland
- Parents: Walter Montagu Douglas Scott, 8th Duke of Buccleuch (father); Mary Lascelles (mother)

Elizabeth Diana Percy, Duchess of Northumberland CStJ (born Lady Elizabeth Diana Montagu Douglas Scott; 20 January 1922 – 19 September 2012), was a British peeress and Women's Royal Naval Service officer during World War II.

== Early life ==
Lady Elizabeth Diana Montagu Douglas Scott was born on 20 January 1922 to Walter Montagu Douglas Scott, Earl of Dalkeith, later 8th Duke of Buccleuch, and his wife, Mary Lascelles. Her paternal aunt was Princess Alice, Duchess of Gloucester.

She grew up at Eildon Hall in the Scottish Borders. After the death of her paternal grandfather in 1935, the family resided at Drumlanrig Castle, Bowhill House and Boughton House. She was educated at home before being sent to Germany, Italy and France to study languages. She was a bridesmaid at the 1935 wedding of her aunt Alice to Prince Henry, Duke of Gloucester.

Lady Elizabeth was a debutante during the 1939 season, the last before the war, being interviewed in the May 2001 Timewatch episode 'Debutantes'.

== World War II ==
Lady Elizabeth served with the Civil Nursing Reserve, working at a military hospital in Dumfries. She later joined the Women's Royal Naval Service (WRNS) and saw action aboard the Mauretania, before being posted to Australia. She was promoted to the rank of Acting Third Officer on 13 October 1944 and confirmed in the rank on 19 October 1945.

== Marriage and issue ==
On 12 June 1946, she married Hugh Percy, 10th Duke of Northumberland at Westminster Abbey. Guests included King George VI and Queen Elizabeth, Queen Mary, Princess Elizabeth and Princess Margaret. Upon marriage, she became the Duchess of Northumberland.

They had seven children:

- Lady Caroline Mary Percy (born 3 May 1947), married Pierre, Comte de Cabarrus, and had issue. They were later divorced.
- Lady Victoria Lucy Diana Percy (born 19 April 1949), married John Aiden Cuthbert in 1975 and had issue. They were divorced before 2000, and she married, secondly, Charles Timothy Lyon Fellowes in 2000.
- Lady Julia Helen Percy (born 12 November 1950), married Nicholas Robert Craig Harvey on 11 June 1983 and had issue.
- Henry Alan Walter Richard Percy, 11th Duke of Northumberland (1 July 1953 – 31 October 1995).
- Ralph George Algernon Percy, 12th Duke of Northumberland (born 16 November 1956), married Isobel Jane Richard and has issue
- Lady Louise Percy (25 May 1962 – 27 May 1962)
- Lord James William Eustace Percy (b. 18 June 1965), married Lucy Caroline Rugge-Price in 2000 and has issue.

== Later life ==
After her marriage, she resided at Alnwick Castle in Northumberland. In 1963, Queen Elizabeth II asked her to entertain visiting foreign royals for the wedding of Princess Alexandra and Angus Ogilvy at her London home, Syon House. As duchess, she was involved in a number of local charity organizations. On 30 January 1986, she was appointed a commander of the Most Venerable Order of the Hospital of St John of Jerusalem.

After the death of her husband in 1988, she took on the role of honorary colonel of the Royal Northumberland Fusiliers.

She died on 19 September 2012. Her funeral took place at the Old Church of St. Peter and St. Paul, Albury Park, Guildford, Surrey, on 1 October 2012. Among those present were her cousin Prince Richard, Duke of Gloucester, and Birgitte, Duchess of Gloucester. A memorial service was held on 5 November 2012 at St Michael's Church, Alnwick. Her ashes were interred in the Northumberland Vault at Westminster Abbey.
