= Ralph Percy, 12th Duke of Northumberland =

English peer (born 1956)

His Grace The Duke of Northumberland
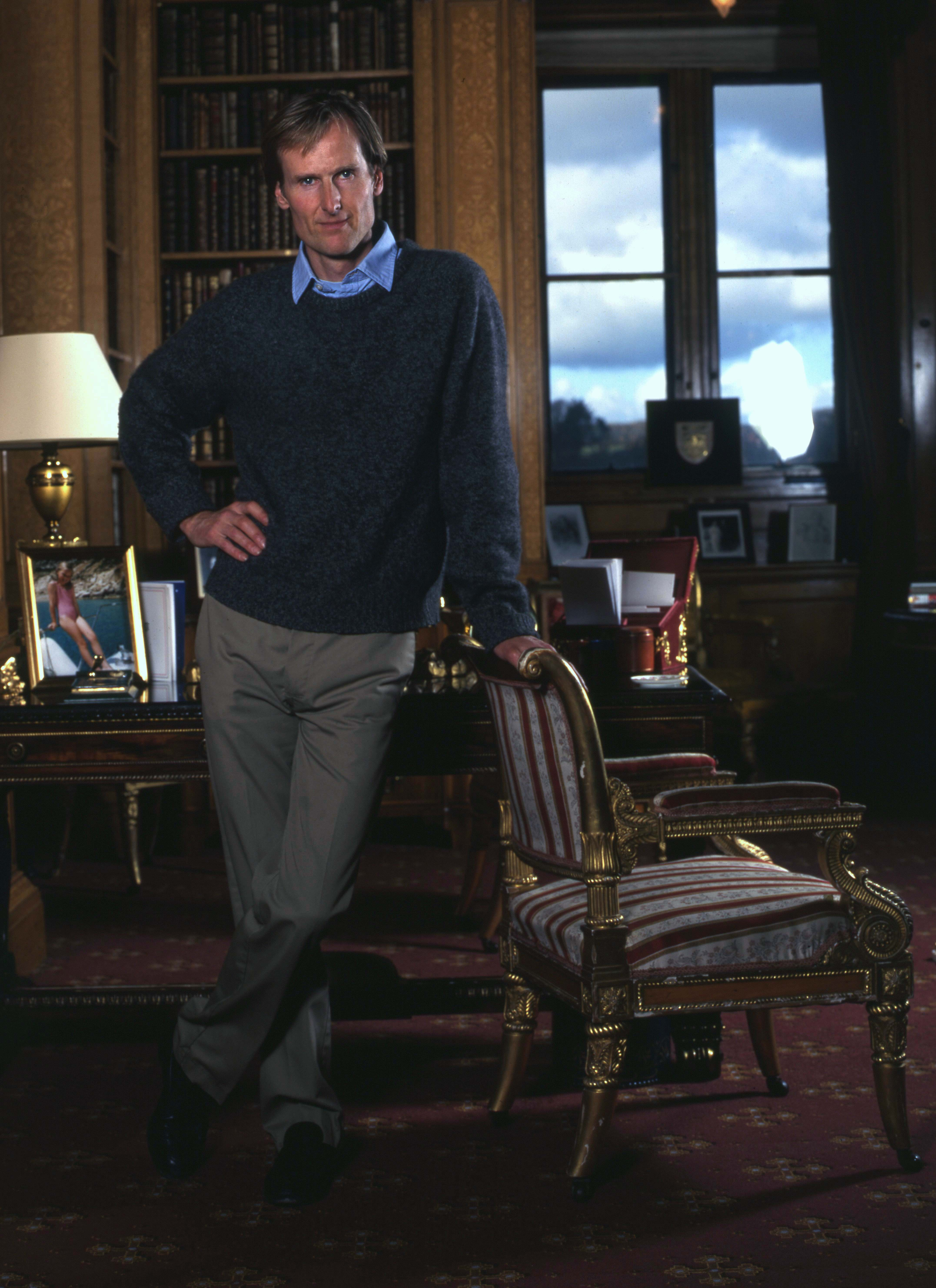
- Portrait by Allan Warren, 1997
- Born: Ralph George Algernon Percy; 16 November 1956 (age 69); Alnwick, Northumberland
- Predecessor: Henry Percy
- Spouse: Jane Richard (m. 1979)
- Children: Lady Catherine Percy; George Percy, Earl Percy; Lady Melissa Trafelet; Lord Max Percy
- Parent(s): Hugh Percy, 10th Duke of Northumberland; Lady Elizabeth Montagu Douglas Scott

Ralph George Algernon Percy, 12th Duke of Northumberland, DL (born 16 November 1956), styled Lord Ralph Percy until 1995, is a British hereditary peer and rural landowner and head of the House of Percy.

== Early life ==
Ralph Percy was born at Alnwick Castle, the fifth child and second son of Hugh Percy, 10th Duke of Northumberland, and the former Lady Elizabeth Montagu Douglas Scott, daughter of the 8th Duke of Buccleuch. His maternal first cousin is Richard Scott, 10th Duke of Buccleuch, one of the largest private landowners in Scotland, while his paternal first cousin was Angus Douglas-Hamilton, 15th Duke of Hamilton, who was the premier peer of Scotland. His first cousins once removed are Prince Richard, Duke of Gloucester and the late Prince William of Gloucester, members of the British royal family.

Percy was educated at Eton College, Christ Church, Oxford, where he graduated in modern history, and University of Reading, where he studied land management. He worked in the Arundel Castle estate office for seven years, before moving back to Northumberland to manage the Alnwick estate for his elder brother Henry, the 11th Duke.

== Duke ==
Ralph Percy succeeded in the dukedom in 1995 on the death of his brother the 11th duke, who had no children. As such, he was a member of the House of Lords until the passing of the House of Lords Act 1999 ended the right of hereditary peers to sit in the House. Hansard records no contributions to House of Lords work by Northumberland.

The Duke assists in managing Northumberland Estates (the corporation holding the ducal assets) which has many venture subsidiaries and associated trusts, which altogether own land and property in Northumberland, Scotland and to a lesser extent London, Surrey and Tyneside. Ralph Percy was ranked at number 285 in the Sunday Times Rich List 2024, with an estimated wealth of £509 million. He or the corporation is the owner of Alnwick Castle, an ancestral ducal seat, as well as Warkworth Castle and Prudhoe Castle in Northumberland; Syon House and Syon Park in London; Hulne Park and Hulne Priory at Alnwick; Albury Park in Surrey, and other listed buildings such as Brizlee Tower. Northumberland Estates manages 100,000 acres (400 km^{2}): directly managing 4,000 acres (16 km^{2}) of forestry and 20,000 acres (81 km^{2}) of farmland, with approximately 100 tenant farmers managing the remaining bulk of the land.

The 12th Duke's sale on the open market, rather than at a lower price to The National Gallery, of Raphael's Madonna of the Pinks in 2003 was subject to some criticism. At much the same time, in response to a foot-and-mouth disease crisis, the Duke cut the rents of tenant farmers by 10 percent. The Duke has shown opposition to certain wind farms. However, he adopted renewable energy in the restoration of a hydroelectric power generator. The Duke is a sponsor of the NCEA Duke's Secondary School.

On 8 April 2014, despite the vast wealth of the estate, the estate's management announced the date of a new art sale to raise £15 million to cover the costs of the Newburn flood caused by the failure of a culvert for which it was responsible on 25 September 2012. The sales were completed by Sotheby's in July 2014.

In 2015 the Percy family outraged users of allotments in Hounslow, West London, when they revoked a lease which had existed since the First World War, with the intent of developing the land for profit. The development plans were rejected by the planning Inspectorate in 2023 on grounds it would harm heritage assets.

== Marriage and children ==
Percy married Jane Richard on 21 July 1979 at Traquair Parish Church in Scotland. They have four children:

- Lady Catherine Sarah "Katie" Percy (born 23 June 1982), a gunsmith and mechanic
- George Dominic Percy, Earl Percy (born 4 May 1984), heir apparent to the dukedom and managing director of energy company Hotspur Geothermal
- Lady Melissa Jane Percy (born 20 May 1987); a fashion designer and former professional tennis player; married with four children
- Lord Max Percy (born 26 May 1990), financial analyst, husband of Princess Nora zu Oettingen-Spielberg; married with two daughters

== Arms ==
Coat of arms of Ralph Percy, 12th Duke of Northumberland
Coronet A Coronet of a Duke Crest On a Chapeau Gules turned up Ermine a Lion statant with tail extended Azure Escutcheon Quarterly: 1st and 4th grandquarters: 1st and 4th counterquartered: 1st and 4th, Or a Lion rampant Azure (Brabant and Lovaine); 2nd and 3rd, Gules three Lucies hauriant Argent (Lucy); 2nd and 3rd, Azure five Fusils conjoined in fess Or (Percy); 2nd and 3rd grandquarters: quarterly: 1st and 4th, Or three Bars wavy Gules (Drummond); 2nd and 3rd, Or a Lion's Head erased within a Double Tressure flory counterflory Gules (Drummond, coat of augmentation) Supporters Dexter: a Lion rampant Azure; Sinister: a Lion rampant guardant Or ducally crowned of the last gorged with a Collar company Argent and Azure Motto Esperance en Dieu (Hope in God)

Peerage of Great Britain
Preceded by Henry Percy	Duke of Northumberland; 1995–present	Incumbent
Orders of precedence in the United Kingdom
Preceded by The Duke of Manchester	Gentlemen; The Duke of Northumberland	Succeeded by The Duke of Leinster
