= NCEA Duke's Secondary School =

Location
- Ashington, Northumberland; England; 55.1758°N 1.5477°W

Information
- Type: Academy
- Religious affiliation: Church of England
- Established: 2009 (mergers)
- Local authority: Northumberland
- Trust: Northumberland Church of England Academy Trust UID:17043
- Department for Education URN: 135886 Tables
- Ofsted: Reports
- Chair: Carole Snelling
- Executive Director: Russ Atkinson
- Gender: Coeducational
- Age: 11 to 19
- Enrolment: 909 As of February 2020
- Capacity: 1155
- Website: dukes.ncea.org.uk

The NCEA Duke's Secondary School is an 11–19 academy in Ashington, Northumberland, England. It is part of the Northumberland Church of England Trust occupying the Josephine Butler Campus of its predecessor, The Northumberland Church of England Academy, which was an all-through school spread out across six campuses in southeastern Northumberland.

== History ==
The school was founded in September 2009, replacing Hirst High School and nine primary school sites in the Ashington, Newbiggin-by-the-Sea and Lynemouth area of Northumberland.

The new Josephine Butler Campus was handed over to the academy by Kier Construction and Northumberland County Council on 2 March 2012, moving secondary, primary and special needs students into one building with the exception of the Thomas Bewick, William Leech, Grace Darling and James Knott campuses, which will stay at their current location. The Centre [Special Educational Needs unit] includes the SEN pupils from Abbeyfields First School in Morpeth which is also located in the Josephine Butler Campus.

£48 million was spent on the new academy. Of the sum, £2 million has come from the county council with the DfE and other grants funding the remainder. Funding was also provided by the Anglican Diocese of Newcastle and the Duke of Northumberland (represented by Northumberland Estates).

In 2013 the Northumberland Church of England Academy was an all through academy of 2,700 students based on six campuses in Ashington, Newbiggin and Lynemouth. It comprises five primary school campuses for learners aged 3 to 11, a secondary campus, the Josephine Butler Campus for learners aged 11 to 19 and a 100-place centre for students with profound and/or multiple learning difficulties or with severe learning difficulties. 10% of students were not of White British origin. The number eligible for pupil premium funding was well above average. (Note: The pupil premium is an additional sum of money provided by the government to support children in the care of the local authority, those known to be eligible for free school meals and the children of military personnel.) and the proportion with a statement of special educational need much higher than the national average.

== Ofsted ==
Ofsted assessed the school in 2013 and declared it "requires improvement". It found that though parents and students were supportive and primary aged children were getting a better deal, there were weaknesses elsewhere. They judged that the governors were ineffective, and leadership was inconsistent. The said that planning at all levels of leadership was not focused sharply enough on the need to raise achievement in English and mathematics. They also criticised variable quality teaching and the behavior of some pupils.

Since then the school has been monitored in 2014, and inspected in 2015 and 2017 and in all cases the school was found to be requiring improvements. Following the 2017 inspection, the controlling trust separated out the various units, to become stand alone schools. The special needs unit became Castle School, and the secondary section, based at the Josephine Butler Campus became the NCEA Duke's Secondary School. This became an 11–19 mixed ability, secondary school with sixth form – it has separate governance and structures.

== Academics ==
In the first three years, (Key Stage 3). The trust balances the need to fulfill the National Curriculum with the principles of the Church of England. Some pupils enter the academy with low literacy and numeracy skill. The curriculum complies with the statutory obligations to provide courses in National Curriculum subjects: English, Mathematics, Science, History, World Studies (Geography) French, Healthy Living (DT), ICT, Art, Music, Drama and P.E., together with Religious Education.

The government promotes EBacc subjects as a way to create an academic core curriculum in Key Stage 4. (Note: The EBacc was introduced into schools in England by the government in the expectation that the majority of children will work towards GCSEs in five core academic subjects:English, Mathematics, Science, History or Geography, and a language.) The Duke's Secondary School provides a broad and balanced curriculum to meet the needs and aspirations of all pupils. It is built round a core of academic subjects, and option blocks enable a wider personalised curriculum of academic, creative and vocational subjects to be created. Core is Maths, English Language, English Literature and Science.

There are a number of elements of the Key Stage 4 curriculum that are core provision, but do not lead to external accreditation. However, the full programme of study that pupils follow is valuable for their future, and includes Religious Studies (RS); Personal, Social, Health and Careers Education (PSHCE); ICT; and Physical Education (PE). Students select 3 options from a selection of GCSE and BTEC level 1 courses.

The sixth form is known as JBVI. Students are guided into Level 3 and Level 2 pathways largely on their Attainment 8 score. They have four option columns; vocational studies feature strongly: These courses are offered:

Level 3 academic (A levels)
Art and Design, Biology, Core Maths, ASDAN EPQ, Psychology, Sociology
Level 3 Vocational
Creative Media (single), Health & Social Care (double), ICT (double), Science (single), Sport (double))
Level 2 Courses
Business Enterprise, Childcare, Hospitality & Catering, ICT, Personal Development, PHSE

There is a fifth option column where a range of AS levels and lower level vocational topics can be attempted by the student. There is also an extra-curricular offer.

== See also ==
- Josephine Butler-
