= Jane Percy, Duchess of Northumberland =

British noblewoman (born 1958)

Her Grace The Duchess of Northumberland DCVO
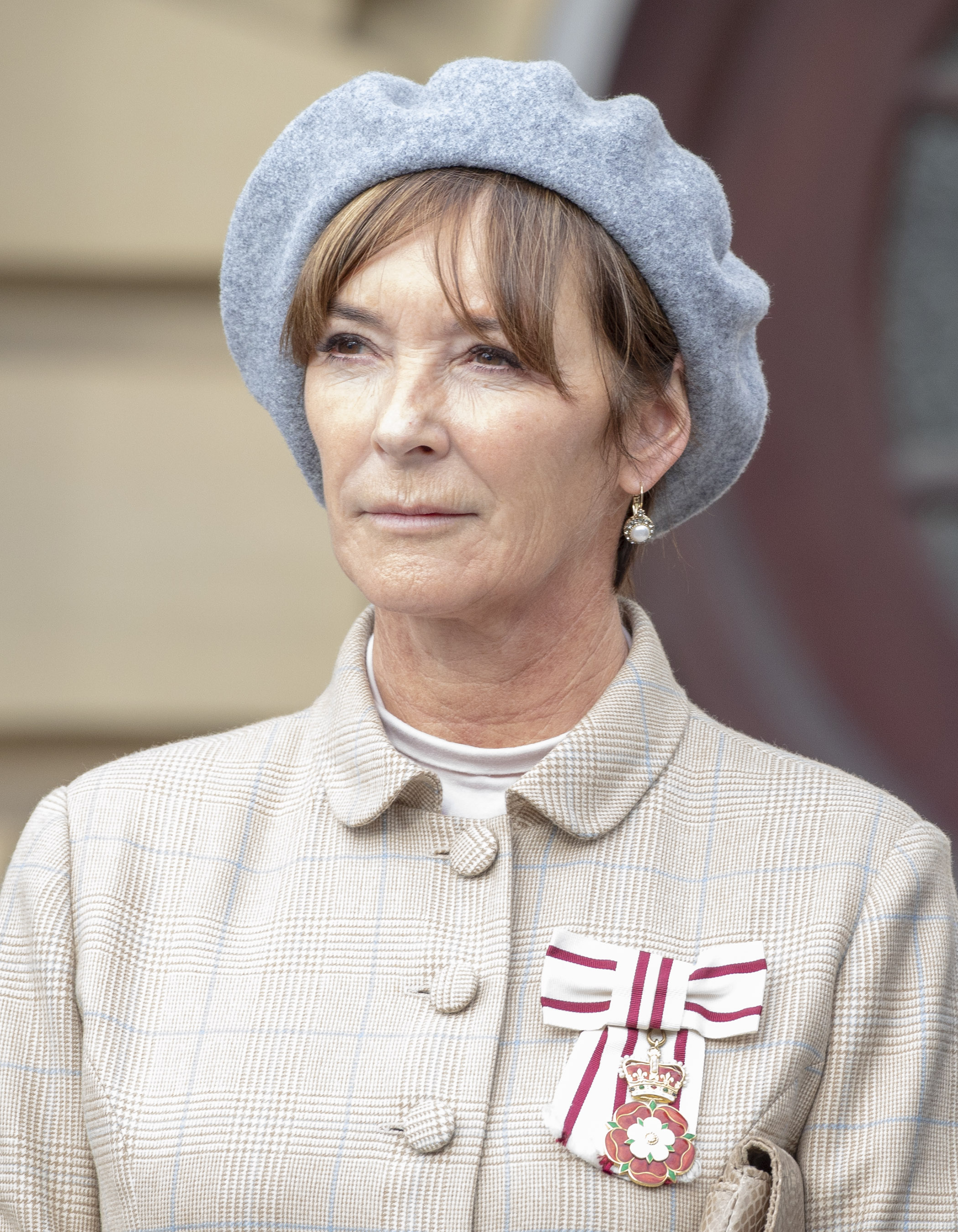
- The Duchess officiating at a Battle of Britain parade in Alnwick, September 2018

Lord Lieutenant of Northumberland
- In office 12 May 2009 – 1 May 2024
- Monarchs: Elizabeth II; Charles III
- Preceded by: Sir John Riddell
- Succeeded by: Dr Caroline Pryer

Personal details
- Born: Isobel Jane Miller Richard; 11 May 1958 (age 68) Edinburgh, Scotland
- Spouse: Ralph Percy, 12th Duke of Northumberland (m. 1979)
- Children: Lady Katie Percy; George Percy, Earl Percy; Lady Melissa Percy; Lord Max Percy
- Parent(s): John Richard; Angela, Lady Buchan-Hepburn
- Net worth: ▲£315 million

Isobel Jane Miller Percy, Duchess of Northumberland, DCVO (née Richard; born 11 May 1958), is a British aristocrat and businesswoman. She served as Lord Lieutenant of Northumberland from 2009 to 2024, and is best known for redeveloping the Alnwick Garden at Alnwick Castle. She was the first woman to serve as Lord Lieutenant of Northumberland. Her husband, Ralph, is the 12th Duke of Northumberland.

== Early life ==
Jane Richard was born in Edinburgh in 1958. She is one of four children of the stockbroker John Richard (1933–2003), as well as sororal grandniece of the all-round sportsman Max Woosnam. Her mother, Angela, Lady Buchan-Hepburn (née Scott), was the owner of Kailzie Gardens, an income-generating family garden located in the Scottish Borders. Her parents divorced in the early 1970s and both remarried; her stepmother Christine was a Conservative group leader on the City of Edinburgh Council, while her stepfather was Sir Ninian Buchan-Hepburn, 6th Baronet (1922–1992).

As a child, Jane Richard helped her mother maintain Kailzie Gardens and aspired to become a champion figure-skater, practicing for the Scottish Junior Championships at Murrayfield Ice Rink. She quit when she was 13 and was enrolled at Cobham Hall School in Kent.

== Marriage ==
At the age of 16, Jane Richard met the 17-year-old Lord Ralph Percy at his cousin's birthday party, and later followed him to Oxford, where he attended Christ Church, Oxford at the University of Oxford, and she took a secretarial course. They married on 21 July 1979 at Traquair Parish Church, despite, now aged 21, being deemed too young by their parents. The pair have four children: Katie (b. 23 June 1982), a gun-maker, motorcycle mechanic and racing driver; George (b. 4 May 1984), the heir apparent to the dukedom; Melissa (b. 20 May 1987), a fashion designer and former professional tennis player; and Max (b. 26 May 1990), an investment analyst.

The couple lived in a farmhouse in Northumberland until 1995, when Lord Ralph's brother Henry, 11th Duke of Northumberland, died from heart failure after an overdose of amphetamines, and Ralph succeeded to the dukedom. As old family friends, the Duke and Duchess attended the wedding of Prince William and Catherine Middleton.

== Entrepreneurship ==
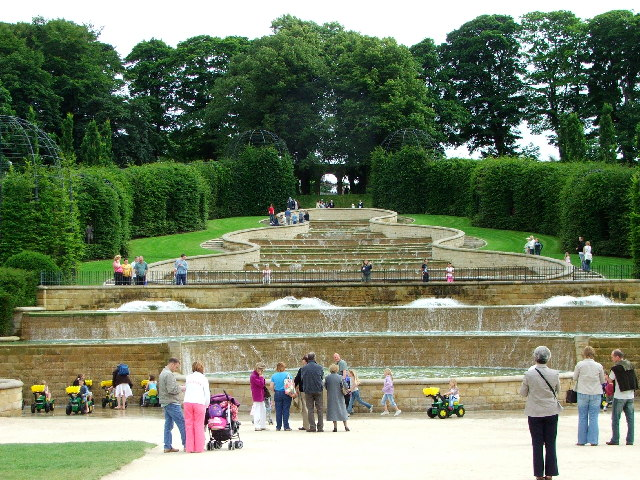
The cascade fountain in the Alnwick Garden

The Duchess was unhappy in her ducal role until her husband suggested that she should renovate the Alnwick Garden, a large ornamental garden at the family seat, Alnwick Castle. She started the work on the garden in 2000, and turned it into one of North East England's biggest visitor attractions, as well as one of the country's most controversial ones. In 2003, the garden became a charitable trust separate from her husband's estate, with the Duchess as a fundraiser and one of six trustees. In 2005, she introduced the Poison Garden to the estate gardens.

A practicing martial arts enthusiast, she introduced cage boxing to the Alnwick Gardens and a range of cocktails named after her. The Duchess, who claims to defy tradition, has received praise and scorn for the Alnwick Gardens, but has dismissed criticism as "the snobbery element of gardening". The locals welcomed the restoration and the influx of tourists, while English Heritage accused the Duchess of destroying one of the greatest gardens in England. In 2004, she was hospitalised after collapsing under pressure, and the criticism made her consider resigning the trusteeship and giving up on the project.

In 2012, the Duchess announced her plan to finish reconstruction of the Alnwick Garden by May 2015. She made arrangements enabling her then to step down from managing it and for the visitor attraction to be franchised out to an external management company. She also arranged for a series of books and titles to be brought out based on the Alnwick Castle archive covering aspects of the life and history of the Percy family estate.

== Honours and honorific appointments ==
On 12 May 2009, having been recommended by Prime Minister Gordon Brown, she was appointed Lord Lieutenant of Northumberland by Queen Elizabeth II. The post was once held by her father-in-law Hugh, 10th Duke, and eleven other members of the Percy family, but the Duchess is the first woman to receive this distinction. She was, in 2011, patron of 160 charities. On 9 April 2024 it was announced she would step down from the Lord-lieutenancy with effect from 1 May 2024, being succeeded by Caroline Pryer, a retired headteacher.

In the 2024 King's Birthday Honours, she was appointed a Dame Commander of the Royal Victorian Order (DCVO) for her service as lord-lieutenant.

== Publications ==
- The Poison Diaries, ISBN 978-0-00-736285-1
- Alnwick Castle, The Home of the Duke and Duchess of Northumberland (2012) by James McDonald, foreword by The Duchess of Northumberland, ISBN 978-0-7112-3237-2

Honorary titles
Preceded by Sir John Riddell	Lord Lieutenant of Northumberland; 2009–2024	Succeeded by Caroline Pryer
Orders of precedence in the United Kingdom
Preceded by The Duchess of Manchester	Ladies	Followed by The Duchess of Leinster
