= Duke of Northumberland =

Dukedom in the Peerage of Great Britain

Dukedom of Northumberland
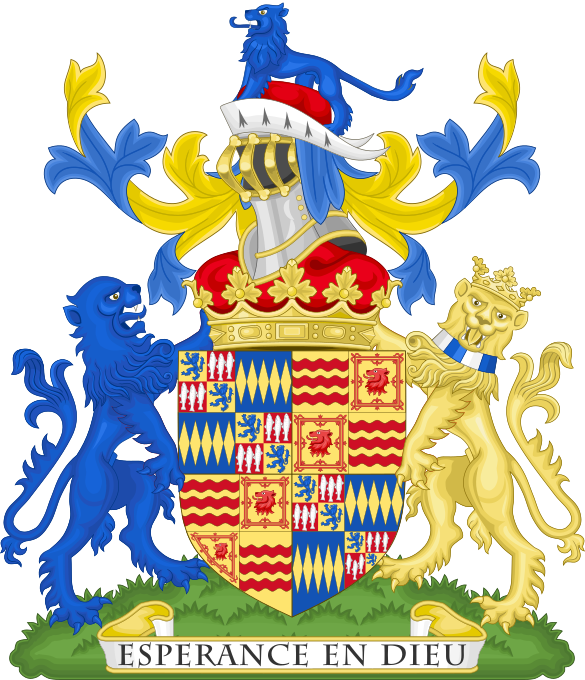
- Arms of Percy, Dukes of Northumberland: Quarterly: 1st and 4th grandquarters: 1st and 4th counterquartered: 1st and 4th, Or a Lion rampant Azure (Brabant and Lovaine, Percy modern); 2nd and 3rd, Gules three Lucies hauriant Argent (Lucy); 2nd and 3rd, Azure five Fusils conjoined in fess Or (Percy ancient); 2nd and 3rd grandquarters: quarterly: 1st and 4th, Or three Bars wavy Gules (Drummond); 2nd and 3rd, Or a Lion's Head erased within a Double Tressure flory counterflory Gules (Drummond, coat of augmentation).
- Creation date: 22 October 1766
- Creation: Third
- Created by: King George III
- Peerage: Peerage of Great Britain
- First holder: Hugh Percy, 1st Duke of Northumberland
- Present holder: Ralph Percy, 12th Duke of Northumberland
- Heir apparent: George Percy, Earl Percy
- Remainder to: the 1st Duke's heirs male of the body lawfully begotten
- Subsidiary titles: Earl of Northumberland; Earl Percy; Earl of Beverley; Baron Warkworth; Baron Lovaine; Baronet, of Stanwick
- Extinction date: 1553 (first creation); 1683 (second creation)
- Seats: Alnwick Castle; Syon House
- Former seats: Warkworth Castle; Prudhoe Castle; Kielder Castle; Northumberland House; Stanwick Park; Albury Park
- Motto: Esperance En Dieu (Hope in God)

Duke of Northumberland is a title that has been created three times in English and British history, twice in the Peerage of England and once in the Peerage of Great Britain. The current holder of this title is Ralph Percy, 12th Duke of Northumberland.

== 1551 creation ==
The title was first created in the Peerage of England in 1551 for John Dudley, 1st Earl of Warwick. He had already been created Viscount Lisle in 1543 and Earl of Warwick in 1547, also in the Peerage of England. In 1553, Dudley advanced the claim of his daughter-in-law, Lady Jane Grey, to the English throne, but when she was deposed by Queen Mary I, Dudley was convicted of high treason and executed. An illegitimate son of one of his younger sons, Robert Dudley, 1st Earl of Leicester, Sir Robert Dudley, claimed the dukedom when in exile in Italy. On 9 March 1620 Emperor Ferdinand II officially recognised the title, an act which infuriated King James VI and I.

== 1683 creation ==
George FitzRoy, 1st Earl of Northumberland, an illegitimate son of King Charles II, was created Duke of Northumberland in the Peerage of England in 1683. He had already been created Baron of Pontefract, Viscount Falmouth and Earl of Northumberland in 1674, also in the Peerage of England. However, all the titles became extinct on his death in 1716 as he left no heirs.

== Jacobite creation ==
In 1716 Philip Wharton, 1st Duke of Wharton, was created Duke of Northumberland, Marquess of Woburn, Earl of Malmesbury and Viscount Winchendon in the Jacobite Peerage, by the Old Pretender. The title had no legal validity in the Kingdom of Great Britain.

== 1766 creation ==
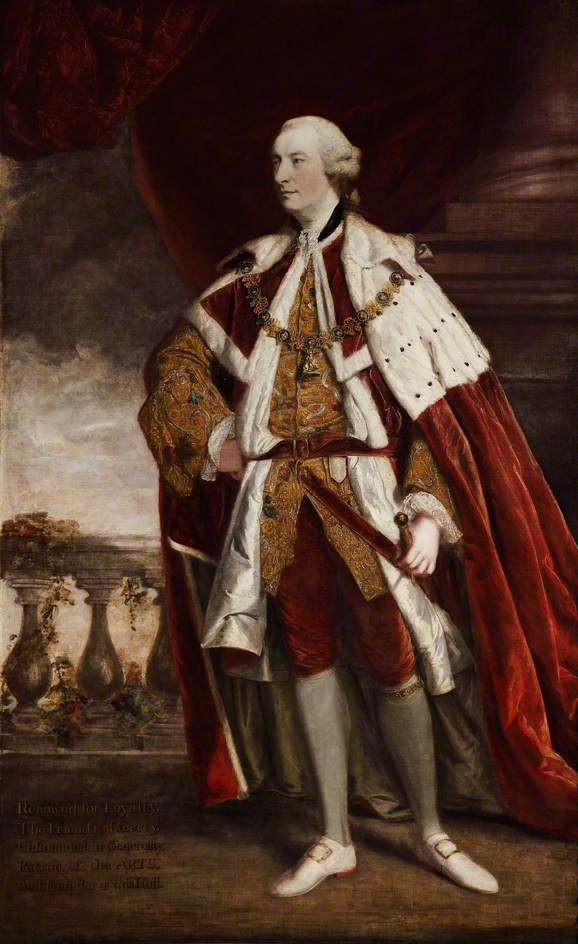
A portrait of Hugh Percy, 1st Duke of Northumberland

The title was created for the third time in 1766 for Hugh Percy, 2nd Earl of Northumberland (formerly Sir Hugh Smithson, 4th Baronet), who had assumed in 1750, by an act of Parliament, Hugh Earl of Northumberland's Name and Arms Act 1749 (23 Geo. 2. c. 14 Pr.), for himself and his descendants the surname Percy, due to his having married in 1740 the daughter of Algernon Seymour, 7th Duke of Somerset (1684–1750), whose mother Lady Elizabeth Percy (1667–1722) was the last of the senior blood line of the ancient House of Percy, being the only surviving child of Josceline Percy, 11th Earl of Northumberland (1644–1670). In 1749 King George II created Algernon (who had inherited the Dukedom of Somerset in 1748) Earl of Northumberland and Baron Warkworth, of Warkworth Castle in the County of Northumberland, with special remainder to his son-in-law Sir Hugh Smithson, 4th Baronet.

The above steps formed a deliberate move to allow ancient names and titles of the Percys to be revived in the male-heir exhausted senior branch of the Dukedom of Somerset, which at that time was about to see its largest removal – to another noble but very cadet branch (a fourth cousin) on Algernon's death. Algernon was also created Earl of Egremont at the same time, with a different remainder.

In 1784 the 1st Duke was also granted the substantive title Lord Lovaine, Baron of Alnwick in the County of Northumberland, in the Peerage of Great Britain, with remainder to his second son Lord Algernon Percy, who succeeded and who was created Earl of Beverley in 1790, and thus it too became a courtesy title.

The 1st Duke was succeeded in the dukedom and associated titles by his eldest son, Hugh, the 2nd Duke, a lieutenant-general in the British Army. The 2nd Duke was in his turn succeeded by his eldest son, Hugh, the 3rd Duke, who in 1812, five years before he succeeded in the dukedom, had been summoned to the House of Lords through a writ of acceleration in his father's junior title of Baron Percy. The 3rd Duke later held office as Lord-Lieutenant of Ireland from 1829 to 1830. He was childless and was succeeded by his younger brother, Algernon, 1st Baron Prudhoe, the 4th Duke, who in 1814 had been created Baron Prudhoe, of Prudhoe Castle in the County of Northumberland, in the Peerage of the United Kingdom. The 4th Duke was an admiral in the Royal Navy and notably served as First Lord of the Admiralty in 1852. He was also childless and on his death in 1865 the barony of Prudhoe became extinct while the barony of Percy (which could be passed on through the female line) was inherited by his great-nephew, John Stewart-Murray, 7th Duke of Atholl. The Admiral was succeeded in the dukedom and remaining titles by his first cousin, George, the 2nd Earl of Beverley, eldest son of the second son of the 1st Duke. The barony of Lovaine and earldom of Beverley have since been merged in the dukedom as courtesy titles.

The 5th Duke was succeeded by his eldest son, Algernon, the 6th Duke, who notably served as Lord Privy Seal between 1879 and 1880 under Lord Beaconsfield. The 6th Duke's eldest son, Henry, the 7th Duke, was summoned to the House of Lords through a writ of acceleration in his father's junior title of Lord Lovaine in 1887. The 7th Duke's eldest son, Henry Percy, Earl Percy, predeceased him. He was succeeded by his fourth but eldest surviving son, Alan, the 8th Duke, whose eldest son, Henry, the 9th Duke, was killed during the retreat to Dunkirk during the Second World War. Henry was succeeded by his younger brother, Hugh, the 10th Duke. In 1957, on the death of his fourth cousin once removed, James Stewart-Murray, 9th Duke of Atholl, Hugh succeeded as 9th Baron Percy, the title thus re-merging with the Dukedom. As of 2012 the titles are held by his second son, Ralph, the 12th Duke, who succeeded on the death of his elder brother in 1995.

Northumberland Estates manages 100,000 acres (40,000 hectares): directly managing 4,000 acres (1,600 hectares) of forestry and 20,000 acres (8,000 hectares) of farmland, with approximately 100 tenant farmers managing the remaining bulk of the land.

== Other members of the Percy family ==
Several other members of the Percy family have also gained distinction. Charlotte Percy, Duchess of Northumberland, wife of the third Duke, was governess of the future Queen Victoria. Lord Josceline Percy, second son of the fifth Duke, was a politician. Lord Henry Percy, third son of the fifth Duke, was a soldier. Lord Algernon Percy, second son of the sixth Duke, was a politician. Lord Eustace Percy, seventh son of the seventh Duke, was a politician who was raised to the peerage as Baron Percy of Newcastle in 1953. Jane Percy, Duchess of Northumberland, wife of the twelfth Duke, is Lord-Lieutenant of Northumberland since 2009. See also Earl of Beverley for younger sons of the first Earl of Beverley.

== Estates and residences ==
=== Country seat ===
The seat of the Dukes of Northumberland is Alnwick Castle, which is located in Alnwick, Northumberland.

The traditional burial place of the Dukes is the Northumberland Vault in Westminster Abbey in London, the Percys thus being the last family to maintain such a privilege. The family vault is however nearly full and a new private graveyard has been created in Hulne Park near Alnwick.

==== Former residences ====
Warkworth and Prudhoe castles were the residences of the Earls of Northumberland in the Middle Ages, and ownership was retained by the later Dukes. Both are now in the custody of English Heritage.

Albury Park is a former residence which has been converted into apartments, while the surrounding estate is still directly owned by the Duke.

Stanwick Park in Yorkshire was rebuilt by Hugh Percy, 1st Duke of Northumberland in 1740, and remained as one of the family's secondary residences; it was often used as a Dower house by the wives of former Dukes of Northumberland. The Stanwick estate was sold by Alan Percy, 8th Duke of Northumberland in 1922 as a result on death duties levied on his father's estate.

=== Estates ===
In the 1883 edition of John Bateman's The Great Landowners of Great Britain and Ireland, Algernon Percy, 6th Duke of Northumberland's estates were recorded as spanning 186,397 acres across England, including 181,616 acres in Northumberland, 3,765 acres in Surrey, 882 acres in Middlesex, and 134 acres in County Durham, which produced a combined annual income of £176,048.

Bateman separately recorded the estates of Eleanor, Dowager Duchess of Northumberland, widow of the 4th Duke, as comprising a further 5,683 acres in the North Riding of Yorkshire, centred on Stanwick Park, which produced an annual income of £8,320.

=== London residences ===
The family's London residence is Syon House in the outer-London Borough of Hounslow. From the 1640s until 1874 their London residence was the palatial Northumberland House located on The Strand.

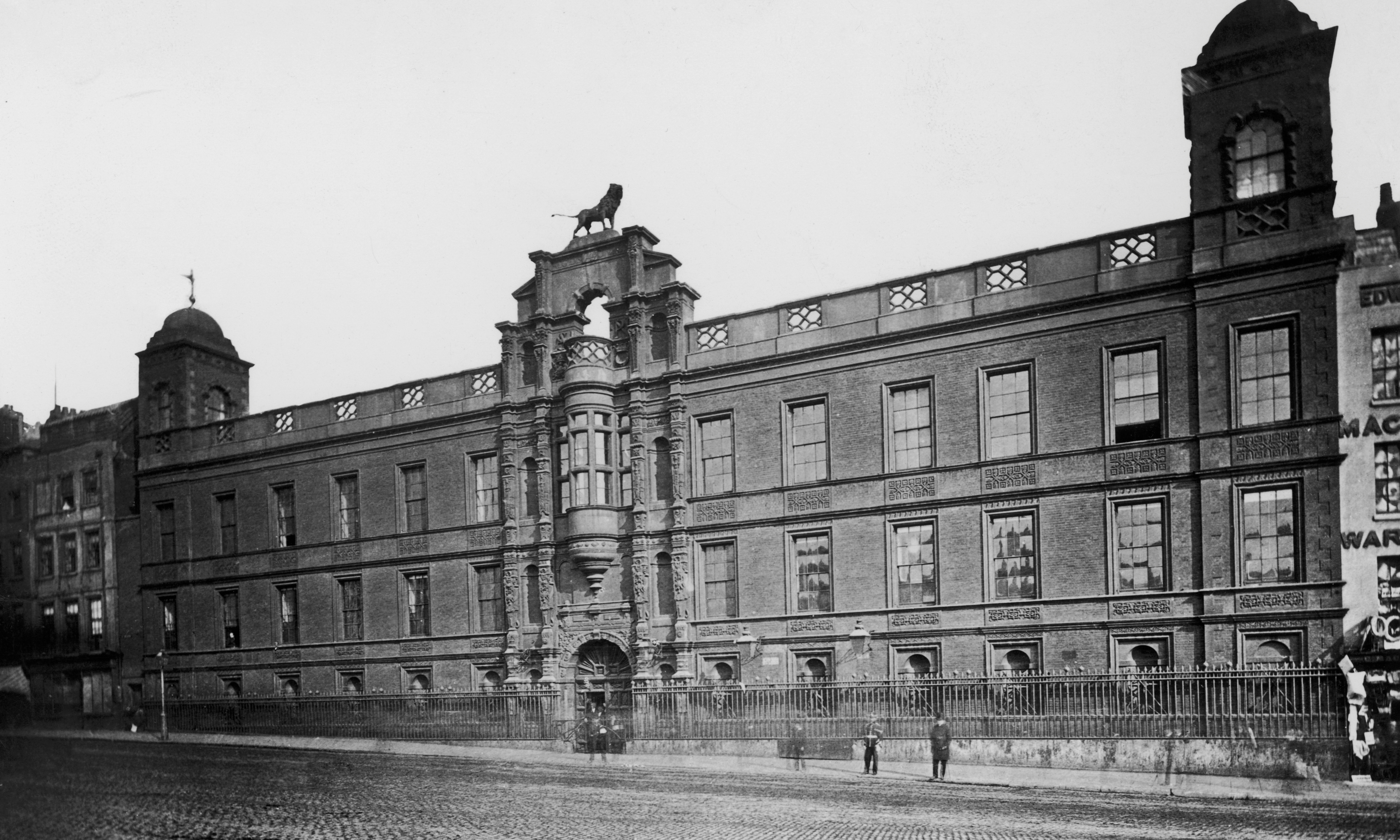
Northumberland House, shortly before it was demolished in 1874.

Northumberland House was sold to the Board of Metropolitan Works for £500,000 in 1874, and was then demolished to accommodate the expansion of Trafalgar Square.

In 1873 Algernon Percy, 6th Duke of Northumberland took a long lease of a new London residence at No. 2 Grosvenor Place, which remained as the family's London home until the First World War. Henry Percy, 7th Duke of Northumberland subsequently purchased the freehold of a large townhouse overlooking Hyde Park at No. 17 Prince's Gate in 1917.

Following the death of Alan Percy, 8th Duke of Northumberland in 1930, his executors attempted to sell No. 17 Prince's Gate; the house was eventually sold in 1939 and repurposed as the Embassy of Ethiopia in London.

== List of titleholders ==
=== Dukes of Northumberland; First creation (1551) ===
Created by Edward VI of England
| Image | Name | Period | Duchess | Notes | Other titles |
|---|---|---|---|---|---|
| | John Dudley, 1st Duke of Northumberland (1504–1553) | 1551–1553 | Jane Guildford | Tudor courtier and general, regent for Edward VI, executed for high treason against Mary I | Earl of Warwick; Viscount Lisle; Baron Lisle |

=== Dukes of Northumberland; Second creation (1683) ===
Created by Charles II of England
| Image | Name | Period | Duchess | Notes | Other titles |
|---|---|---|---|---|---|
| | George FitzRoy, 1st Duke of Northumberland (1665–1716) | 1683–1716 | Catherine Wheatley; Mary Dutton | Illegitimate son of Charles II, died without heirs male | Earl of Northumberland; Viscount Falmouth; Baron of Pontefract |

=== Earls of Northumberland; Third creation (1749) ===
Created by George II of Great Britain
| Image | Name | Period | Countess | Notes | Other titles |
|---|---|---|---|---|---|
| | Algernon Seymour, 7th Duke of Somerset, 1st Earl of Northumberland (1684–1750) | 1749–1750 | Frances Thynne | Grandson of Josceline Percy, 11th Earl of Northumberland | Duke of Somerset etc. Baron Warkworth |
| | Hugh Percy (Smithson), 2nd Earl of Northumberland (1714–1786) | 1750–1786 | Elizabeth Percy, 2nd Baroness Percy | Son-in-law of Algernon Seymour, 1st Earl of Northumberland; created Duke of Northumberland in 1766 | Baron Warkworth; Baronet of Stanwick |

=== Dukes of Northumberland; Third creation (1766) ===
Created by George III of Great Britain
| Image | Name | Period | Duchess | Notes | Other titles |
|---|---|---|---|---|---|
| | Hugh Percy (Smithson), 1st Duke of Northumberland (1714–1786) | 1766–1786 | Elizabeth Percy, 2nd Baroness Percy | Created Lord Lovaine in 1784, with remainder to his second son Lord Algernon Percy, later 2nd Lord Lovaine and 1st Earl of Beverley. | Earl of Northumberland; Earl Percy; Baron Warkworth; Baron Lovaine; Baronet of Stanwick |
| | Hugh Percy, 2nd Duke of Northumberland (1742–1817) | 1786–1817 | Frances Burrell | Son of the preceding | Earl of Northumberland; Earl Percy; Baron Percy; Baron Warkworth; Baronet of Stanwick |
| | Hugh Percy, 3rd Duke of Northumberland (1785–1847) | 1817–1847 | Lady Charlotte Clive | Son of the preceding; had been summoned to the House of Lords as Baron Percy in 1812 | Earl of Northumberland; Earl Percy; Baron Percy; Baron Warkworth; Baronet of Stanwick |
| | Algernon Percy, 4th Duke of Northumberland (1792–1865) | 1847–1865 | Lady Eleanor Grosvenor | Brother of the preceding; had been created Baron Prudhoe in his own right in 1814 | Earl of Northumberland; Earl Percy; Baron Percy; Baron Warkworth; Baron Prudhoe; Baronet of Stanwick |
| | George Percy, 5th Duke of Northumberland (1778–1867) | 1865–1867 | widowed | Cousin of the preceding; eldest son of Algernon Percy, 1st Earl of Beverley, second son of the 1st Duke of Northumberland – had succeeded in earldom in 1830 | Earl of Northumberland; Earl Percy; Earl of Beverley; Baron Warkworth; Lord Lovaine; Baronet of Stanwick |
| | Algernon George Percy, 6th Duke of Northumberland (1810–1899) | 1867–1899 | Louisa Drummond | Son of the preceding | Earl of Northumberland; Earl Percy; Earl of Beverley; Baron Warkworth; Lord Lovaine; Baronet of Stanwick |
| | Henry George Percy, 7th Duke of Northumberland (1846–1918) | 1899–1918 | Lady Edith Campbell | Son of the preceding; had been summoned to the House of Lords as Lord Lovaine in 1887 | Earl of Northumberland; Earl Percy; Earl of Beverley; Baron Warkworth; Lord Lovaine; Baronet of Stanwick |
| | Alan Ian Percy, 8th Duke of Northumberland (1880–1930) | 1918–1930 | Lady Helen Gordon-Lennox | Son of the preceding | Earl of Northumberland; Earl Percy; Earl of Beverley; Baron Warkworth; Lord Lovaine; Baronet of Stanwick |
| | Henry George Alan Percy, 9th Duke of Northumberland (1912–1940) | 1930–1940 | none | Son of the preceding | Earl of Northumberland; Earl Percy; Earl of Beverley; Baron Warkworth; Lord Lovaine; Baronet of Stanwick |
| | Hugh Algernon Percy, 10th Duke of Northumberland (1914–1988) | 1940–1988 | Lady Elizabeth Montagu Douglas Scott | Brother of the preceding | Earl of Northumberland; Earl Percy; Earl of Beverley; Baron Percy (from 1957); Baron Warkworth; Lord Lovaine; Baronet of Stanwick |
| | Henry Alan Walter Richard Percy, 11th Duke of Northumberland (1953–1995) | 1988–1995 | none | Son of the preceding | Earl of Northumberland; Earl Percy; Earl of Beverley; Baron Percy (from 1957); Baron Warkworth; Lord Lovaine; Baronet of Stanwick |
| | Ralph George Algernon Percy, 12th Duke of Northumberland (b. 1956) | since 1995 | Jane Richard | Brother of the preceding | Earl of Northumberland; Earl Percy; Earl of Beverley; Baron Percy (from 1957); Baron Warkworth; Lord Lovaine; Baronet of Stanwick |

The heir apparent is the present holder's elder son George Percy, Earl Percy (b. 1984)

==== Family tree and succession ====
Family tree of the Earls and Dukes of Northumberland and Earls of Beverley

King Henry III; 1207–1272
Baron Percy of Alnwick (2nd creation), 1299
Henry de Percy; 1273–1314; 8th Baron Percy of Topcliffe, 1st Baron Percy | Edmund Crouchback; 1245–1296; Earl of Leicester, Earl of Lancaster, Earl of Derby | King Edward I 1239–1307
Henry de Percy; 1300–1351; 9th Baron Percy of Topcliffe, 2nd Baron Percy | Henry c. 1281–1345; Earl of Leicester, Earl of Lancaster | King Edward II; 1284–1327
Henry de Percy; 1320–1368; 3rd Baron Percy | Mary of Lancaster c. 1320–1321–1362 | Henry of Grosmont c. 1310–1361; Duke of Lancaster, Earl of Leicester | King Edward III; 1312–1377
Earl of Northumberland (1st creation), 1377 | Earl of Worcester
Henry Percy; 1341–1408; 1st Earl of Northumberland, 4th Baron Percy | Thomas Percy; 1343–1403; Earl of Worcester | Blanche of Lancaster; 1342–1368 | John of Gaunt; 1340–1399; Duke of Lancaster, Earl of Leicester, Earl of Derby, Earl of Richmond
(attainted 1405)
Henry Percy "Hotspur" c. 1365–1403 | Joan Beaufort c. 1379–1440 | John Beaufort c. 1370–1410; Earl of Somerset
Earl of Northumberland (2nd creation), 1416
Henry Percy; 1394–1455; 2nd Earl of Northumberland, 5th Baron Percy | Eleanor Neville c. 1398–1472 | Richard Neville; 1400–1460; Earl of Salisbury | John Beaufort; 1404–1444; Duke of Somerset | Edmund Beaufort; 1406–1455; Duke of Somerset
Earl of Northumberland (3rd creation), 1464; Marquess of Montagu, 1470
Henry Percy; 1421–1461; 3rd Earl of Northumberland, 6th Baron Percy | John Neville c. 1431–1471; Marquess of Montagu, etc. | Eleanor Beaufort; 1431–1501 | Margaret Beaufort; 1443–1509
(forfeit 1461) | Marquessate of Montagu and Earldom of Northumberland (3rd creation) forfeit, 1470
(restored 1470)
Henry Percy; 1449–1489; 4th Earl of Northumberland, 7th Baron Percy | King Henry VII; 1457–1509
Henry Algernon Percy; 1478–1527; 5th Earl of Northumberland, 8th Baron Percy | Katherine Spencer; 1477–1542 | Mary Tudor (Queen of France); 1496–1533 m.(2) Charles Brandon; Duke of Suffolk | Margaret Tudor; 1489–1541
Duke of Northumberland (1st creation), 1551
Henry Percy; 1502–1537; 6th Earl of Northumberland, 9th Baron Percy | Thomas Percy c. 1504–1537 | John Dudley; 1504–1553; 1st Duke of Northumberland | Frances Brandon; 1517–1559 m. Henry Grey; Duke of Suffolk | James V of Scotland; 1512–1542
(attainted 1537) | (extinct 1553)
Earl of Northumberland (2nd creation) restored and Baron Percy of Alnwick (3rd creation), 1557
Thomas Percy; 1528–1572; 7th Earl of Northumberland, 1st Baron Percy | Henry Percy; 1532–1585; 8th Earl of Northumberland, 2nd Baron Percy | Guildford Dudley c. 1535–1554 | Jane Grey c. 1537–1554 | Lady Katherine Grey; 1540–1568 m. Edward Seymour; Earl of Hertford | Mary, Queen of Scots; 1542–1587
Henry Percy; 1564–1632; 9th Earl of Northumberland, 3rd Baron Percy | Edward Seymour; 1561–1612; Viscount Beauchamp | King James VI and I 1566–1625
Algernon Percy; 1602–1668; 10th Earl of Northumberland, 4th Baron Percy | Francis Seymour c. 1590–1664; Baron Seymour of Trowbridge | King Charles I 1600–1649
Josceline Percy; 1644–1670; 11th Earl of Northumberland, 5th Baron Percy | Charles Seymour c. 1621–1665; Baron Seymour of Trowbridge | King Charles II; 1630–1685
Earldom of Northumberland and Barony Percy extinct, 1670
Earl of Northumberland (4th creation), Viscount Falmouth (1st creation), and Baron of Pontefract, 1674; Duke of Northumberland (2nd creation), 1683
Elizabeth Seymour; 1667–1722 | Charles Seymour; 1662–1748; Duke of Somerset | George FitzRoy; 1665–1716; Duke of Northumberland, etc.
Earldom of Northumberland and Dukedom of Northumberland extinct, 1716
Baron Percy (4th creation) created erroneously, 1722; Earl of Northumberland (5th creation) and Baron Warkworth, 1749
Algernon Seymour; 1684–1750; Duke of Somerset, 1st Earl of Northumberland, etc. 1st Baron Percy
Duke of Northumberland (3rd creation), 1766; Lord Lovaine, Baron of Alnwick in the County of Northumberland
Hugh Percy formerly Hugh Smithson; 1714–1786; 1st Duke of Northumberland, 2nd Earl of Northumberland, etc. 1st Baron Lovaine, 4th Baronet Smithson | Elizabeth Seymour; 1716–1776; 2nd Baroness Percy suo jure
Earl of Beverley, 1790
Hugh Percy; 1742–1817; 2nd Duke of Northumberland, 3rd Earl of Northumberland, etc. 3rd Baron Percy | Algernon Percy; 1750–1830; 1st Earl of Beverley, 2nd Baron Lovaine
Baron Prudhoe, of Prudhoe Castle in the County of Northumberland, 1814
Hugh Percy; 1785–1847; 3rd Duke of Northumberland, 4th Earl of Northumberland, etc. 4th Baron Percy | Emily Frances Percy; 1789–1844 | Algernon Percy; 1792–1865; 4th Duke of Northumberland, 5th Earl of Northumberland, etc. 1st Baron Prudhoe, 5th Baron Percy | George Percy; 1778–1867; 5th Duke of Northumberland, 6th Earl of Northumberland, etc. 2nd Earl of Beverley, 3rd Baron Lovaine
Barony Prudhoe extinct, 1865
George Augustus Frederick John Murray; 1814–1864; Duke of Atholl, Baron Strange | Algernon George Percy; 1810–1899; 6th Duke of Northumberland, 7th Earl of Northumberland, etc. 3rd Earl of Beverley, 4th Baron Lovaine
John James Hugh Henry Stewart-Murray; 1840–1917; Duke of Atholl, Baron Strange, 6th Baron Percy | Henry George Percy; 1846–1918; 7th Duke of Northumberland, 8th Earl of Northumberland, etc. 4th Earl of Beverley, 5th Baron Lovaine
John George Stewart-Murray; 1871–1942; Duke of Atholl, Baron Strange, 7th Baron Percy | James Thomas Stewart-Murray; 1879–1957; Duke of Atholl, Baron Strange, 8th Baron Percy | Alan Ian Percy; 1880–1930; 8th Duke of Northumberland, 9th Earl of Northumberland, etc. 5th Earl of Beverley, 6th Baron Lovaine
Henry George Alan Percy; 1912–1940; 9th Duke of Northumberland, 10th Earl of Northumberland, etc. 6th Earl of Beverley, 7th Baron Lovaine | Hugh Algernon Percy; 1914–1988; 10th Duke of Northumberland, 11th Earl of Northumberland, etc. 7th Earl of Beverley, 8th Baron Lovaine, 9th Baron Percy
Henry Alan Walter Richard Percy; 1953–1995; 11th Duke of Northumberland, 12th Earl of Northumberland, etc. 8th Earl of Beverley, 9th Baron Lovaine, 10th Baron Percy | Ralph George Algernon Percy b. 1956; 12th Duke of Northumberland, 13th Earl of Northumberland, etc. 9th Earl of Beverley, 10th Baron Lovaine, 11th Baron Percy
George Dominic Percy b. 1984 styled Earl Percy
Heir apparent to the Dukedom of Northumberland

Line of succession (simplified)
- Hugh Percy, 1st Duke of Northumberland (c. 1714–1786)
  - Hugh Percy, 2nd Duke of Northumberland (1742–1817)
    - Hugh Percy, 3rd Duke of Northumberland (1785–1847)
    - Algernon Percy, 4th Duke of Northumberland (1792–1865)
  - Algernon Percy, 1st Earl of Beverley (1750–1830)
    - George Percy, 5th Duke of Northumberland (1778–1867)
      - Algernon Percy, 6th Duke of Northumberland (1810–1899)
        - Henry Percy, 7th Duke of Northumberland (1846–1918)
          - Alan Percy, 8th Duke of Northumberland (1880–1930)
            - George Percy, 9th Duke of Northumberland (1912–1940)
            - Hugh Percy, 10th Duke of Northumberland (1914–1988)
              - Henry Percy, 11th Duke of Northumberland (1953–1995)
              - Ralph Percy, 12th Duke of Northumberland (b. 1956)
                - (1). George Percy, Earl Percy (b. 1984)
                - (2). Lord Max Percy (b. 1990)
              - (3). Lord James William Eustace Percy (b. 1965)
                - (4). Thomas Hugh Percy (b. 2001)
                - (5). Samuel James Edward Percy (b. 2008)
            - Lord Richard Charles Percy (1921–1989)
              - male issue in remainder
          - Lord William Richard Percy (1882–1963)
            - Henry Edward Percy (1925–1985)
              - male issue in remainder
            - Gerald Percy (1928–2005)
              - male issue and descendants in remainder
    - Hugh Percy (1784–1856)
      - Algernon Charles Heber–Percy (1812–1901)
        - Algernon Heber-Percy (1845–1911)
          - Algernon Hugh Heber-Percy (1869–1941)
            - Algernon George William Heber-Percy (1904–1961)
              - male issue and descendants in remainder
            - Hugh Reginald Heber-Percy (1905–1989)
              - William David Heber-Percy (1939–2020)
                - male issue in remainder
              - other male issue in remainder
          - Josceline Reginald Heber-Percy (1880–1964)
            - David Josceline Algernon Heber-Percy (1909–1971)
              - male issue and descendants in remainder
        - Alan William Heber-Percy (1865–1946)
          - Hugh Alan Heber-Percy (1897–1976)
            - male issue in remainder
          - John Heber-Percy (1910–1975)
            - male issue and descendants in remainder
      - Henry Percy (1813–1870)
        - Josceline Hugh Percy (1856–1910)
          - Josceline Richard Percy (1894–1971)
            - male issue in remainder

== Coat of arms ==
Coat of arms of Duke of Northumberland
| Coronet A Coronet of a Duke Crest On a Chapeau Gules turned up Ermine a Lion statant with tail extended Azure Escutcheon Quarterly: 1st and 4th grandquarters: 1st and 4th counterquartered: 1st and 4th, Or a Lion rampant Azure (Brabant and Lovaine); 2nd and 3rd, Gules three Lucies hauriant Argent (Lucy); 2nd and 3rd, Azure five Fusils conjoined in fess Or (Percy); 2nd and 3rd grandquarters: quarterly: 1st and 4th, Or three Bars wavy Gules (Drummond); 2nd and 3rd, Or a Lion's Head erased within a Double Tressure flory counterflory Gules (Drummond, coat of augmentation) Supporters Dexter: a Lion rampant Azure; Sinister: a Lion rampant guardant Or ducally crowned of the last gorged with a Collar company Argent and Azure Motto Esperance En Dieu (Hope in God) |

== Ducal pipers ==
Since at least the mid 18th century, the family has maintained a Northumbrian piper; the earliest known of these was Joseph Turnbull, who was painted in 1756 playing his pipes; the portrait, entitled Joseph Turnbull, Piper to the Duchess of Northumberland is at Alnwick Castle. At this time, before the Third Creation of the Dukedom, he would actually have been piper to the Countess. A later piper, William Green stated that "Joe Turnbull was the first Piper at Alnwick Castle – that was ever!" A list of the Ducal Pipers is at. The Ducal Piper from 1982-2022 was Richard Butler and the position is currently held by Andrew Davison. The piper's main duty is to play at the Shrove Tuesday football match in Alnwick, but they are invited to a variety of other functions.

Other pipers have been associated less formally with the family – the notorious piper James Allan (1729–1810) was a favourite of the Countess; in the last century Tom Clough and Richard Mowat are known to have played together with the Duke's then piper, James Hall, for the Duke and his guests at Alnwick; one such guest was Edward VII, in 1905.

== Named in their honour ==
- Northumberland Islands, off Queensland, Australia
  - Northumberland Islands National Park, a protected area in Queensland
- Percy Isles, off Queensland, Australia
  - Percy Isles National Park, a protected area in Queensland

== In popular culture ==
- Sir Henry Percy, popularly known as "Harry Hotspur", is portrayed as a dashing hero by William Shakespeare in his historical play Henry IV, Part One. Sir Henry was the eldest son and heir apparent of the 1st Earl of Northumberland and would have succeeded his father if not for his untimely death at the Battle of Shrewsbury.
- Lord Percy Percy, played by Tim McInnerny, is a major character in the first two series of the British sitcom Blackadder. In the first series, he is the Duke of Northumberland, while the Lord Percy in the second series is presumably his descendant and is heir to the dukedom. The first series was partly filmed at Alnwick Castle, the residence and seat of the real Dukes of Northumberland.

== See also ==
- Alnwick Castle – the family's main residence
- Alnwick Garden – adjacent to Alnwick Castle
- Northumberland House – the family's former residence in central London (demolished in 1874)
- Northumbrian tartan
- Royal National Lifeboat Institution, in which several dukes played a role in the 19th to 20th centuries
- Syon House – the family's Thames-side residence in west London
