= Henry Percy, 11th Duke of Northumberland =

British peer and film producer (1953–1995)

His Grace The Duke of Northumberland
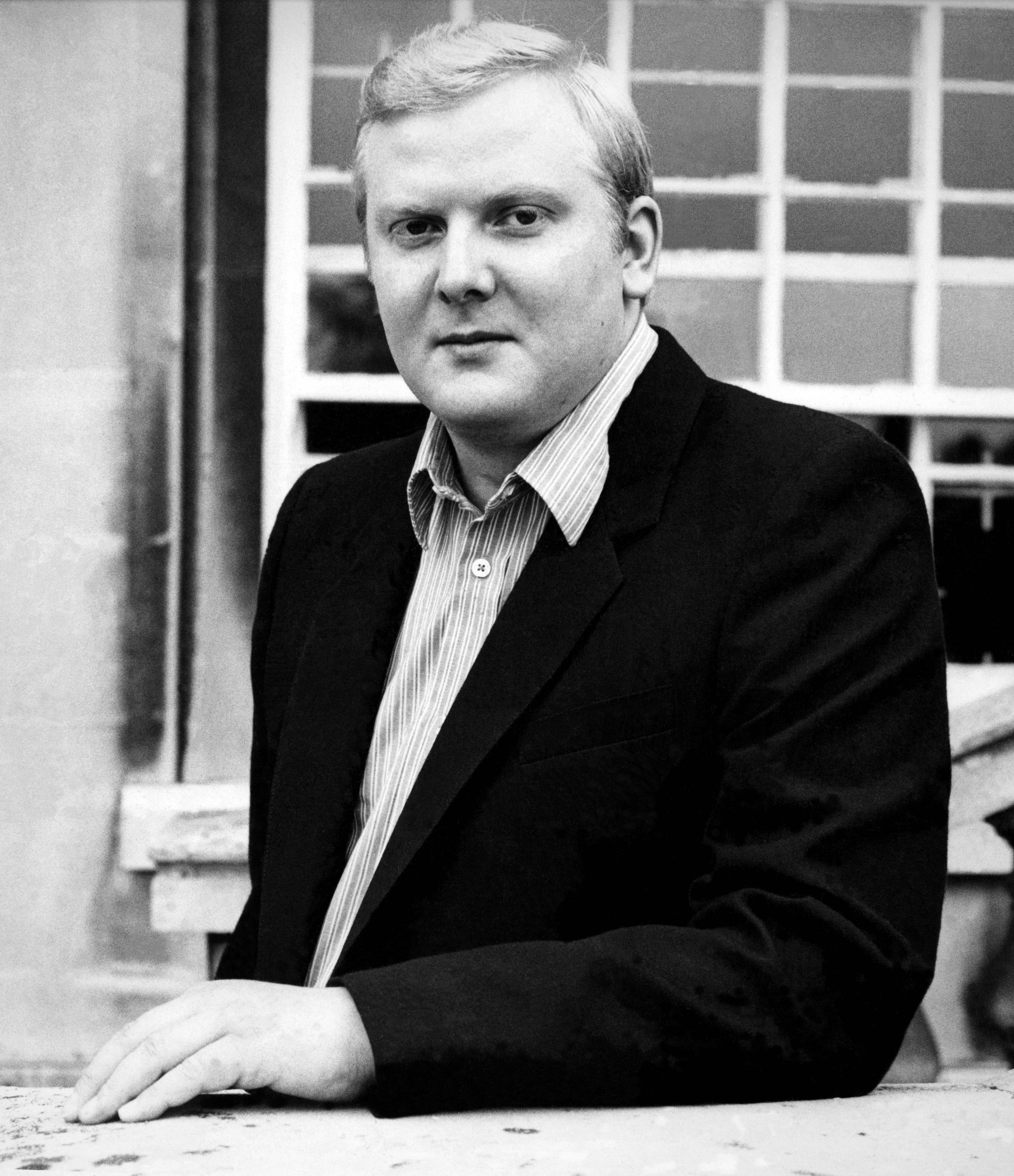
- Portrait by Allan Warren
- Tenure: 11 October 1988– 31 October 1995
- Predecessor: The 10th Duke of Northumberland
- Successor: The 12th Duke of Northumberland
- Born: Henry Alan Walter Richard Percy, Earl Percy; 1 July 1953; Hounslow, London
- Died: 31 October 1995 (aged 42); London, United Kingdom
- Parents: Hugh Percy, 10th Duke of Northumberland; Lady Elizabeth Montagu Douglas Scott

Henry Alan Walter Richard Percy, 11th Duke of Northumberland (1 July 1953 – 31 October 1995), styled Earl Percy until 1988, was a British peer from the Percy family.

He was born at Syon House, the ducal residence at Brentford, the eldest son and heir of Hugh Percy, 10th Duke of Northumberland, and his wife, the former Lady Elizabeth Montagu Douglas Scott, daughter of the 8th Duke of Buccleuch. He was a godchild of Queen Elizabeth II. His other godparents included his uncle Lord Richard Percy, his aunt the Countess of Dalkeith, and the Countess of Cromer.

He was educated at Eton College and Christ Church, Oxford. After succeeding to the dukedom on the death of his father on 11 October 1988, he was noted for planting many trees at Syon House; for an unsuccessful foray into film-making involving the Duke in front of and behind the camera; for romantic relationships with Naomi Campbell's mother, Valerie, and with American actress Barbara Carrera; and for excessive and adventurous drug taking.

Percy was diagnosed with chronic fatigue syndrome. He never married, and died aged 42 from heart failure after an overdose of amphetamines.

He was succeeded to the dukedom by his younger brother Lord Ralph Percy.

Peerage of Great Britain
Preceded by Hugh Percy	Duke of Northumberland; 1988–1995	Succeeded by Ralph Percy
