= Schloss Hirschbrunn =

Castle in Bavaria

Coordinates: 49°00′20″N 10°34′58″E

Schloss Hirschbrunn is a castle in Auhausen, Bavaria. The castle is a private residence and is owned by the House of Oettingen-Spielberg.

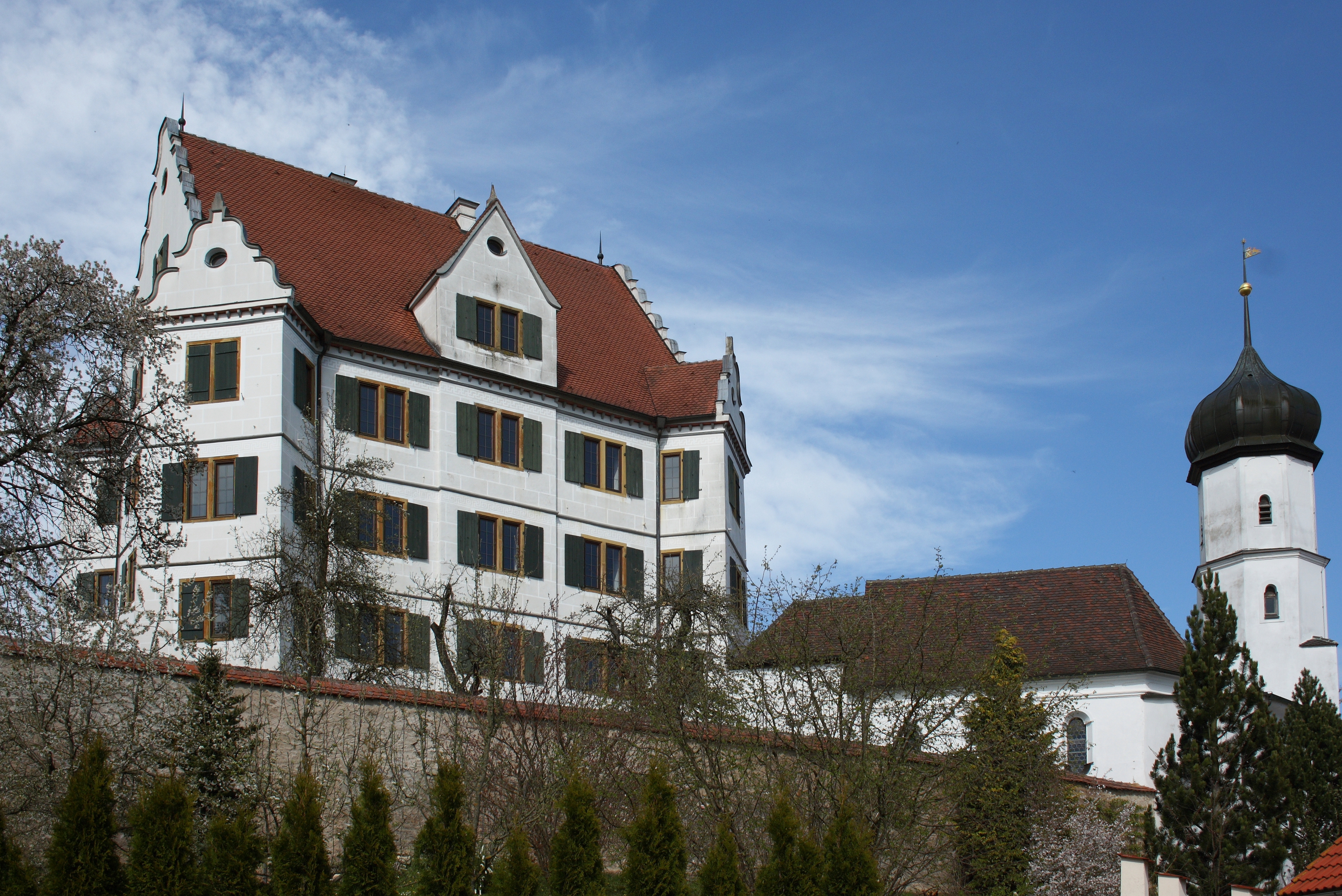
Schloss Hirschbrunn

== History ==
Schloss Hirschbrunn started as a hunting lodge for members of the House of Oettingen. Construction began around 1600. The castle was built by Peter and Hans Alberthal and was made for Count Gottfried of Oettingen-Oettingen and Wilhelm II, Count of Oettingen-Wallerstein. The castle was reportedly looted in 1634 after the Battle of Nördlingen. Albert Ernest II, Prince of Oettingen-Oettingen sold the castle to Count Franz Albrecht of Oettingen-Spielberg in the late 17th century. Franz Albrecht had the castle expanded in 1692 and built a Catholic chapel. The castle served as a school from 1700 to 1846. After World War II it was used as a warehouse. It was renovated in 1978 and again in 1992. It is now owned by the House of Oettingen-Spielberg and is not open to the public.
