= Oakfield, Georgia =

- Unincorporated community
- Location within Georgia
- Coordinates: 31°46′41″N 83°58′17″W
- Country: United States
- State: Georgia
- County: Worth
- Elevation: 269 ft (82 m)
- Time zone: UTC-5 (Eastern (EST))
  - Summer (DST): UTC-4 (EDT)
- ZIP code: 31772
- Area code: 229
- GNIS feature ID: 332541

Oakfield is an unincorporated community in Worth County, Georgia, United States. The community is on Georgia State Route 300 in the county's far northwestern portion, 4.8 miles (7.7 km) southwest of Warwick. Oakfield has a post office with ZIP code 31772.

Oakfield was once an incorporated town; it was incorporated in 1900.
