= St Michael's Church, Alnwick =

St Michael’s Church, Alnwick
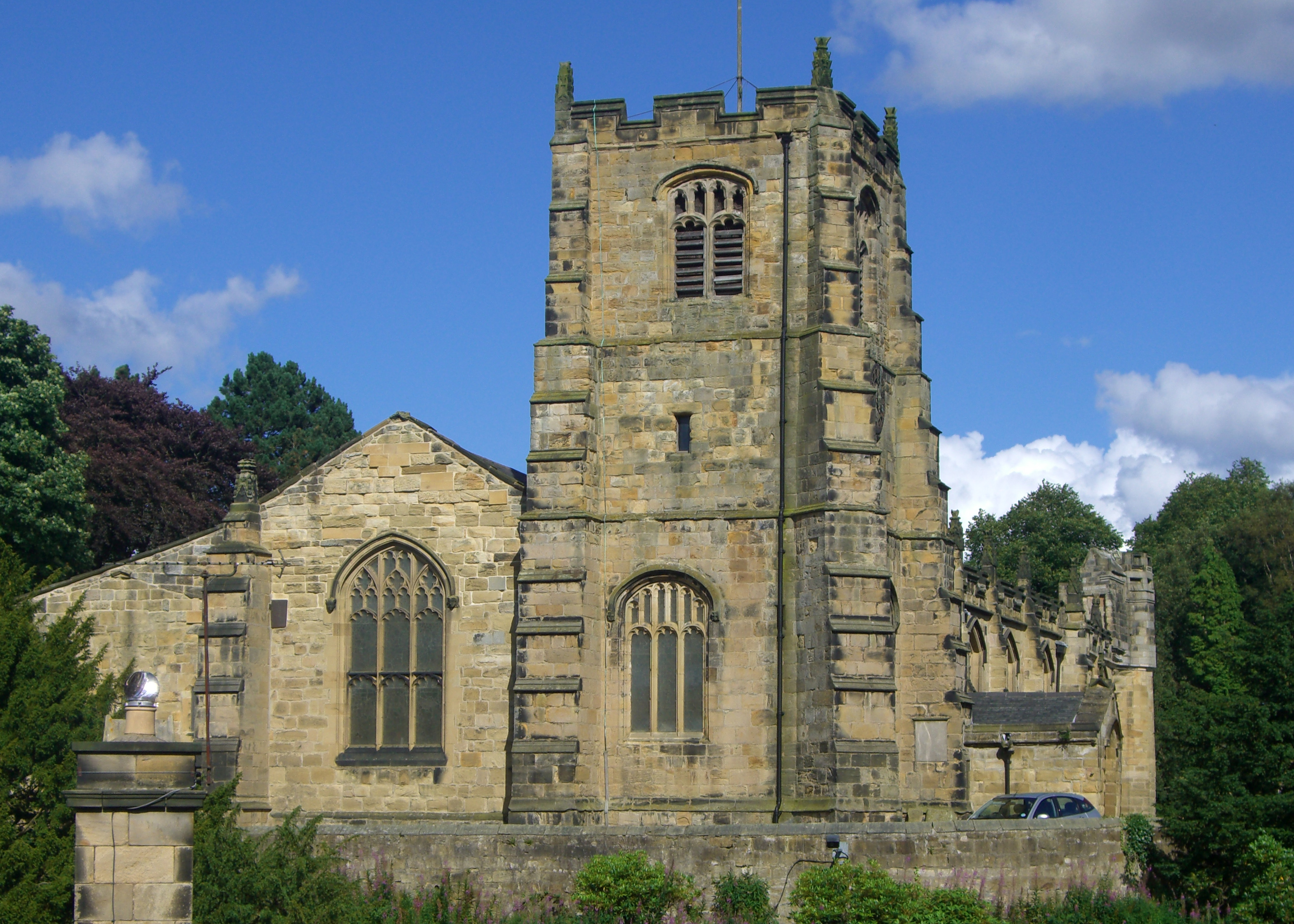
- St Michael’s Church, Alnwick
- St Michael’s Church, Alnwick
- 55°25′1.4″N 1°42′39.23″W
- Location: 12 Bailiffgate, Alnwick, Northumberland NE66 1NB
- Country: England
- Denomination: Church of England

History
- Dedication: St Michael

Architecture
- Heritage designation: Grade I listed

Administration
- Diocese: Diocese of Newcastle
- Archdeaconry: Lindisfarne
- Deanery: Alnwick
- Parish: Alnwick St Michael and St Paul

St Michael's Church is an Anglican place of worship situated on Bailiffgate in the town of Alnwick in Northumberland, England. The current building dates from the 15th century but a 12th-century Norman chapel stood on the site prior to this; reports of an earlier 8th-century Saxon chapel are unconfirmed. The church is dedicated to St Michael the Archangel, in earlier times it was also dedicated to St Mary as well. It is a Grade I listed building.

== History ==
=== Church founded ===
The first written mention of a church on the site is found in a charter of 1147 in which Eustace fitz John endowed the newly founded Alnwick Abbey with various gifts including the Chapel of Alnwick. Very few remnants of this Norman chapel are visible in the present day church, some surviving stones with a diaper pattern are built into the chancel. The 1863 restoration revealed some buried basements of pillars in the late Norman style of architecture which existed in the first half of the 12th century. Old foundations were also exposed by the 1863 restoration which confirmed that the Norman chapel had a long, narrow nave and a small apse. The church suffered severe damage from Scottish raids during the first half of the 14th century during the Wars of Scottish Independence. The second half of the century saw repair work undertaken, which included the present nave being built and the addition of the north aisle, as well as the construction of the north wall all in the Decorated style.

=== 15th century ===
The 15th century saw the majority of the present day church built; evidence suggests that the old church was in a ruinous state by this time. Towards the end of the 14th century the Decorated style of architecture was replaced by the Perpendicular style and it is in this design that most of the new church was built. Financial aid for the rebuild came directly from the monarch King Henry VI who issued a charter in 1464 granting the burgesses of Alnwick a port at Alnmouth with tolls on exports from it, plus a fair and market at Alnwick so that besides doing other work they might "make and repair their church". The substantial money brought in from this royal grant enabled the Burgesses of Alnwick to turn St Michael's into "one of the finest examples of the perpendicular style of architecture in the north". The highlight of the 15th century work was the impressive and spacious chancel with its octagonal pillars which are elaborately sculptured.

=== Restorations of 1782 and 1818 ===
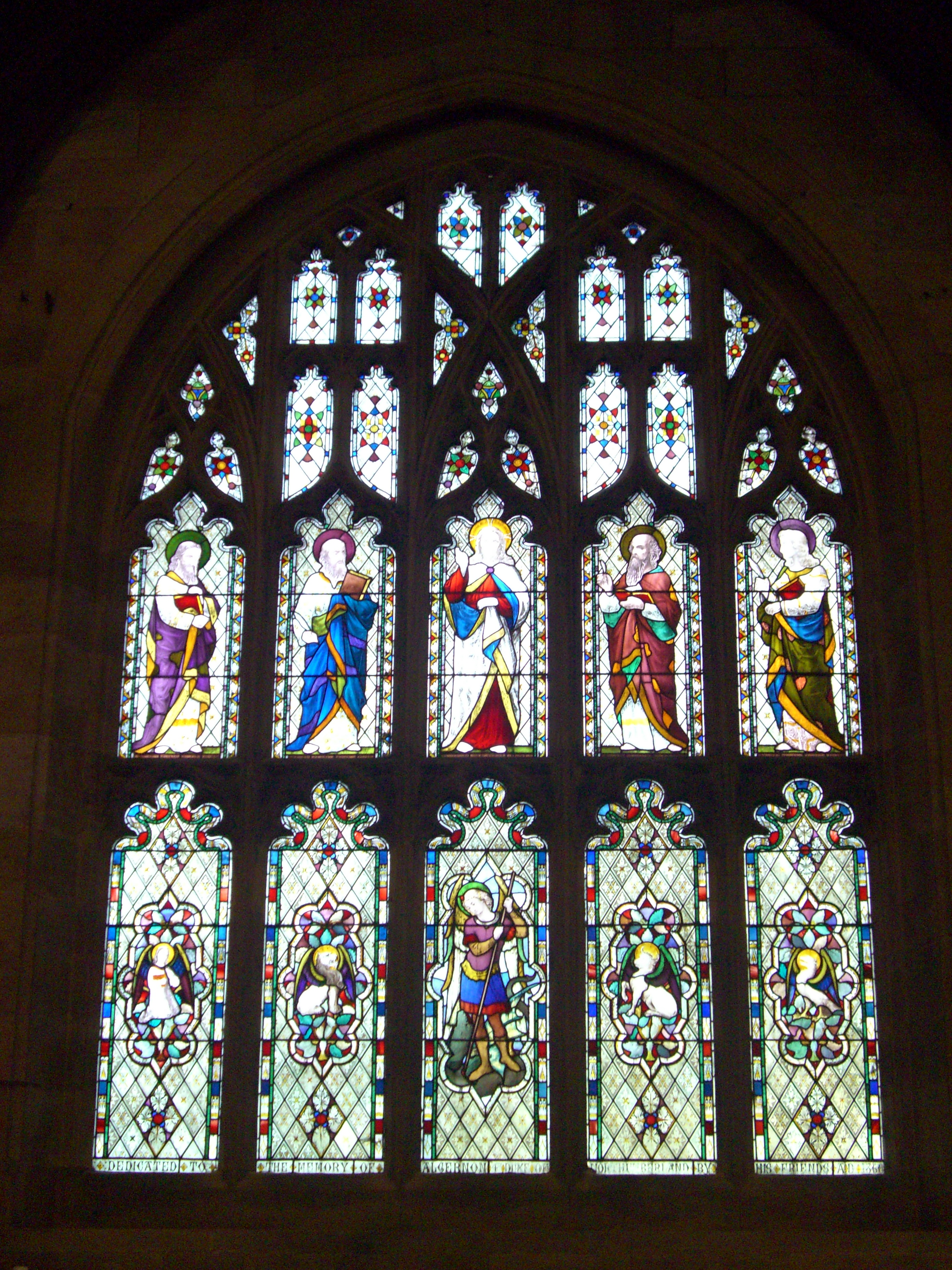
One of the east windows

There were no further changes to the church until the latter years of the 18th century when Hugh Percy, 1st Duke of Northumberland, after renovating Alnwick Castle, repaired the chancel using his own architect Vincent Shepherd (1750–1812) assisted by Italian craftsmen. The work included a new window in the middle of the east end, a fan vaulted plaster ceiling and oak stalls for the Duke and his family. A revival in church attendance in the early part of the 19th century led to a statement in 1811 by the church councillors that accommodation was insufficient. As a result of this, a sum of £2,000 was spent in 1818 increasing the capacity to 1,200; this was achieved by removing the small galleries and adding a large one at the west end. Funds for this project came from a large donation from Hugh Percy, 3rd Duke of Northumberland, and from money raised through the church rates and the sale of seats.

=== Salvin's restoration of 1863 ===
When Algernon Percy, 4th Duke of Northumberland, was restoring Alnwick Castle between 1854 and 1865 he agreed to finance the restoration of St Michael's. The restoration started in 1863 and was overseen by Anthony Salvin who was also directing the work on the castle. Salvin swept away many of the mistakes of the two previous restorations, removing the plaster ceilings and the gallery. He strengthened some areas of the church and reinstated four pillars and the pointed arches to the nave which had been removed in the 1818 renewal. He also replaced some of the windows with new ones in the Perpendicular style. The chancel aisle was filled with oak pews.

== Features ==
=== Exterior ===
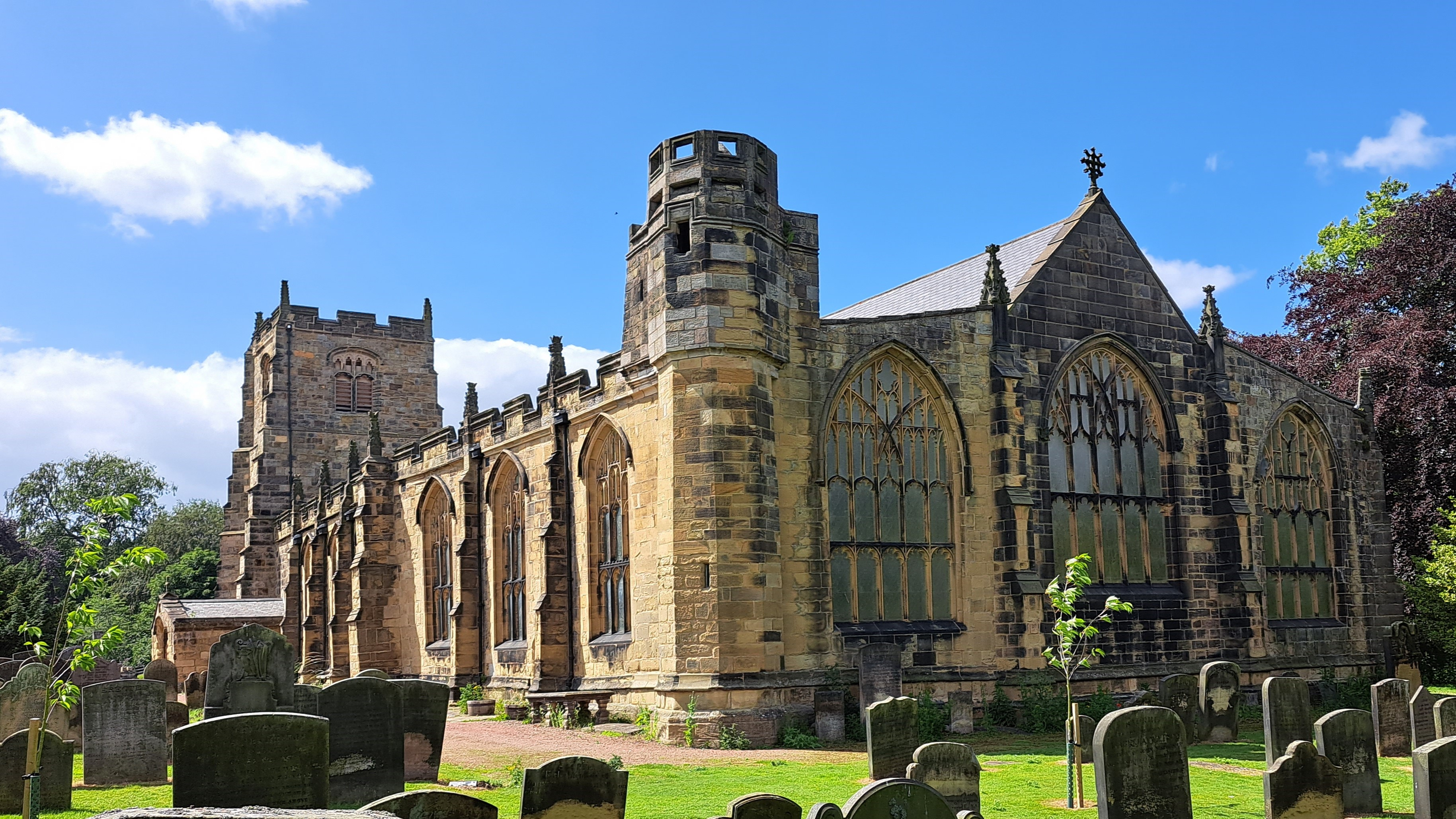
Exterior view from the south-east, centred on the turret

At the south-east corner of the building is a hexagonal turret which originally gave access, via a spiral staircase, to a four-storey roof chamber, fifteen by thirteen feet wide. The walls of this chamber were largely destroyed by later repairs. The purpose of the turret and chamber are unknown, but they may have served a military function during the 15th-century border wars between England and Scotland. A nearby peel tower at Heiferlaw would have housed a beacon to warn of border incursions by the Scots, and the turret at St Michael's may have been part of a relay chain connecting Heiferlaw with Alnwick Castle. On the other hand, the chamber may only have been intended to provide temporary accommodation for priests. The walls of the turret show evidence of having suffered damage from musket balls.

The main tower stands at the west end of the church, on foundations which extend 30 to 40 feet below the surface. It is squat-looking, with deep stepped buttresses, and is capped with battlements and four small pinnacles.

=== Interior ===
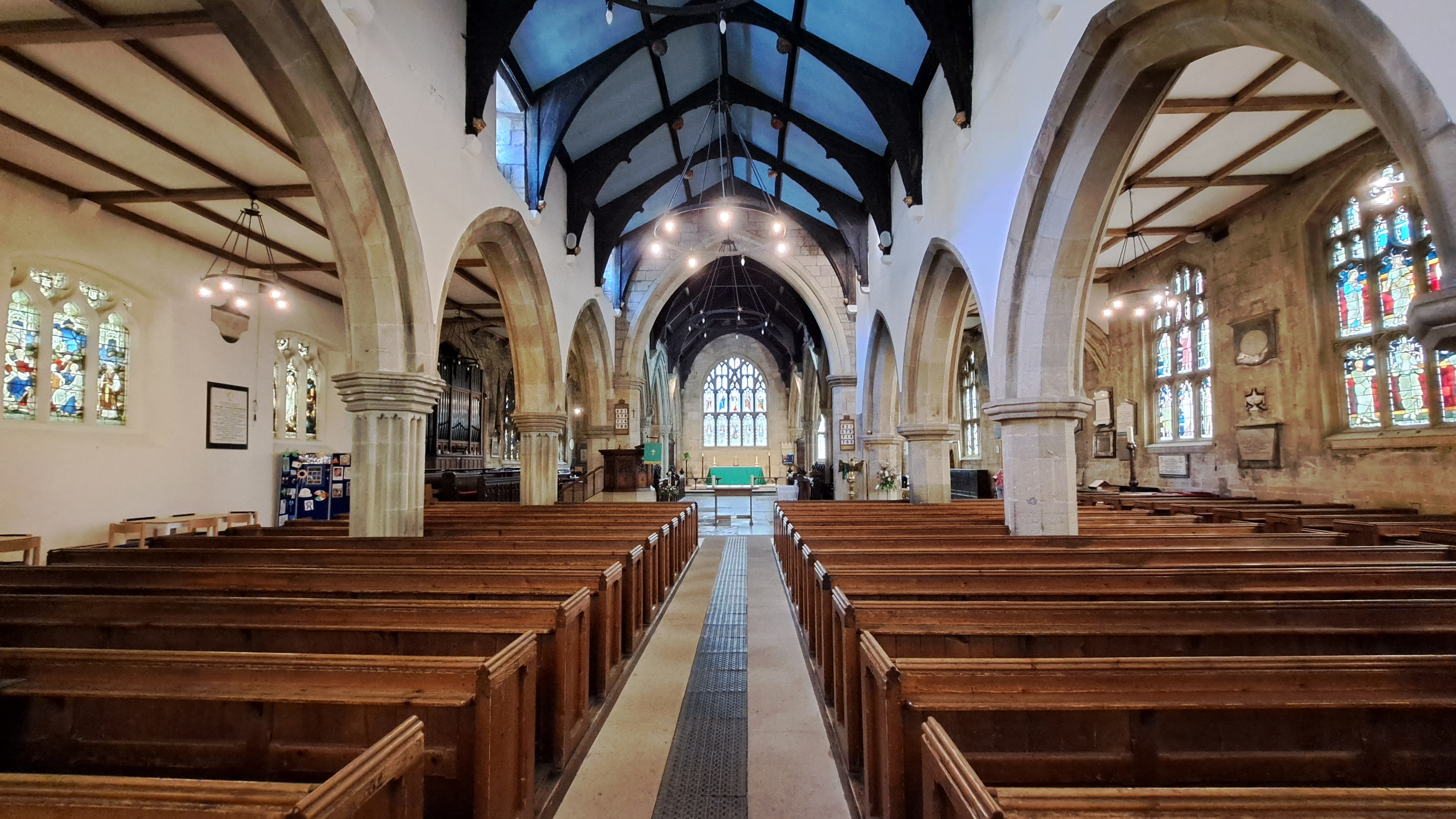
Interior view looking towards the altar

The interior features two statues which were dug up from the foundations during the 1818 restoration. They were minus the heads, and have been given modern replacements. One is of Henry VI and the other one is either Saint Sebastian or Maurice, a local saint martyred by the Danes. There are several medieval grave slabs built into the wall, the oldest of which dates from the 13th century.

Below the west window is the modern font, made from Kilkenny blue-black limestone by David Edwick of Hexham as a gift for the new millennium. A small window to the right of the west window has fragments of glass from the 15th century within it. The rest of the stained glass comes from the 19th century and contains what is described by Nikolaus Pevsner as "an uncommonly complete and enlightening survey of Victorian glass"; it includes work by well-known makers Clayton and Bell, Lavers and Barraud, James Powell and Sons and Ward and Hughes.

The east end of the church features St Catherine's Chapel and the altar. The chapel has an interesting pillar featuring the Percy and de Vesci arms and a carving of St Catherine and the wheel on which she was martyred. It is called the Hotspur Capital and remembers Harry Hotspur, the famous warrior and son of the First Earl.
