= Earl of Beverley =

Earldom in the Peerage of Great Britain

Earl of Beverley, in the County of York, is a title in the Peerage of Great Britain, held by the Duke of Northumberland since 1865. It was created in 1790 for Algernon Percy, 2nd Baron Lovaine. He was the second son of Hugh Percy, 1st Duke of Northumberland. The title of Baron Lovaine, of Alnwick in the County of Northumberland, had been created in the Peerage of Great Britain in 1784 for the first Duke of Northumberland, with a special remainder to his second son, the aforementioned Algernon, who succeeded in the barony on his father's death in 1786. Lord Beverley was succeeded by his son, George, the 2nd Earl, who in 1865 inherited the dukedom of Northumberland from his cousin, the 4th Duke. All three titles have remained united since.

The Honourable Algernon Percy, second son of the first Earl, was a minor diplomat. The Right Reverend the Honourable Hugh Percy, third son of the first Earl, was Bishop of Rochester and of Carlisle. The Honourable Josceline Percy, fourth son of the first Earl, was a vice-admiral in the Royal Navy. The Honourable William Henry Percy, sixth son of the first Earl, was a naval officer and politician.

== Lords Lovaine (1784) ==
- Hugh Percy, 1st Duke of Northumberland, 1st Baron Lovaine (1714–1786)
- Algernon Percy, 2nd Baron Lovaine (1750–1830) (created Earl of Beverley in 1790)

== Earls of Beverley (1790) ==
- Algernon Percy, 1st Earl of Beverley (1750–1830)
- George Percy, 2nd Earl of Beverley (1778–1867) (succeeded as Duke of Northumberland in 1865)

For further succession, see Duke of Northumberland.

Family tree of the Earls and Dukes of Northumberland and Earls of Beverley

King Henry III; 1207–1272
Baron Percy of Alnwick (2nd creation), 1299
Henry de Percy; 1273–1314; 8th Baron Percy of Topcliffe, 1st Baron Percy	Edmund Crouchback; 1245–1296; Earl of Leicester, Earl of Lancaster, Earl of Derby	King Edward I 1239–1307
Henry de Percy; 1300–1351; 9th Baron Percy of Topcliffe, 2nd Baron Percy	Henry c. 1281–1345; Earl of Leicester, Earl of Lancaster, Earl of Derby	King Edward II; 1284–1327
Henry de Percy; 1320–1368; 3rd Baron Percy	Mary of Lancaster c. 1320–1321–1362	Henry of Grosmont c. 1310–1361; Duke of Lancaster, Earl of Lancaster, 4th Earl of Leicester	King Edward III; 1312–1377
Earl of Northumberland (1st creation), 1377	Earl of Worcester
Henry Percy; 1341–1408; 1st Earl of Northumberland, 4th Baron Percy	Thomas Percy; 1343–1403; Earl of Worcester	Blanche of Lancaster; 1342–1368	John of Gaunt; 1340–1399; Duke of Lancaster, Earl of Leicester, Earl of Lancaster, Earl of Derby, Earl of Richmond
(attainted 1405)
Henry Percy "Hotspur" c. 1365–1403	Joan Beaufort c. 1379–1440	John Beaufort c. 1370–1410; Earl of Somerset
Earl of Northumberland (2nd creation), 1416
Henry Percy; 1394–1455; 2nd Earl of Northumberland, 5th Baron Percy	Eleanor Neville c. 1398–1472	Richard Neville; 1400–1460; Earl of Salisbury	John Beaufort; 1404–1444; 1st Duke of Somerset	Edmund Beaufort; 1406–1455; 2nd Duke of Somerset
Earl of Northumberland (3rd creation), 1464
Henry Percy; 1421–1461; 3rd Earl of Northumberland, 6th Baron Percy	John Neville c. 1431–1471; Earl of Northumberland	Eleanor Beaufort; 1431–1501	Margaret Beaufort; 1443–1509
(forfeit 1461)	(released 1470)
(restored 1470)
Henry Percy; 1449–1489; 4th Earl of Northumberland, 7th Baron Percy	King Henry VII; 1457–1509
Henry Algernon Percy; 1478–1527; 5th Earl of Northumberland, 8th Baron Percy	Katherine Spencer; 1477–1542	Mary Tudor (Queen of France); 1496–1533 m.(2) Charles Brandon; Duke of Suffolk	Margaret Tudor; 1489–1541
Duke of Northumberland (1st creation), 1551
Henry Percy; 1502–1537; 6th Earl of Northumberland, 9th Baron Percy	Thomas Percy c. 1504–1537	John Dudley; 1504–1553; 1st Duke of Northumberland	Frances Brandon; 1517–1559 m. Henry Grey; Duke of Suffolk	James V of Scotland; 1512–1542
(attainted 1537)	(extinct 1553)
Earl of Northumberland (2nd creation) restored and Baron Percy of Alnwick (3rd creation), 1557
Thomas Percy; 1528–1572; 7th Earl of Northumberland, 1st Baron Percy	Henry Percy; 1532–1585; 8th Earl of Northumberland, 2nd Baron Percy	Guildford Dudley c. 1535–1554	Jane Grey c. 1537–1554	Lady Katherine Grey; 1540–1568 m. Edward Seymour; Earl of Hertford	Mary, Queen of Scots; 1542–1587
Henry Percy; 1564–1632; 9th Earl of Northumberland, 3rd Baron Percy	Edward Seymour; 1561–1612; Viscount Beauchamp	King James VI and I 1566–1625
Algernon Percy; 1602–1668; 10th Earl of Northumberland, 4th Baron Percy	Francis Seymour c. 1590–1664; Baron Seymour of Trowbridge	King Charles I 1600–1649
Josceline Percy; 1644–1670; 11th Earl of Northumberland, 5th Baron Percy	Charles Seymour c. 1621–1665; Baron Seymour of Trowbridge	King Charles II; 1630–1685
Earldom of Northumberland and Barony Percy extinct, 1670
Earl of Northumberland (4th creation), Viscount Falmouth (1st creation), and Baron of Pontefract, 1674; Duke of Northumberland (2nd creation), 1683
Elizabeth Seymour; 1667–1722	Charles Seymour; 1662–1748; Duke of Somerset	George FitzRoy; 1665–1716; Duke of Northumberland, Earl of Northumberland, Viscount Falmouth, Baron of Pontefract
Earldom of Northumberland and Dukedom of Northumberland extinct, 1716
Baron Percy (4th creation) created erroneously, 1722; Earl of Northumberland (5th creation) and Baron Warkworth, 1749
Algernon Seymour; 1684–1750; Duke of Somerset, 1st Earl of Northumberland and Baron Warkworth, 1st Baron Percy
Duke of Northumberland (3rd creation), 1766; Lord Lovaine, Baron of Alnwick in the County of Northumberland
Hugh Percy formerly Hugh Smithson; 1714–1786; 1st Duke of Northumberland, 2nd Earl of Northumberland and Baron Warkworth, 1st Baron Lovaine, 4th Baronet Smithson	Elizabeth Seymour; 1716–1776; 2nd Baroness Percy suo jure
Earl of Beverley, 1790
Hugh Percy; 1742–1817; 2nd Duke of Northumberland, 3rd Earl of Northumberland and Baron Warkworth, 3rd Baron Percy	Algernon Percy; 1750–1830; 1st Earl of Beverley, 2nd Baron Lovaine
Baron Prudhoe, of Prudhoe Castle in the County of Northumberland, 1814
Hugh Percy; 1785–1847; 3rd Duke of Northumberland, 4th Earl of Northumberland and Baron Warkworth, 4th Baron Percy	Emily Frances Percy; 1789–1844	Algernon Percy; 1792–1865; 4th Duke of Northumberland, 5th Earl of Northumberland and Baron Warkworth, 1st Baron Prudhoe, 5th Baron Percy	George Percy; 1778–1867; 5th Duke of Northumberland, 6th Earl of Northumberland and Baron Warkworth, 2nd Earl of Beverley, 3rd Baron Lovaine
Barony Prudhoe extinct, 1865
George Augustus Frederick John Murray; 1814–1864; 6th Duke of Atholl, 11th Baron Strange	Algernon George Percy; 1810–1899; 6th Duke of Northumberland, 7th Earl of Northumberland and Baron Warkworth, 3rd Earl of Beverley, 4th Baron Lovaine
John James Hugh Henry Stewart-Murray; 1840–1917; 7th Duke of Atholl, 12th Baron Strange, 6th Baron Percy	Henry George Percy; 1846–1918; 7th Duke of Northumberland, 8th Earl of Northumberland and Baron Warkworth, 4th Earl of Beverley, 5th Baron Lovaine
John George Stewart-Murray; 1871–1942; 8th Duke of Atholl, 13th Baron Strange, 7th Baron Percy	James Thomas Stewart-Murray; 1879–1957; 9th Duke of Atholl, 14th Baron Strange, 8th Baron Percy	Alan Ian Percy; 1880–1930; 8th Duke of Northumberland, 9th Earl of Northumberland and Baron Warkworth, 5th Earl of Beverley, 6th Baron Lovaine
Henry George Alan Percy; 1912–1940; 9th Duke of Northumberland, 10th Earl of Northumberland and Baron Warkworth, 6th Earl of Beverley, 7th Baron Lovaine	Hugh Algernon Percy; 1914–1988; 10th Duke of Northumberland, 11th Earl of Northumberland and Baron Warkworth, 7th Earl of Beverley, 8th Baron Lovaine, 9th Baron Percy
Henry Alan Walter Richard Percy; 1953–1995; 11th Duke of Northumberland, 12th Earl of Northumberland and Baron Warkworth, 8th Earl of Beverley, 9th Baron Lovaine, 10th Baron Percy	Ralph George Algernon Percy b. 1956; 12th Duke of Northumberland, 13th Earl of Northumberland and Baron Warkworth, 9th Earl of Beverley, 10th Baron Lovaine, 11th Baron Percy
George Dominic Percy b. 1984 styled Earl Percy
Heir apparent to the Dukedom of Northumberland
