= Algernon Percy (diplomat) =

British diplomat

The Honourable Algernon Percy

Minister Plenipotentiary to the Confederated States of the Swiss Cantons
- In office 1825-1832

Personal details
- Born: 1779
- Died: 1833 (aged 53–54)
- Children: 2+
- Parents: Algernon Percy (father); Isabella Burrell (mother)
- Relatives: Charlotte Ashburnham (sister); George Percy (brother); Hugh Percy (brother); Josceline Percy (brother); Henry Percy (brother); William Henry Percy (brother); Hugh Percy (grandfather); Elizabeth Percy (grandmother); Peter Burrell (grandfather)

The Honourable Algernon Percy (1779–1833), was a British diplomat.

Percy was the second son of Algernon Percy, 1st Earl of Beverley and Isabella Burrell, daughter of Peter Burrell. He was Minister Plenipotentiary to the Confederated States of the Swiss Cantons from 1825 to 1832, succeeding Charles Richard Vaughan.

== Family ==
There is no record of Percy ever marrying. He does appear to have fathered two daughters by a Luise Verena Tschannen in Bern, Switzerland, for whom he made provision in his will, there being additional evidence in Percy being named as the father in the baptismal record of the elder daughter, Emelia. It is unlikely that Percy married Anne-Marie FitzGerald, illegitimate daughter of Lord Charles FitzGerald, 1st Baron Lecale, as some sources suggest, as there is evidence in the Cooney Family Genealogy that she married a stable hand in Kildare and migrated to the United States.

Diplomatic posts
Preceded by Charles Richard Vaughan	Minister Plenipotentiary to the Swiss Cantons; 1825–1832	Succeeded by David Richard Morier
