= Isabella Percy, Countess of Beverley =

English noble (1750-1812)

Isabella Susan Percy Countess of Beverley
- Born: 19 December 1750; Kent, England
- Died: 24 January 1812 (aged 61)
- Spouse: Algernon Percy (m. 1775–1812)
- Children: 13; Charlotte Ashburnham, Countess of Ashburnham; Elizabeth Percy; George Percy, 5th Duke of Northumberland; Algernon Percy; Lady Susanna Percy; Hugh Percy; Josceline Percy; Henry Percy; Lady Emily Drummond; William Henry Percy; Francis John Percy; Lord Charles Percy; Lady Louisa Percy
- Parents: Peter Burrell (father); Elizabeth Lewis (mother)
- Relatives: Peter Burrell, 1st Baron Gwydyr (brother); Frances Burrell (sister); Elizabeth Burrell (sister)

Isabella Susan Percy, Countess of Beverley (19 December 1750 – 24 January 1812), formerly Isabella Susan (or Susannah) Burrell, was the wife of Algernon Percy, 1st Earl of Beverley, and the mother of the 5th Duke of Northumberland.

Isabella was the second daughter of Peter Burrell, a barrister, of Beckenham, Kent, and his wife, the former Elizabeth Lewis. Her brother was Peter Burrell, 1st Baron Gwydyr. Two of her sisters married into the aristocracy: Elizabeth, who married the Duke of Hamilton (and later the Marquess of Exeter), and Frances, who became Duchess of Northumberland.

Isabella married the future earl on 8 June 1775, by special licence, at Syon House in London. Their children were:

- Lady Charlotte Percy (1776-1862), who married George Ashburnham, 3rd Earl of Ashburnham, and had children.
- Lady Elizabeth Percy (1777-1779), who died in infancy and was buried within the Northumberland Vault in Westminster Abbey.
- George Percy, later 5th Duke of Northumberland (1778–1867), who married Louisa Harcourt Stuart-Wortley and had children
- Hon. Algernon Percy (1779–1833), diplomat, who married Anne-Marie Prestilly-FitzGerald and had children
- [a child](stillborn)(1781)
- Lady Susanna Percy (born 1782)
- Hon. Hugh Percy (1784–1856), later Bishop of Rochester and Carlisle, who married Mary Manners-Sutton and had children
- Hon. Josceline Percy (1784–1856), naval commander, who married Sophia Walhouse and had four children.
- Hon. Henry Percy (1785–1825), army officer, who died unmarried but with two illegitimate children by Marion Durand: Major-General Sir Henry Marion Durand and Percy Durand. Sir Henry Durand's son was created a baronet in 1892.
- Lady Emily Charlotte Percy (1786-1877), who married Andrew Mortimer Drummond.
- Hon. William Henry Percy (1788–1855), politician and naval commander
- Hon. Francis John Percy (1790–1812), army officer.
- Lord Charles Greatheed Bertie Percy (1794–1870), MP, who married Ann Caroline Greatheed, the granddaughter of Bertie Greatheed, and had one child
- Lady Louisa Margaret Percy (1796-1796), who died in infancy and is buried within the Northumberland Vault in Westminster Abbey.

In 1786, Percy inherited the title of Lord Lovaine, and his wife became Lady Lovaine. In 1790, he was created 1st Earl of Beverley, and his wife became Countess of Beverley. The countess died in 1812, aged 61, and was buried in the Northumberland Vault at Westminster Abbey.

The Earl of Beverley died in October 1830, aged 80, and was succeeded by his eldest son, George, who later inherited the dukedom of Northumberland from his cousin, the 4th Duke, in 1865.
