= William Henry Percy =

British naval officer and politician

Rear-Admiral The Honourable William Henry Percy

Member of Parliament for Stamford
- In office 1818-1826

Personal details
- Born: 24 March 1788
- Died: 5 October 1855 (aged 67) London, England
- Parents: Algernon Percy (father); Isabella Burrell (mother)
- Relatives: Charlotte Ashburnham (sister); George Percy (brother); Hugh Percy (brother); Josceline Percy (brother); Henry Percy (brother); Algernon Percy (brother); Hugh Percy (grandfather); Elizabeth Percy (grandmother); Peter Burrell (grandfather)
- Military career
- Service: Royal Navy
- Rank: Rear-Admiral
- Units: HMS Lion; HMS Medusa
- Commands: HMS Mermaid; HMS Hermes
- Wars: Peninsular War; War of 1812

William Henry Percy (24 March 1788 – 5 October 1855) was a British Royal Navy officer and politician.

== Family ==
Percy was the sixth son of Algernon Percy, 1st Earl of Beverley, and his wife, the former Isabella Susannah Burrell, daughter of Peter Burrell.

== Naval and political career ==
Entering the navy as a first-class volunteer on board the 64 gun HMS Lion in May 1801 and going with it to China, Percy returned in November 1802 and was posted to HMS Medusa as a midshipman. (Soon afterwards, his elder brother Josceline was appointed its appointed acting lieutenant.) He was promoted to Lieutenant in 1807. Promoted to commander in 1810, his first command was the troopship HMS Mermaid in 1811. Percy and Mermaid transported troops between Britain and Iberia for the Peninsular War).

He was made post captain on 21 March 1812, but his next command (of the 20 gun HMS Hermes during 1814, operating on the North American coast) came to grief when he lost 50 of his crew wounded or killed in an unsuccessful attack on Fort Bowyer, Mobile and then had to set fire to his own ship to keep her out of enemy hands. A court martial determined that the attack was warranted by the circumstances. Still, this was his last naval service, though he did carry back to England despatches announcing the British defeat at the Battle of New Orleans.

For a while during his retirement he was a commissioner of excise and - thanks to the influence of his maternal aunt's stepson, the second Marquess of Exeter - he sat as Tory MP for Stamford, Lincolnshire from 1818 to 1826. He resigned from Parliament in order to take up an excise appointment, worth £1,200 a year. He was made a rear-admiral on the retired list on 1 October 1846.

Percy died unmarried in October 1855, aged 67, at 8 Portman Square, London, his eldest brother's home.

Parliament of the United Kingdom
Preceded by The Lord Henniker; Evan Foulkes	Member of Parliament for Stamford; 1818 – 1826; With: Lord Thomas Cecil	Succeeded by Lord Thomas Cecil; Thomas Chaplin
