= Duchess of Northumberland =

Some women to have held the title Duchess of Northumberland, as wives of the Duke of Northumberland, include:

First creation

- Jane Dudley, Duchess of Northumberland (1508/9–1555), (née Guildford), wife of the duke

Third creation

- Elizabeth Percy, Duchess of Northumberland (1716–1776), (née Seymour), wife of the 1st duke
- Frances Percy, Duchess of Northumberland (1752–1820), (née Burrell), wife of the 2nd duke
- Charlotte Percy, Duchess of Northumberland (1787–1866), (née Clive), wife of the 3rd duke
- Eleanor Percy, Duchess of Northumberland (1820–1911), (née Grosvenor), wife of the 4th duke
- Helen Percy, Duchess of Northumberland (1886–1965), (née Lennox-Gordon), wife of the 8th duke
- Elizabeth Percy, Duchess of Northumberland (1922–2012), (née Montagu Douglas Scott), wife of the 10th duke
- Jane Percy, Duchess of Northumberland (born 1958), wife of the 12th duke
