= Josceline Percy (Royal Navy officer) =

Vice-Admiral Josceline Percy CB
- Born: 29 January 1784; London
- Died: 19 October 1856 (aged 72) Rickmansworth, Hertfordshire
- Allegiance: United Kingdom
- Branch: Royal Navy
- Rank: Vice-Admiral
- Commands: HMS Espoir; Volontaire; HMS Comus; HMS Nymphe; HMS Hotspur; Cape of Good Hope Station; Sheerness; Nore Command

Vice-Admiral Josceline Percy CB (29 January 1784 – 19 October 1856) was a Royal Navy officer and politician who went on to be Commander-in-Chief, The Nore.

== Family ==
Josceline Percy was the fourth son of Algernon Percy, second Baron Lovaine of Alnwick (1750–1830), and his wife Isabella Susannah Burrell.

Through his father he was the grandson of Hugh Percy, 1st Duke of Northumberland, and through his mother the grandson of Peter Burrell of Beckenham, Kent. His maternal uncle was Peter Burrell, 1st Baron Gwydyr, and Henry Percy (1785–1825) and William Henry Percy (1788–1855, another naval officer) were his younger brothers.

== Life ==
Born with a twin brother (Hugh, 1784–1856), Percy's first naval service began in February 1797, on Lord Hugh Seymour's flagship HMS Sans Pareil. Next he served on HMS Amphion from 1801 to 1803 in the Mediterranean and – whilst in that theatre of war – transferred (with Nelson and Hardy) into HMS Victory. From there he was made HMS Medusa's acting lieutenant (under Captain John Gore, who was later knighted) in August 1803, and his assistance in her capture of Spanish treasure ships on 5 October 1804 led to that commission being confirmed the following 30 April.

He moved to HMS Diadem sometime before 1806, for he was in that ship that year with Sir Home Riggs Popham during Cape Town's capture and was promoted from it to his first independent command came on 13 January 1806, over the brig HMS Espoir. To reach that ship he was posted to the Dutch ship Bato, then thought to be in Simon's Bay, but – finding the Bato destroyed and that the Espoir had already sailed back to England – he had no choice but to return to the Diadem. The French 46-gun frigate Volontaire arrived in Table Bay on 4 March (not knowing the British had captured the Cape), and was seized, commissioned into the Royal Navy, and put under Percy's command, with orders to reach St Helena and head a convoy then returning to England. He also received confirmation of his two promotions of 1806, which were given the dates of 22 January and 25 September 1806 respectively. On arrival in England, he became the Tory Member of Parliament for Beer Alston, Devon (a 'pocket borough' of his father's), a role he held until 1820.

He assisted at the occupation of Madeira by Sir Samuel Hood in 1807 (commanding the 22 gun HMS Comus). To meet the terms of the convention of Cintra, requiring all defeated French forces to be returned to France, he transported the French general Junot from Portugal to La Rochelle in 1808, during his captaincy of the 36 gun HMS Nymphe. He commanded the frigate HMS Hotspur along the coast of France (and later at Rio de Janeiro and Buenos Aires) from November 1810 to the end of 1815, when he sailed back to England.

He was appointed a Companion of the Order of the Bath on 26 September 1831, on the occasion of King William IV's Coronation Honours. On 23 November 1841, he was promoted to rear-admiral, acting as the Commander-in-Chief, Cape of Good Hope Station (November 1841 – spring 1846) and Commander-in-Chief, Sheerness (June 1851 – June 1854), having been promoted to vice-admiral on 29 April 1851. He was appointed Commander-in-Chief, The Nore, in 1851.

== Marriage and issue ==
On 9 December 1820, he married Sophia Elizabeth Walhouse (died 13 December 1875), daughter of Moreton Walhouse of Hatherton, Staffordshire, and sister of Lord Hatherton. One son and three daughters were born of the marriage. The only son Alan (1825–1845) died young; of the daughters

- Sophia Louisa Percy (24 December 1821 Hatherton – 7 November 1908), author of Links with the Past (1901) (text) married 7 July 1846 Col. Charles Bagot (20 May 1806 – 25 February 1881), son of Sir Charles Bagot of a prominent aristocratic family, and had issue, three sons, including Richard Bagot (1860–1921), their fourth and last child, and an only daughter and eldest child Alice Mary Bagot (died 1922). The present Bagots of Levens Hall, Westmorland are descended (through an heiress) from Josceline, the eldest son of Charles and Sophia Bagot.
- Emily Percy (12 September 1826 – 17 December 1919) married 17 July 1852, Gen. Sir Charles Lawrence d’Aguilar, G.C.B. (died 2 November 1912), and had issue, 1 daughter.
- Charlotte Alice Percy (17 July 1831 – 26 May 1916) who in 1858 married her first cousin Edward Percy Thompson (1837 – October 1879), himself son of Ellen Percy, herself fourth youngest daughter of Hugh Percy, Bishop of Carlisle (twin brother of the subject of this entry), and had issue, two sons and three daughters. The eldest daughter Grace Anne Thompson (died 1960) married 1892 her (double) second cousin Capt. Josceline Hugh Percy (1856–1910), 7th and youngest son of Rev. Henry Percy, himself the second son of Bishop Hugh, and had issue two sons and two daughters.

== See also ==
- O'Byrne, William Richard (1849). "Percy, Josceline" . A Naval Biographical Dictionary . John Murray – via Wikisource.

== Sources ==
Parliament of the United Kingdom
Preceded by William Mitford; Lord Lovaine	Member of Parliament for Bere Alston; 1806–1820; With: Lord Lovaine	Succeeded by Lord Lovaine; Henry Percy
Military offices
Preceded by Sir Edward Durnford King	Commander-in-Chief, Cape of Good Hope Station; 1841–1846	Succeeded by James Dacres
Preceded by Sir George Elliot	Commander-in-Chief, The Nore; 1851–1854	Succeeded by William Gordon
