= Admiral Percy =

Admiral Percy may refer to:

- Algernon Percy, 10th Earl of Northumberland (1602–1668), English Lord High Admiral
- Henry Percy, 1st Earl of Northumberland (1341–1408), English Admiral of the Northern Seas
- Josceline Percy (Royal Navy officer) (1784–1856), British Royal Navy vice admiral
- Thomas Percy, Earl of Worcester (1343–1403), English Admiral of the Kings Fleet in Ireland
- William Henry Percy (1788–1855), British Royal Navy rear admiral
