= Douglas Hamilton, 8th Duke of Hamilton =

Scottish nobleman (1756–1799)

His Grace The Duke of Hamilton KT
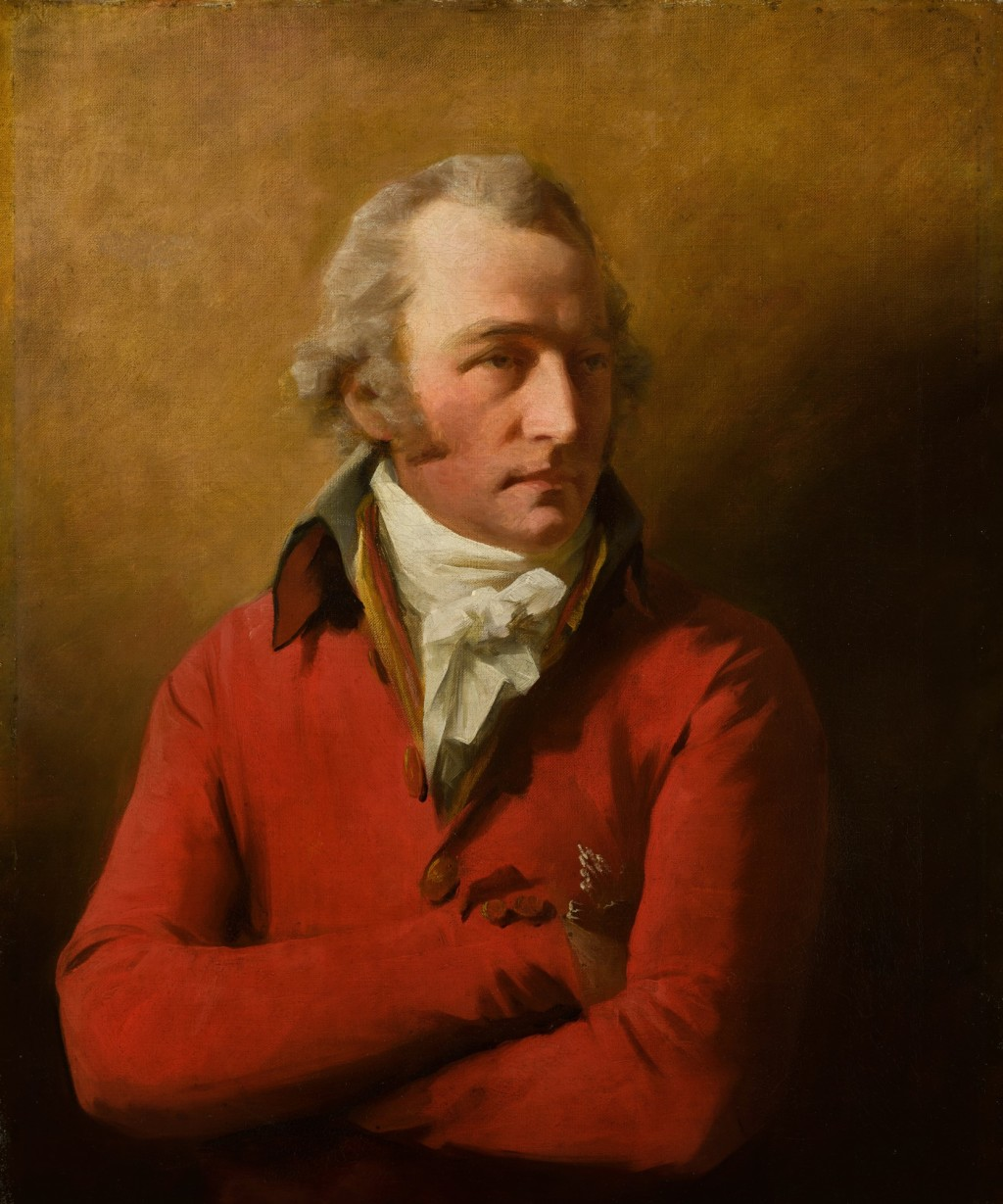
- Portrait by Henry Raeburn

Personal details
- Born: 24 July 1756; Palace of Holyroodhouse, Edinburgh, Scotland
- Died: 2 August 1799 (aged 43); Hamilton Palace, South Lanarkshire, Scotland
- Spouse: Elizabeth Anne Burrell
- Parent(s): James Hamilton, 6th Duke of Hamilton; Elizabeth Gunning

Douglas Hamilton, 8th Duke of Hamilton, 5th Duke of Brandon and 2nd Baron Hamilton of Hameldon, KT (24 July 1756 – 2 August 1799) was a Scottish peer, nobleman, and politician.

== Life ==
Hamilton was born at the Palace of Holyroodhouse, the son of the 6th Duke of Hamilton and his wife, Elizabeth Gunning. He attended Eton from 1763 to 1767 and on the death of his brother in 1769, he succeeded to the title of Duke of Hamilton. He also inherited his mother's title of Baron Hamilton of Hameldon when she died in 1790.

Between 1772 and 1776, he lived in Europe with Dr. John Moore and his son, the future Lieutenant-Colonel Sir John Moore, hero of Corunna. On his return, aged 21, he married Elizabeth Anne Burrell (b. 20 April 1757), fourth daughter of Peter Burrell, in London on 5 April 1778. The new Duchess was a sister of the future 1st Baron Gwydyr, the Countess of Beverley, and the future Duchess of Northumberland.

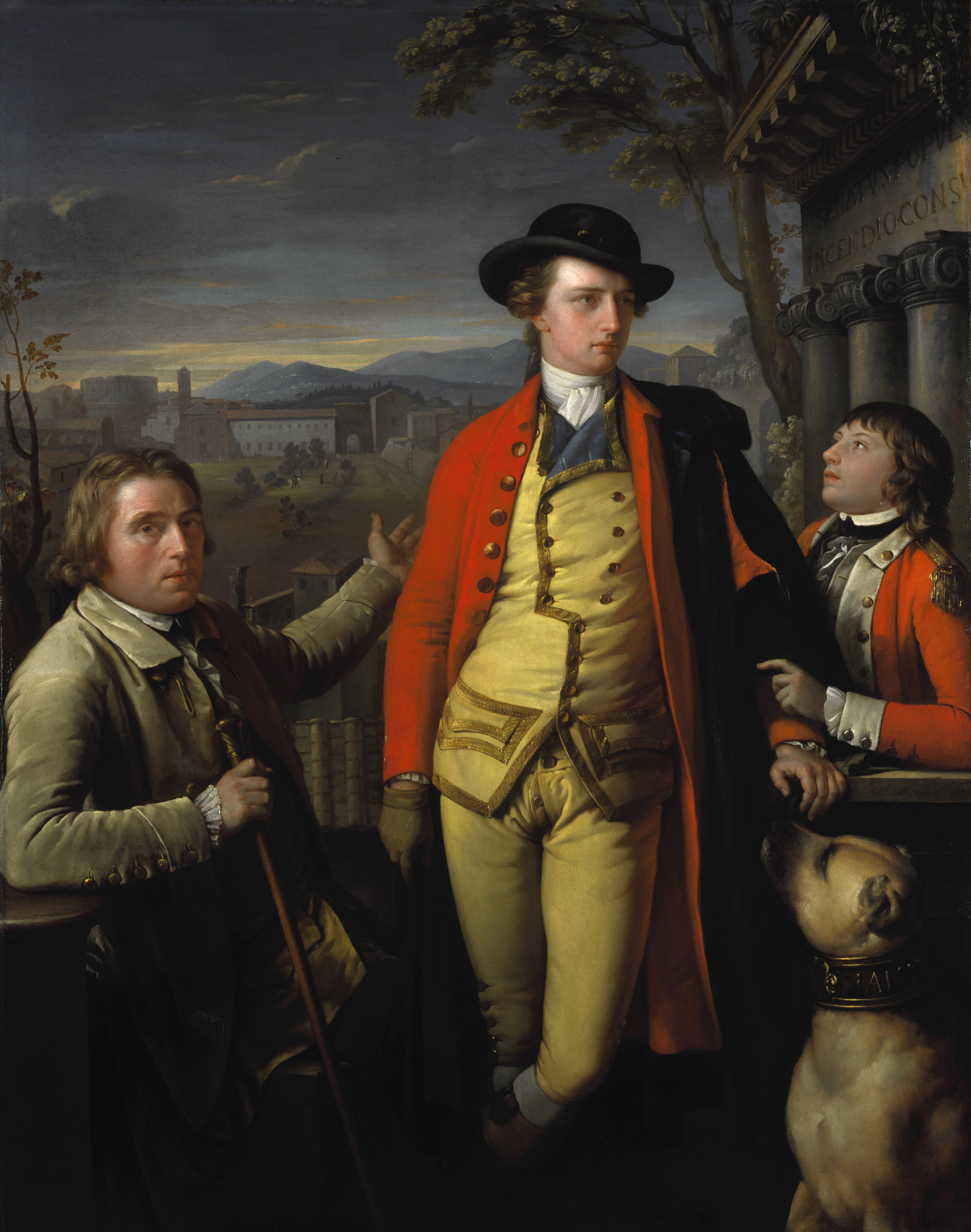
Portrait of Douglas Douglas-Hamilton, 8th Duke of Hamilton, in the company of Dr. John Moore and his son John Moore on Grand Tour by Gavin Hamilton, 1775–1777, Scottish National Portrait Gallery

Hamilton's mother disapproved of the match, possibly because she had hoped for a better match for her handsome son. The Duchess of Argyll was of the opinion that "the daughter of a private gentleman, however accomplished, was not qualified to be allied to her" even though she herself had been a mere Miss Gunning and Irish at that.

=== Marriage breakdown ===
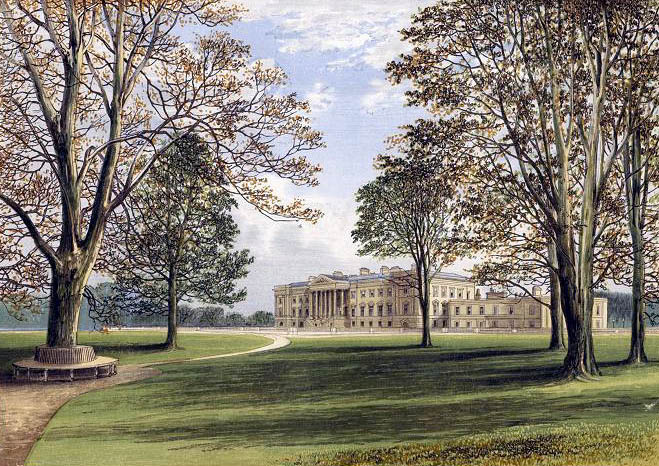
Hamilton Palace

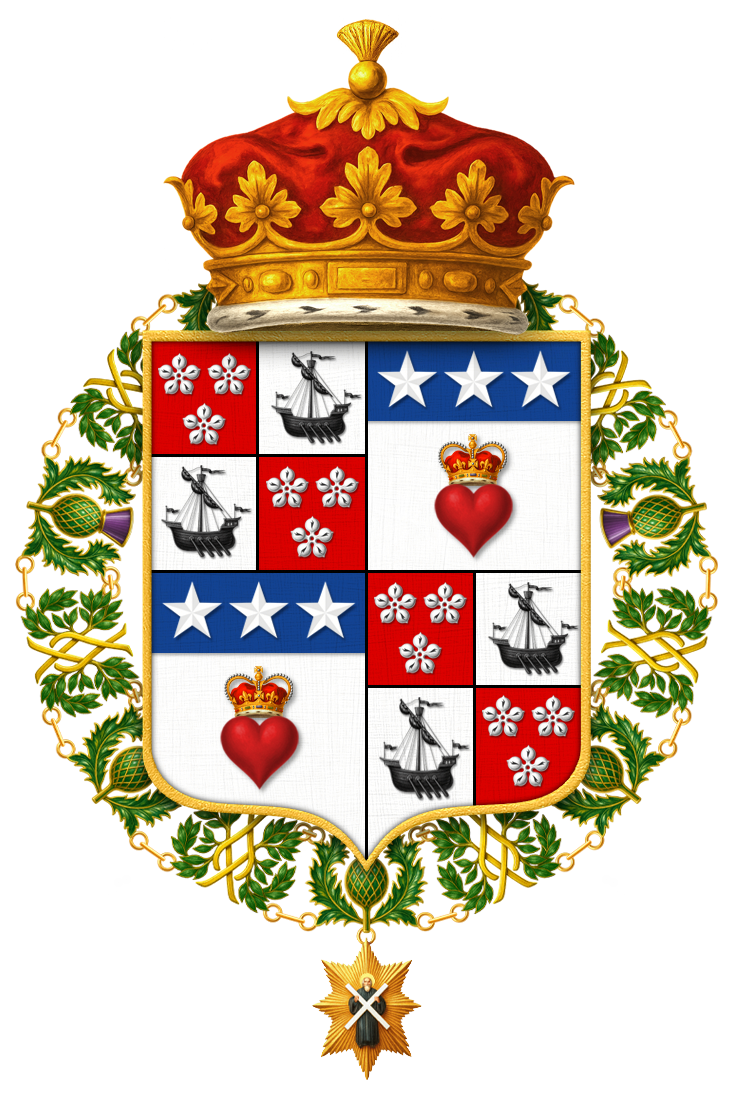
Shield of arms of Douglas Hamilton, 8th Duke of Hamilton, KT

The Duke gradually sank into dissipation. In 1794, the couple eventually divorced, by Act of Parliament after 16 years of marriage. The Duchess initiated the divorce on the grounds of his adultery with actress Mrs. Esten since 1793, but also previous adultery with an unnamed lady (Frances Twysden, wife of the Earl of Eglinton and sister of the Countess of Jersey) since 1787. Lord Eglinton had divorced his wife 6 February 1788 on grounds of her adultery with the Duke, after she had borne a child, possibly Lady Susannah Montgomerie (1788–1805) supposed to be the Duke's. Thus, the Duchess could have used the Eglinton divorce to support her own case. However, she did not, and used a later dalliance with a virtually unknown actress. The 1794 divorce is a curious one, and apparently one agreed on beforehand, according to Lawrence Stone in his book Alienated Affections: Divorce and Separation in Scotland 1684–1830. The Duke did not defend, and the Duchess obtained her divorce since she had left her husband a year earlier.

The Duke died without remarrying, even though he and Harriet Pye Esten had a daughter in 1796, Anne (1796–20 August 1844), who went on to marry Henry Westenra, 3rd Baron Rossmore.

The Duchess remarried one year after his death, to the 1st Marquess of Exeter (d. 1804) as his third wife. She had no children, and died on 17 January 1837.

Hamilton died in 1799, aged 43 at Hamilton Palace and was buried in the family mausoleum at Hamilton, Scotland. Without legitimate issue, his ducal title passed to his uncle, Archibald and his barony passed to his half-brother, George. The Duke however left the contents of Hamilton Palace to his illegitimate daughter by Mrs. Esten, Anne Douglas-Hamilton, later Lady Rossmore (died without issue). The new Duke was forced to buy them back.

The Duke is also noted for being an early patron of the future Sir John Moore, hero of Corruna, whose parliamentary and military career was sponsored by the Hamiltons from 1779. The dance "Hamilton House" is also said to be named for the 8th Duke and his Duchess, with the changes of partner echoing the infidelities of both. Finally, the Duke was the first Duke of Hamilton to be seated in Parliament as Duke of Brandon (a title in the Peerage of Great Britain that entitled him to a seat in the House of Lords, not as a Scottish representative peer).

Peerage of Scotland
Preceded by James Hamilton	Duke of Hamilton; 1769–1799	Succeeded by Archibald Hamilton
Peerage of Great Britain
Preceded by James Hamilton	Duke of Brandon; 1769–1799	Succeeded by Archibald Hamilton
Preceded by Elizabeth Campbell	Baron Hamilton of Hameldon; 1790–1799	Succeeded by George Campbell
Honorary titles
New office	Lord Lieutenant of Lanarkshire; 1794–1799	Succeeded by The Duke of Hamilton
