= Richard Bagot (writer) =

English novelist and essayist

Richard Bagot (8 November 1860 – 11 or 12 December 1921) was an English novelist and essayist with a prominent Italian background. He was known most widely for his articles and reviews of Italian art and letters. His best known works of fiction were Donna Diana, Love's Proxy, and The Passport. To many, however, he was known solely as the writer of My Italian Year and of other books and articles on the land he visited many times. He held high honors in Italy, and was a member of the more important Italian clubs.^{[5]}

== Family history ==
Bagot was the member of a well-known family-line of Staffordshire. He was the fourth child of Col. Charles (1801–1881) and Sophia Louisa (Percy; d. 1908) Bagot, the daughter of Vice-Admiral Josceline Percy, son of Algernon Percy, 1st Earl of Beverley. His great grandfather was William Bagot, 1st Baron Bagot. His great uncle, also named Richard Bagot (1782–1854), was Dean of Canterbury and Bishop of Oxford. His father was a Justice of the Peace for the county, and also the Assistant Master of Ceremonies to HM Queen Victoria.^{[3]}

== Awards and recognition ==
In 1917, Bagot was presented with an illuminated address of appreciation from the Italian nation signed by the Cabinet, Senate, and Chamber of Deputies and leaders of Italian science, literature, art and industry.^{[4]} He was invested as a Grand Officer in the Order of the Crown of Italy, and as a Knight in the Sovereign Military Order of Malta.^{[3]}

Bagot died at his home in Milnthorpe, Westmorland, England.^{[4]}

== Works ==
- A Roman Mystery (1899)
- The Just And The Unjust (1901)
- Casting Of Nets (1901)
- Donna Diana (1902)
- Love's Proxy (1904)
- The Passport (1905)
- Temptation (1907)
- Anthony Cuthbert (1908)
- Lakes Of Northern Italy (1908)
- The House Of Serravalle (1910)
- My Italian Year (1911)
- Italians Of To-day (1912)
- Darneley Place (1912)
- The Gods Decide (1919)
