= George Percy, 5th Duke of Northumberland =

British politician

His Grace The Duke of Northumberland PC
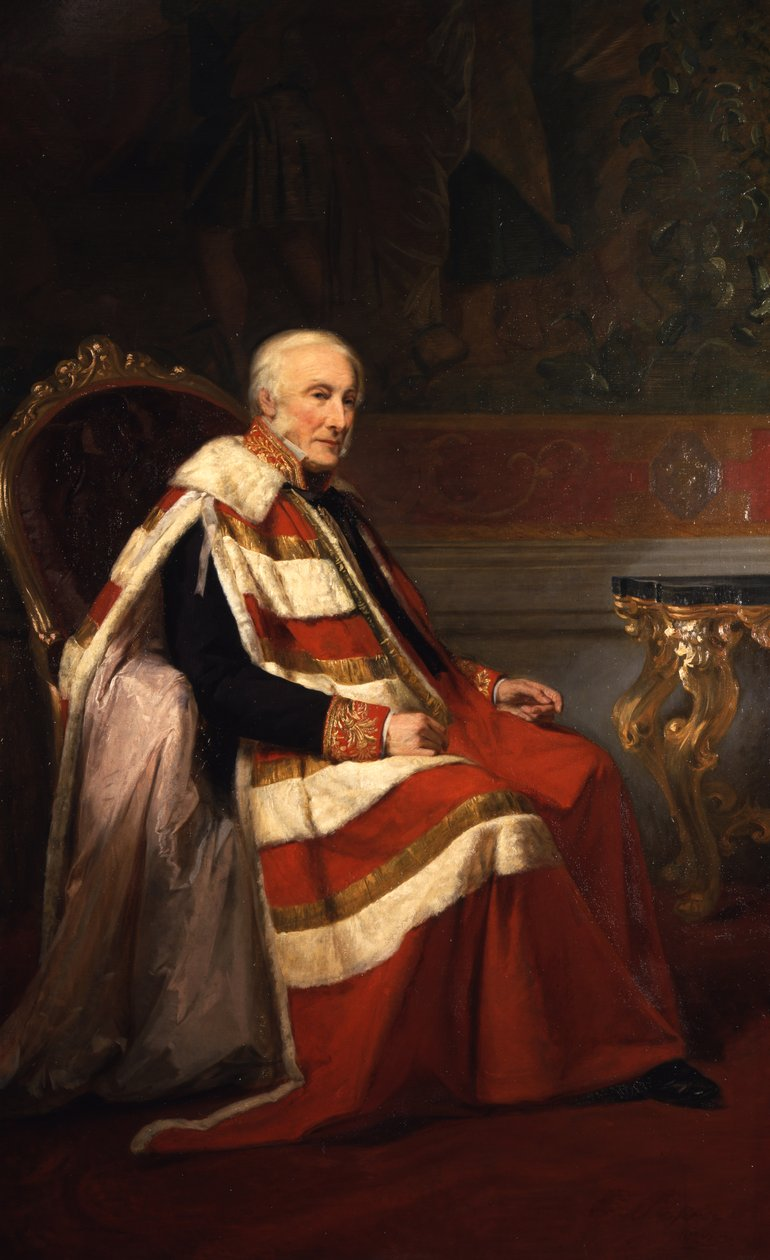
- Portrait of the Duke of Northumberland.

Captain of the Yeomen of the Guard
- In office 15 January 1842 – June 1846
- Monarch: Victoria
- Prime Minister: Sir Robert Peel, Bt
- Preceded by: The Marquess of Lothian
- Succeeded by: The Viscount Falkland

Member of Parliament for Bere Alston
- In office 1799–1830
- Preceded by: John Mitford
- Succeeded by: David Lyon

Personal details
- Born: 22 June 1778
- Died: 22 August 1867 (aged 89)
- Party: Tory
- Spouse(s): Louisa Stuart-Wortley (d. 1848)
- Children: 9, including Algernon, Josceline, and Henry
- Parent(s): Algernon Percy, 1st Earl of Beverley; Susan Burrell

George Percy, 5th Duke of Northumberland PC (22 June 1778 – 22 August 1867), styled Lord Lovaine between 1790 and 1830 and known as the Earl of Beverley between 1830 and 1865, was a British Tory politician. He served as Captain of the Yeomen of the Guard under Sir Robert Peel between 1842 and 1846. He succeeded to his peerage on 12 February 1865, after the death of his childless cousin Algernon Percy.

== Background ==
Born in London, he was the eldest son of Algernon Percy, 1st Earl of Beverley, second son of Hugh Percy, 1st Duke of Northumberland. His mother was Susan Isabella, daughter of Peter Burrell, while Algernon Percy, The Right Reverend Hugh Percy (Bishop of Rochester and Carlisle), Josceline Percy and William Henry Percy were his younger brothers. He was educated at St John's College, Cambridge, graduating with a Master of Arts in 1799.

== Political career ==
Northumberland was returned to parliament for the rotten borough of Bere Alston in 1799, a seat he held until 1830, when he succeeded his father in the earldom and entered the House of Lords. From 1804, he served as a Lord of the Treasury for the next two years. He was sworn of the Privy Council in January 1842 and was appointed Captain of the Yeomen of the Guard (Deputy Chief Whip in the House of Lords) by Sir Robert Peel, a post he held until the government fell in 1846. In February 1865, at the age of 86, he succeeded his first cousin as 5th Duke of Northumberland.

Northumberland was also a president of the Royal National Lifeboat Institution.

== Family ==
Northumberland married Louisa, third daughter of James Stuart-Wortley-Mackenzie, on 22 June 1801. Their children were:

- Lady Louisa Percy (1802 – 23 December 1883), died unmarried.
- Algernon James Percy, (1803–1805), buried within the Northumberland Vault within Westminster Abbey.
- Margaret Percy, (1805–1810), buried within the Northumberland Vault within Westminster Abbey.
- Henry Algernon Pitt Percy, (1806–1809), buried within the Northumberland Vault within Westminster Abbey.
- Alice Percy (1809–1819)
- Algernon George Percy, 6th Duke of Northumberland (1810 – 1899)
- Lord Josceline William Percy (1811 – 1881), married Margaret Davidson and had issue.
- Lady Margaret Percy (1813 – 16 May 1897), married Edward Littleton, 2nd Baron Hatherton.
- General Lord Henry Hugh Manvers Percy, V.C. (1817–1877), died unmarried.

Louisa, Countess of Beverley, died in June 1848. Northumberland survived her by 19 years and died in August 1867, aged 89. He was buried in the Northumberland Vault, within Westminster Abbey, and was succeeded in the dukedom by his eldest surviving son, Algernon.

Parliament of Great Britain
Preceded by John Mitford; William Mitford	Member of Parliament for Bere Alston; 1799 – 1801; With: William Mitford	Succeeded by Parliament of the United Kingdom
Parliament of the United Kingdom
Preceded by Parliament of Great Britain	Member of Parliament for Bere Alston; 1801 – 1830; With: William Mitford 1801–1806; Josceline Percy 1806–1820; Henry Percy 1820–1825; Percy Ashburnham 1825–1830; Christopher Blackett 1830	Succeeded by Christopher Blackett; David Lyon
Political offices
Preceded by The Marquess of Lothian	Captain of the Yeomen of the Guard; 1842 – 1846	Succeeded by The Viscount Falkland
Peerage of Great Britain
Preceded by Algernon Percy	Duke of Northumberland; 1865 – 1867	Succeeded by Algernon Percy
Preceded by Algernon Percy	Earl of Beverley; 1830 – 1867	Succeeded by Algernon Percy
