= Peter Burrell =

Peter Burrell may refer to:

- Peter Burrell (1692–1756), British MP for Haslemere and Dover
- Peter Burrell (1724–1775), his son, British MP for Launceston and Totnes
- Peter Burrell, 1st Baron Gwydyr (1754–1820), his son, British MP for Haslemere and Boston, and cricketer
- Peter Burrell, 4th Baron Gwydyr (1810–1909), British peer

== See also ==
- Peter Drummond-Burrell, 22nd Baron Willoughby de Eresby
