= Frances Percy, Duchess of Northumberland =

Frances Julia Percy, Duchess of Northumberland (née Burrell; 21 December 1752 – 28 April 1820) was the second wife of Hugh Percy, 2nd Duke of Northumberland, and the mother of the 3rd and 4th Dukes.

Frances was a daughter of the barrister Peter Burrell, of Beckenham, Kent, and his wife, the former Elizabeth Lewis. Her brother was Peter Burrell, 1st Baron Gwydyr, and two of her sisters also married into the aristocracy: Elizabeth, who married the Duke of Hamilton (and later the Marquess of Exeter), and Isabella, who became Countess of Beverley. Isabella's husband, Algernon Percy, was the younger brother of Frances's husband, Hugh Percy.

== Marriage and children ==
She married the future duke, then styled as an earl, in May 1779, shortly after his childless marriage to the former Lady Anne Crichton-Stuart had been dissolved by Act of Parliament. He inherited the dukedom when his father died in 1786, making his wife a duchess.

Their children were:

- Lady Charlotte Percy (3 July 1780 – 3 May 1781)
- Lady Elizabeth Percy (23 December 1781 – 10 January 1820)
- Lady Julia Percy (2 May 1783 – 26 March 1812)
- Hugh Percy, 3rd Duke of Northumberland (1785–1847), who married Lady Charlotte Florentia Clive, but had no children
- Lady Agnes Percy (20 April 1785– 1856), twin sister of the 3rd Duke, who married Maj.-Gen. Frederick Thomas Buller and had no children
- Lord Henry Percy (23 June 1787 – June 1794)
- Lady Emily Frances (or Amelia) Percy (/ January 1789 – 21 June 1844), who married Lt.-Gen. James Murray, 1st Baron Glenlyon, son of the 4th Duke of Atholl and had children (including the 6th Duke of Atholl)
- Lady Frances Percy (13 September 1791– 28 August 1803)
- Algernon Percy, 4th Duke of Northumberland (1792–1865), who married Lady Eleanor Grosvenor, but had no children

== Later life ==
The duke died in 1817, and Frances, now dowager duchess, died in 1820, three months after her oldest surviving daughter Elizabeth died at Syon House, aged 38. Like her daughter Elizabeth and her sister Isabella, Frances was buried in the Northumberland Vault in Westminster Abbey.
