= Stanwick Park =

Country house in North Yorkshire, England

Coordinates: 54.49759°N 1.715872°W

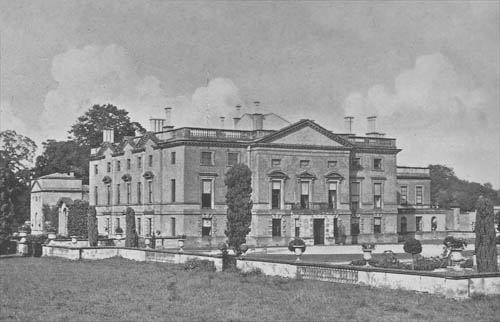
Stanwick Hall around 1900

Stanwick Park (also known as Stanwick Hall) was a Palladian country house at Stanwick St John in North Yorkshire, England.

== History ==
It was re-built by the 1st Duke of Northumberland, a great patron of the arts, c. 1739–1740, mostly to his own designs. The duke's principal seat was Alnwick Castle in Northumberland, thus Stanwick Park was always a secondary residence. The 1st Duke furnished the interior of the house with many works of art, including paintings by Canaletto. As a secondary seat, the house was often allocated to a dowager duchess of Northumberland. During the First World War, the house served as a military hospital. Following the end of the war, it remained empty. In 1918, on the death of 7th Duke of Northumberland, his heirs became liable for large death duties, and as a consequence in 1922 the 8th Duke of Northumberland sold the estate. The house was demolished in 1923.

== Ducal residence ==
For many years, before the First World War, the house had been the residence of Eleanor Percy, Duchess of Northumberland. The duchess lived at the house for 40 years until her death in 1911. She became so attached to the estate that she chose to be buried in the village church, which she had rebuilt by Salvin, rather than in the Northumberland vault in Westminster Abbey. During her occupancy of the house, the gardens were expanded and developed, these included an Italian garden also designed by Salvin. During this period, the gardens were renowned for their glasshouses producing what at the time were considered rare and exotic fruits such as bananas, peaches, grapes, figs and nectarines; some varieties such as the "Stanwick nectarine" were propagated and bred on the estate. The "Stanwick nectarine" was introduced to the United Kingdom by the diplomat John Barker.

== The building ==
The interior of the house contained many fine 18th-century features; before the demolition, some of the decorations and motifs were removed. Three of the rooms were removed completely and are today believed by some to be those in the Minneapolis Institute of Arts. Comparisons with the extant photographs of the house interiors cast doubt upon this, and the links are doubtful; the director of the institute visited Alnwick in the 1930s to check on the provenance, but no record seems to exist of his ultimate findings. A firm called Robersons in London were in this relocation business. It seems possible that since there were 22 rooms from different houses being traded, of which only three were offered from Stanwick, there may have been an error. Museums in Roslyn, New York, and Toronto, as well as the collection of William Randolph Hearst are also alleged to have Stanwick rooms.
