= Thomas Powys (priest) =

Thomas Powys (1747–1809) was an Anglican clergyman of the later 18th century.

He was the son of Philip Powys, of Hardwick House, Oxfordshire. He matriculated at St John's College, Oxford in 1753; B.A. in 1757, and M.A. in 1760. He was rector of Fawley, Buckinghamshire, and of Silchester, Hampshire. In 1769 he was made a prebendary of Hereford, and in 1779 was promoted to the deanery of Bristol. In 1795 he took the degree of B.D. and D.D., and in the following year was appointed canon of Windsor, which he resigned on his appointment as Dean of Canterbury in 1797. He died at Canterbury on 7 October 1809, and was buried in the Lady Chapel of the Cathedral on the same day, according to the Cathedral Register.

Church of England titles
Preceded by Folliott Cornewall	Dean of Canterbury; 1797–1809	Succeeded by Gerard Andrewes
