= St. Thomas' Church, Dera Ismail Khan =

Saint Thomas' Church
- سینٹ تھامس گرجا
- Location: Dera Ismail Khan, Khyber Pakhtunkhwa, Pakistan
- Denomination: Church of Pakistan
- Previous denomination: Church of India, Burma and Ceylon (CIBC)
- Churchmanship: Evangelical

History
- Status: Parish church

Architecture
- Functional status: Active
- Style: Indo-Gothic
- Groundbreaking: 1856

Clergy
- Rector: Akmal Haroon

Saint Thomas' Church (Urdu: سینٹ تھامس گرجا) is a united Protestant parish church in Dera Ismail Khan, Khyber Pakhtunkhwa, Pakistan. Now belonging to the Diocese of Peshawar of the Church of Pakistan, it was built as a Church of India, Burma and Ceylon (CIBC) parish church in 1856. When Saint Thomas' Church was a part of the CIBC, it was a part of the Diocese of Lahore.

The historic Protestant church contains memorial tablets of hundreds of soldiers of the British Indian Army who fought against the Afghans during the 1936-1939 Waziristan campaign.

For over 100 years, the compound of Saint Thomas' Church has housed more than 50 Christian families.

== Tombs ==
- Sir Henry Marion Durand

== See also ==
- Christianity in Pakistan
- Church Missionary Society in India
