= Algernon Percy, 1st Earl of Beverley =

British politician

The Right Honourable The Earl of Beverley FSA
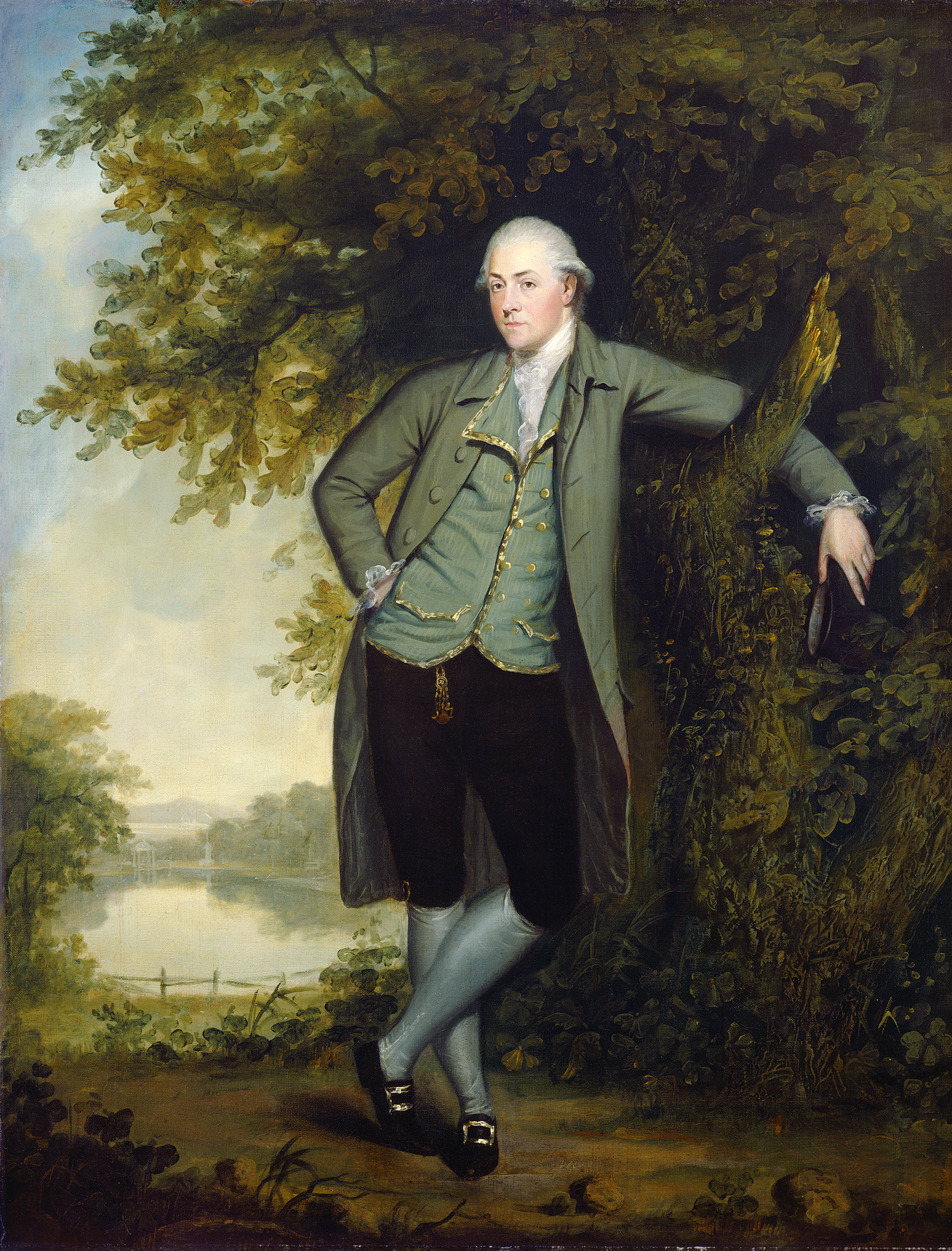

Member of Parliament for Northumberland
- In office 1774–1786

Personal details
- Born: 21 January 1750 Mayfair, London, England
- Died: 21 October 1830 (aged 80) Le Mans, Pays de la Loire, France
- Spouse: Isabella Burrell
- Children: Charlotte Ashburnham, Countess of Ashburnham; Elizabeth Percy; George Percy, 5th Duke of Northumberland; Algernon Percy; Lady Susanna Percy; Hugh Percy; Josceline Percy; Henry Percy; Lady Emily Drummond; William Henry Percy; Francis John Percy; Lord Charles Percy; Lady Louisa Percy
- Parents: Hugh Percy, 1st Duke of Northumberland (father); Lady Elizabeth Seymour (mother)

Algernon Percy, 1st Earl of Beverley, FSA (21 January 1750 – 21 October 1830), styled Lord Algernon Percy between 1766 and 1786 and known as the Lord Lovaine between 1786 and 1790, was a British politician who sat in the House of Commons from 1774 to 1786 when he succeeded to the Peerage. He is the ancestor of the present Dukes of Northumberland.

== Background and education ==
Born Algernon Smithson in Mayfair, London, he was the second son of Hugh Percy, 1st Duke of Northumberland, and his wife, Lady Elizabeth Seymour, only daughter of Algernon Seymour, 7th Duke of Somerset, whose mother was the heiress of the old Earls of Northumberland. He was the brother of prominent military officer Hugh Percy, 2nd Duke of Northumberland. He was educated at Eton College.

== Public life ==
In 1774, Percy was elected Member of Parliament for Northumberland. He was elected MP for both Northumberland and Bere Alston in 1780, and chose to continue sitting for Northumberland. In 1786, he left the Commons when he inherited his father's barony of Lovaine (a title which was created for his father with a special remainder to pass to Algernon as a second son). He was created Earl of Beverley, in the County of York, in 1790.

He died on 21 October 1830, aged 80, at Le Mans, and was buried at St Marylebone Parish Church, Marylebone, London.

== Family ==
Lord Beverley married Isabella Burrell, second daughter of Peter Burrell and sister of Peter Burrell, 1st Baron Gwydyr, in 1775. Their children were:

- Lady Charlotte Percy (1776–1862), married George Ashburnham, 3rd Earl of Ashburnham, and had issue
- Elizabeth Percy (1777–1779), buried within the Northumberland Vault in Westminster Abbey
- George Percy, 5th Duke of Northumberland (1778–1867) had issue Algernon Percy, 6th Duke of Northumberland.
- Hon. Algernon Percy (1779–1833), diplomat
- Lady Elizabeth Susan Percy (1782–1847), a watercolourist who lived in Italy during the 1830s
- Hon. Hugh Percy (1784–1856), Bishop of Rochester and Carlisle
- Vice-Admiral Hon. Josceline Percy (1784–1856), naval commander
- Lieutenant-Colonel Hon. Henry Percy (1785–1825), army officer
- Lady Emily Charlotte Percy (1786–1877), married Andrew Drummond, and had issue
- Hon. William Henry Percy (1788–1855), politician and naval commander
- Hon. Francis John Percy (1790–1812), army officer
- Hon. Charles Greatheed Bertie Percy (1794–1870)
- Lady Louisa Margaret Percy (1796–1796), buried within the Northumberland Vault in Westminster Abbey

Lord Beverley died in October 1830, aged 80, and was succeeded by his eldest son, George, who later inherited the dukedom of Northumberland from his cousin, the 4th Duke, in 1865.

== Sources ==
- Burke's Peerage & Gentry

Parliament of Great Britain
Preceded by George Delaval; Sir Edward Blackett, Bt	Member of Parliament for Northumberland; 1774 – 1786; With: Sir William Middleton, Bt	Succeeded by Sir William Middleton, Bt; Charles Grey
Preceded by Sir Francis Drake, Bt; Hon. George Hobart	Member of Parliament for Bere Alston; September 1780 – December 1780; With: The Lord Macartney	Succeeded by Viscount Feilding; The Lord Macartney
Peerage of Great Britain
New creation	Earl of Beverley; 1790 – 1830	Succeeded by George Percy
Preceded by Hugh Percy	Baron Lovaine; 1786 – 1830	Succeeded by George Percy
