= Charlotte Ashburnham, Countess of Ashburnham =

English aristocrat (1776–1862)

Charlotte Ashburnham
- Countess of Ashburnham
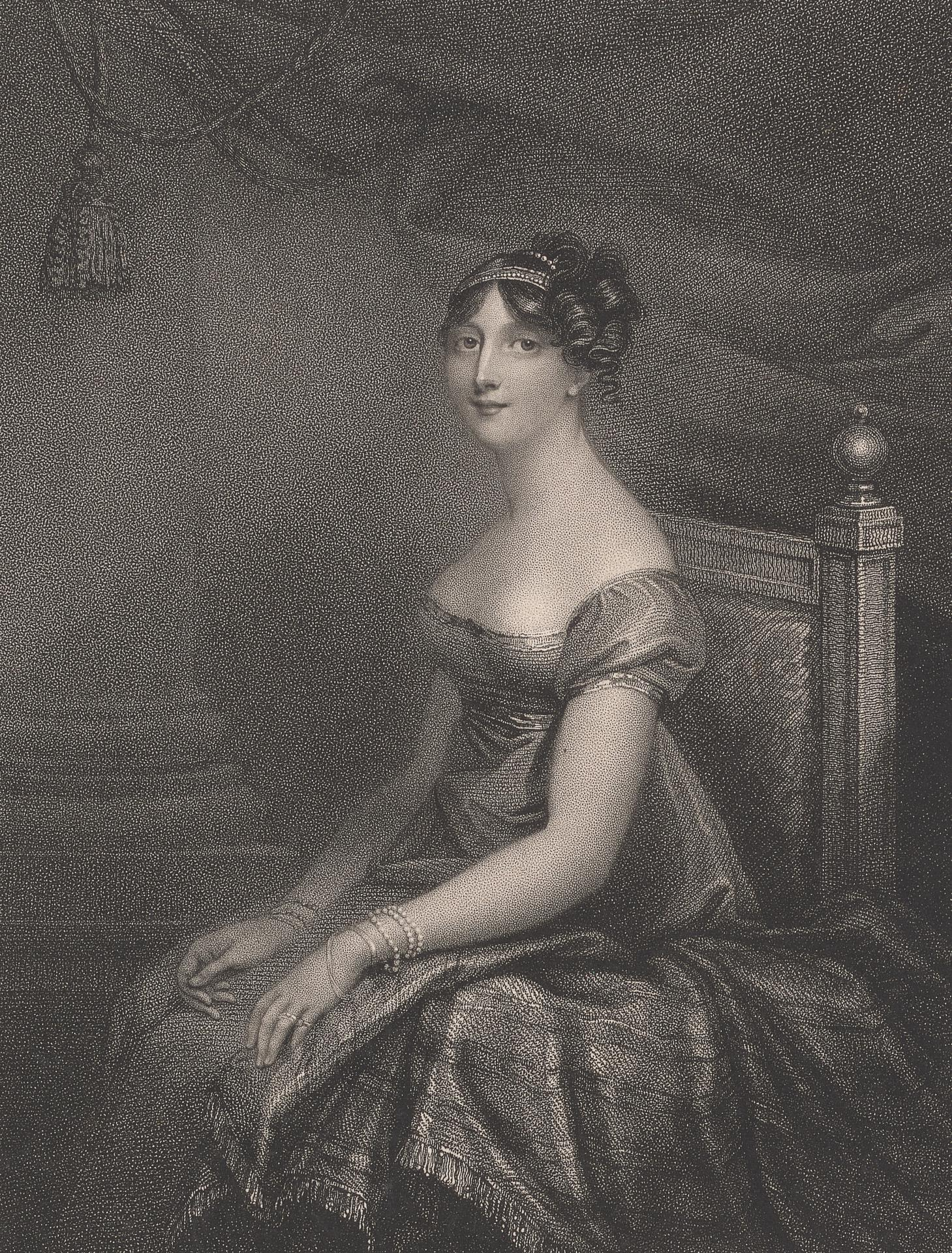
- Born: 3 June 1776; Marylebone, London, England
- Died: 26 November 1862 (aged 86); Belgravia, London, England
- Noble family: House of Percy
- Spouse: George Ashburnham, 3rd Earl of Ashburnham
- Issue: 13, including Bertram and Thomas
- Father: Algernon Percy, 1st Earl of Beverley
- Mother: Isabella Burrell

Charlotte Ashburnham, Countess of Ashburnham (née Percy; 3 June 1776 – 26 November 1862), was an English aristocrat. She was the second wife of George Ashburnham, 3rd Earl of Ashburnham, and the mother of the fourth earl.

Lady Charlotte was the eldest daughter of Algernon Percy, 1st Earl of Beverley, son of Hugh Percy, 1st Duke of Northumberland, and Beverley's wife, Isabella Burrell. Her brother was George Percy, 5th Duke of Northumberland.

Ashburnham's first marriage, to the Hon. Sophia Thynne, ended with her death in 1791. Of their four children, both sons and one daughter predeceased their father, leaving only Lady Elizabeth Sophia Ashburnham, who died unmarried on 13 March 1879, aged 92. As a result, it was the eldest surviving son of his second marriage who would inherit the earldom.

Lady Charlotte Percy married George Ashburnham, Viscount St Asaph (future Earl of Ashburnham) at Orwell Park, Ipswich, on 25 July 1795. They had 13 children:

- The Hon. William Ashburnham (1797), who died in infancy
- Bertram Ashburnham, 4th Earl of Ashburnham (1797–1878), who married Lady Katherine Charlotte Baillie and had children
- The Hon. Percy Ashburnham (1799–1881), who married Esther By and had children
- Lady Charlotte Susan Ashburnham (1801–1865), who died unmarried
- Lady Theodosia Julia Ashburnham (1802–1887), who died unmarried
- The Hon. Charles Ashburnham (1803–1848), who married Sarah Joanna Murray and had no children
- Lady Georgiana Jemima Ashburnham (1805–1882), who married twice: first, to Henry Reveley Mitford (marriage dissolved), and second, to Hon. Francis George Molyneux. There were children from both marriages, including Bertram Freeman-Mitford, 1st Baron Redesdale, grandfather of the Mitford sisters
- Lady Jane Henrietta Ashburnham (1809–1896), who married Admiral Charles Henry Swinburne, and was mother of the poet Algernon Charles Swinburne)
- Lady Katherine Frances Ashburnham (1812–1839), who married Henry William Beauclerk and had one child
- Lady Eleanor Isabel Bridget Ashburnham (1814–1895), who married Reverend Algernon Wodehouse and had children
- General The Hon. Thomas Ashburnham, CB (1816–1872), who married Hon. Adelaide Georgiana Frederica Foley and had no children
- Lady Mary Agnes Blanche Ashburnham (1816–1899), who married Sir Henry Percy Gordon, 2nd Baronet, and had one child
- The Hon. Reginald Ashburnham (1819–1830), who died in childhood

George succeeded his father as Earl of Ashburnham in 1812, and, on his own death in 1830, was succeeded by his fourth, but eldest surviving, son, Bertram. Lady Charlotte then became Countess Dowager. She died in 1862 at her home at Eaton Square in London.

Lady Charlotte's portrait was painted by John Hoppner. An engraving is held at Hanbury Hall, Worcestershire. Another, by Charles Wilkin, is held by the Scottish National Portrait Gallery.
