= Gerrard Andrewes =

English churchman

Gerrard Andrewes (3 April 1750 – 2 June 1825) was an English churchman, Dean of Canterbury from 1809.

== Life ==
He was the son of Gerrard Andrewes, vicar of Syston and St. Nicholas, Leicester, and master of the Leicester Grammar School. The younger Gerrard was born at Leicester and educated at Westminster School. He was elected to a Westminster scholarship at Trinity College, Cambridge, took his B.A. degree in 1773, M.A. 1779, and D.D. 1807. From 1771 to 1784 he worked as an usher at Westminster School.

He became occasional preacher at St Bride's Church, and afterwards at St. James's, in the Hampstead Road. In 1788, an old pupil, George Barrington, gave him the living of Zeal Monachorum, in Devon. In 1791 he became preacher at the Magdalen Hospital, and in 1799 at the Foundling Hospital. Lady Talbot admired his sermons, and presented him in 1800 to the living of Mickleham, Surrey, to which he was again presented in 1802 after resigning it upon his collation by Bishop Beilby Porteus to St James's, Piccadilly.

In 1809, he gave up Mickleham on his appointment by Spencer Perceval to the deanery of Canterbury. In 1812, he declined an offer of the bishopric of Chester on the plea of advancing years. He died in 1825 at the rectory of Piccadilly, and was buried at Great Bookham, Surrey. His only publications are sermons.

== Family ==
On 1 December 1788, he married Elizabeth Maria, daughter of the Rev. Thomas Bale, by whom he had three daughters and a son, who married the daughter of William Heberden the Younger.

== Notes ==
Church of England titles
Preceded by Thomas Powys	Dean of Canterbury; 1809–1825	Succeeded by Hugh Percy
