= Hugh Percy (bishop) =

19th-century English Anglican bishop

- Bishop of Carlisle
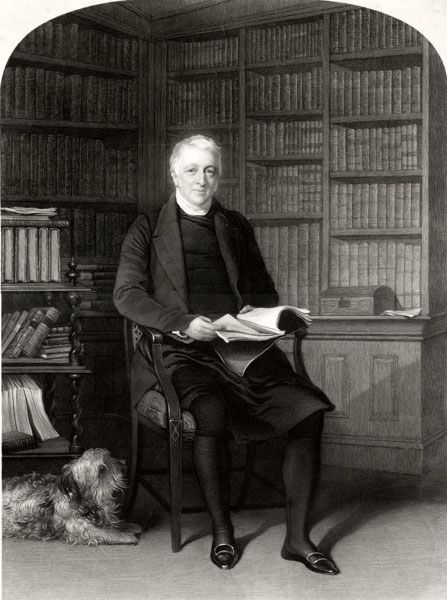
- Hugh Percy
- Church: Church of England
- Diocese: Diocese of Carlisle
- Elected: 1827
- Term ended: 1856 (death)
- Predecessor: Samuel Goodenough
- Successor: Henry Montagu Villiers
- Other posts: Bishop of Rochester; 1827; Dean of Canterbury; 1825–1827

Orders
- Consecration: 15 July 1827

Personal details
- Born: 29 January 1784 London
- Died: 5 February 1856 (aged 72) Cumbria
- Buried: Dalston, Cumbria
- Denomination: Anglican
- Residence: Rose Castle, Cumbria
- Parents: Algernon, Earl of Beverley & Isabella, Countess of Beverley (née Burrell)
- Spouse: Mary Manners-Sutton m. 1806; d. 1831; Mary Johnstone m. 1840
- Children: 11 (8 daughters, 3 sons)
- Education: St John's College, Cambridge

Hon. Hugh Percy (29 January 1784 – 5 February 1856) was an Anglican bishop who served as Bishop of Rochester (1827) and Bishop of Carlisle (1827–56).

== Life ==
Percy was born in London, the third son of Algernon Percy, 1st Earl of Beverley by his wife, Isabella Susannah Burrell, second daughter of Peter Burrell and sister of Peter Burrell, 1st Baron Gwydyr. His mother was the sister of Frances Julia Burrell, who married Hugh Percy, 2nd Duke of Northumberland, and of Elizabeth Hamilton, Duchess of Hamilton.

Percy was educated at Eton College and St John's College, Cambridge, where he graduated Cambridge Master of Arts (MA Cantab) in 1805 and Doctor of Divinity (DD) in 1825; he was admitted DD ad eundem at Oxford University in 1834.

Having taken holy orders, Percy married, on 19 May 1806, Mary, the eldest daughter of Charles Manners-Sutton, Archbishop of Canterbury, by whom in 1809 he was collated to the benefices of Bishopsbourne and Ivychurch, Kent. In 1810 he was appointed chancellor and a prebendary of Exeter, appointments he held until 1816. On 21 December 1812 he was installed as Canon Chancellor of Salisbury Cathedral. In 1816 he was collated by his father-in-law to a prebendal stall at Canterbury Cathedral and in the same year he received the stall of Finsbury at St Paul's Cathedral, which he held until his death. In 1822 he was appointed Archdeacon of Canterbury, and in 1825, on the death of Gerrard Andrewes, he was promoted as Dean of Canterbury Cathedral. While Dean of Canterbury he set in motion the repair of the interior of the cathedral. Two years later (15 July 1827), on the death of Walker King, he was consecrated Bishop of Rochester; after a few months' tenure, he was translated, on the death of Samuel Goodenough, to Carlisle. This bishopric he held till his death.

In 1838 Percy established a clergy aid society, and in 1855 a diocesan education society. He found Rose Castle, the episcopal residence, much dilapidated; he called in the architect Thomas Rickman, and the house was entirely remodelled. The main cost was defrayed out of the episcopal revenues, but he spent his own money on the gardens, grounds, and outbuildings. A rosary was laid out by Sir Joseph Paxton, who also formed the terraced gardens. He was fond of farming, and on his journeys to and from London, to attend the House of Lords, he used to drive his four horses himself. He died at Rose Castle and was buried in the parish churchyard of Dalston.

== Family ==
Percy's first wife, Mary Manners-Sutton, by whom he had three sons and eight daughters, died in September 1831. Among their children were:

- Algernon Charles (29 Jun 1812-24 Jan 1901). served as a Major in the Shropshire Yeomanry and married Emily, daughter of Bishop Reginald Heber; she was heiress to her uncle, Richard Heber MP and, in 1847, he assumed by Royal Licence the additional surname of Heber, becoming Algernon Heber-Percy, after inheriting her family's estates at Hodnet and Airmyn. They had five sons, and seven daughters.
- Henry (1813-6 Sep 1870). Anglican minister (Rector of Greystoke, Cumbria).
- Gertrude (30 Aug 1814-27 Apr 1890), married William Amherst, 2nd Earl Amherst.

He married, secondly, in February 1840, Mary, the daughter of Vice-Admiral Sir William Hope Johnstone.

Church of England titles
Preceded by Gerrard Andrewes	Dean of Canterbury; 1825–1827	Succeeded by Richard Bagot
Preceded by Walker King	Bishop of Rochester; 1827–1827	Succeeded by George Murray
Preceded by Samuel Goodenough	Bishop of Carlisle; 1827–1856	Succeeded by Henry Montagu Villiers
