= Elizabeth Hamilton, Duchess of Hamilton =

British noblewoman (1757–1837)

Her Grace The Duchess of Hamilton
- Portrait by Thomas Lawrence
- Born: 20 April 1757
- Died: 17 January 1837 (aged 79); Whitehall, London, England
- Spouse(s): Douglas Hamilton (m. 1778; div. 1794) Henry Cecil (m. 1800–1804)
- Children: 0
- Parents: Peter Burrell (father); Elizabeth Lewis (mother)
- Relatives: Peter Burrell, 1st Baron Gwydyr (brother); Isabella Burrell (sister); Frances Burrell (sister)

Elizabeth Hamilton, Duchess of Hamilton (20 April 1757 – 17 January 1837) was the wife of Douglas Hamilton, 8th Duke of Hamilton. Their divorce, in 1794, was a cause célèbre; following this, she became the third wife of Henry Cecil, 1st Marquess of Exeter.

Elizabeth was the daughter of Peter Burrell of Beckenham, a barrister. Her brother, Peter, became 1st Baron Gwydyr. Both of her sisters married into the aristocracy, Isabella becoming Countess of Beverley, and Frances becoming Duchess of Northumberland.

The duke had been living abroad when, aged 21, he returned and met Elizabeth Burrell. He reportedly fell in love with her while watching her take the top score in a cricket match organised by the Countess of Derby. They were married in London on 5 April 1778. Hamilton's mother, the former actress Elizabeth Gunning, who was by now the Duchess of Argyll following her second marriage, is said to have disapproved of the match, sniffing that 'the daughter of a private gentleman, however accomplished, was not qualified to be allied to her'. The couple, at first apparently happy, separated in 1793.

In 1794, the couple divorced, by Act of Parliament, after 16 years of marriage which had produced no children. The Duchess brought divorce proceedings on the grounds of her husband's adultery with the actress Harriet Pye Esten, and alleged previous adultery with an unnamed lady (actually Frances Twysden, second wife of the Earl of Eglinton. Lord Eglinton had divorced his wife in 1788 on the grounds of her adultery with the duke, after she had borne a child, possibly Lady Susannah Montgomerie (1788-1805) supposed to be the Duke's. The duchess did not, however, use the Eglinton divorce to support her own case. The 1794 divorce was apparently agreed on beforehand, according to Lawrence Stone in his book Alienated Affections: Divorce and Separation in Scotland 1684-1830. The duke did not defend the case, and the duchess obtained her divorce. However, she did not re-marry until after the death of the duke, in 1799.

In 1800 the duchess married the Earl of Exeter, whose second wife had died in childbirth in 1797. He was created Marquess of Exeter in 1801, but died in 1804, and she did not remarry. Elizabeth, then Dowager Marchioness of Exeter, died at Privy Gardens, Whitehall, London, in January 1837, aged 79.

The title of a country dance named "Hamilton House", involving many changes of partner, was said to have been a reference to the affairs conducted by both the duke and the duchess during their marriage.
