= Durand baronets =

Baronetcy in the Baronetage of the United Kingdom

Escutcheon of the Durand baronets of Ruckley Grange

The Durand baronetcy, of Ruckley Grange in the County of Shropshire, is a title in the Baronetage of the United Kingdom. It was created on 8 April 1892 for Edward Durand, British Resident in Nepal from 1888 to 1891. He was the eldest son of Sir Henry Marion Durand and the elder brother of Sir Mortimer Durand, and he had served on the Afghan Boundary Commission from 1884 to 1886. The 3rd Baronet was a Brigadier in the British Army.

== Durand baronets, of Ruckley Grange (1892) ==
- Sir Edward Law Durand, 1st Baronet (1845–1920)
- Sir Edward Percy Marion Durand, 2nd Baronet (1884–1955)
- Sir Alan Algernon Marion Durand, 3rd Baronet (1893–1971)
- The Rev. Sir (Henry Mortimer) Dickon Marion St George Durand, 4th Baronet (1934–1992)
- Sir Edward Alan Christopher David Percy Durand, 5th Baronet (born 1974)

== Notes ==
Baronetage of the United Kingdom
Preceded by Brodie baronets	Durand baronets of Ruckley Grange; 8 April 1892	Succeeded by Powell baronets
