= Henry Marion Durand =

British Indian Army general (1812–1871)

Major-General Sir Henry Marion Durand KCSI CB
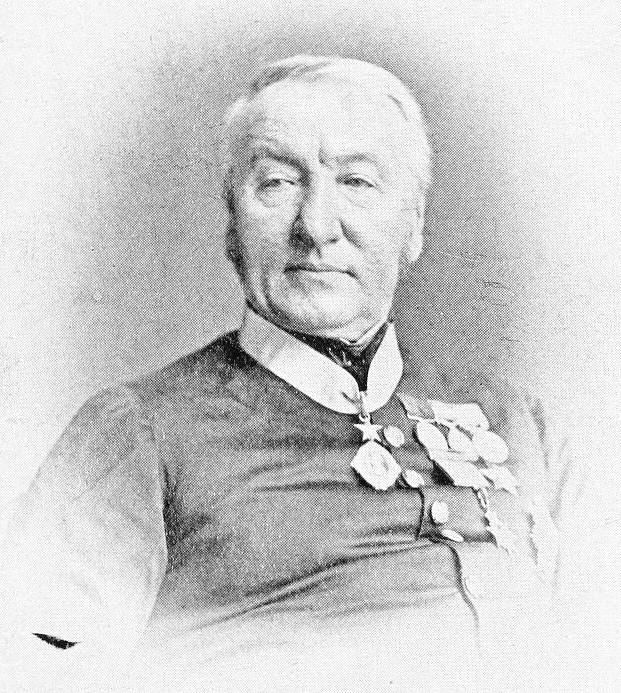

Lieutenant Governor of Punjab
- In office 1 June 1870 – 20 January 1871
- Governor General: The Earl of Mayo
- Preceded by: Sir Donald Friell McLeod
- Succeeded by: Sir Henry Davies

Personal details
- Born: 6 November 1812 Coulandon, First French Empire
- Died: 1 January 1871 (aged 58) Tonk, British India
- Education: East India Company Military Seminary

Military service
- Allegiance: East India Company; United Kingdom
- Branch/service: Bengal Army
- Years of service: 1828-1871
- Rank: Major General
- Battles/wars: First Anglo-Afghan War; Second Anglo-Sikh War; Indian Rebellion

Major-General Sir Henry Marion Durand, KCSI CB (6 November 1812 – 1 January 1871) was a British military officer in the Bengal Army and served as Lieutenant Governor of Punjab from 1870 until his death in 1871.

== Early life ==
Durand was one of two illegitimate sons of Major Henry Percy, a cavalry officer who served in the Peninsular War and later at the Battle of Waterloo, and Marion Durand, a French woman he met while prisoner-of-war in the Napoleonic Wars. Born in Coulandon, France, both his parents died whilst he was young, and he was placed in the care of a family friend Mr. Deans.

He was educated at the East India Company Military Seminary at Addiscombe where he was a contemporary of the future Lord Napier of Magdala who passed out two years before him.

== Career ==
Durand sailed for India in 1829. On-board he developed a friendship with fellow passenger Alexander Duff, however the ship was wrecked on Dassen Island and the friends separated.

On his arrival in India in May 1830, he served initially as Second Lieutenant in the Bengal Engineers. Until 1838 he served chiefly in the north-west provinces, and from 1834 he was Superintendent at Ferozeshah Canal.

In 1838, then Lieutenant Durand gave up his well-paid civil appointment to serve in the engineering department of the expeditionary force to Afghanistan. He served with distinction during the First Anglo-Afghan War however resigned in his post in protest of giving up the entire Bala Hissar to the Afghans, and returned to India.

On his return, Durand was furloughed to England where he became acquainted with Lord Ellenborough. He was offered the post of aide-de-camp to Ellenborough, and on Ellenborough's arrival in India was give the lucrative post of his private secretary.

In June 1843 Durand was promoted to Captain, and the same year married Mary, daughter of Major General Sir John McCaskill. In December 1843 he assisted Ellenborough during the Gwalior campaign, and at its conclusion was awarded the bronze star for Maharajpore. When Ellenborough was dismissed by the East India Company in 1844 Durand lost his role as private secretary, and was later appointed Commissioner of Tenasserim until he was removed from the post in 1846. Durand then sailed to London to protest his removal to the directors of the East India Company, and returned to India with an order that he be reinstated to an equivalent post. The order was however ignored by The Earl of Dalhousie and Durand returned to military service.

During the Second Anglo-Sikh War Durand saw action at the Battle of Chillianwala and Battle of Gujrat. He was attached to the 3rd Division under Brigadier General Colin Campbell who later noted the Durand rendered him "valuable assistance" and that his "warmest acknowledgements" are due to him.

For his war service he promoted to Brevit-Major and appointed Political Agent, a civil role, at Gwalior. From Gwalior he was transferred to Bhopal and in 1853 made Resident of Nagpur. During these years he became a regular contributor to the Calcutta Review on the history and society of India. In 1853 Durand went to England and after three years leave, returned to India in 1856 as a lieutenant colonel.

== Indian mutiny of 1857 ==
On his return he was appointed acting Political Agent at Indore, assuming the role in April 1857, the same month as the start of the Indian Rebellion of 1857. On 1 June a mob headed by an officer in Tukojirao Holkar II's army, entered the Residency at Indore, crying out "Kill the Sahibs". Colonel Travers led a charge against the mob for which he was later awarded the Victoria Cross. Thereafter Durand organised an evacuation of the Residency first to Sehore, then Hoshangabad, and finally Bombay.

Having re-grouped Durand accompanied a column led by Sir Charles Stuart for the relief of Mhow Fort. The action was successful, order restored and the Residency at Indore re-built. However, in October rebels assembled a force at Dhar. Durand was involved in operations against the rebels at Mundisore. On 24 November, Durand was summoned to Calcutta and in recognition of his services during the mutiny was raised to the rank of Brevit Colonel.

== Council of India ==
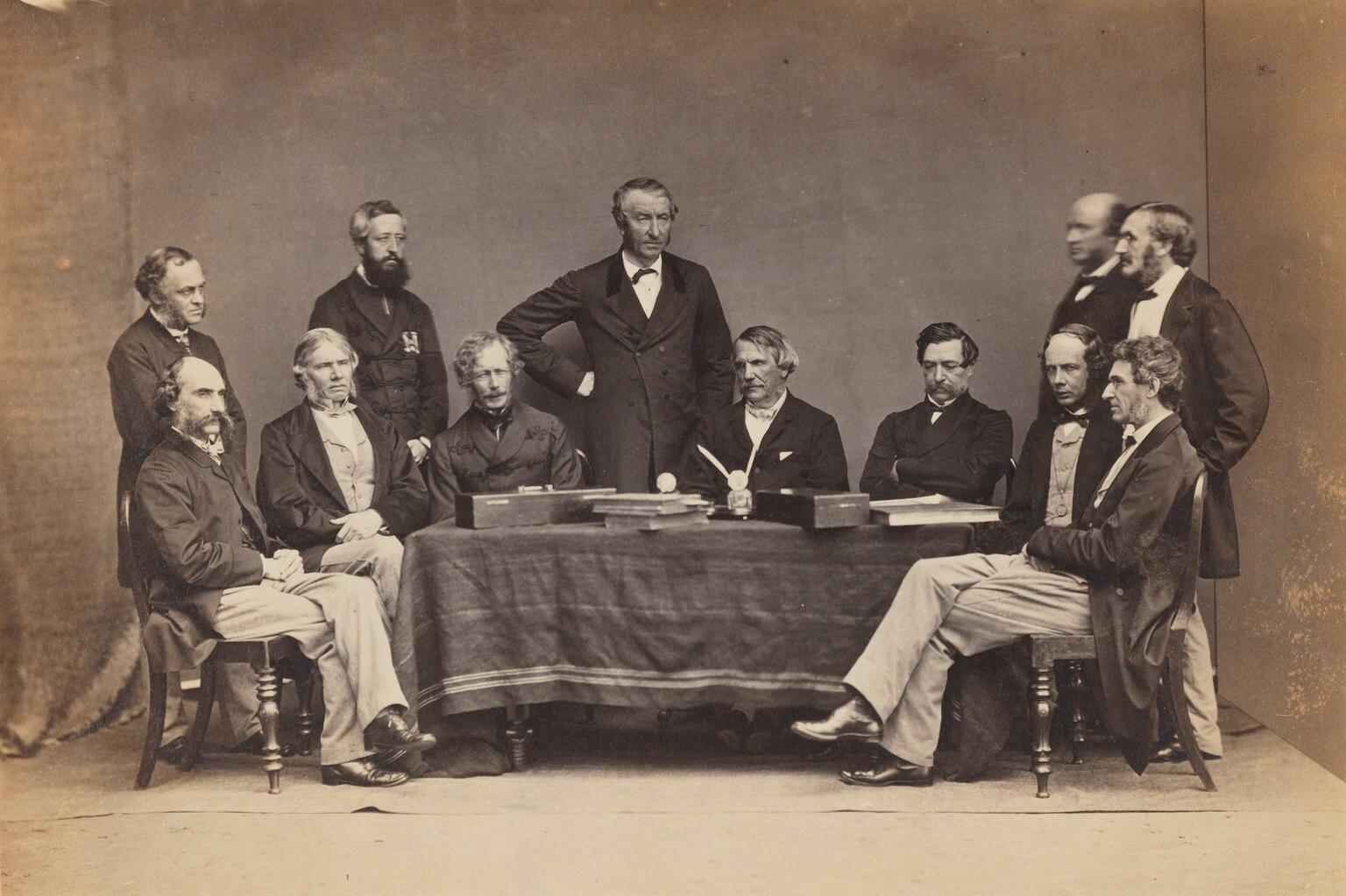
Henry Marion Durand, standing third from left, with John Lawrence, Viceroy of India and other council members. c. 1864

In 1858, under the terms of the Queen's Proclamation issued by Queen Victoria, the Indian possessions of the East India Company came under the direct rule of the British crown. Durand was sent to England to assist in plans to re-organise the Company armies. Whilst in England he was appointed to Council of the Secretary of State for India, remaining in the role for the next three years until he resigned in 1861.

Lord Canning appointed Durand Foreign Secretary of his administration, and he returned to India. In 1865 he was given to the post of Military Member of the Governor General's Council. The following year he was promoted Major General and made Knight Commander of the Star of India.

The Hindoo Patriot later remarked of his time with the council, "He touched upon questions of all descriptions which came before the Council with all the skill and masterliness of an expert...all his utterances were marked by an intelligent appreciation of the want and wishes of the people, by broad sympathies, and by fearless independence." He was a vocal opponent of the Punjaub Tenancy Act, pronounced the North West Municipal Act as an unmitigated sham practically used for the convenience of a few European residents rather than for the good of the mass of the population, and raised opposition to the Income Tax policy which he described as "odious". Such was the esteem he was held in by locals, the article remarked that he and William Mansfield constituted "the only independent element in the Council and when they left the right hand of the government was lopped off."

== Punjab and death ==
In May 1870, The Earl of Mayo appointed Durant to succeed Sir Donald McLeod as Lieutenant Governor of the Punjab. At his farewell banquet in Simla that month, Durant remarked of his respect and love for the soldiers he fought during the Second Anglo-Sikh War, and his intention to do all he can for the welfare of the people of the province.

On the evening of 31 December 1870, Durand was thrown from an elephant as it attempted to pass under a low gateway in the city of Tonk (now Tank, Pakistan). He fell heavily and died the following day. He was also accompanied by the Nawab of Tank on the same elephant. Durand had been Lieutenant Governor for only six months there. He was buried in Saint Thomas' Church in Dera Ismail Khan, NWFP, British India.

The inscription of his tomb reads:

Sacred to the memory of Henry Marion Durand Major General Royal Engineers C.B. K.C.S.I. Lieutenant Governor of Punjab. born Novr 15th 1812 – died Jany 1st 1871. He entered the army in 1828 and after serving his country for forty years in the field and in the cabinet, was killed in the discharge of his duty, by a fall from an elephant at Tank – N.W. Frontier.

== Personal life ==
Durand had three sons: Edward, 1st Baronet Durand; Mortimer Durand; and Algernon Durand. Mortimer served in the Indian Civil Service and later in the British diplomatic service. For a time he lived at Furness Lodge, East Sheen, Richmond.

One of Durand's daughters, Frances Mary Durand, married Major General Charles MacGregor. Another daughter, Ethel Durand, married the naturalist and African explorer James Sligo Jameson.

== Bibliography ==
This article incorporates text from a publication now in the public domain: Stephen, Leslie, ed. (1888). "Durand, Henry Marion". Dictionary of National Biography. Vol. 16. London: Smith, Elder & Co.

- Campbell, George (1879). The Afghan Frontier.
- Durand, Henry Marion (1879). The First Afghan War and its Causes. London: Longmans, Green & Co.
- Durand, Henry Mortimer (1883). The Life of Major-General Sir Henry Marion Durand, KCSI, CB, of the Royal Engineers. London: W. H. Allen.
- Fraser-Tytler, W. K. (1950). Afghanistan: A Study of Political Developments in Central Asia.
- Stearn, Roger T. (2008) [2004]. "Durand, Sir Henry Marion (1812–1871)". Oxford Dictionary of National Biography (online ed.). Oxford University Press. doi:10.1093/ref:odnb/8307. (Subscription, Wikipedia Library access or UK public library membership required.)
- Vibart, H. M. (1894). Addiscombe: Its Heroes and Men of Note. Westminster: Archibald Constable. pp. 431–438. OL 23336661M.
