= Henry Percy (British Army officer) =

British army officer and politician

The Honourable Henry Percy CB
- Born: 14 September 1785
- Died: 15 April 1825 (aged 39)
- Children: 2, including Henry
- Military career
- Allegiance: United Kingdom
- Branch: British Army
- Service years: 1804–1825
- Rank: Lieutenant-colonel
- Conflicts: Napoleonic Wars; Peninsular War; Battle of Corunna; Second Battle of Porto; Battle of Talavera; Hundred Days; Battle of Quatre Bras; Battle of Waterloo

Lieutenant-Colonel Henry Percy CB (14 September 1785 – 15 April 1825) was a British Army officer. Having served as Aide-de-camp of Duke of Wellington at the Battle of Waterloo, he brought the news of the victory to London.

== Military career ==
He was the fifth son of the 1st Earl of Beverley and Isabella Susanna, and a grandson of the 1st Duke of Northumberland. Educated at Eton, Percy purchased a Lieutenant's commission in the 7th Regiment of Foot in 1804. He took part in the Peninsular War as aide-de-camp (ADC) to Lieutenant General Sir John Moore from 1808 to 1809. He transferred to the 14th Dragoons as a captain and was brevetted major in 1810. He was captured in 1812 during the retreat from Burgos, and spent two years as a prisoner in France. Following Napoleon's exile to Elba in 1815, he was released.

When Napoleon returned in 1815, Major Percy served as ADC to the Duke of Wellington and was present at the battles of Quatre Bras and Waterloo. Having been the only one of Wellington's ADCs to survive Waterloo unscathed, he was assigned the task of carrying to London the dispatch announcing victory and the two French Imperial Eagles captured in the battle. Leaving immediately after the battle, he crossed the Channel on board the sloop HMS Peruvian, having rowed some of the way. Arriving at Downing Street on 21 June at 10 pm he informed foreign secretary Earl Bathurst of the victory; then he delivered the dispatch and captured eagles to the Prince Regent at St James's Square. He was promoted to brevet lieutenant colonel as a reward for his service. He retired in 1821 and died in 1825.

== Family ==
Although he never married, he had two illegitimate sons with a French woman while he was a prisoner of war in France. His sons were Major General Sir Henry Durand and Percy Durand. Sir Henry Durand's elder son Edward Durand was created Baronet in 1892, while his younger son Sir Mortimer Durand was an important diplomat.
