= Mortimer Durand =

British diplomat (1850–1924)

The Right Honourable Sir Henry Mortimer Durand GCMG KCSI KCIE
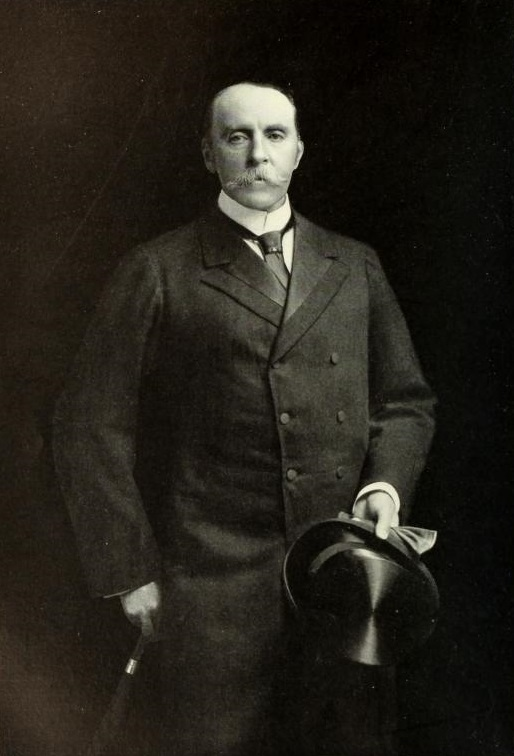
- Portrait, c. 1904
- Born: 14 February 1850; Sehore, Bhopal State, British India (now Madhya Pradesh, India)
- Died: 8 June 1924 (aged 74); Polden, Somerset, United Kingdom
- Education: Blackheath Proprietary School
- Occupation: Diplomat
- Employer: Indian Civil Service
- Known for: Delimiting the Durand Line to mark the erstwhile Afghanistan–India international border
- Father: Henry Marion Durand

Sir Henry Mortimer Durand, GCMG, KCSI, KCIE, PC (14 February 1850 – 8 June 1924) was a British diplomat and member of the Indian Civil Service. He is best-known as the namesake for the Durand Line, which serves as the international border between Afghanistan and Pakistan.

== Early life and education ==
Born at Sehore, Bhopal, India, he was the son of Sir Henry Marion Durand, the Resident of Baroda and he was educated at Blackheath Proprietary School, and Tonbridge School.

== Career ==
Durand entered the Indian Civil Service in 1873. He served as the Political Secretary in Kabul during the Second Anglo-Afghan War (1878–1880); was Foreign Secretary of India from 1884 to 1894; and appointed Minister plenipotentiary at Tehran in 1894, where despite being a Persian scholar and fluently speaking the language, he made little impression either in Tehran or on his superiors in London. He left Persia in March 1900, by which time owing to the illness of his wife Ella he had withdrawn from social life and the legation was in a depressed and disorganised state. He served as British Ambassador to Spain from 1900 to 1903, and as Ambassador to the United States from 1903 to 1906.

He was appointed a CSI in 1881 knighted with a KCIE in 1888, and a KCSI in 1894 and appointed a GCMG in 1900.

Durand unsuccessfully stood as a Conservative candidate for Plymouth in the January 1910 United Kingdom general election.

General election January 1910: Plymouth
Party	Candidate	Votes	%	±%
Liberal	Charles Mallet	8,091	25.8	−3.2
Liberal	Aneurin Williams	7,961	25.5	−3.9
Conservative	Waldorf Astor	7,650	24.5	+3.2
Conservative	Mortimer Durand	7,556	24.2	+3.9
Majority		311	1.0	−6.7
Turnout			87.9	+2.6
Registered electors		18,085		
Liberal hold		Swing	−3.2	
Liberal hold		Swing	−3.9	

== Legacy ==
=== Afghanistan–Pakistan border ===
The Durand Line is named after Sir Mortimer and remains the international border between Afghanistan and modern-day Pakistan that is officially recognized by all countries apart from Afghanistan. The border is an ongoing point of contention between the two countries, as Afghanistan unilaterally disputes the legitimacy of the border.

In 1884 Durand informed Abdur Rahman Khan, the Amir of Afghanistan, the frontier between modern-day Pakistan (the successor state of British India) and Afghanistan that the garrison of Panjdeh had been slaughtered on the orders of the Russian General Komarov. The Russians wished to stop British occupation of Herat, so Durand was despatched to prevent "the strained relations which then existed between Russia and ourselves," wrote the Viceroy, Lord Dufferin, and "might in itself have proved the occasion of a long miserable war." Tensions at home in British newspapers heightened the urgency of the incident, threatening war in Central Asia, which Rahman was desperate to avoid. A telephone line was kept open between Lord Granville and Count Giers in St Petersburg.

Sir Mortimer was deputed to Kabul by the government of British India for the purpose of settling an exchange of territory required by the demarcation of the Joint Boundary Commission between northeastern Afghanistan and the Russian possessions along the same lines as in 1873, except for the southward salient at Panjdeh. The British made it clear that any further extension towards Herat would amount to a declaration of war. Rahman showed his usual ability in diplomatic argument, his tenacity where his own views or claims were in debate, with a sure underlying insight into the real situation. A Royal Commission was established to demarcate the boundary between Afghanistan and the British-governed India. The two parties camped at Parachinar, now part of FATA Pakistan, near Khost Afghanistan. From the British side the camp was attended by Mortimer Durand and Sahibzada Abdul Qayyum, the Political Agent for Khyber. The Afghans were represented by Sahibzada Abdul Latif and Governor Sardar Shireendil Khan representing Amir Abdur Rahman Khan. The territorial exchanges were amicably agreed upon; the relations between the British Indian and Afghan governments, as previously arranged, were confirmed. The Durand Road in Lahore is also named after him.

=== Durand Cup ===
In 1888, Durand founded a football tournament in Shimla to promote the value of sports as a means to maintain health, as well as to encourage sporting competition in India. It would later be named after him.

== Death ==
There is a misconception regarding the grave of Mortimer Durand, leading to the mistaken belief that he is buried in Pakistan. However, in reality, he died in Polden, Somerset, England, and was laid to rest there. The grave that has been associated with him actually belongs to his father, Sir Henry Marion Durand.

== Published works ==
From 1906, after his return to England, he devoted his time to writing.

He also published the biography of his father, General Henry Marion Durand (1812–1871), and also had ambitions as a novelist, often with his wife, Lady E. R. Durand (1852–1913), as a co-author. Some of his publications are:

- Nadir Shah: An Historical Novel (1908)
- The Life of Sir Alfred Comyn Lyall (1913)
- The Life of Field-Marshal Sir George White, V.C. (1915)
- The Thirteenth Hussars in the Great War (1921)
- An Autumn Tour in Western Persia (1902) is by his wife E. R. Durand
