= Eleanor Percy, Duchess of Northumberland =

Eleanor Percy, Duchess of Northumberland (1820–1911), was the wife of Algernon Percy, 4th Duke of Northumberland.

== Biography ==
Eleanor was born on 22 October 1820, the daughter of Richard Grosvenor, 2nd Marquess of Westminster, and Lady Elizabeth Mary Leveson-Gower. She married Lord Prudhoe (later 4th Duke of Northumberland) on 27 August 1842, in what was considered an excellent marriage, as his older brother, Hugh Percy, 3rd Duke of Northumberland, was childless after 26 years of marriage. Lord Prudhoe was born in 1792, making him 28 years her senior and 50 years old at the time of their marriage. He succeeded to the title on 11 February 1847.

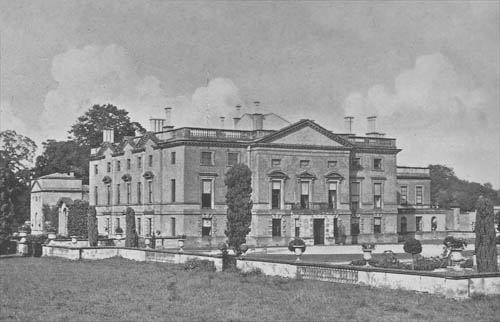
Stanwick Hall, c. 1900.

There were no children from the marriage. The Duchess was widowed on 12 February 1865 and lived until 4 May 1911, dying at the age of 90 at Stanwick Park in Stanwick St John in the Richmondshire district of North Yorkshire.

The Lost Stanwick Hall: remnants of the Duchess Eleanor of Northumberland, her time and people contains many details about her life. This was written as an accompaniment to an exhibition of her life after she was widowed, during which time she was primarily resident at Stanwick Hall, which was demolished in 1923. The entire contents are readable on the Stanwick St John website, as are further articles on her life and her times in this small part of North Yorkshire.
