= Algernon Percy, 4th Duke of Northumberland =

Royal Navy Admiral, explorer and politician (1792–1865)

Admiral His Grace The Duke of Northumberland KG PC FRS FSA FRGS FRAS
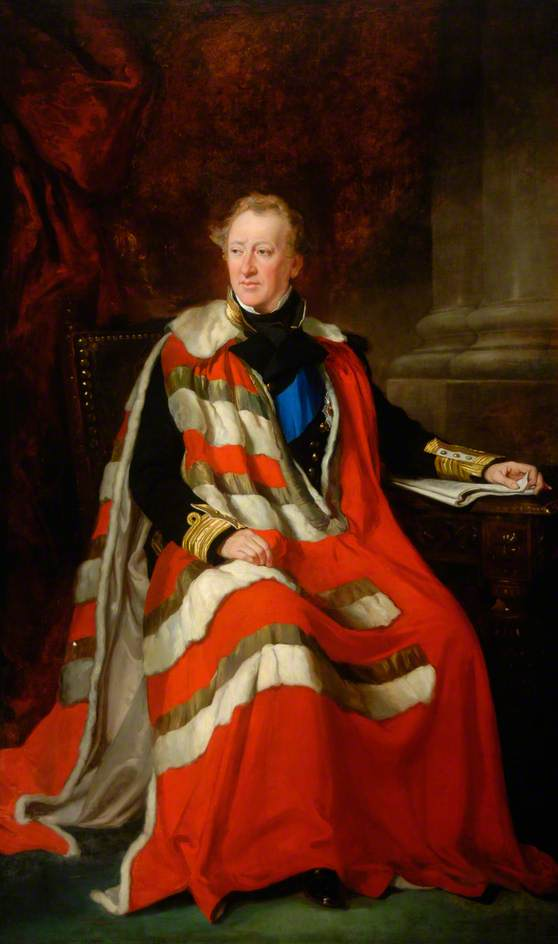
- Duke of Northumberland by Francis Grant

First Lord of the Admiralty
- In office 28 February 1852 – 17 December 1852
- Monarch: Queen Victoria
- Prime Minister: The Earl of Derby
- Preceded by: Sir Francis Baring, Bt
- Succeeded by: Sir James Graham, Bt

Personal details
- Born: 15 December 1792
- Died: 12 February 1865 (aged 72)
- Party: Conservative
- Spouse: Lady Eleanor Grosvenor (m. 1847)
- Parent(s): Hugh Percy, 2nd Duke of Northumberland; Frances Julia Burrell
- Education: St John's College, Cambridge
- Occupation: Member of Parliament

Military service
- Allegiance: United Kingdom
- Branch/service: Royal Navy
- Years of service: 1805–c.1862
- Rank: Admiral
- Commands: HMS Scout; HMS Pelorus; HMS Caledonia; HMS Cossack; HMS Driver
- Battles/wars: Napoleonic Wars; Action of 5 November 1813; War of 1812
- Awards: Knight of the Order of the Garter

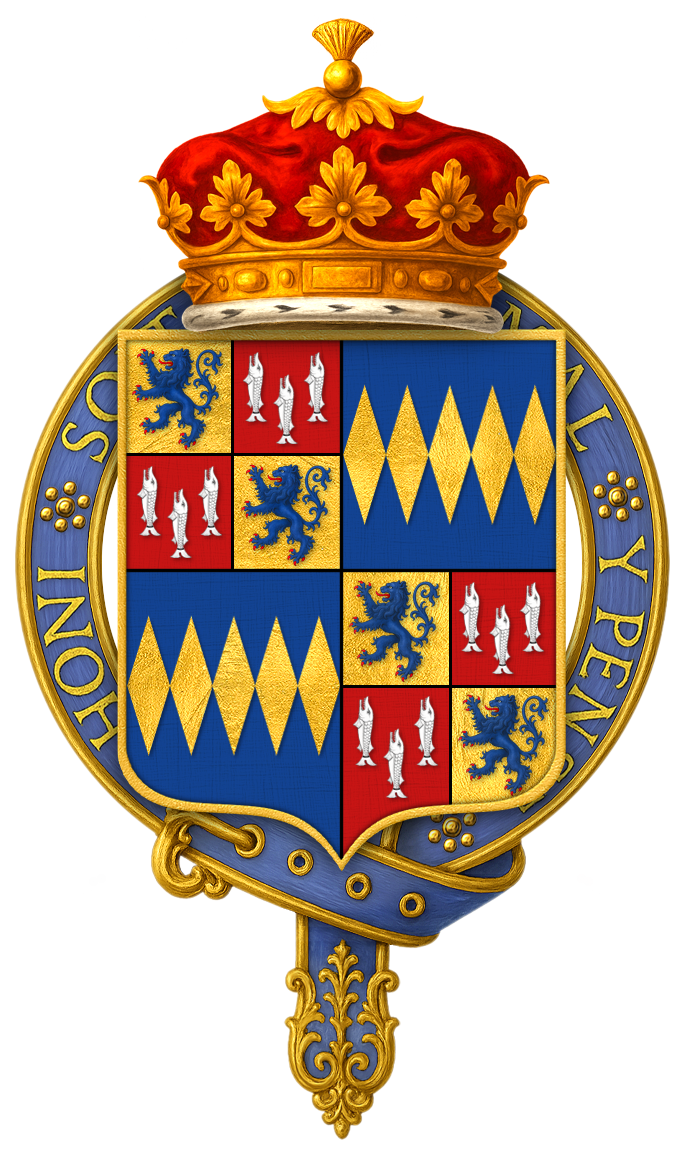
Quartered arms of Algernon Percy, 4th Duke of Northumberland, KG, PC

Algernon Percy, 4th Duke of Northumberland, KG, PC, FRS, FSA, FRGS, FRAS (15 December 1792 – 12 February 1865), styled Lord Algernon Percy from birth until 1816 and known as Lord Prudhoe between 1816 and 1847, was a British naval commander, explorer and Conservative politician.

== Early life ==
Northumberland was the second son of General Hugh Percy, 2nd Duke of Northumberland, and his second wife Frances Julia, daughter of Peter Burrell. He was educated at Eton and St John's College, Cambridge.

== Naval career ==
Northumberland entered the Royal Navy in March 1805, aged 12, on board HMS Tribune and served in the Napoleonic Wars. In 1815, when only 22, he was promoted to captain, taking command of HMS Cossack in August, and commanding her until she was broken up some 10 months later. The following year, aged 23, he was raised to the peerage as Baron Prudhoe, of Prudhoe Castle in the County of Northumberland (Prudhoe being a town in Northumberland). Between 1826 and 1829 he was part of an expedition to Egypt, Nubia and The Levant. During that expedition, Prudhoe obtaining the Prudhoe Lions, a pair of Ancient Egyptian monumental sculptures which he subsequently donated to the British Museum. In 1834, he travelled to the Cape of Good Hope with John Herschel to study the southern constellations.

Northumberland was president of the National Institution for the Preservation of Life from Shipwreck from 1851 to 1865 (partly due to encouragement by George Palmer) during which time he undertook a reorganisation, changing its name to the Royal National Lifeboat Institution in October 1854. In 1851 he offered a prize of £200 for a new design of self-righting lifeboat, won by James Beeching, which became the standard model for the new Royal National Lifeboat Institution fleet.

In 1862 he became a full admiral in the Royal Navy on the Reserved List.

== Political career ==
Northumberland succeeded his childless elder brother in the dukedom in 1847. In 1852 he was sworn of the Privy Council and appointed First Lord of the Admiralty, with a seat in the cabinet, by the Earl of Derby, a post he held until the fall of the government in December 1852. In 1853 he was made a Knight of the Garter.

== Personal life ==
Northumberland married, aged 49, Lady Eleanor Grosvenor, daughter of Richard Grosvenor, 2nd Marquess of Westminster, on 25 August 1842 at St George's, Hanover Square. They had no children. As a result of gout in his right hand, he died in February 1865, aged 72 at Alnwick Castle and was buried in the Northumberland Vault, within Westminster Abbey. He was succeeded in his titles by his twice first cousin, George Percy, 2nd Earl of Beverley, except for the barony of Percy, which passed through the female line to his great-nephew, John Stewart-Murray, 7th Duke of Atholl. The Duchess of Northumberland died on 4 May 1911.

He was a fellow of the Royal Society, the Society of Antiquaries, the Royal Geographical Society, the Royal Astronomical Society, president of the Royal United Services Institute and the Royal Institution, a director of the British Institution and a trustee of the British Museum.

Northumberland was a good friend of Arctic explorer Sir John Franklin, and Prudhoe Bay, on the north coast of Alaska, was named after him.

== See also ==
- O'Byrne, William Richard (1849). "Percy, Algernon" . A Naval Biographical Dictionary . John Murray – via Wikisource.

Political offices
Preceded by Sir Francis Baring, Bt	First Lord of the Admiralty; 1852	Succeeded by Sir James Graham, Bt
Peerage of Great Britain
Preceded by Hugh Percy	Duke of Northumberland; 1847–1865	Succeeded by George Percy
Preceded by Hugh Percy	Baron Percy; 1847–1865	Succeeded by John Stewart-Murray
Professional and academic associations
Preceded by Charles Thorp	President of the Surtees Society; 1863–1865	Succeeded by The Duke of Buccleuch
