= Peter Burrell (1724–1775) =

British politician and barrister

Peter Burrell FRS (27 August 1724 – 6 November 1775) was a British politician and barrister.

== Life ==
Born in London, he was the son of Peter Burrell and his wife Amy Raymond, daughter of Hugh Raymond. His uncle was Sir Merrick Burrell, 1st Baronet and his younger brother Sir William Burrell, 2nd Baronet. Burrell was educated at St John's College, Cambridge, and graduated with a Bachelor of Arts in 1745 and then with a Master of Arts. In 1749, he was called to the bar by Lincoln's Inn.

Burrell sat as Member of Parliament (MP) in the British House of Commons for Launceston from 1759 to 1768 and subsequently for Totnes to 1774.

In 1752, he was invested as a Fellow of the Royal Society, and, in 1769, he was appointed Surveyor General of the Land Revenues of the Crown.

== Family ==
On 28 February 1748, Burrell married Elizabeth Lewis, daughter of John Lewis of Hackney; they lived at Langley Park. They had four daughters and a son, Peter, the later Baron Gwydyr.

- The first daughter Elizabeth Amelia married in 1766 Richard Henry Alexander Bennet.
- The second daughter Isabella (1750–1812) married Algernon Percy, 1st Earl of Beverley, and was ancestor to the Dukes of Northumberland.
- The third daughter Frances Julia Burrell married Hugh Percy, Second Duke of Northumberland in 1779, and was mother to both the Third Duke of Northumberland, also named Hugh, and Algernon Percy, Fourth Duke of Northumberland. Frances's husband and Isabella's husband were brothers, both sons of Hugh Percy, 1st Duke of Northumberland.
- The fourth daughter, Elizabeth, married firstly Douglas Hamilton, 8th Duke of Hamilton and secondly Henry Cecil, 1st Marquess of Exeter. There was no issue from either marriage.

Parliament of Great Britain
Preceded by Sir John St Aubyn; Humphry Morice	Member of Parliament for Launceston; 1759 – 1768; With: Humphry Morice	Succeeded by Humphry Morice; William Amherst
Preceded by Richard Savage Lloyd; Henry Seymour	Member of Parliament for Totnes; 1768 – 1774; With: Sir Philip Jennings-Clerke, Bt	Succeeded by Sir Philip Jennings-Clerke, Bt; James Amyatt
Political offices
Preceded by Hon. Robert Sawyer Herbert	Surveyor General of the Land Revenues of the Crown; 1769–1775	Succeeded by Hon. John St John
