= Hugh Percy, 2nd Duke of Northumberland =

British Army officer and politician

Lieutenant-General His Grace The Duke of Northumberland KG FRS
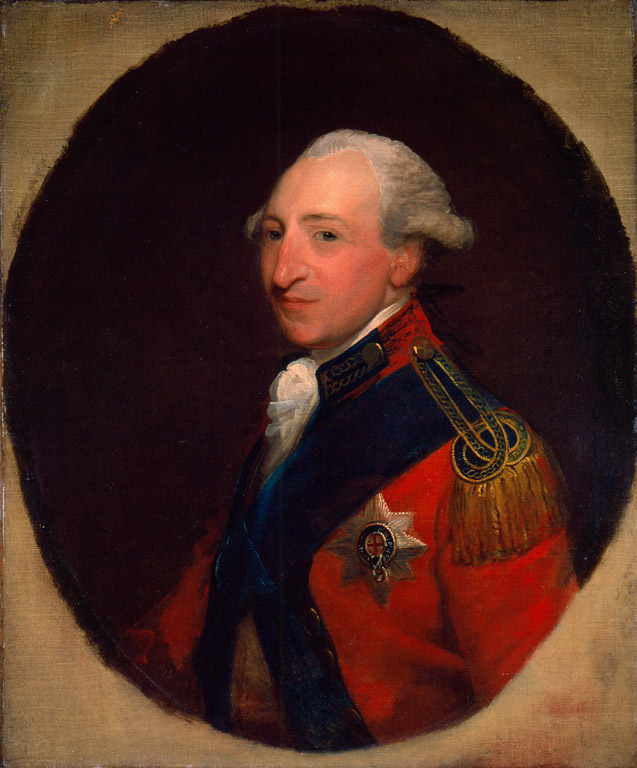
- Portrait by Gilbert Stuart, c. 1788

Personal details
- Born: Hugh Smithson; 14 August 1742
- Died: 10 July 1817 (aged 74)
- Resting place: Northumberland Vault, Westminster Abbey
- Party: Whig
- Spouses: Lady Anne Crichton-Stuart (m. 1764; div. 1779) Frances Julia Burrell (m. 1779)
- Children: 9, including Hugh and Algernon
- Parent(s): Sir Hugh Smithson; Lady Elizabeth Seymour

Military service
- Allegiance: Great Britain; United Kingdom
- Branch/service: British Army
- Years of service: 1759–1777; 1798–1806
- Rank: Lieutenant-general
- Unit: 85th Regiment of Foot
- Commands: Colonel of the 5th Regiment of Foot (1774); Percy Yeomanry Regiment (1798); Colonel of the Royal Horse Guards (1806)
- Battles/wars: Seven Years' War; Battle of Bergen (1759); Battle of Minden; American War of Independence; Battles of Lexington and Concord; Battle of Long Island

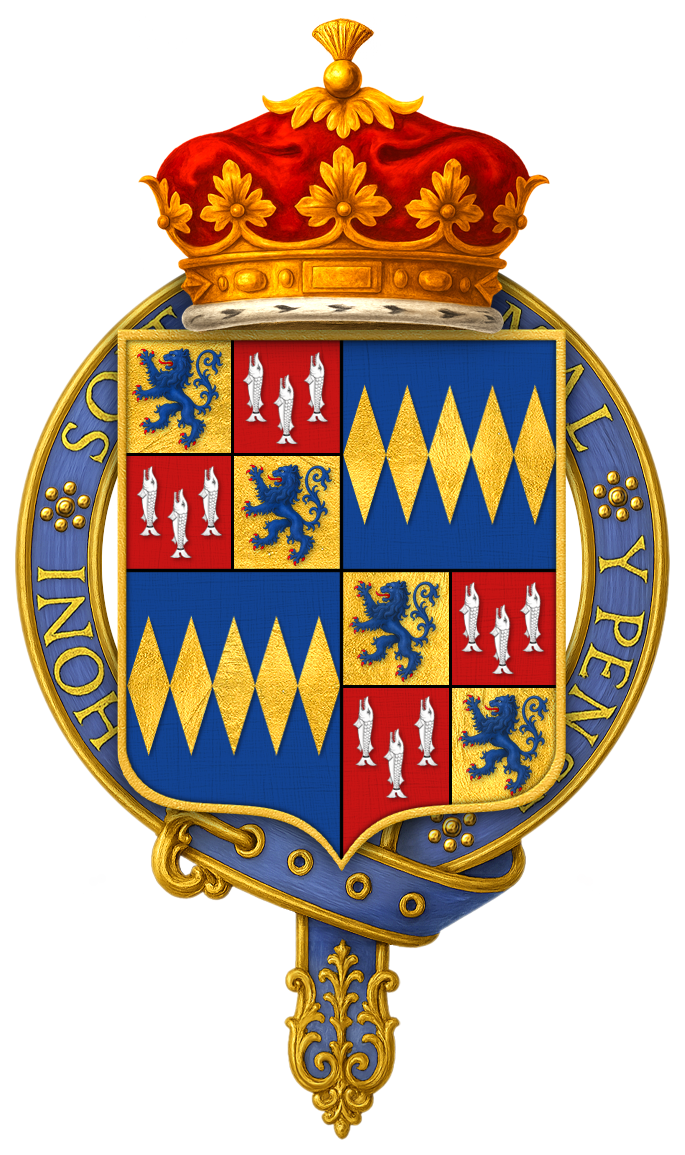
Quartered arms of Hugh Percy, 2nd Duke of Northumberland, KG, FRS

Lieutenant-General Hugh Percy, 2nd Duke of Northumberland, KG, FRS (born Hugh Smithson; 14 August 1742 – 10 July 1817) was a British Army officer and politician. He participated in the Battles of Lexington and Concord and the Battle of Long Island during the American War of Independence, but resigned his command in 1777 due to disagreements with his superior, General William Howe. He assumed the surname of Percy along with his father in 1750 by Hugh Earl of Northumberland's Name and Arms Act 1749 (23 Geo. 2. c. 14 Pr.) and was styled Lord Warkworth from 1750 until 1766. He was styled Earl Percy from 1766, when his father was created Duke of Northumberland. He acceded to the dukedom in 1786.

== Family ==
He was the son of Sir Hugh Smithson and Lady Elizabeth Seymour, heiress of the House of Percy. In 1750, upon the death of his maternal grandfather Algernon Seymour, 7th Duke of Somerset, his father became Earl of Northumberland and changed his name to Percy.

== Early career ==
In 1759, he joined the British Army as a teenager and was a captain of the 85th Regiment of Foot by age 17, an achievement that demonstrated the power of wealth and family standing. He was, nonetheless, a good soldier and fought with distinction in 1759 at the battles of Bergen and Minden. In 1760, he went up to St John's College, Cambridge. Afterwards, he married Lady Anne Crichton-Stuart, daughter of Lord Bute, on 2 July 1764.

In 1766, his father was granted a dukedom and he was styled Earl Percy. As a Member of Parliament and the son-in-law of Lord Bute, Percy was promoted to full colonel and appointed an aide-de-camp to the King in 1764, having barely reached his majority. Percy was in chronically poor health from gout and had poor eyesight. He was physically unattractive, being overly thin and having a large nose. Yet, "He was honorable and brave, candid and decent, impeccably mannered, and immensely generous with his wealth."

== American War of Independence ==
In Parliament, where he was member for Westminster from 1763 to 1776, he had opposed the policy that led to the American War of Independence. However, he was sent to Boston in 1774 with the local rank of brigadier general, colonel of the 5th Regiment of Foot (later called the Northumberland Fusiliers). His views on the military discipline were ahead of their time. "He detested corporal punishments. At a time when other commanders were resorting to floggings and firing squads on Boston Common, he led his regiment by precept and example." Politically a Whig, he at first sympathized with the colonials, but he soon began to despise their behavior. He led the relief column at the Battle of Lexington and Concord. Percy's intelligent actions probably saved the British forces from complete disaster that day.

When his brigade relieved Francis Smith's demoralized troops at Lexington, Percy carefully organized his forces so as to provide all-around protection. He also used his two 6-pounder field guns to break up large formations of American militia. Even so, William Heath, who led the colonials, managed to surround the retreating British column with fire during a grueling forced march. When the British found that the bridge over the Charles River in Cambridge was blocked, Percy turned his column down a side road and led them west to Charlestown. "This sudden change of direction, and the brilliant use of an obscure and unexpected road, took the New England men by surprise. It broke the circle of fire around Percy's brigade." When a final colonial force tried to block British progress at Prospect Hill, "Percy advanced his cannon to the front of his column, and cleared the hill with a few well-placed rounds. It was the last of his ammunition for the artillery. Percy's attitude towards New Englanders turned from contempt to grudging respect. He wrote:

During the whole affair, the rebels attacked us in a very scattered, irregular manner, but with perseverance and resolution, nor did they ever dare to form into a regular body. Indeed they knew too well what was proper, to do so. Whoever looks upon them as an irregular mob, will find himself very much mistaken. They have men amongst them who know very well what they are about, having been employed as rangers against the Indians and Canadians, and this country being very much covered with wood, and hilly, is very advantageous for their method of fighting.

He was absent from the main action during the Battle of Bunker Hill, tasked with firing artillery into Roxbury.

The following year, Percy commanded a division during the Battle of Long Island and led the storming of Fort Washington. By 1777, he had achieved the rank of lieutenant general, but grew so disgusted with the conduct of the war by General Howe that he resigned his command and left America in 1777 in part after a dispute over a quantity of hay. More substantively, while in command of a detached British force garrisoning Rhode Island he fell into disagreement with General Howe over the feasibility of advancing into the hostile New England hinterland.

== Second marriage ==
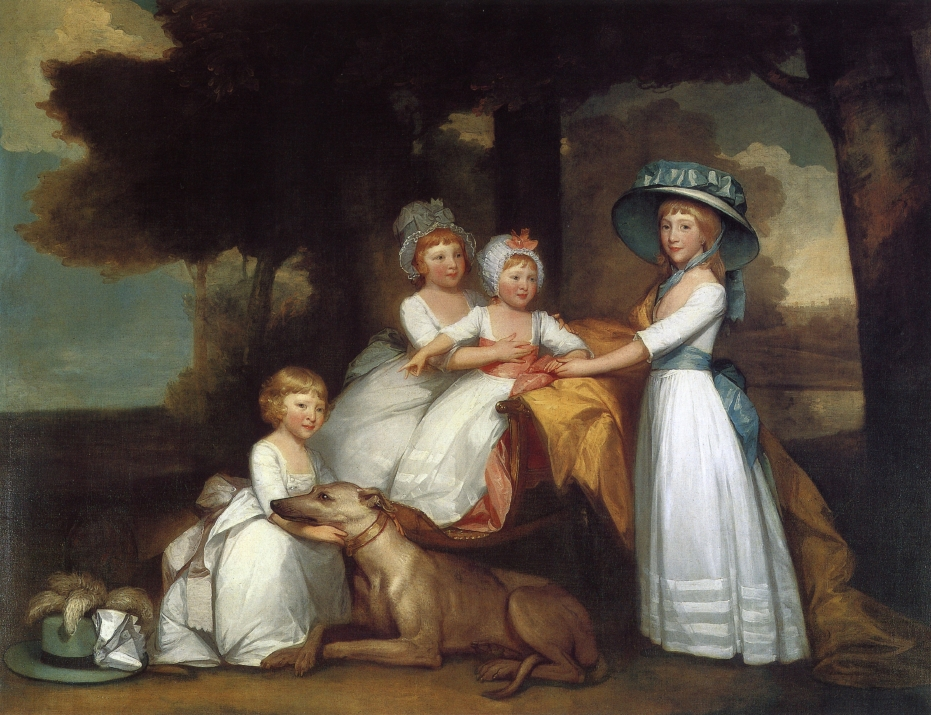
The Children of the Second Duke of Northumberland, oil on canvas, Gilbert Stuart, 1787.

Percy was granted a divorce in Parliament from Lady Anne in 1779 on the grounds of her adultery and immediately married Frances Julia Burrell on 23 May 1779, with whom he had six daughters and three sons, with three daughters and two sons surviving him. Lady Julia Percy Island is named after the second Lady Percy or one of her daughters.

In 1786, he acceded to the title upon his father's death and continued his father's agricultural improvements. For example, when corn prices fell after 1815, he reduced his rents by twenty-five percent. He held twice-weekly gatherings at Alnwick Castle, inviting tenants and local tradespeople. He exercised considerable influence in politics, though he never obtained office. He was created a Knight of the Garter in 1788. He became a general in 1793, and assumed command of the Percy Yeomanry Regiment in 1798 and as colonel of the Royal Horse Guards in 1806.

Notorious for a bad temper as well as for being one of the richest men in England, the second Duke of Northumberland died suddenly of "rheumatic gout" in July 1817. He was buried in the Northumberland Vault, within Westminster Abbey, and was succeeded by his son Hugh Percy, 3rd Duke of Northumberland. Percy's illegitimate half brother was James Smithson, whose bequest founded the Smithsonian Institution.

== See also ==
- Bill Richmond, a man born into slavery in Colonial America whom Percy freed and brought to England in 1777 and who went on to become a celebrated boxer

== Footnotes ==
Parliament of Great Britain
Preceded by Edwin Sandys; Viscount Pulteney	Member of Parliament for Westminster; 1763–1776; With: Edwin Sandys 1763–1770; Sir Robert Bernard 1770–1774; Lord Thomas Pelham-Clinton 1774–1776	Succeeded by Lord Thomas Pelham-Clinton; Viscount Petersham
Military offices
Preceded by Thomas Ogle as Major Commandant	Lt.-Colonel Commandant of the 111th Regiment of Foot; 1761–1763	Regiment disbanded
Preceded by Studholme Hodgson	Colonel of the 5th Regiment of Foot; 1768–1784	Succeeded by Edward Stopford
Preceded by Prince Frederick	Captain and Colonel of the 2nd Troop Horse Grenadier Guards; 1784–1788	Troop disbanded
Preceded by The Duke of Richmond and Lennox	Colonel of the Royal Regiment of Horse Guards; 1806–1813	Succeeded by The Duke of Wellington
Honorary titles
Preceded by The 1st Duke of Northumberland	Lord Lieutenant of Northumberland; 1786–1798	Succeeded by In Commission
Preceded by The 1st Duke of Northumberland	Vice-Admiral of Northumberland; 1786–1817	Vacant Title next held by The 3rd Duke of Northumberland
Preceded by In Commission	Lord Lieutenant of Northumberland; 1802–1817	Succeeded by The 3rd Duke of Northumberland
Peerage of Great Britain
Preceded by Hugh Percy	Duke of Northumberland; 1786–1817	Succeeded by Hugh Percy
Preceded by Elizabeth Percy	Baron Percy; 1776–1812	Succeeded by Hugh Percy
