= Hugh Percy, 1st Duke of Northumberland =

British politician and courtier

His Grace The Duke of Northumberland KG PC
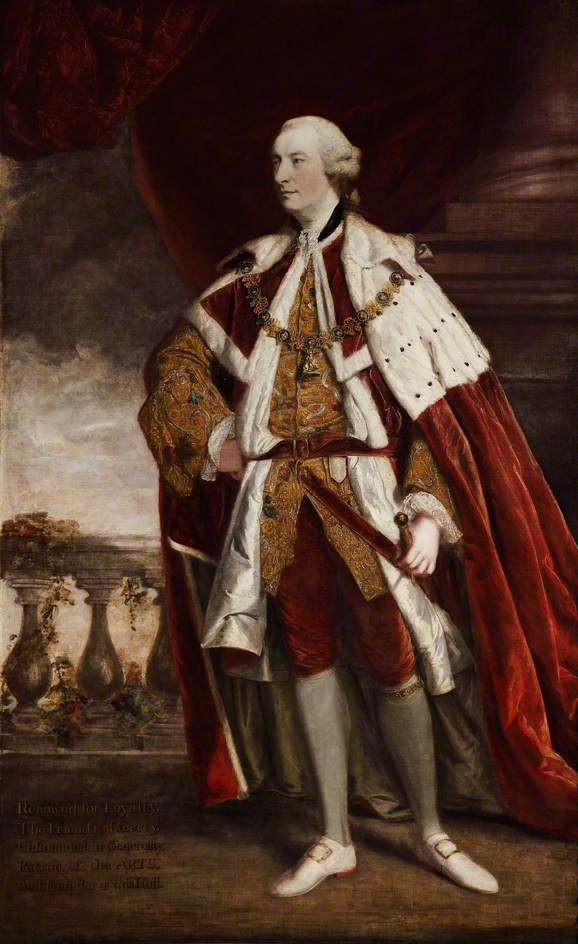
- Portrait by Sir Joshua Reynolds

Personal details
- Born: Hugh Smithson c. 1714 Newby Wiske
- Died: 6 June 1786 (aged 71–72)
- Resting place: Northumberland Vault, Westminster Abbey
- Spouse: Lady Elizabeth Seymour
- Children: by Lady Elizabeth Seymour: Hugh Percy, 2nd Duke of Northumberland; Algernon Percy, 1st Earl of Beverley; Lady Elizabeth Anne Frances Percy by Elizabeth Hungerford Keate: James Smithson
- Parent(s): Langdale Smithson; Philadelphia Reveley

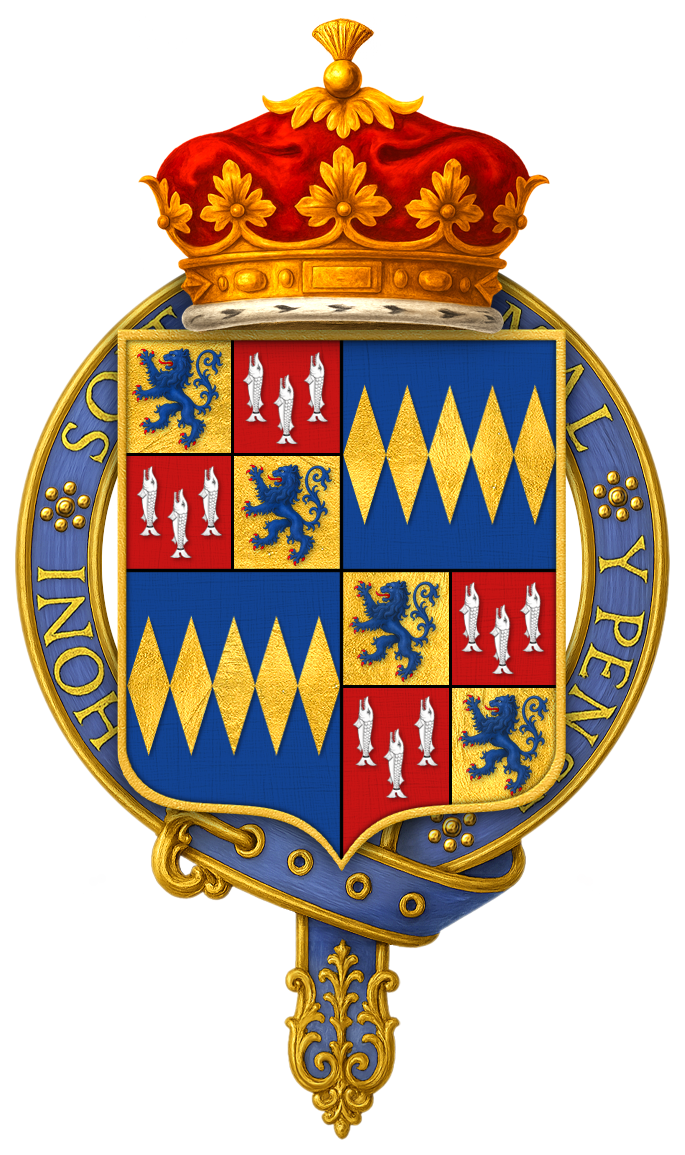
Quartered coat of arms of Hugh Percy, 1st Duke of Northumberland, KG

Hugh Percy, 1st Duke of Northumberland, KG, PC (c. 1714 – 6 June 1786) was a British politician and courtier.

== Origins ==
Hugh Smithson was born c. 1714, the son of Langdale Smithson (b. 1682) of Langdale, and Philadelphia Reveley. He was a grandson of Sir Hugh Smithson, 3rd Baronet, from whom he inherited the Smithson Baronetcy in 1733.

== Marriage, projects and patronages ==
Hugh Earl of Northumberland's Name and Arms Act 1749
- Act of Parliament
- Parliament of Great Britain
- Long title: An Act to enable Hugh Earl of Northumberland and Elizabeth Countess of Northumberland and Baroness Percy his Wife, and their Children, Progeny, and Issue, to take and use the Name of Percy, and bear and quarter the Arms of the Percys Earls of Northumberland.
- Citation: 23 Geo. 2. c. 14 Pr.
- Territorial extent: Great Britain

Dates
- Royal assent: 12 April 1750
- Commencement: 16 November 1749 (Note: Start of session.)

Status: Current legislation

He changed his surname to Percy in 1749, nine years after his marriage with Lady Elizabeth Seymour (1716–1776), daughter of Algernon Seymour, 7th Duke of Somerset, on 16 July 1740, through a private act of Parliament, the Hugh Earl of Northumberland's Name and Arms Act 1749 (23 Geo. 2. c. 14 Pr.).

His wife was Baroness Percy in her own right, and indirect heiress of the Percy family, which was one of the leading landowning families of England and had previously held the Earldom of Northumberland for several centuries. The title Earl of Northumberland passed by special remainder to Hugh Percy, as Elizabeth's husband, when her father died on 7 February 1750; he had been created 1st Earl of Northumberland in 1749. In 1766, the earl was created 1st Duke of Northumberland and was created Baron Lovaine on 28 June 1784, with a special remainder in favour of his younger son, Algernon (in reference to the Louvain family of the Landgraviate of Brabant, which married the Percy heiress, was the origin of the Percy family of England). (Note: Richard de Percy, 5th Baron Percy (c. 1170–1244) (who adopted the surname Percy), was the son of Joscelin of Louvain (1121–1180), styled "brother of the queen" (referring to Adeliza of Louvain, second wife of King Henry I of England, by his wife Agnes de Perci, suo jure Baroness Percy, the heiress of the Percy estates in England.)) He was created a Knight of the Order of the Garter in 1756 and a Privy Counsellor in 1762.

He took a somewhat prominent part in politics as a follower of John Stuart, 3rd Earl of Bute, and was one of George III's confidential advisers. He held the office of Lord Lieutenant of Ireland from 1763 to 1765, and that of Master of the Horse from 1778 to 1780.

Sir Hugh and Francis Grey, 8th Baron Brooke (later created Earl of Warwick) were the most important patrons of Canaletto in England. Smithson made a Grand Tour and was in Venice in 1733, where he acquired two large Canalettos for his seat at Stanwick Park. In 1736 he became one of the two vice presidents of the Society for the Encouragement of Learning. He rebuilt Stanwick Park c. 1739–1740, mostly to his own designs. He was one of the 175 commissioners for the building of Westminster Bridge, of which he had Canaletto paint two large canvases, c. 1747. He built an observatory, designed by Robert Adam, on Ratcheugh Crag, at Longhoughton. Thomas Chippendale dedicated his Gentleman & Cabinet maker's director (1754) to him.

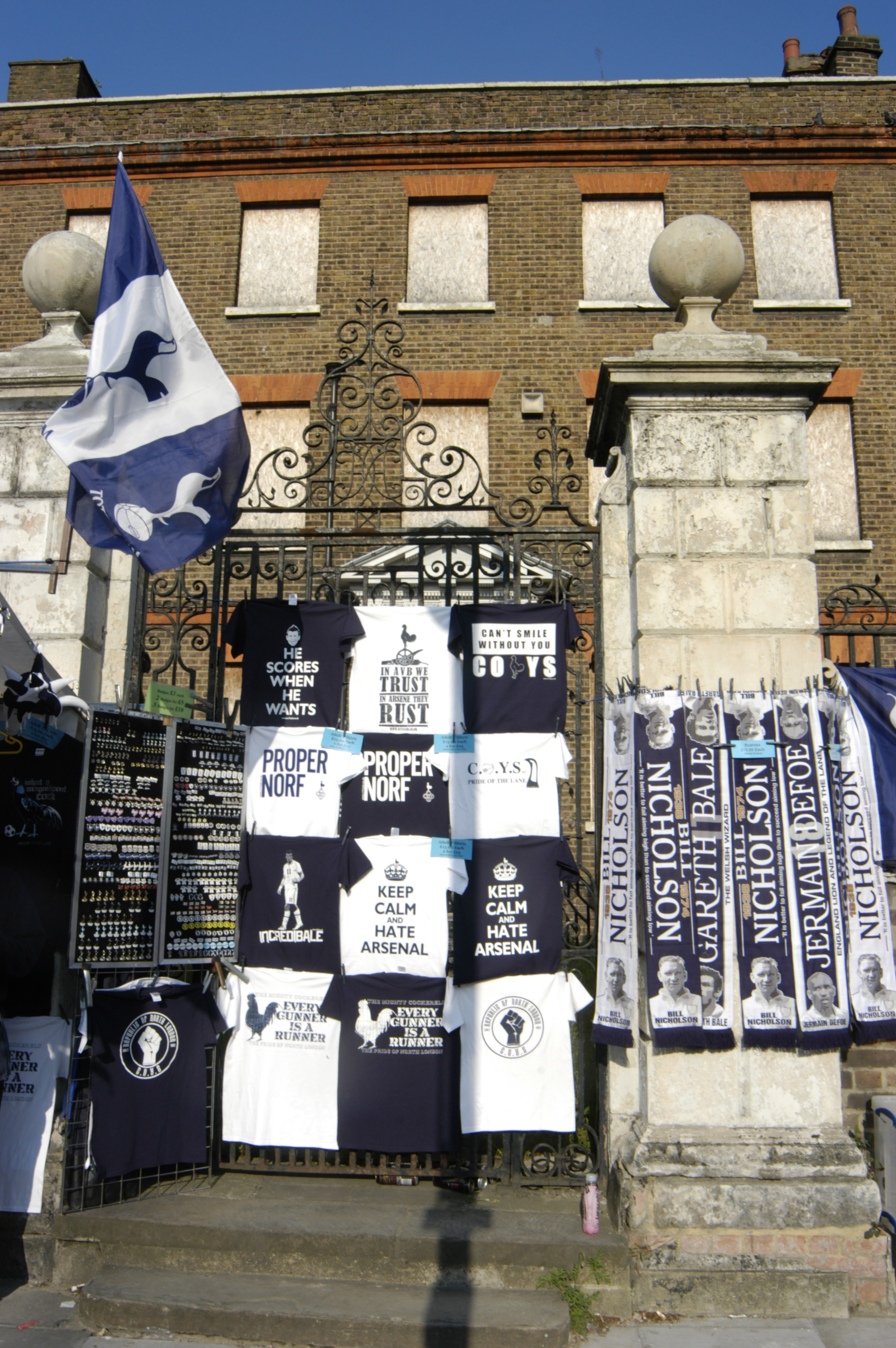
Northumberland Row, site of the ancient Smithson house in Tottenham High Cross.

The Duke and Duchess were prominent patrons of Robert Adam for neoclassical interiors in the Jacobean mansion Northumberland House, the London seat of the Earls of Northumberland; it was demolished c. 1870–1871 to enable the creation of Trafalgar Square. Remnants of the Northumberland House Glass Drawing-Room are preserved at the Victoria and Albert Museum. The greater Adam interiors for the Duke are at Syon House, executed in the 1760s. At Alnwick Castle, Northumberland, the Duke employed James Wyatt, whose work has been effaced by later remodellings. One or other Adam designed Brizlee Tower for the duke.

== Landholdings / seats ==
- Alnwick Castle, Northumberland
- Syon House, Middlesex
- Northumberland House, Strand, London
- Stanwick Park, Stanwick St John, North Yorkshire, the seat of the Smithson baronets.
- Kielder Castle, in the Kielder Forest, Northumberland, a shooting box built in 1775 by the 1st Duke to his own design by William Newton.

== Death and burial ==
Percy died in 1786 and was buried in the Northumberland Vault, within Westminster Abbey.

== Family ==
The Duke and Duchess had three children:

- Hugh Percy, 2nd Duke of Northumberland (1742–1817)
- Algernon Percy, 1st Earl of Beverley (1750–1830)
- Lady Elizabeth Anne Frances Percy (died 1761); buried within the Northumberland Vault in Westminster Abbey.

By Elizabeth Hungerford Keate Macie

- James Smithson FRS (1765–1829), was the Duke's illegitimate son. He was a chemist and mineralogist. He made the founding bequest and provided the name for the Smithsonian Institution in Washington, D.C.

== Notes ==
Parliament of Great Britain
Preceded by Sir Francis Child; William Pulteney	Member of Parliament for Middlesex; 1740–1750; With: William Pulteney 1740–1742; Sir Roger Newdigate, Bt 1742–1747; Sir William Beauchamp-Proctor, Bt 1747–1750	Succeeded by Sir William Beauchamp-Proctor, Bt; George Cooke
Political offices
Preceded by New government	Lord of the Bedchamber; 1760–1762	Succeeded by The Earl of Denbigh
Preceded by The Duke of Manchester	Lord Chamberlain to Queen Charlotte; 1762–1763	Succeeded by The Earl Harcourt
Preceded by The Earl of Halifax	Lord Lieutenant of Ireland; 1763–1765	Succeeded by Viscount Weymouth
Preceded by The Duke of Ancaster and Kesteven	Master of the Horse; 1778–1780	Succeeded by The Duke of Montagu
Honorary titles
Preceded by Mark Kirby	High Sheriff of Yorkshire; 1738	Succeeded by Sir George Cooke
Preceded by The Earl of Tankerville	Lord Lieutenant of Northumberland; 1753–1786	Succeeded by The 2nd Duke of Northumberland
Preceded by The Earl of Tankerville	Custos Rotulorum of Northumberland; 1753–1786	Succeeded by The 2nd Duke of Northumberland
Vacant Title last held by Sir John Delaval	Vice-Admiral of Northumberland; 1755–1786	Succeeded by The 2nd Duke of Northumberland
Preceded by The Duke of Newcastle-upon-Tyne	Custos Rotulorum of Middlesex; 1762–1786	Vacant Title next held by Henry Dundas
Preceded by The Duke of Newcastle-upon-Tyne	Lord Lieutenant of Middlesex; 1763–1786	In Commission
Peerage of Great Britain
New creation	Duke of Northumberland; 1766–1786	Succeeded by Hugh Percy
Preceded by Algernon Seymour	Earl of Northumberland; 1750–1786	Succeeded by Hugh Percy
New creation	Baron Lovaine; 1784–1786	Succeeded by Algernon Percy
Baronetage of England
Preceded by Hugh Smithson	Baronet (of Stanwick); 1733–1786	Succeeded by Hugh Percy
