= Burials and memorials in Westminster Abbey =

Individuals interred at Westminster Abbey, London

Honouring individuals buried in Westminster Abbey has a long tradition. Over 3,300 people are buried or commemorated in the abbey. This Anglican church is generally a royal mausoleum. It features both coffins and urns. For much of the abbey's history, most of the people buried there besides monarchs were people with a connection to the church – either ordinary locals or the monks of the abbey itself, who were generally buried without surviving markers. Since the 18th century, it has become a prestigious honour for any British person to be buried or commemorated in the abbey, a practice much boosted by the lavish funeral and monument of Sir Isaac Newton, who died in 1727. By the end of the 19th century, so many prominent figures were buried in the abbey that the writer William Morris called it a "National Valhalla".

== History ==
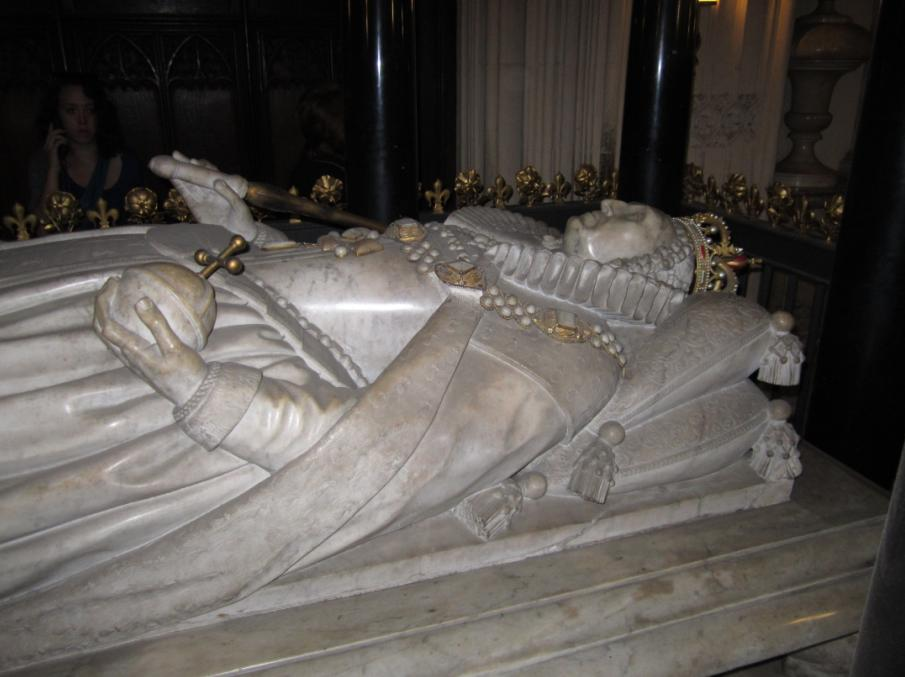
Tomb effigy of Queen Elizabeth I

Henry III rebuilt Westminster Abbey in honour of the Royal Saint Edward the Confessor, whose relics were placed in a shrine in the sanctuary and now lie in a burial vault beneath the 1268 Cosmati mosaic pavement, in front of the high altar. Henry III was interred nearby in a chest tomb with effigial monument. Many of the Plantagenet kings of England, their wives and other relatives, were also buried in the abbey. From the time of Edward the Confessor, until the death of George II in 1760, most kings and queens of England were buried here, although there are exceptions (most notably Edward IV, Henry VIII and Charles I, who are buried in St George's Chapel, Windsor Castle). All monarchs who died after George II were buried in Windsor; most were laid to rest in St George's Chapel, although Queen Victoria and Edward VIII are buried at Frogmore, where the royal family has a private cemetery.

Since the Middle Ages, aristocrats were buried inside chapels, while monks and other people associated with the abbey were buried in the cloisters and other areas. One of these was Geoffrey Chaucer, who was employed as master of the King's Works and had apartments in the abbey. Other poets, writers and musicians were buried or memorialised around Chaucer in what became known as the Poets' Corner. These include: W. H. Auden, William Blake, Lord Byron, Henry Francis Cary, Charles Dickens, John Dryden, George Eliot, T. S. Eliot, Thomas Gray, Gerard Manley Hopkins, Samuel Johnson, John Keats, Rudyard Kipling, Jenny Lind, John Masefield, John Milton, Laurence Olivier, Alexander Pope, Nicholas Rowe, Percy Bysshe Shelley, Thomas Shadwell, Alfred Tennyson and William Wordsworth. Abbey musicians such as Henry Purcell were also buried in their place of work.

The practice of burying national figures in the abbey began under Oliver Cromwell with the burial of Admiral Robert Blake, in 1657. The practice spread to include generals, admirals, politicians, doctors and scientists such as Sir Isaac Newton, buried on 4 April 1727 and Charles Darwin, buried on 19 April 1882.

British Prime Ministers buried in the abbey are: William Pitt the Elder, William Pitt the Younger, George Canning, Viscount Palmerston, William Ewart Gladstone, Bonar Law, Neville Chamberlain and Clement Attlee.

In 1864, Arthur Penrhyn Stanley was appointed dean of the abbey, and was very influential in turning it into a "national church". He invited popular preachers to draw in large congregations, and attracted crowds by arranging for celebrities of the day to be buried in the abbey, such as the writer Charles Dickens, the explorer David Livingstone, and the scientist Charles Darwin — even when those people had expressed wishes to be buried elsewhere. By 1900, so many prominent figures were buried in the abbey that the writer William Morris called it a "National Valhalla".

During the early 20th century, for reasons of space, it became increasingly common to bury cremated remains rather than coffins. In 1905, the actor Sir Henry Irving was cremated and his ashes buried in the abbey, thereby becoming the first person to be cremated prior to interment. This marked a milestone as after the death of Sir Joseph Dalton Hooker in December 1911, the Dean and Chapter of Westminster Abbey chose to offer Hooker a grave near Charles Darwin's in the nave, but also insisted that he be cremated before. His widow however declined and so Hooker's body was buried in the churchyard of St Anne's Church, Kew. The majority of interments are of cremated remains, but some burials still take place – Frances Challen, wife of the Rev. Sebastian Charles, Canon of Westminster, was buried alongside her husband in the south choir aisle in 2014. Members of the Percy family have a family vault, "The Northumberland Vault", in St Nicholas's Chapel, within the abbey. The ashes of physicist Stephen Hawking were interred in the abbey on 15 June 2018, near the grave of Sir Isaac Newton. The memorial stone, bearing the inscription 'Here lies what was mortal of Stephen Hawking 1942–2018', includes a form of the Bekenstein–Hawking entropy equation relating to black holes.

In the floor just inside the great west door, in the centre of the nave, is the tomb of The Unknown Warrior, an unidentified British soldier killed on a European battlefield during the First World War. He was buried in the abbey on 11 November 1920. There are many graves in the floors, but this is the only grave on which it is forbidden to walk.

== Burials ==
=== British monarchs and consorts ===
An estimated total of 17 English, Scottish and British monarchs are buried in the abbey, including Edward the Confessor, Henry III, Edward I, Edward III, Richard II, Henry V, Henry VII, Edward VI, Mary I, Mary Queen of Scots, Elizabeth I, James I, Charles II, Mary II, William III, Queen Anne, and George II. Elizabeth and Mary, Queen of Scots were the last monarchs to be buried with full tomb effigies; monarchs buried after them are commemorated in the abbey with simple inscriptions. In 1760, George II became the last monarch to be buried in the abbey, and George III's brother Henry Frederick became the last member of the royal family to be buried in the abbey in 1790. Most monarchs after George II have been buried either in St George's Chapel, Windsor Castle or at the Royal Burial Ground, Frogmore to the east of Windsor Castle.

In 1290, Eleanor of Castile, queen of Edward I, died in Nottinghamshire. Over the course of several days, the body was brought to Westminster Abbey, and at each of the places the cortège rested, an Eleanor cross was erected in memory. The most famous of these is Charing Cross, the last stop before the funeral. Eleanor of Castile is buried in the abbey alongside her husband.

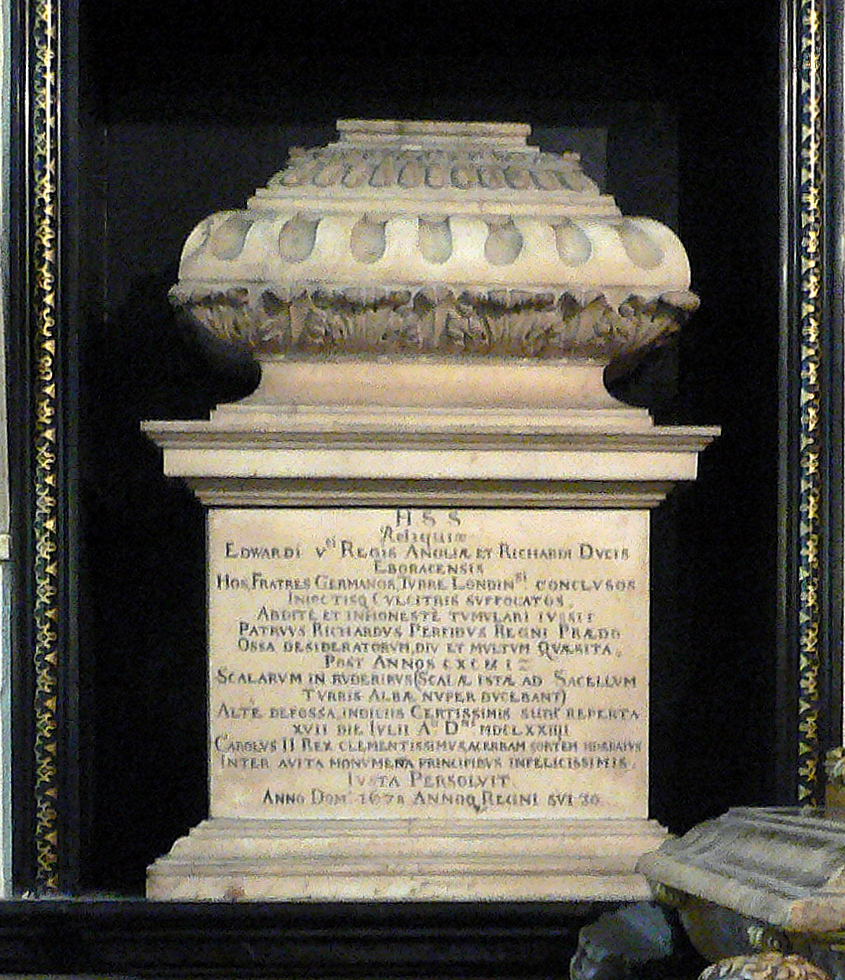
The tomb of two children in the Henry VII Chapel, thought to be the Princes in the Tower

In 1483, the boy king Edward V and his brother, Richard (known collectively as the Princes in the Tower), disappeared while preparing for Edward's coronation at the Tower of London. Although it is not known for sure what happened to the boys, historians have suspected their uncle, who became Richard III, of having them murdered. In 1674, the remains of two children were discovered at the Tower, and were buried in Westminster Abbey with royal honours. In 1933, the bones were studied by an anatomist who suggested that they might indeed be the remains of the two princes. Requests to test the DNA of the bones to determine their provenance have been refused, both by the abbey and Queen Elizabeth II, with a spokesperson for the abbey saying, "the mortal remains of two young children [...] should not be disturbed".

Although not a royal burial, the funeral of the Lord Protector Oliver Cromwell took place at the abbey in 1658 with full honours normally only given to monarchs. On top of the coffin lay an effigy of Cromwell complete with crown. After the Restoration of Charles II in 1660, Cromwell's body was dug up, hanged, and thrown in an unmarked grave.

Audio description of the shrine of Edward the Confessor by John Hall

The following English, Scottish and British monarchs and consorts are buried in the abbey:

- Edward the Confessor, King of England, in 1066
- Edith of Wessex, Queen of England; wife of Edward the Confessor
- Matilda of Scotland, wife of Henry I
- Henry III, King of England
- Eleanor of Castile, Queen of England, in 1290 (viscera at Lincoln Cathedral and heart at Blackfriars, London); wife of Edward I
- Edward I, King of England, in 1307
- Philippa of Hainault, Queen of England, in 1370; wife of Edward III
- Edward III, King of England, in 1377
- Anne of Bohemia, Queen of England, in 1394; wife of Richard II
- Richard II, King of England, in 1413 (reburial from Kings Langley Priory)
- Henry V, King of England, in 1422
- Catherine of Valois, Queen of England; wife of Henry V
- Possibly the Princes in the Tower (Edward V, King of England, and his younger brother, Richard of Shrewsbury, Duke of York), (Note: In 1674 the remains of two boys were exhumed from the Tower of London and at the orders of Charles II, they were interred in the wall of the Henry VII Lady Chapel. Westminster Abbey says this: "The urn was opened on 6th July 1933 to examine the bones to try to ascertain if they were human remains. Not all the bones were there as some had been lost or given away when they were found in 1674. The remaining bones were of two young children. The Lady Chapel was closed during the examination and on 11th July the bones were carefully wrapped up and replaced in the urn by the Dean with a parchment recording what had been done. He then read part of the burial service and the urn was re-sealed.") sons of Edward IV and Elizabeth Woodville
- Anne Neville, Queen of England, in 1485; wife of Edward of Westminster, Prince of Wales and Richard III
- Elizabeth of York, Queen of England, in 1503; wife of Henry VII
- Henry VII, King of England, in 1509
- Edward VI, King of England, in 1553
- Anne of Cleves, Queen of England, in 1557; fourth wife of Henry VIII
- Mary I, Queen of England, in 1558
- Mary, Queen of Scotland and Queen Dowager of France, in 1612 (reburial from Peterborough Cathedral); mother of James VI and I
- Elizabeth I, Queen of England, in 1603 (Note: In the 19th century, researchers looking for the tomb of James VI and I partially opened the underground vault containing the remains of Elizabeth I and Mary I of England. The lead coffins were stacked, with Elizabeth's resting on top of her half-sister's.)
- Anne of Denmark, Queen of England and Scotland, in 1619; wife of James VI and I
- James VI and I, King of England and Scotland, in 1625 (Note: The position of the tomb of King James was lost for two and a half centuries. In the 19th century, following an excavation of many of the vaults beneath the floor, the lead coffin was found in the Henry VII vault.)
- Charles II, King of England and Scotland, in 1685
- Mary II, Queen of England and Scotland, in 1695
- William III, King of England and Scotland, in 1702
- Prince George of Denmark, Duke of Cumberland, in 1708; husband of Anne, Queen of Great Britain
- Anne, Queen of Great Britain, in 1714
- Caroline of Ansbach, Queen of Great Britain, in 1737; wife of George II
- George II, King of Great Britain, in 1760

=== Other royal relatives ===
- Edmund Crouchback, Earl of Leicester and Lancaster, in 1301; son of Henry III and Eleanor of Provence
- Katherine of England; daughter of Henry III and Eleanor of Provence
- Henry of England, in 1274; son of Edward I and Eleanor of Castile
- Alphonso of England, Earl of Chester, in 1284 (heart at Blackfriars, London); son of Edward I and Eleanor of Castile
- Eleanor of England, Countess of Bar, in 1298; daughter of Edward I and Eleanor of Castile
- John of Eltham, Earl of Cornwall, in 1337; son of Edward II and Isabella of France
- Thomas of Woodstock, Duke of Gloucester, in 1397; son of Edward III and Philippa of Hainault
- Eleanor de Bohun, Duchess of Gloucester, in 1399; wife of Thomas of Woodstock
- Elizabeth Tudor, in 1495; daughter of Henry VII and Elizabeth of York
- Edmund Tudor, Duke of Somerset, in 1500; son of Henry VII and Elizabeth of York
- Lady Margaret Beaufort, Countess of Richmond and Derby; mother of Henry VII
- Henry Tudor, Duke of Cornwall, in 1511; son of Henry VIII and Catherine of Aragon
- Charles Stuart, 1st Earl of Lennox; great-grandson of Henry VII and paternal uncle to James VI and I
- Lady Margaret Douglas, Countess of Lennox; daughter of Margaret Tudor and Archibald Douglas, 6th Earl of Angus
- Henry Frederick Stuart, Prince of Wales, in 1612; son of James VI and I and Anne of Denmark
- Lady Arbella Stuart; great-great-granddaughter of Henry VII and paternal cousin to James VI and I
- Charles James Stuart, Duke of Cornwall; infant son of Charles I and Henrietta Maria of France
- Anne Stuart, in 1640; infant daughter of Charles I and Henrietta Maria of France
- Mary Stuart, Princess Royal and Princess consort of Orange, in 1660; daughter of Charles I and Henrietta Maria of France; mother of William III
- Henry Stuart, Duke of Gloucester, in 1660; son of Charles I and Henrietta Maria of France
- Charles Stuart, Duke of Cambridge, in 1661; son of James II and Anne Hyde
- Elizabeth Stuart, Electress consort of the Palatinate and Queen consort of Bohemia, in 1662; daughter of James VI and I and Anne of Denmark; grandmother of George I
- James Stuart, Duke of Cambridge, in 1667; son of James II and Anne Hyde
- Charles Stuart, Duke of Kendal, in 1667; son of James II and Anne Hyde
- Anne (née Hyde), Duchess of York and Albany, in 1671; first wife of James II
- Edgar Stuart, Duke of Cambridge, in 1671; son of James II and Anne Hyde
- Prince Rupert of the Rhine, Duke of Cumberland, in 1682; son of Elizabeth Stuart and Frederick V, Elector Palatine of the Rhine
- Prince William, Duke of Gloucester, in 1700; son of Anne, Queen of Great Britain and Prince George of Denmark
- Other infant children of Anne, Queen of Great Britain
- Prince George William of Great Britain, in 1718; infant son of George II and Caroline of Ansbach
- Frederick, Prince of Wales, in 1751; son of George II and Caroline of Ansbach; father of George III
- Princess Caroline of Great Britain, in 1758; daughter of George II and Caroline of Ansbach
- Princess Elizabeth of Great Britain, in 1759; daughter of Frederick, Prince of Wales and Augusta of Saxe-Gotha-Altenburg
- Prince William, Duke of Cumberland, in 1765; son of George II and Caroline of Ansbach
- Prince Frederick of Great Britain, in 1766; son of Frederick, Prince of Wales and Augusta of Saxe-Gotha-Altenburg
- Prince Edward, Duke of York and Albany, in 1767; son of Frederick, Prince of Wales and Augusta of Saxe-Gotha-Altenburg
- Princess Louisa of Great Britain, in 1768; daughter of Frederick, Prince of Wales and Augusta of Saxe-Gotha-Altenburg
- Augusta of Saxe-Gotha-Altenburg, Princess of Wales, in 1772; wife of Frederick, Prince of Wales
- Prince Alfred of Great Britain, in 1782 (later moved to St George's Chapel, Windsor Castle); son of George III and Charlotte of Mecklenburg-Strelitz
- Prince Octavius of Great Britain, in 1783 (later moved to St George's Chapel, Windsor Castle); son of George III and Charlotte of Mecklenburg-Strelitz
- Princess Amelia of Great Britain, in 1786; daughter of George II and Caroline of Ansbach
- Prince Henry, Duke of Cumberland and Strathearn, in 1790; son of Frederick, Prince of Wales and Augusta of Saxe-Gotha-Altenburg

=== Nave ===
The following are buried in the nave:

- Field Marshal Edmund Allenby, 1st Viscount Allenby
- John André
- The Right Reverend Francis Atterbury, Bishop of Rochester
- Clement Attlee, 1st Earl Attlee
- Sir Herbert Baker
- Sir Charles Barry
- William Bell
- Ernest Bevin
- Angela Burdett-Coutts, 1st Baroness Burdett-Coutts
- Edward Carpenter
- Wesley Carr
- Neville Chamberlain

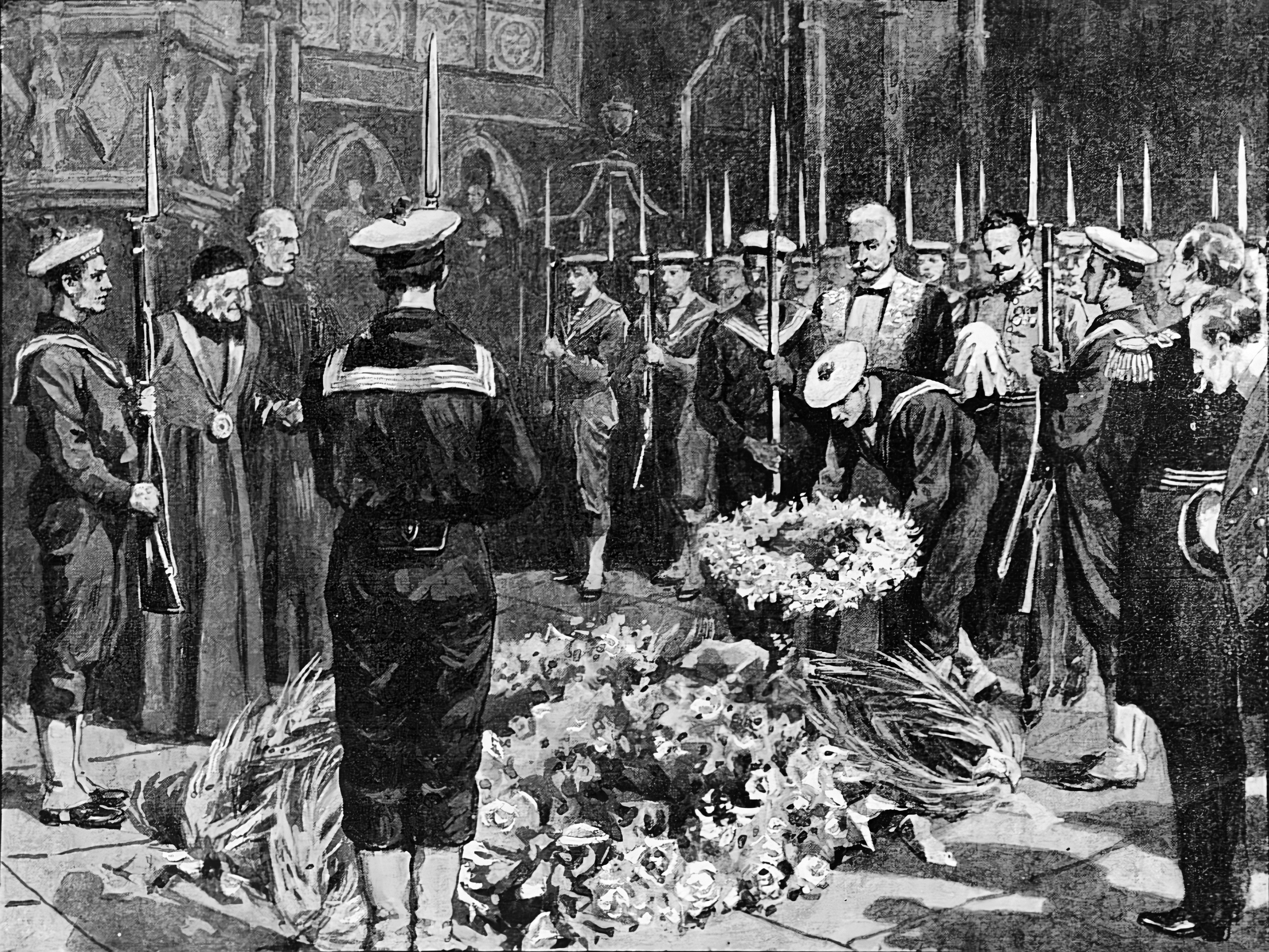
Brazilian sailors pay floral tribute to British naval flag officer Thomas Cochrane in 1901

- Admiral of the Red Thomas Cochrane, 10th Earl of Dundonald and Marquess of Maranhão
- William Cockburn
- Vice Admiral Charles Cornewall
- Charles Darwin
- Joost de Blank, Archbishop of Cape Town
- Freeman Freeman-Thomas, 1st Marquess of Willingdon
- George Graham
- Stephen Hawking
- Sir John Herschel, 1st Baronet
- John Hunter (surgeon)
- Benjamin "Ben" Jonson (buried upright)
- Andrew Bonar Law
- William Levinz (d. 1765), son of William Levinz
- David Livingstone (heart buried in Zambia)
- Sir Charles Lyell, 1st Baronet
- Kenneth Mackenzie, Lord Fortrose
- Sir Isaac Newton
- Field Marshal Herbert Plumer, 1st Viscount Plumer
- Sir George Pollock, 1st Baronet
- Ernest Rutherford, 1st Baron Rutherford of Nelson
- Sir George Gilbert Scott
- Lieutant-General William Seymour
- Robert Stephenson
- Ludovic Stewart, 2nd Duke of Lennox and 1st Duke of Richmond
- George Stone and family
- George Edmund Street
- Thomas Telford
- Sir Joseph John "J.J." Thomson
- William Thomson, 1st Baron Kelvin
- Thomas Tompion
- The Unknown Warrior (entombed in 1920)
- Beatrice Webb, Baroness Passfield
- Sidney Webb, 1st Baron Passfield

=== North transept ===
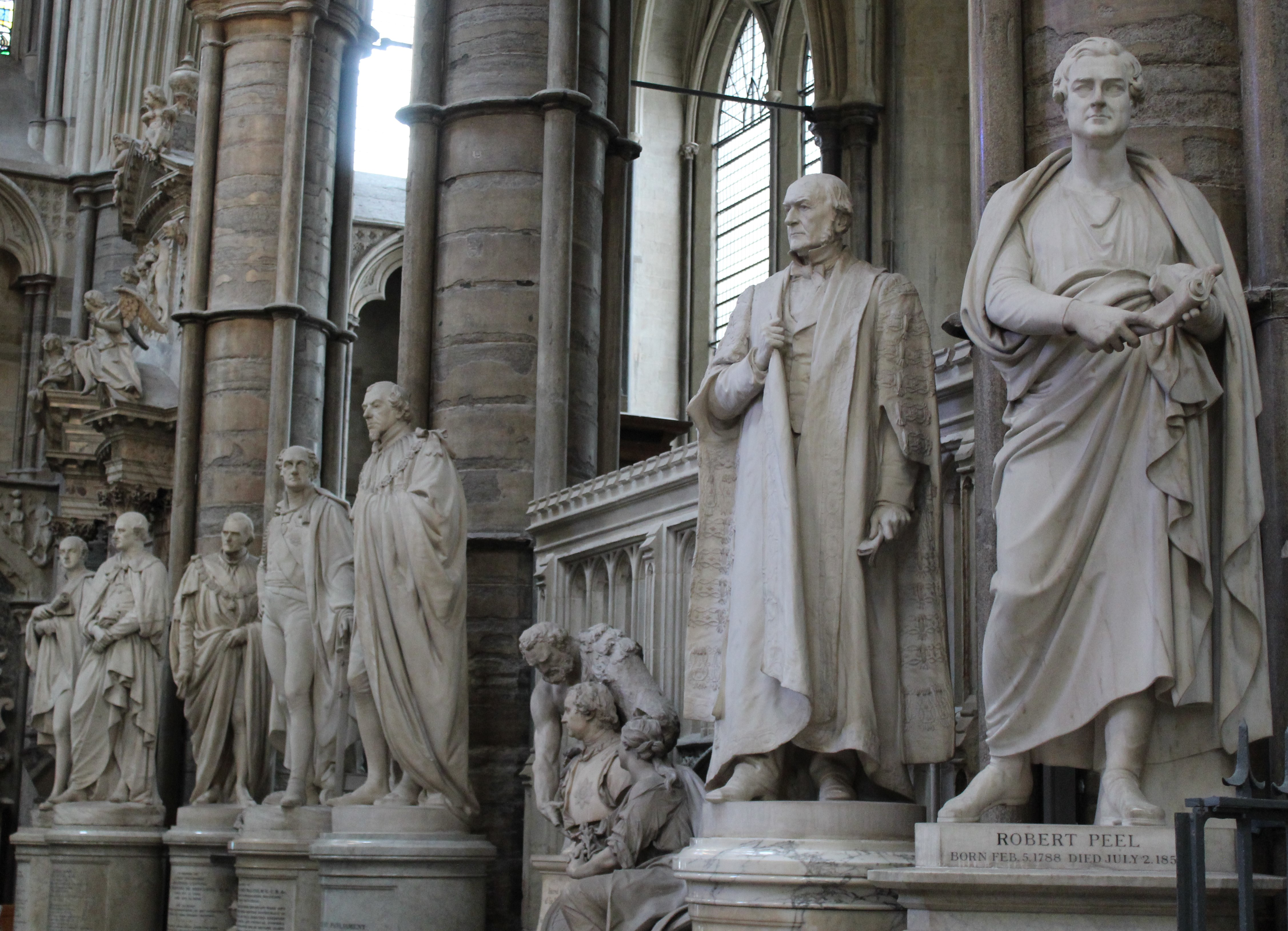
East side of the north transept, from left to right, George, Charles and Stratford Canning, General John Malcom, Benjamin Disraeli, Admiral Peter Warren, William Gladstone and Robert Peel

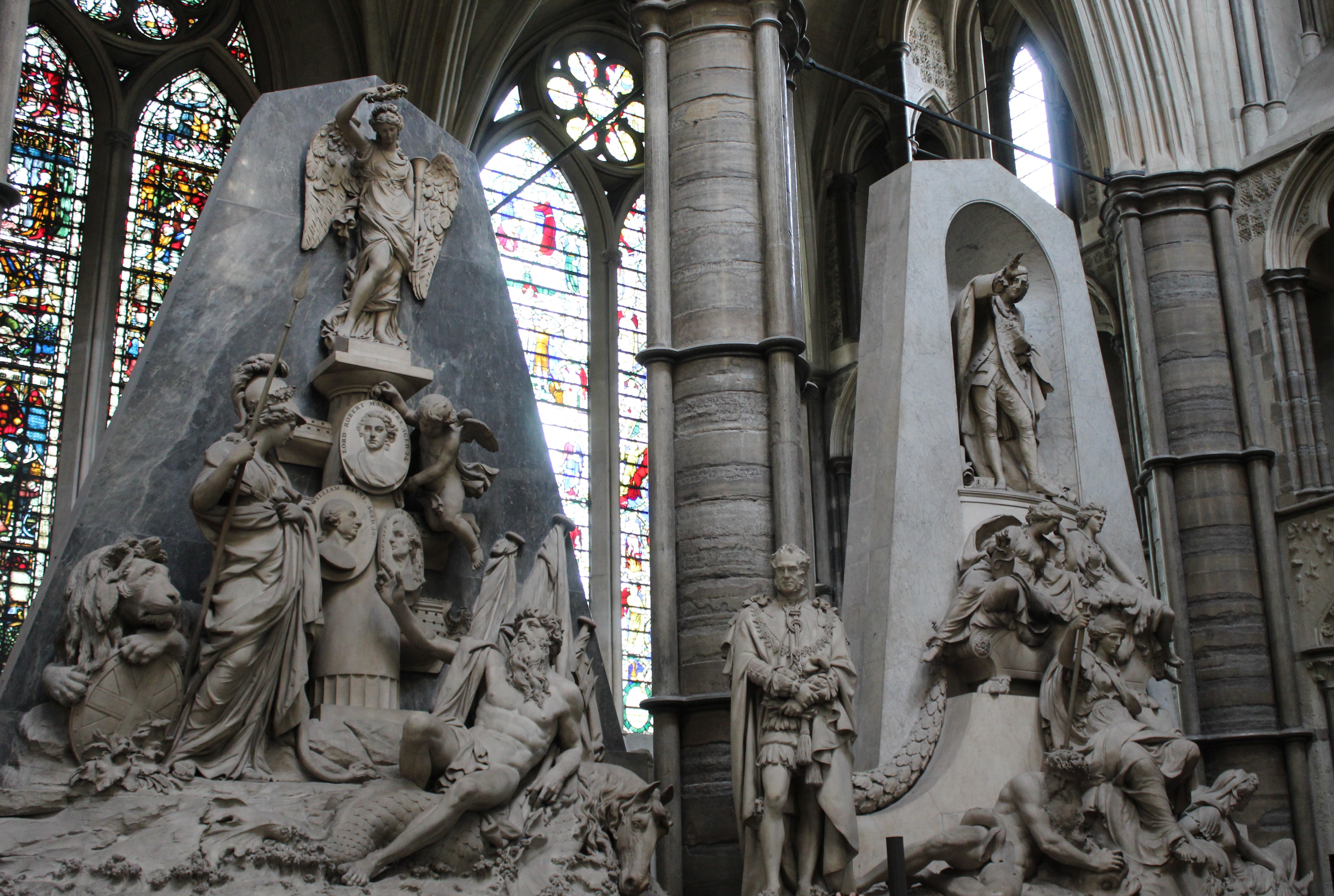
West side of the north transept, from left to right, monument to Captains William Bayne, William Blair and Robert Manners, statue of Lord Palmerston, monument to William Pitt the Elder

The following are buried in the north transept:

- Charles Abbot, 1st Baron Colchester
- Samuel Bradford
- Sir Edward Broughton
- George Canning
- Charles Canning, 1st Earl Canning
- William Pitt the Elder, 1st Earl of Chatham
- Welbore Ellis, 1st Baron Mendip
- Charles James Fox
- William Ewart Gladstone
- Henry Grattan
- Joshua Guest
- Rear-Admiral Sir John Lindsay
- Major General Sir John Malcolm
- David Murray, 2nd Earl of Mansfield and 7th Viscount of Stormont
- William Murray, 1st Earl of Mansfield
- Theodore Paleologus II
- William Pitt the Younger
- Robert Stewart, 2nd Marquess of Londonderry
- Henry John Temple, 3rd Viscount Palmerston
- Sir Hugh Vaughan
- William Wilberforce

=== South transept ===
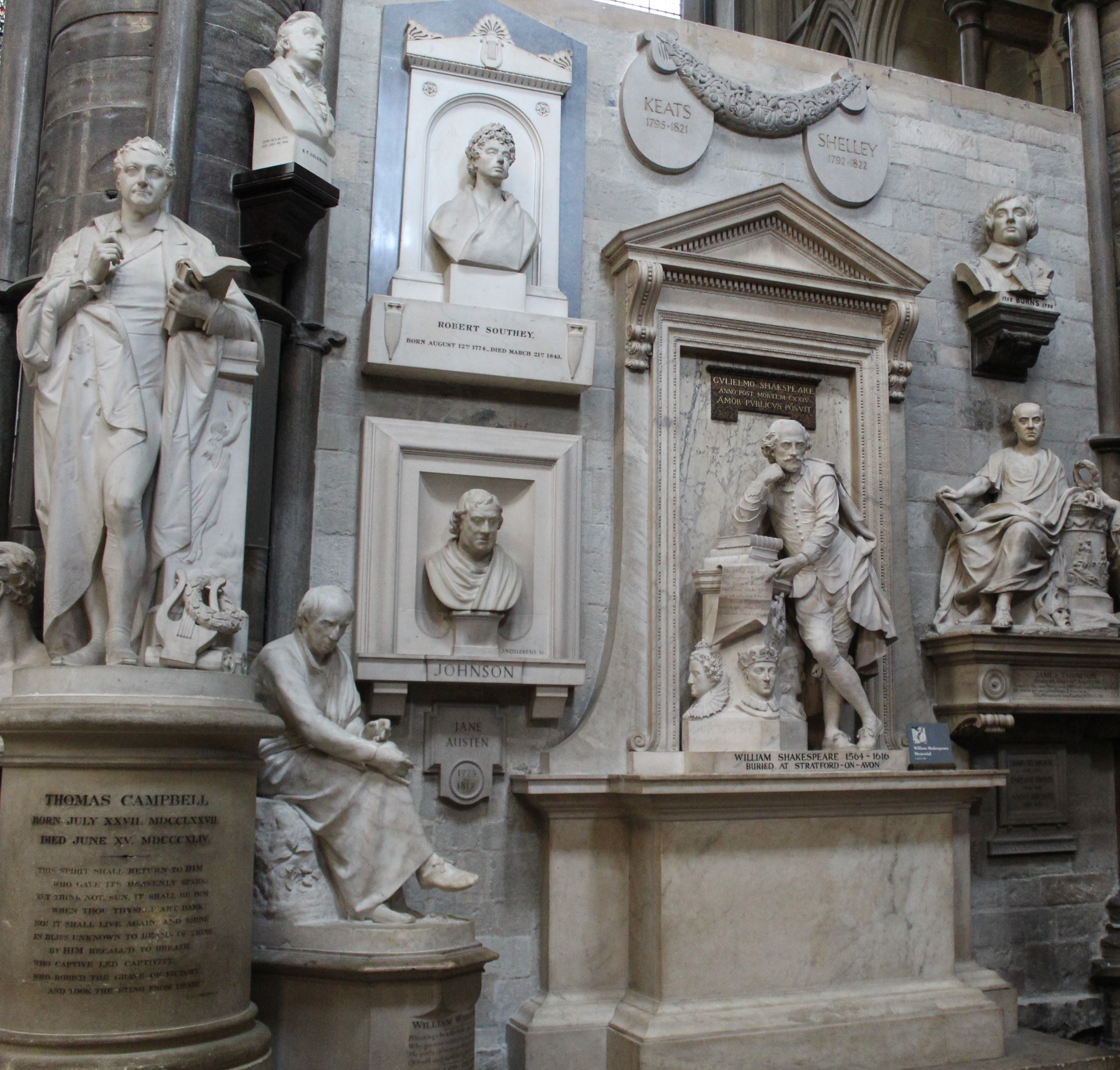
View of Poets' Corner

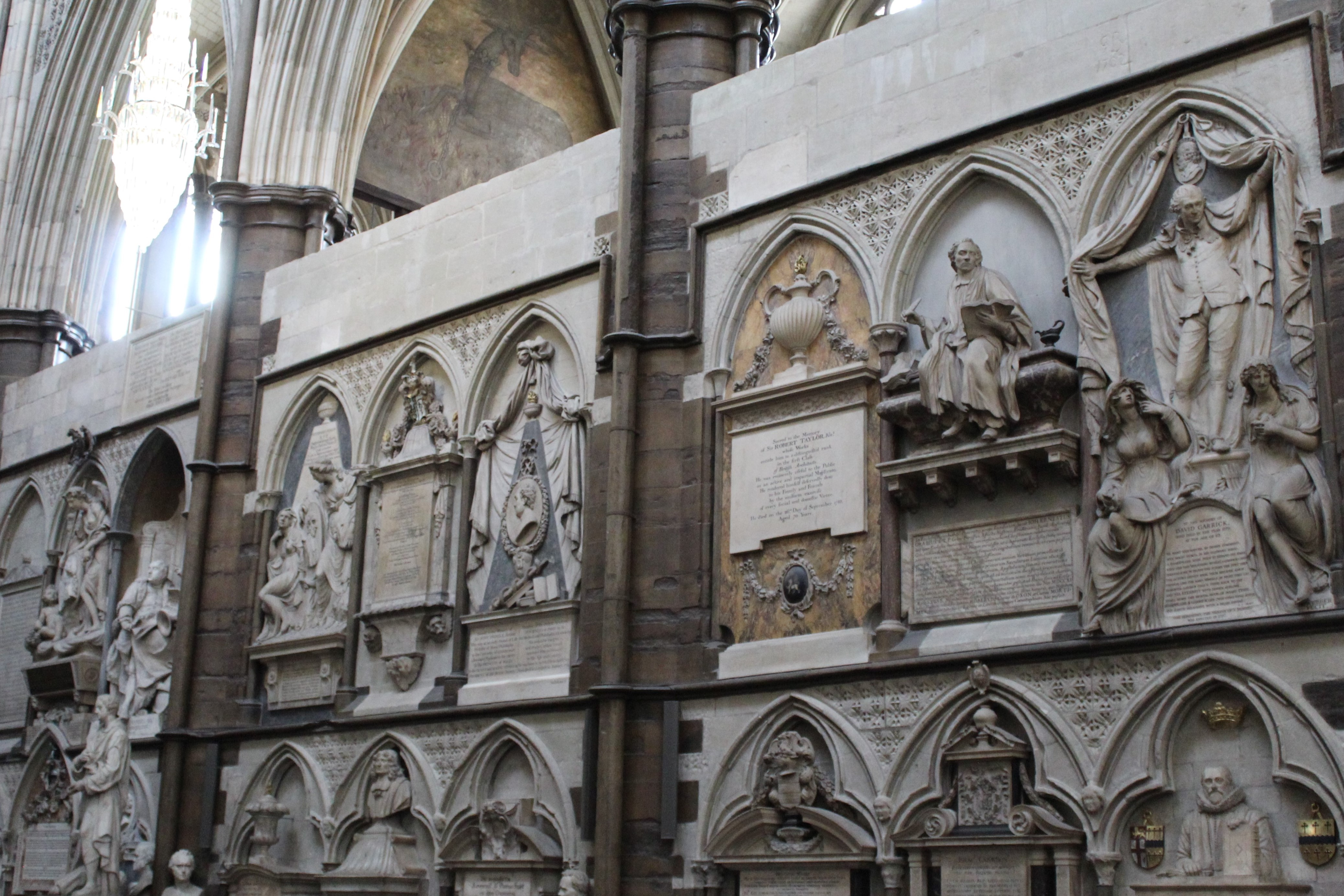
View of the west wall of Poets' Corner

The following are buried in the south transept which is known as the Poets' Corner:

- Robert Adam
- Joseph Addison
- Edward Aspinwall
- Robert Browning and Elizabeth Barrett Browning
- William Camden
- Field Marshal John Campbell, 2nd Duke of Argyll
- Thomas Campbell
- Geoffrey Chaucer
- William Congreve
- Abraham Cowley
- Sir William Davenant
- Sir John Denham
- Charles Dickens
- Michael Drayton
- John Dryden
- Adam Fox
- David Garrick
- John Gay
- Gabriel Goodman
- George Frideric Handel
- Thomas Hardy (heart buried in Stinsford)
- William Heather
- Hugh Holland
- Sir Henry Irving
- Samuel Johnson
- Rudyard Kipling
- Thomas Babington Macaulay, 1st Baron Macaulay
- John Masefield
- Sir Robert Moray
- Gilbert Murray
- Anne Oldfield
- Laurence Olivier, Baron Olivier
- Thomas "Old Tom" Parr
- Richard Brinsley Sheridan
- Edmund Spenser
- Alfred Tennyson, 1st Baron Tennyson

=== Cloisters ===
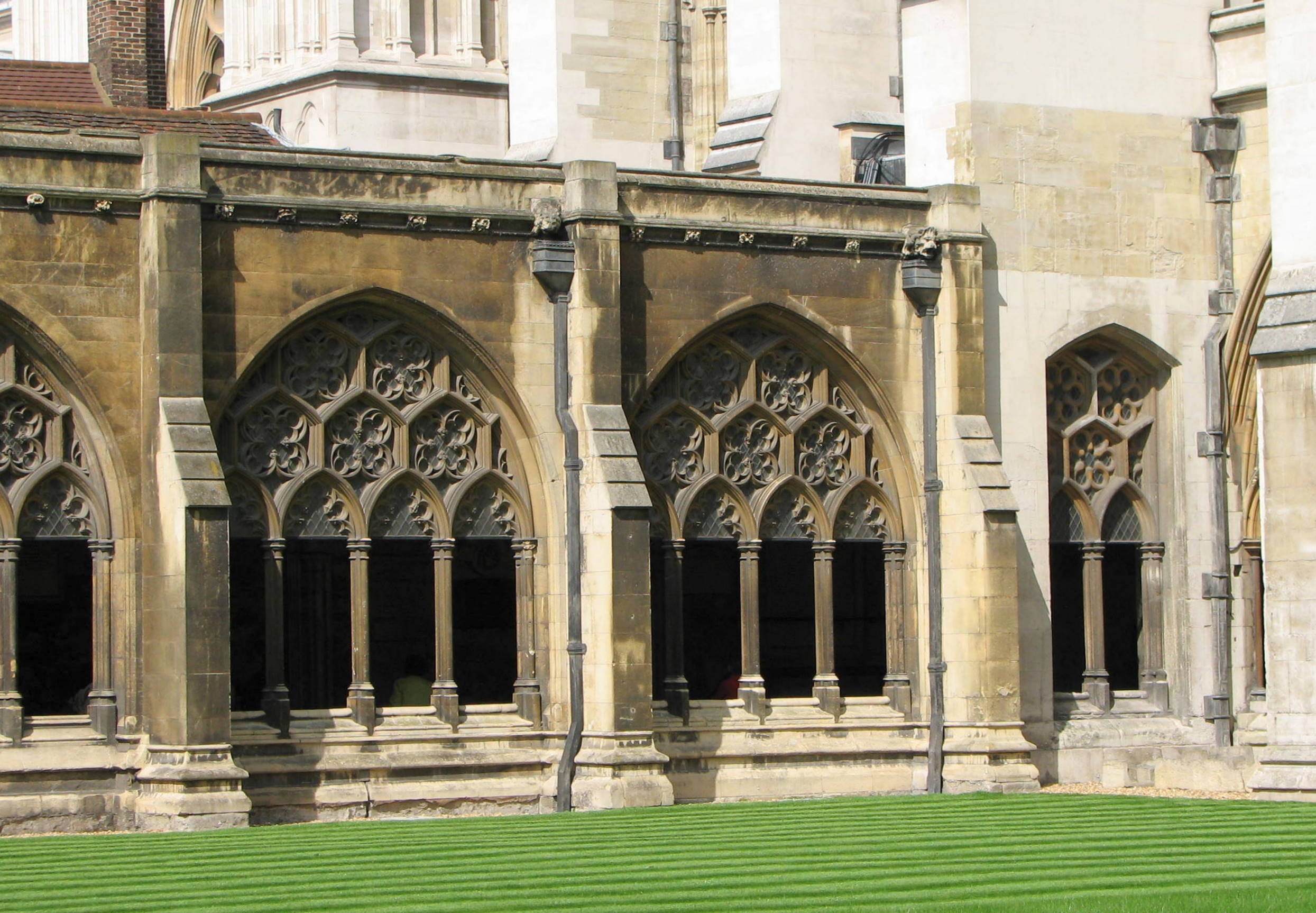
The cloister and garth

The following are buried in the cloisters:

- Arthur Agarde
- William Aglionby
- Edmund Ayrton
- Thomas Baltzar
- Spranger Barry and Ann Street Barry
- Aphra Behn
- Thomas Betterton
- Thomas "Tom" Brown
- General John Burgoyne
- Muzio Clementi
- Benjamin Cooke
- Robert Cooke
- Percival "Percy" Dearmer
- Robinson Duckworth
- Laurence of Durham, Abbot c. 1158–1173
- Ian Fraser, Baron Fraser of Lonsdale
- Christopher Gibbons
- Jeremy Heywood, Baron Heywood of Whitehall
- William de Humez, Abbot 1214–1222
- Henry Lawes
- Howard Nixon
- John Parsons
- Daniel Pulteney
- John Rae
- Johann Peter Salomon
- William Shield
- Herbert Thorndike
- John Thorndike
- William Turner
- George Ebenezer Williams
- James Wright

=== North choir aisle ===
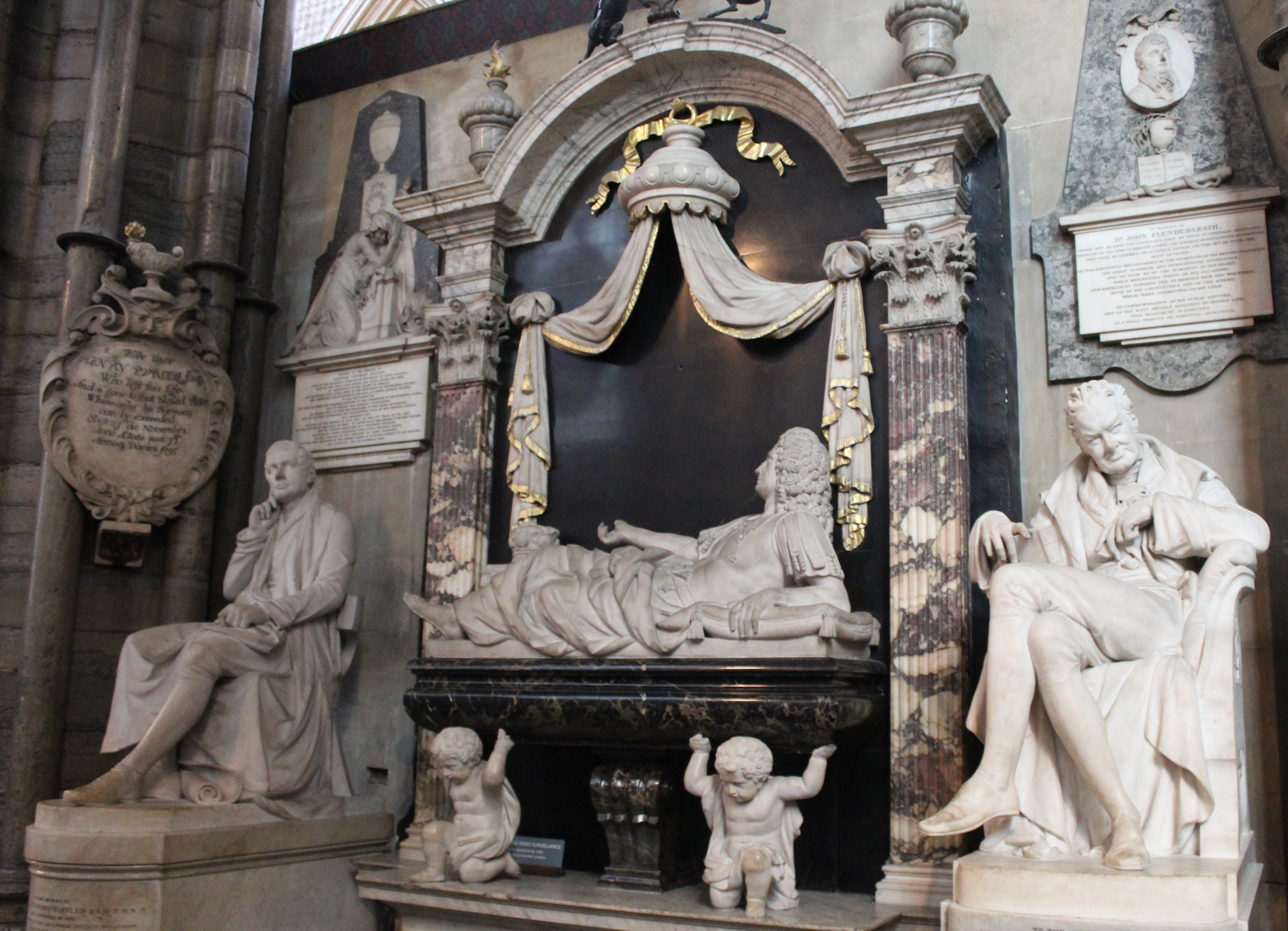
Monuments in the north choir aisle, including those to Stamford Raffles, Almeric de Courcy and William Wilberforce

The following are buried in the north choir aisle:

- John Blow
- Henry Purcell
- Almeric de Courcy, 23rd Baron Kingsale
- John Robinson
- Admiral Sir Edward Spragge
- Ralph Vaughan Williams
- Sir William Sterndale Bennett
- William Croft
- Herbert Howells
- Sir Charles Villiers Stanford

=== South choir aisle ===
The following are buried in the south choir aisle:

- Andrew Bell
- James Kendall
- Sir Robert Long, 1st Baronet
- Sir Paul Methuen
- Admiral of the Fleet Sir Cloudesley Shovell
- Dame Sybil Thorndike, Lady Casson
- Charles Whitworth, 1st Baron Whitworth

=== Ambulatory chapels ===
The following are buried in the ambulatory chapels:

==== St John the Baptist Chapel ====
- Charles Berkeley, 1st Earl of Falmouth
- John Carey, 2nd Earl of Dover
- Thomas Cecil, 1st Earl of Exeter
- Dorothy Cecil, Countess of Exeter; first wife of Thomas Cecil and daughter of John Neville, 4th Baron Latimer
- George Goring, 1st Earl of Norwich
- Richard Jones, 1st Earl of Ranelagh
- Sir John Ogle
- Thomas Panton
- John Vaughan, 3rd Earl of Carbery

==== St Nicholas' Chapel ====
Northumberland Vault:

- George Seymour, Viscount Beauchamp; only son of Algernon Seymour, 7th Duke of Somerset
- General Algernon Seymour, 7th Duke of Somerset
- Frances Seymour, Duchess of Somerset; wife of Algernon Seymour, 7th Duke of Somerset and paternal granddaughter of Thomas Thynne, 1st Viscount Weymouth
- Lady Elizabeth Percy; only daughter of Hugh Percy, 1st Duke of Northumberland
- Elizabeth Percy, Duchess of Northumberland and 2nd Baroness Percy; wife of Hugh Percy, 1st Duke of Northumberland and daughter of Algernon Seymour, 7th Duke of Somerset
- Elizabeth Percy; second daughter of Algernon Percy, 1st Earl of Beverley
- Lady Charlotte Percy; eldest daughter of Hugh Percy, 2nd Duke of Northumberland
- Hugh Percy, 1st Duke of Northumberland
- Lord Henry Percy; second son of Hugh Percy, 2nd Duke of Northumberland
- Lady Louisa Percy; fifth daughter of Algernon Percy, 1st Earl of Beverley
- Hon. Algernon Percy; eldest son of George Percy, 5th Duke of Northumberland
- Hon. Henry Percy; second son of George Percy, 5th Duke of Northumberland
- Hon. Margaret Percy; second daughter of George Percy, 5th Duke of Northumberland
- Isabella Percy, Countess of Beverley; wife of Algernon Percy, 1st Earl of Beverley and daughter of Peter Burrell; sister of Frances Percy, Duchess of Northumberland
- Lieutenant General Hugh Percy, 2nd Duke of Northumberland
- Lady Elizabeth Percy; second daughter of Hugh Percy, 2nd Duke of Northumberland
- Frances Percy, Duchess of Northumberland; second wife of Hugh Percy, 2nd Duke of Northumberland and daughter of Peter Burrell; sister of Isabella Percy, Countess of Beverley
- Hugh Percy, 3rd Duke of Northumberland
- Lady Agnes Buller; wife of Major General Frederick Thomas Buller and twin sister of Hugh Percy, 3rd Duke of Northumberland
- Admiral Algernon Percy, 4th Duke of Northumberland
- Charlotte Percy, Duchess of Northumberland; wife of the Hugh Percy, 3rd Duke of Northumberland and daughter of Edward Clive, 1st Earl of Powis; governess of Princess Alexandrina Victoria of Kent (the future Queen Victoria)
- George Percy, 5th Duke of Northumberland
- General Lord Henry Percy; fifth son of George Percy, 5th Duke of Northumberland and recipient of the Victoria Cross
- Lady Louisa Percy; eldest daughter of George Percy, 5th Duke of Northumberland
- Louisa Percy, Duchess of Northumberland; wife of Algernon Percy, 6th Duke of Northumberland and daughter of Henry Drummond
- Algernon Percy, 6th Duke of Northumberland
- Alan Percy, 8th Duke of Northumberland
- Helen Percy, Duchess of Northumberland; wife of Alan Percy, 8th Duke of Northumberland and daughter of Charles Gordon-Lennox, 7th Duke of Richmond
- Hugh Percy, 10th Duke of Northumberland (ashes)
- Elizabeth Percy, Duchess of Northumberland (ashes); wife of Hugh Percy, 10th Duke of Northumberland and daughter of Walter Montagu Douglas Scott, 8th Duke of Buccleuch; paternal niece of Princess Alice, Duchess of Gloucester

Others:

- Anne Stanley, Countess of Ancram

==== St Paul's Chapel ====
- Katherine Percy, Countess of Northumberland; wife of Henry Percy, 8th Earl of Northumberland and daughter of John Neville, 4th Baron Latimer
- Sir Lewis de Robessart, Baron Bourchier
- Elizabeth Bourchier, 4th Baroness Bourchier
- Robert Benson, 1st Baron Bingley
- John Ramsay, 1st Earl of Holderness
- Francis Cottington, 1st Baron Cottington
- Charles Blount, 8th Baron Mountjoy

==== Other ambulatory chapels ====
- Sir Robert Aytoun
- Lionel Cranfield, 1st Earl of Middlesex
- Sir Rowland Hill
- Frances, Lady Ingram; wife of Sir Thomas Ingram and daughter of Thomas Belasyse, 1st Viscount Fauconberg
- Mary Ingram; daughter of Sir Thomas Ingram
- Sir Thomas Ingram
- Simon Langham
- Edward Talbot, 8th Earl of Shrewsbury
- William de Valence, 1st Earl of Pembroke
- George Villiers, 1st Duke of Buckingham
- Katherine Villiers, Duchess of Buckingham and 18th Baroness de Ros of Helmsley; wife of George Villiers, 1st Duke of Buckingham and daughter of Francis Manners, 6th Earl of Rutland

=== Henry VII's Lady Chapel ===
The following are buried in the Henry VII's Chapel:

- Antoine Philippe d'Orléans, Duke of Montpensier; brother of Louis Philippe I of France
- Joseph Addison (a white marble statue in Poets' Corner)
- Air Chief Marshal Hugh Dowding, 1st Baron Dowding
- George Monck, 1st Duke of Albemarle
- George Savile, 1st Marquess of Halifax
- Marshal of the Royal Air Force Hugh Trenchard, 1st Viscount Trenchard
- Major General Charles Worsley (no memorial remains)

Unknown location

- Sir Arthur Ingram (omission from the main burial register during the English Civil War)

== Memorials ==
The following are commemorated in the abbey and/or had their memorial service in the abbey, but were buried elsewhere:

=== Individuals ===
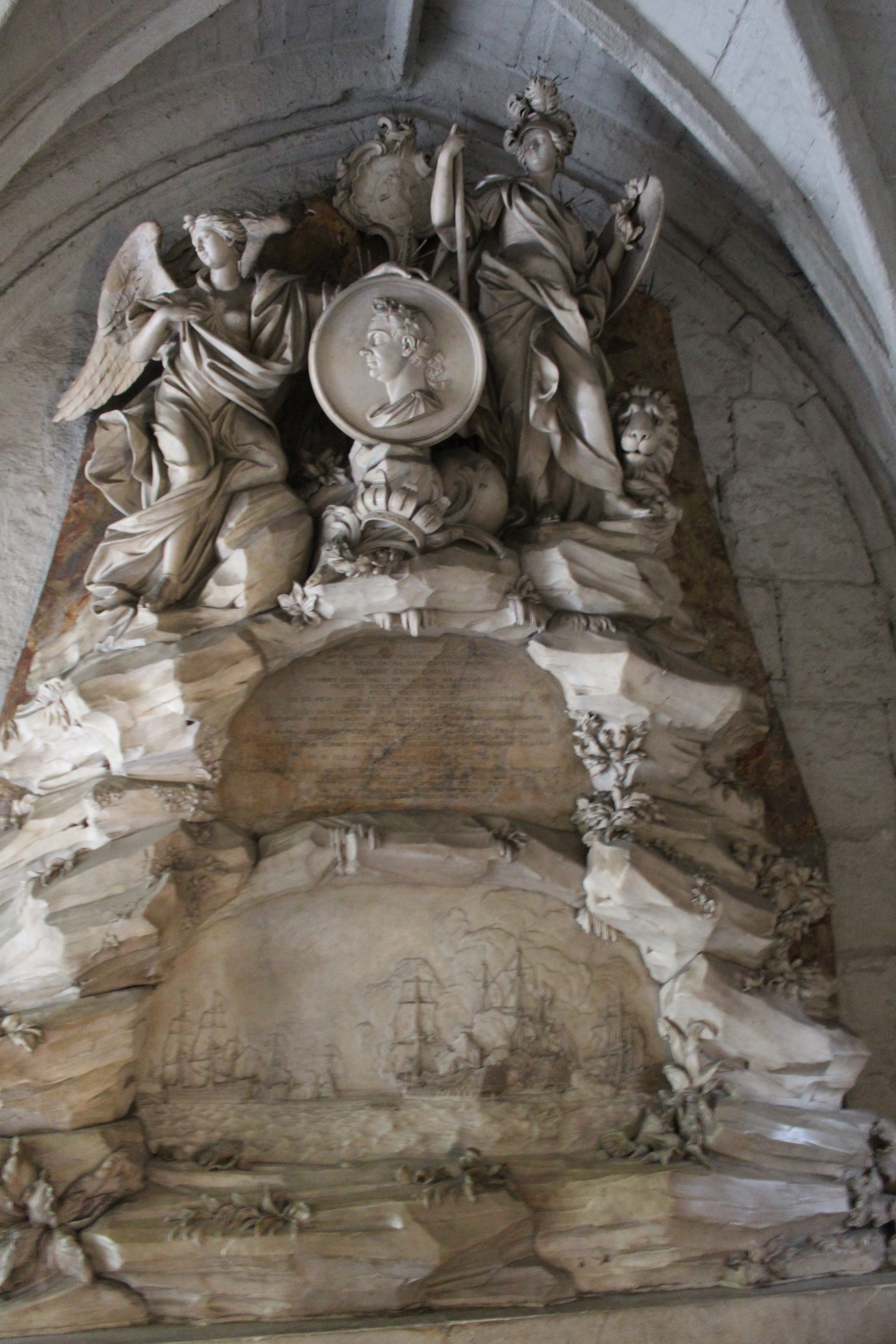
Monument to James Cornewall

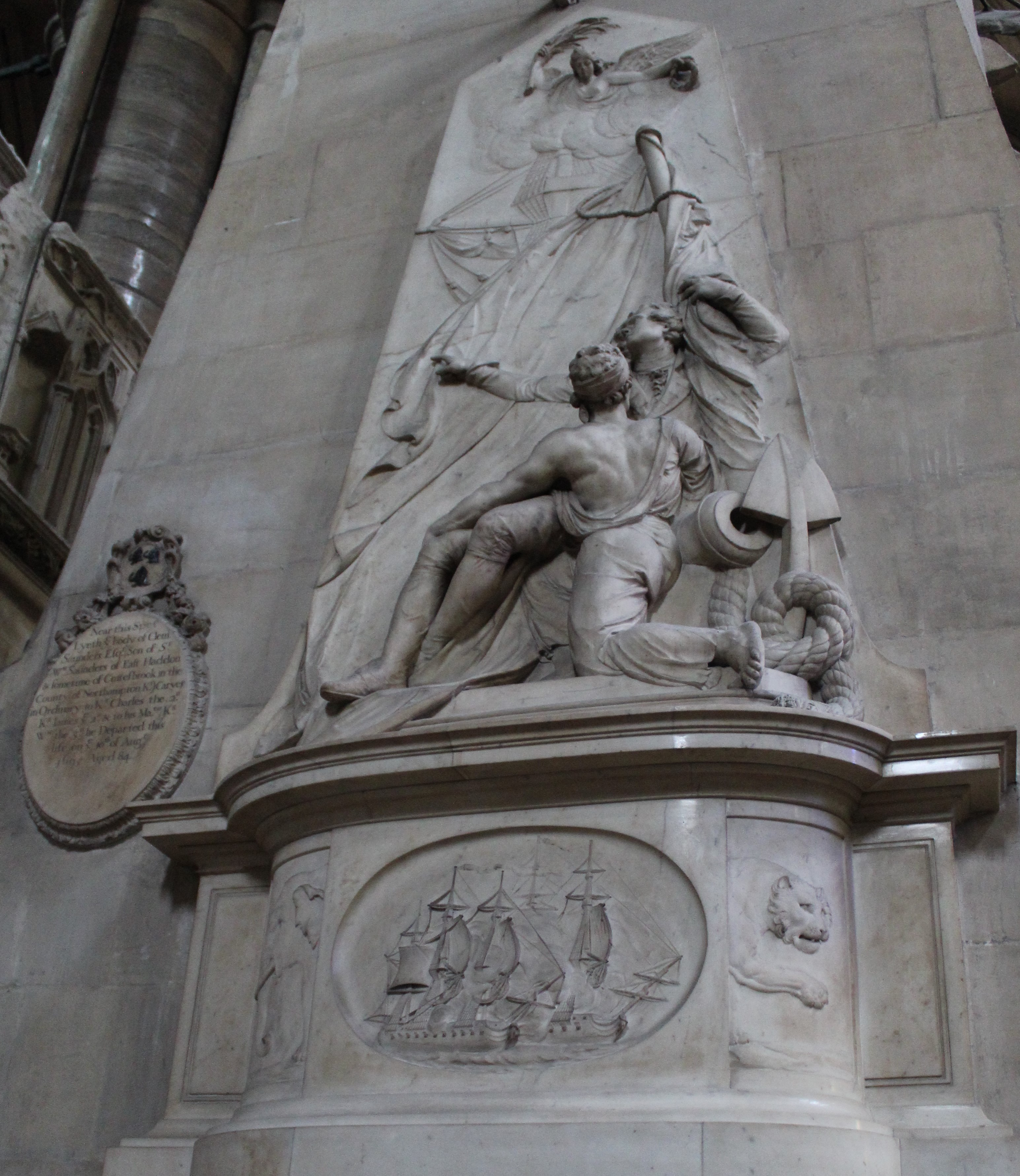
Monument to Captain Edward Cooke

- Christopher Anstey — buried at St Swithin's Church, Bath, Somerset
- Dame Peggy Ashcroft — cremated at Golders Green Crematorium, London; ashes scattered in the Great Garden at New Place, Stratford-upon-Avon, Warwickshire
- Wystan Hugh "W. H." Auden — buried in Kirchstetten, Austria
- Jane Austen — buried in Winchester Cathedral, Hampshire
- Lieutenant General Robert Baden-Powell, 1st Baron Baden-Powell — buried in alongside the ashes of his wife, Olave Baden-Powell, Baroness Baden-Powell, in Nyeri, Kenya
- Stanley Baldwin, 1st Earl Baldwin of Bewdley — cremated at Birmingham; ashes buried in Worcester Cathedral, Worcestershire
- Admiral Robert Blake — initially buried in the abbey, but moved to St Margaret's, Westminster in 1661
- William Booth — buried in Abney Park Cemetery, Stoke Newington, London
- Sir Adrian Boult — body willed to science
- Benjamin Britten, Baron Britten of Aldeburgh — buried at St Peter and St Paul's Church, Aldeburgh, Suffolk
- Charlotte and Emily Brontë — buried in the family vault at St Michael and All Angels' Church, Haworth, West Yorkshire; Anne Brontë is buried in at St Mary's Church, Scarborough, North Yorkshire
- George Byron, 6th Baron Byron — buried at the Church of St Mary Magdalene, Hucknall, Nottinghamshire
- Sir Henry Campbell-Bannerman — buried in Meigle, Perthshire
- Sir Winston Churchill — buried at St Martin's Church, Bladon, Oxfordshire
- John Clare — buried at St Botolph's Church, Helpston, Cambridgeshire
- Captain James Cornewall — buried at sea off Toulon; his monument was the first ever to be erected by Parliament at public expense
- Captain Edward Cooke — buried in Calcutta, India
- Sir Noël Coward — buried on the grounds of his home, Firefly Estate, Jamaica
- William Cowper — honoured with a stained glass window unveiled by George William Childs in 1875; buried in the St Thomas of Canterbury Chapel, at St Nicholas's Church, East Dereham, Norfolk
- Oliver Cromwell — originally buried at what is now the RAF Chapel at the far eastern end of the Abbey; he was disinterred and ultimately his body may have been buried at Tyburn, Marylebone, and head buried at Sidney Sussex College, Cambridge
- Diana, Princess of Wales — buried at Althorp, West Northamptonshire
- Richard Dimbleby — ashes buried at St Peter's Church, Linchmere, West Sussex
- Paul Dirac — buried in Tallahassee, Florida
- Benjamin Disraeli, 1st Earl of Beaconsfield — buried at the Church of St Michael and All Angels, Hughenden Manor, Buckinghamshire
- Sir Francis Drake — buried at sea off Portobelo, Panama
- Sir Edward Elgar, 1st Baronet — buried at St Wulstan's Roman Catholic Church, Little Malvern, Worcestershire
- Howard Florey, Baron Florey — buried in Marston, Oxfordshire
- Sir John Franklin — presumably buried at sea near King William Island, Canada

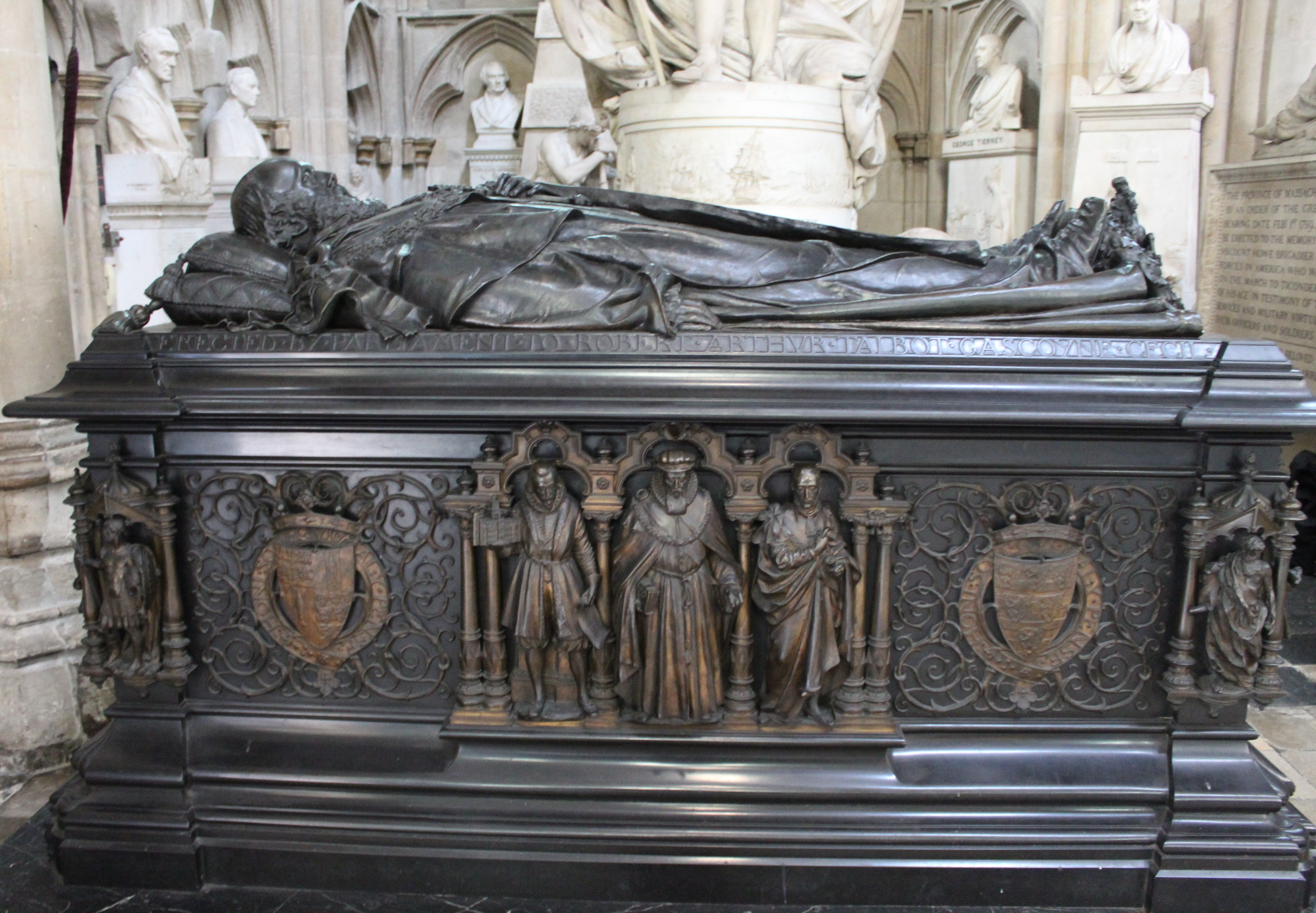
Memorial to Robert Gascoyne-Cecil, 3rd Marquess of Salisbury, near the west door

- Robert Gascoyne-Cecil, 3rd Marquess of Salisbury — buried at St Etheldreda's Church, Hatfield
- Sir John Gielgud — ashes scattered in the garden of his home in Wotton Underwood, Buckinghamshire
- Adam Lindsay Gordon — buried in Australia
- George Green — buried in Nottingham
- John Harrison — buried at St John's Church, Hampstead, London
- Philip Larkin — buried at the Cottingham Municipal Cemetery, East Riding of Yorkshire
- The Reverend Evelyn Levett Sutton, Prebendary of Westminster and Chaplain to the House of Commons (collapsed after reading the ninth commandment during Sunday services and died the next day)
- Clive Staples "C. S." Lewis — buried at Holy Trinity Church, Headington, Oxfordshire
- Jenny Lind — buried at the Great Malvern Cemetery, Worcestershire
- David Lloyd George, 1st Earl Lloyd-George of Dwyfor — buried beside the River Dwyfor in Llanystumdwy, Gwynedd
- Henry Wadsworth Longfellow — buried in the Mount Auburn Cemetery, Cambridge, Massachusetts
- George Herbert — honoured in a stained glass window unveiled by George William Childs in 1875

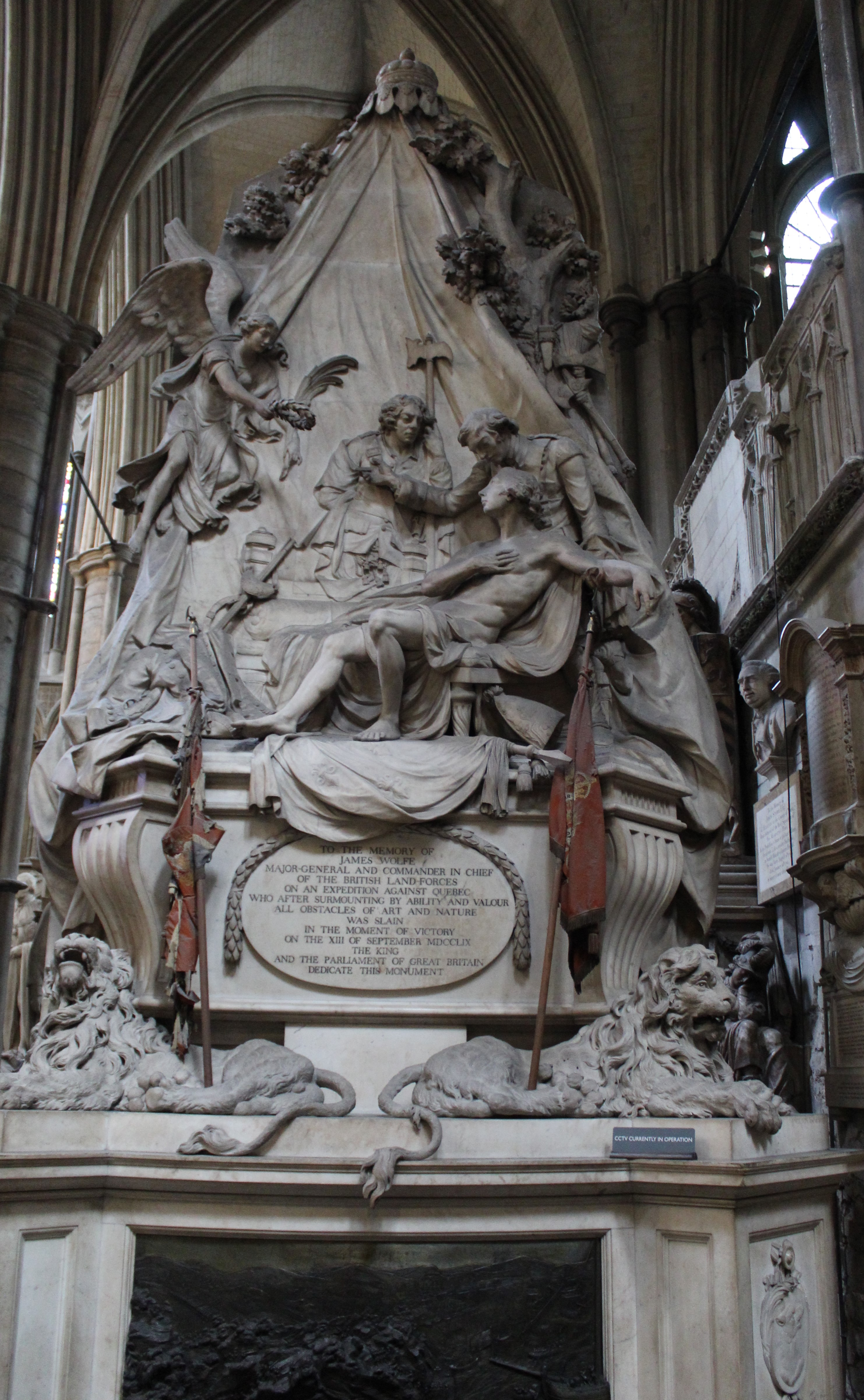
Monument to General Wolfe

- James Ramsay MacDonald — ashes buried at Holy Trinity Church, Spynie, Moray, Scotland
- John A. Macdonald — buried in Cataraqui Cemetery, Kingston, Ontario
- Sir Robert Menzies — ashes buried in the "Prime Ministers Garden" at Melbourne General Cemetery, Victoria, Australia
- Admiral of the Fleet Louis Mountbatten, 1st Earl Mountbatten of Burma — buried in Romsey Abbey, Hampshire
- Pasquale Paoli — buried at Morosaglia, Corsica
- Admiral Arthur Phillip — buried at Church of St Nicholas, Bathampton, Somerset
- Franklin D. Roosevelt — buried at Home of Franklin D. Roosevelt National Historic Site, Hyde Park, New York
- William Shakespeare — buried at Church of the Holy Trinity, Stratford-upon-Avon, Warwickshire
- Dylan Thomas — buried at St Martin's Church, Laugharne, Wales
- Rear Admiral Thomas Totty — buried at Portsmouth Garrison Chapel, Old Portsmouth, Hampshire
- Lieutenant General William Villettes — buried in Kingston, Jamaica
- William Walton — ashes buried on Ischia, Italy
- The Reverend Charles Wesley — buried at St Marylebone Parish Church, London
- The Reverend John Wesley — buried at Wesley's Chapel, London
- Oscar Wilde — honoured in a stained glass window unveiled in 1995; buried in the Père Lachaise Cemetery, Paris
- Major General James Wolfe — buried at St Alfege Church, Greenwich, London

=== First World War poets ===
Sixteen Great War poets are commemorated on a slate stone unveiled on 11 November 1985, in the south transept (Poets' Corner):

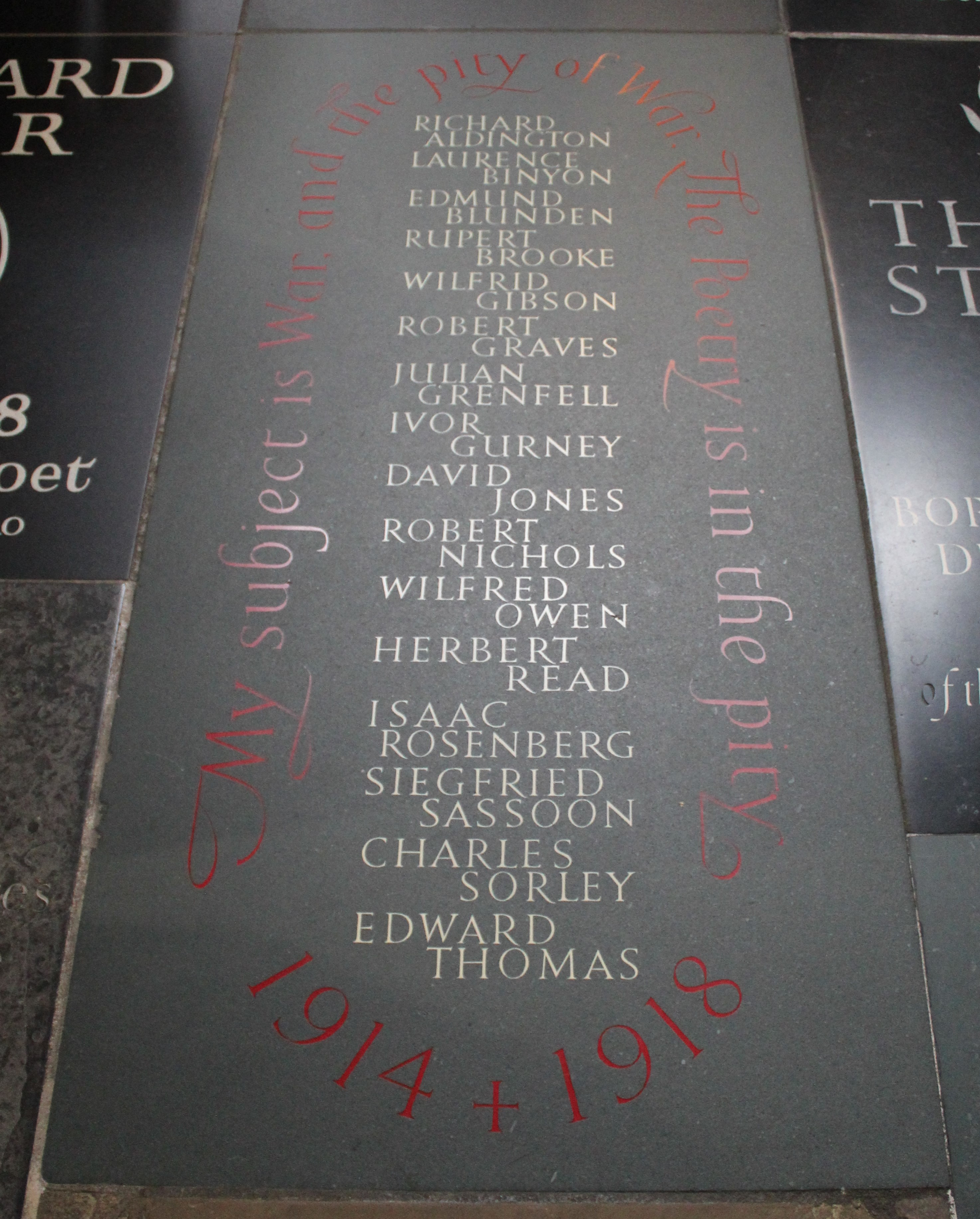
Poets of the First World War memorial floorstone

- Richard Aldington — buried in Sury, Ardennes, France
- Laurence Binyon (author of "For the Fallen") — buried in Reading, Berkshire
- Edmund Blunden — buried in Holy Trinity Church, Long Melford, Suffolk
- Rupert Brooke (author of "The Soldier") — buried in Skyros, Greece
- Wilfrid Gibson (one of the Georgian poets)
- Robert Graves (author of "I, Claudius" and the only poet of the sixteen, still alive at the time of the commemoration) — buried in Deià, Mallorca, Spain
- Captain Julian Grenfell — buried in Boulogne Eastern Cemetery, Boulogne-sur-Mer, Pas-de-Calais, France
- Ivor Gurney — buried in St Matthew's Church, Twigworth, Gloucestershire
- David Jones — buried in the Ladywell and Brockley Cemetery, Lewisham, London
- Robert Nichols — buried in St Mary's Church, Lawford, Essex
- Second Lieutenant Wilfred Owen (author of "Dulce et Decorum est" and "Anthem for Doomed Youth", and recipient of the Military Cross) — buried in the Ors Communal Cemetery, Ors, Northern France
- Sir Herbert Read — buried in Stonegrave, North Yorkshire
- Isaac Rosenberg — buried in the Bailleul Road East Cemetery, Saint-Laurent-Blangy, Pas-de-Calais, France
- Captain Siegfried Sassoon — buried at St Andrew's Church, Mells, Somerset
- Captain Charles Sorley — also commemorated at the Loos Memorial, in France
- Corporal Edward Thomas — buried in the Commonwealth War Graves Cemetery, Agny, France

=== Nurses and midwives who died in the Second World War ===
The Nurses' Chapel in the Islip Chapel of the Abbey is a memorial to the 3,076 nurses, midwives and auxiliaries of the British Commonwealth and Empire who died in the Second World War. It was opened in 1950 by Queen Elizabeth and features a Roll of Honour and a memorial stained glass window, designed by Hugh Easton.

=== 20th-century martyrs ===
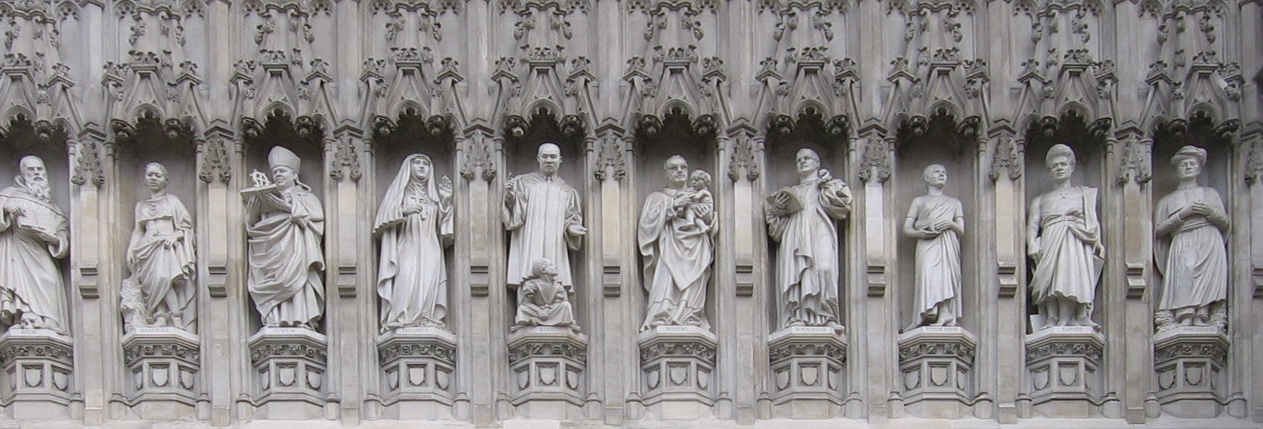
The 20th-century martyrs

Above the Great West Door, ten 20th-century Christian martyrs from across the world are depicted in statues; from left to right:

- (Poland) Maximilian Kolbe
- (South Africa) Manche Masemola
- (Uganda) Janani Luwum
- (Russia) Grand Duchess Elizabeth Feodorovna
- (United States) Martin Luther King Jr.
- (El Salvador) Óscar Romero
- (Germany) Dietrich Bonhoeffer
- (Pakistan) Esther John
- (Papua New Guinea) Lucian Tapiedi
- (China) Wang Zhiming

== Formerly buried (removed) ==
Harold I of England was originally buried in the abbey, but his body was exhumed, beheaded, and thrown into a fen, in June 1040. The body was later rescued and re-buried in the church of St Clement Danes, Westminster.

A number of Cromwellians were also buried in the abbey, but later removed, on the orders of Charles II, and (except for Oliver Cromwell, who was buried at Tyburn) buried in a pit in St Margaret's churchyard, adjoining the abbey. A modern plaque on the exterior wall of the church records the names of those who were disinterred:

- Oliver Cromwell, Lord Protector
- Admiral Robert Blake
- John Pym

Marie Joséphine of Savoy, titular Queen of France and wife of Louis XVIII of France, died in exile in England in 1810 and was buried in the Lady Chapel. In 1811, under her husband's orders, her body was exhumed and removed to Cagliari Cathedral, Sardinia.

In November 1869, at the request of the Dean of Westminster and with the approval of Queen Victoria, the philanthropist George Peabody was given a temporary burial in the abbey, but was later moved and buried in Salem, Massachusetts.

== Proposed burials and memorials ==
- Thomas Carlyle burial: Upon Carlyle's death in 1881, Arthur Penrhyn Stanley made an offer of burial in Westminster Abbey. Carlyle had anticipated and rejected this, taking issue with the Church of England's burial service as well as the spectacle of the event, saying that "Westminster Abbey would require a general gaol delivery of rogues before any man could be at peace there". In accordance with his will, he was buried with his family in Hoddam, Scotland.
- Florence Nightingale: On her death in 1910 burial was offered in the Abbey but declined as her written wishes were to be buried at Wellow, Hampshire. The Nurses' Memorial Chapel, in the upper Islip chantry chapel, was re-dedicated to Florence Nightingale, on the centenary of her death.
- Richard III burial: After the discovery of Richard III's remains in September 2012, a controversy arose as to whether or not he should be interred at Westminster Abbey or some other suitable location. His remains were ultimately buried in Leicester Cathedral.
- Captain Sir Thomas "Tom" Moore memorial: Following his death in February 2021, TV presenter Carol Vorderman suggested Moore should have a memorial stone placed in Westminster Abbey, in recognition of his fundraising efforts in the run up to his 100th birthday during the COVID-19 pandemic.
