= William Matthew =

William Matthew may refer to:

- William Diller Matthew (1871–1930), vertebrate paleontologist
- William Matthew (equestrian) (born 1993), Australian equestrian

== See also ==
- William Matthews (disambiguation)
