= David Benton =

David Benton may refer to:

- Dave Benton (born 1951), Aruban-born Estonian pop musician
- David Charles Benton (born 1957), British nurse and regulatory and health policy expert
