= William Mathews =

William Mathews may refer to:

- William Mathews (cricketer) (1793–1858), English cricketer
- William A. Mathews (1800–1856), Texas colonist, soldier, courier and quartermaster in the Texas Revolution
- William Mathews (mountaineer) (1828–1901), English mountaineer and botanist
- William Gordon Mathews (1877–1923), federal judge and lawyer in West Virginia
- William Shirley Mathews (1848–1915, Osage Nation politician
- Bill Mathews (William Henry Mathews, 1919–2003), Canadian geologist

== See also ==
- William Matthews (disambiguation)
