= Byrd Lockhart =

American surveyor, Alamo defender, courier and Texian officer

Byrd Lockhart (1782–1839), was a 19th-century American surveyor, Alamo defender, courier, and Texian officer during the Texas Revolution.

== Early life and family ==
Lockhart was born in Virginia in 1782. At age 32, Byrd Lockhart was known to be a surveyor in Madison County, Illinois. He moved to Texas from Missouri with his mother, sister, and two children. He was already a widower when he settled in Green DeWitt's colony on March 20, 1826.

== Career in Texas ==
Lockhart was appointed deputy surveyor to James Kerr on December 12, 1826, and surveyed the lands of DeWitt Colony around Gonzales. In January, he headed a meeting denouncing the Fredonian Rebellion and pledging loyalty to the Mexican government. In April, he was put in charge of defense in Gonzales, using a row of blockhouses that served as protection against Indians. Later in 1827, he pioneered construction of roads from Bexar to Gonzales and from the Lavaca River right bank to the Matagorda Bay. In 1830, he was paid four leagues of land on Plum Creek for his construction work. In April 1831, he was appointed official surveyor to DeWitt's colony by José Antonio Navarro. During this time, Land Commissioner Navarro and he laid out the official plans for the town of Gonzales. Byrd Lockhart became the municipal surveyor of District Three in September.

== Texas Revolution ==
In late 1835, he joined with Commander Stephen F. Austin's forces in San Antonio and served with James W. Fannin as a scout. Private Lockhart recruited his son, Byrd Lockhart, Jr. and they participated in the siege of Bexar in Captain John York's company. On the following January 17, Colonel James C. Neill, José Francisco Ruiz, and John William Smith, along with Lockhart, were selected as commissioners by James W. Robinson to parley with the hostile Comanche Indians, who were endangering Bexar.

Lockhart was named along with Mathew Caldwell and William A. Mathews as commissioners to raise a group of volunteers in Gonzales for a ranging company on February 4. Though serving at Bexar, Andrew Jackson Sowell and he were sent from the Alamo a short time before the battle to obtain supplies for the garrison. They were delayed foraging livestock and supplies and were blocked by Mexican troops upon their return. They promptly headed for Gonzales, and on February 23, the Gonzales Ranging Company of Mounted Volunteers was mustered into service by Lockhart. Lockhart, Sowell, and others rode back with the 32 rangers, into the Alamo, on the morning of March 1, and later departed again, at night, as other couriers left.

Lockhart later served the Texan army as the captain of a spy company. He died in 1839.

== Legacy ==
The town of Lockhart, Texas is named in his honor.

== Citations ==
- Groneman, Bill (1990), Alamo Defenders: A Genealogy, the People and Their Words, Austin, TX: Eakin Press, ISBN 978-0-89015-757-2
- Lindley, Thomas Ricks (2003), Alamo Traces: New Evidence and New Conclusions, Lanham, MD: Republic of Texas Press, ISBN 1-55622-983-6
