= Mary Watkins, Baroness Watkins of Tavistock =

English professor and politician (born 1955)

The Right Honourable The Baroness Watkins of Tavistock FRCN
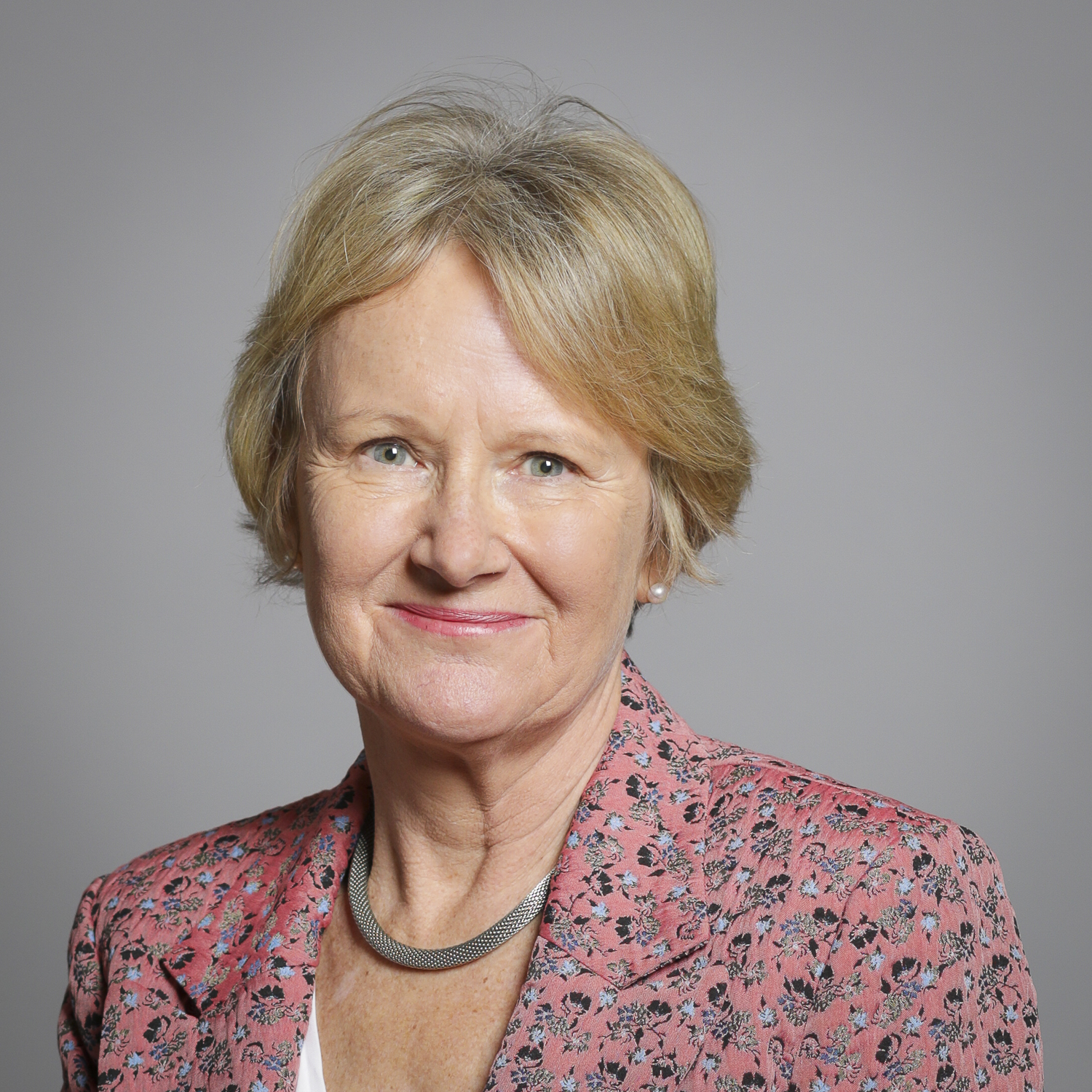

Member of the House of Lords
- Lord Temporal
- Life peerage 2 November 2015

Personal details
- Born: Mary Jane Watkins; 5 March 1955 (age 71)
- Party: Crossbench

Mary Jane Watkins, Baroness Watkins of Tavistock, FRCN (born 5 March 1955), is a British Professor of Nursing. She currently is emeritus professor of healthcare leadership at Plymouth University and Deputy Vice Chancellor of the university.

== Career ==
She trained at the Wolfson School of Nursing, Westminster Hospital (RGN, 1976), and at South London and Maudsley Nursing School (RMN, 1979). She was awarded a Florence Nightingale Foundation Scholarship, and obtained her PhD from King's College London in 1985.

== Peerage and honours ==
She was nominated for life peerage by the House of Lords Appointments Commission, and was created Baroness Watkins of Tavistock, of Buckland Monachorum in the County of Devon, on 2 November 2015. She sits in the House of Lords as a crossbencher.

In 2019 she was made a Fellow of the Royal College of Nursing. She served as co-chair of the 2020 World Health Organization's review of the State of the World Nursing, as co-chair of the Burdett Trust's Nursing Now initiative, and for seven years was President of the Florence Nightingale Foundation.
