= David Charles Benton =

British nurse and regulatory and health policy expert

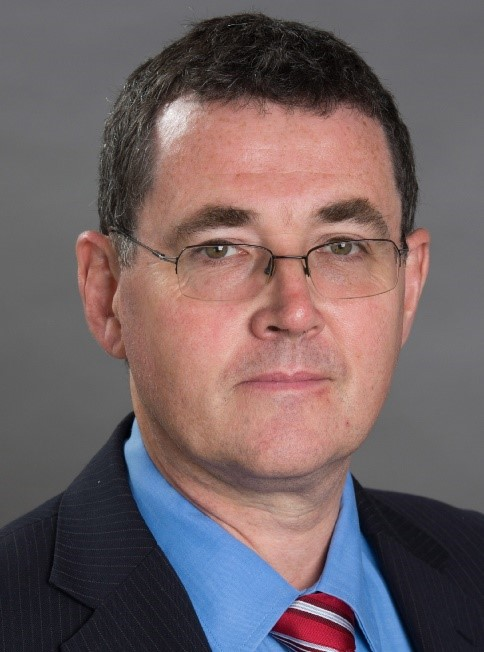
- Born: 29 October 1957 (age 68); Torphins, Aberdeenshire, Scotland, UK
- Citizenship: British
- Known for: Nursing and Health Policy
- Spouse: Elizabeth Denise Benton (née Macrae)

Academic background
- Education: Robert Gordon University; University of Stirling; Abertay University; Complutense University of Madrid

Academic work
- Discipline: Nursing
- Institutions: National Council of State Boards of Nursing
- Website: www.inrc.com/ncsbn.htm

David Charles Benton PhD, RGN, FRCN, FAAN, (born 29 October 1957) is a British nurse and regulatory and health policy expert who is the 5th Chief Executive Officer of the National Council of State Boards of Nursing (NCSBN) based in Chicago, Illinois, USA. Benton was previously Chief Executive Officer of the International Council of Nurses in Geneva, Switzerland. Benton publishes on nursing and health policy, leadership, occupational licensure and nurse regulatory models, workforce and migration, and research methods, including the use of social network analysis, and bibliometric analysis.

== Education ==
Benton is a Registered Nurse who qualified in both general nursing (1983) and mental health nursing (1984) at the Highland College of Nursing and Midwifery in Inverness which later became part of the University of Stirling. He was educated at Elgin East End School and Elgin Academy, Moray and holds a BSc in Electronic and Electrical Engineering (1978) from Robert Gordon Institute of Technology (now Robert Gordon University), an MPhil (1988) from Abertay University and an MSc and PhD (2013) from Complutense University of Madrid.

== Professional life ==
Benton started his nursing career working clinically in general medicine and then in acute psychiatric nursing in Inverness before moving to a specialist post as district research nurse in 1988 at the then North East Essex Health Authority.

He then worked as the chief nurse and director of quality for the then Tower Hamlets Health Authority in London in 1990, regional nurse director for the Northern and Yorkshire Regional Health Authority, chief executive officer The National Board for Nursing, Midwifery and Health Visiting for Scotland (now NHS Education for Scotland) in 1998, during which time he represented all four of the national boards on the group reviewing the future of the UK nursing regulatory model which ultimately resulted in the creation of the Nursing and Midwifery Council.

Benton became director of nursing of the then NHS Grampian Acute Hospitals Trust (2001) before moving to work for the International Council of Nurses (2005). He served as a special advisor to the Scottish Parliament's workforce committee and served as a member of the then Health Minister's committee for nursing on "Facing the Future". Benton was elected chair of the Scottish Nurse Directors group from 2003 to 2005. Benton became chief executive officer of the International Council of Nurses in 2008 before assuming his present position as 5th chief executive officer of the National Council of State Boards of Nursing (NCSBN) in 2015.

== Awards and recognition ==
Benton is a Fellow of the Florence Nightingale Foundation (2001) a Fellow of the Royal College of Nursing (2003) and a Fellow of the American Academy of Nursing (2007). He was a recipient of the inaugural Nursing Standard Leadership award (1993) and the Nuffield Traveling Fellowship for Research and Policy Studies in Health services (1999). In 2017, he received the Spanish Grand Nursing Cross: Gold Category, the highest award for nursing in relation to work on health policy and nursing regulation.

== Personal life ==
Benton is married to Elizabeth Denise Benton (née Macrae) and they have three children.

== Bibliography ==
Benton's publications are listed on Web of Science. His three most-cited articles are:

- Campbell, J; Cometto, G; Rasanathan, K; Kelley, E; Syed, S; Zurn, P; de Bernis, L; Matthews, Z; Benton, D; Nove, A (2015). "Improving the resilience and workforce of health systems for women's, children's, and adolescents' health". The BMJ. 39 h4148. doi:10.1136/bmj.h4148. PMID 26371216.
- Benton, DC; Perez-Raya, F; Fernandez-Fernandez, MP; Gonzalez-Jurado, MA (2015). "A systematic review of nurse-related social network analysis studies". International Nursing Review. 62 (3): 321–339. doi:10.1111/inr.12161. PMID 25496051.
- Rao, M; Wilkinson, J; Benton, D (1991). "Screening for undescended testes". Archives of Disease in Childhood. 41 (2): 119–128. doi:10.1136/adc.66.8.934. PMC 1793430. PMID 1681788.
