= Elizabeth Greenhill (bookbinder) =

English bookbinder (1907–2006)

- Born: Christine Elizabeth Florence Greenhill; 4 May 1907; Paris, France
- Died: 30 December 2006 (aged 99); London, England
- Education: Bedales School; Sacred Hart Convent; Central School of Arts and Crafts
- Occupation: Bookbinder
- Years active: 1927–1984

Christine Elizabeth Florence Greenhill (4 May 1907 – 30 December 2006) was an English bookbinder. She did bookbinding following her encouragement from her sister to enrol on bookbinding classes until the Second World War broke out when she became a full-time air raid warden and thus had little time to do bookbinding. Greenhill returned to bookbinding soon after the war was over and served as honorary secretary of the Guild of Contemporary Bookbinders before being elected its president for a single term. The Bodleian Library has held two collections of boxes relating to her life and career in its Libraries Repository since 2009.

== Early life and education ==
She was born Christine Elizabeth Florence Greenhill into a wealthy family visiting Paris on 4 May 1907. Greenhill was the daughter of the hoteliers Charles Greenhill and Florence Roach. Her paternal grandfather was the German hotelier Karl Grunhold. Greenhill had an elder sister who went on to become a painter and an older brother. As what happened with other families of the time, the family changed their surname to Greenhill during the First World War.

She had little experience in school; Greenhill was first educated at Bedales School in Hampshire and first gained experience in using materials inside the workshop of the bookbinder O.S Powell. She went on to spend a few months at a boarding school in Florence in Italy. Greenhill learnt bookbinding and calligraphy at Roehampton's Sacred Heart Convent (today the Digby Stuart College). She subsequently took bookbinding classes under the French designer binder Pierre Legrain at Ecole des Arts Décoratifs pour Dames in Paris between 1925 and 1927 following encouragement from her sister to matriculate to the school.

== Career ==
Greenhill went back to London in 1927. She matriculated to the Central School of Arts and Crafts and studied bookbinding, calligraphy, drawing and design under Douglas Cockerell and Peter McLeish. She took evening classes under William Matthews and learnt to repair and re-back books as well as how to cut tools. For a brief period, Greenhill resided in the home of her uncle in Bloomsbury and set up a small bindery in his attic. There, she undertook run-of-the-mill binding and did repairs and also undertook major concessions such as the Gloucester Civic Bible produced for George V's and Mary of Teck's Silver Jubilee in 1935. Greenhill's early customers included Hilaire Belloc and Walter de la Mare.

In 1937, she established a workshop in Essex Street and was sent trade-bookbinding people to assist in finishing and forwarding. Following the outbreak of the Second World War, Greenhill had little time to do bookbinding because she had become a full-time air raid warden. She moved to Norfolk to convalesce from ill health in 1944 and went back to London in the following year. When the war was over, Greenhill returned to full-time bookbinding. She established a bindery in the family home in South Kensington. Greenhill bound for the collector J.R. Abbey and worked to restore Chevening libraries. She began giving private lessons in 1950 and encouraged young people by awarding an annual award for gold-tooling in sponsored competitions. Greenhill was the first women to be elected to the Guild of Contemporary Bookbinders (now called Designer Bookbinders) in 1961.

When the River Arno flooded in 1966, she flew to Florence twice to assist the British squad in a large, desolate hall at the Biblioteca Nazionale to repair thousands of books damaged by mud and water left from the floodwaters. Greenhill served as honorary secretary of the Guild of Contemporary Bookbinders from 1967 to 1974 before she was elected to a single term as the guild's first women president in 1975 and remained president until 1978. She held Guild meetings in her drawing room and was appointed an honorary Fellow of Designer Bookbinders in 1985. The following year, K.D. Duval published the catalogue raisonne of her work Elizabeth Greenhill Bookbinder. Greenhill retired from bookbindery in 1984 due to deteriorating eyesight.

== Death ==
On 30 December 2006, Greenhill died in a London nursing home at age 99. She was unmarried.

== Approach and legacy ==
Greenhill made more than 100 bindings in the colours of blue, green, mauve and purple. The Bodleian Library has held two collections of boxes relating to her life and career in its Libraries Repository since 2009. They include her works, personal correspondence and materials from 1935 to 1983.
