= William Matthews =

William, Bill, or Billy Matthews may refer to:

== Politics ==
- William Matthews (politician) (1755–1808), American politician in Maryland
- William D. Matthews (politician) (1846–1930), American politician in Oklahoma
- Donald Ray Matthews (1907–1997), known as Billy, American congressman
- Bill Matthews (born 1947), Canadian politician

== Sports ==
- Bill Matthews (footballer) (1876–1923), Australian footballer for St Kilda
- William Clarence Matthews (1877–1928), American baseball infielder and lawyer
- William Matthews (baseball) (1878–1946), American baseball pitcher
- Billy Matthews (footballer, born 1882) (1882–1916), English footballer
- Billy Matthews (footballer, born 1883) (1883–1921), Welsh footballer
- William Howard Matthews (1885–1963), English footballer
- Billy Matthews (footballer, born 1897) (1897–1987), Welsh footballer

== Other people ==
- William Matthews (priest) (1770–1854), American Catholic priest and President of Georgetown College
- William D. Matthews (1827–1906), African American abolitionist, Civil War Union officer and Freemason
- William Matthews (engineer) (1844–1922), British civil engineer
- William E. Matthews (1845–1894), lawyer, financier, and civil rights activist
- William Matthews (poet) (1942–1997), American poet and essayist
- William Matthews (fl. 1970–1983), co-editor of the diary of Samuel Pepys
- William Matthews (musician) (born 1983), American musician
- William Matthews (bookbinder) (1822–1896), American bookbinder

== See also ==
- Billie Matthews (1930–2001), American football coach
- Will Matthews (disambiguation)
- William Mathews (disambiguation)
