= Will Matthews =

Will Matthews may refer to:

- Will Matthews (rugby union) (born 1985), rugby union player
- Will Matthews (rugby league) (born 1988), rugby league player for the Gold Coast Titans
- Will Matthews (American football), American football player, see 2006 Detroit Lions season

== See also ==
- William Matthews (disambiguation)
