= The Nurses' Chapel =

Memorial chapel in Westminster Abbey

The Nurses' Chapel is a memorial chapel in Westminster Abbey to all the 3,076 nurses of the British Commonwealth and Empire who died during the Second World War. The chapel was re-dedicated to Florence Nightingale in 2010 on the centenary of her death.

== History ==
The British Empire Nurses' Memorial Fund was launched in 1946 to furnish a memorial chapel in Westminster Abbey and hold a roll of honour of the names of the dead. It was later renamed the British Commonwealth and Empire Nurses Memorial fund. Queen Elizabeth was the patron of the fund. The members of the Council for the Memorial Fund included the Duchess of Northumberland (President), Dame Emily Blair, Dame Katherine Watt, Lord Moran and Sir Alfred Webb-Johnson. The second objective of the Memorial Fund was to use any surplus monies donated to provide post-graduate travelling scholarships for nurses and midwives.

The chapel, in the upper Islip Chapel, was opened in 1950 by Queen Elizabeth, who also unveiled a stained glass window honouring the nurses, midwives and auxiliaries. The ceremony was attended by amongst others, the then Princess Royal, the Prime Minister Clement Attlee, the Minister for Health Aneurin Bevan and the High Commissioners for India, South Africa, Australia and New Zealand. At the time of opening, the chapel was believed to be the only memorial chapel in the world dedicated to nurses and midwives.

== Roll of honour ==
The Roll of Honour, which lists the names of the 3,076 nurses, midwives and auxiliaries who died in the Second World War, is kept in within a bronze casket. The casket is flanked by two bronze candlesticks which were gifts from the Queen. The Roll was bound in blue leather, tooled in gold by Elizabeth Greenhill and lettered in black with blue capitals by Constance Free. In 1980 a brass strip was added to the casket in memory of Miss Elise Gordon who was the editor of the Nursing Mirror which paid the administration costs of the Memorial Fund. In the annual Florence Nightingale Commemoration Service, the 1939–1945 Roll of Honour, together with two other Rolls of Honour for the nurses and midwives who died in the First World War and the COVID-19 pandemic, is carried through the Abbey.

== Features ==
The chapel was designed by Sebastian Comper, son of Sir Ninian Comper. The memorial stained glass window was designed by Hugh Ray Easton and features a nurse kneeling amongst all the coats of arms of the countries from which nurses served.

The chapel also houses the lamp used in the annual Florence Nightingale Commemoration Service which is held on the anniversary of her birth, now International Nurses Day. The lamp was purchased and inscribed in memory of Mrs Kathleen Dampier-Bennett, a committee member of the Florence Nightingale Foundation from 1951 to 1968.
