= William A. Mathews =

William A. Mathews (1800–1856) was a 19th-century American-born Texas colonist, soldier, courier and quartermaster in the Texas Revolution.

== Early life and family ==
Mathews sometimes spelled Matthews, was born in Vermont, United States in 1800. At the age of seventeen, he would join with Green DeWitt at Missouri. In 1824, he would assist DeWitt when traveling to Texas, bringing in families and settling near Gonzales, Texas. Mathews married Naomi Dewitt, a daughter of Green DeWitt and they had one son. Mathews became a prominent citizen of Gonzales, rendering aid to all settlers of the colony. His wife died early and in 1838 he married Nancy King, a daughter of John G. King. They had two children.

== Career in Texas ==
Mathews would aid in the colonization of the DeWitt Colony. He would contract with DeWitt, who was encountering difficulties filling his obligations with the Mexican government in bringing 400 families to Texas. Mathews was contracted to bring 20 families into the DeWitt Colony from Tennessee. Mathews would guide the group to Texas, seeing to procure their supplies and other needs. Once entering Texas he would assure that they would receive their land grants. He acquired much land for himself, thus becoming a farmer and cattle rancher of the region.

== Texas Revolution ==
On February 4, 1836, William A. Mathews was named along with Mathew Caldwell and Byrd Lockhart as commissioners to raise a group of volunteers in Gonzales for a ranging company. On February 23, a 23 member Gonzales Ranging Company of Mounted Volunteers were mustered into service. During the Texas Revolution, he would participate as a volunteer soldier, courier and quartermaster.

In 1837-1838, he would serve with Byrd Lockhart's company, as a scout for the Republic.

William A. Matthews died in 1856 and was buried on the east side of the Masonic cemetery in Gonzales.

== Legacy ==
In 1962, a historical grave marker was placed in the Gonzales Masonic Cemetery, honoring his service to Texas.

== See also ==
- Battle of Bexar 1835
- List of Alamo defenders
- Battle of the Alamo

== Sources ==
- Edmondson, J.R. (2000). The Alamo Story-From History to Current Conflicts. Plano, TX: Republic of Texas Press. ISBN 1-55622-678-0.
- Groneman, Bill (1990). Alamo Defenders: A Genealogy, the People and Their Words. Austin, TX: Eakin Press. ISBN 978-0-89015-757-2.
- Johnson, Frank White (August 29, 2010). A history of Texas and Texans, Volume 3 (reprint). Austin, TX: Nabu Press. ISBN 1-177-95059-6.
- Lindley, Thomas Ricks (2003). Alamo Traces: New Evidence and New Conclusions. Lanham, MD: Republic of Texas Press. ISBN 1-55622-983-6.
- Todish, Timothy J.; Todish, Terry; Spring, Ted (1998). Alamo Sourcebook, 1836: A Comprehensive Guide to the Battle of the Alamo and the Texas Revolution. Austin, TX: Eakin Press. ISBN 978-1-57168-152-2.
