= Florence Nightingale Foundation =

UK charitable organization

- Abbreviation: FNF
- Formation: 1934
- Legal status: Charity registration: No. 229229 England & Wales, SC044341 Scotland Company limited by guarantee registration: No. 518623 England
- Location: Deans Mews, 11-13 Cavendish Square, London W1G 0AN
- Region served: United Kingdom
- President: Mary Watkins, Baroness Watkins of Tavistock
- Chair: Dame Yvonne Moores
- Royal Patron: Princess Alexandra, The Hon. Lady Ogilvy
- Chief Executive: Professor Greta Westwood
- Website: http://florence-nightingale-foundation.org.uk/

The Florence Nightingale Foundation (FNF) is a charity organization in the United Kingdom that provides scholarships to nurses, midwives, and other health professionals. The foundation was named after, and inspired by the work of, Florence Nightingale.

== History ==
In 1912, a memorial to Florence Nightingale was first proposed by Ethel Bedford-Fenwick at an International Council of Nurses Congress in Cologne. The intent was to create a foundation to provide educational support for nurses.

The memorial proposal was activated at the ICN Grand Council in Montreal, delayed to 1929 due to the First World War. In 1931, the Florence Nightingale Memorial Committee proposed that the Memorial Foundation should focus on the post-graduate education of nurses. In 1934, the Florence Nightingale Foundation was established as an independent foundation based upon the principles of the Memorial Committee and the Florence Nightingale International Foundation. The Florence Nightingale Foundation now provides scholarships to post-graduate nurses, midwives, and other health professionals in the United Kingdom. In 2022, the University of Derby became the first higher education institution to join the foundation academy.

== Scholarships ==
The Foundation has three categories of scholarships:

- Travel scholarships are designed to enable a scholar to undertake the study of an aspect of practice and/or education in the UK or overseas.
- Research scholarships are provided to allow Nurses and Midwives to undertake a course in research methods, research modules, or a dissertation/thesis as part of an academic course of study.
- Leadership scholarships are for experienced Nurses and Midwives, Healthcare Deans, and Heads of Allied Health Professions.

== Events and activities ==
The Florence Nightingale Foundation hosts several events throughout the years.

=== Florence Nightingale Foundation Nightingale 2020 Conference ===
Florence Nightingale Foundation, Burdett Trust and Dods partnered to organize the Nightingale2020 Conference to mark the 200th birthday of Florence Nightingale. The conference took place on 27–28 October 2020, at ExCeL London.

=== Florence Nightingale Commemoration Service – Westminster Abbey ===
A Commemoration Service is held on 12 May of each year, Florence Nightingale's birth date and now also International Nurses Day. During the service, nurses carry a lamp and three Rolls of Honour from the Nurses' Chapel. The Rolls of Honour are in memory of the nurses and midwives who died in the First World War, the Second World War and the COVID-19 pandemic.

Students' Day is an annual event in which students from each university in the UK with a School of Nursing and Midwifery, are invited to spend the day at the Foundation in London. The main venue for the day is The Governors Hall at St Thomas’ Hospital.

=== Presentation of certificates ===
The Florence Nightingale Foundation Presentation of Certificates is held bi-annually and acts as the graduation ceremony for completed scholars.

In 2014, the Foundation’s patron Sir Robert Francis, was the keynote speaker and described Florence Nightingale scholars as the ‘future leaders of the profession’.

=== Alumni Community ===
In 2019, Florence Nightingale Foundation launched the Alumni Community.
