= St John the Baptist chapel =

All Saints Chapel
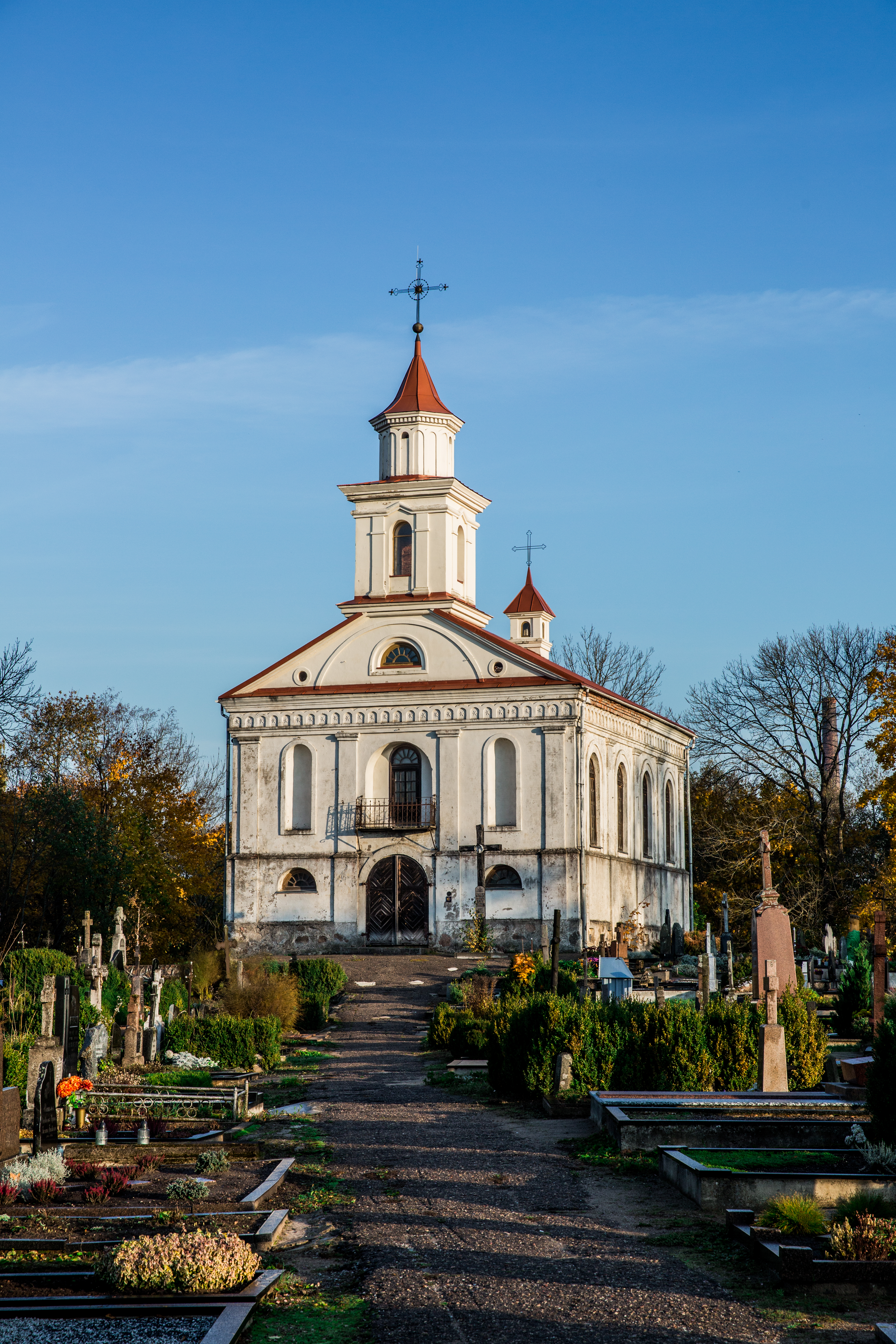
- Interactive map of the All Saints Chapel area

General information
- Location: Plungė, Lithuania
- Coordinates: 55.915507°N 21.829324°E

St John the Baptist chapel, also called the All Saints Chapel (Lithuanian: Visų Šventųjų koplyčia) or the Zubov Chapel, is a chapel built in the Romantic Classical style located in the old graveyard of Plungė City, Lithuania. It is said that it was built by local craftsmen, funded by one of the Zubov counts and the parishioners. In the chapel, members of the Zubov family are buried, as well as the families of other noblemen from the surrounding areas – Lešcevski, Vaitkevičius and Moikovskis.

== Architecture ==
The chapel is associated with both the Romantic and Historic architectural styles. Chapels that were designed for vigils and burials became popular in Lithuania during the Romantic period. The chapel has a long rectangular shape with a lowered semi-circle apse, as a single continuous space, with a tower in the southern part facing the gate to the graveyard. The size of the chapel is 20.6 x 12.4 m, with a height of 12 m (23.8 m including the tower). The building includes a rare feature: a tower, which was an unusual element in chapel architecture.

== History ==
The last religious ceremony was held there in 1934. During the Soviet era, the chapel was unattended and unprotected. The cellar was torn down, and the remains were desecrated. At present, the chapel has been partially renovated and mass sometimes takes place in the building. In 1997, the chapel was added to the cultural heritage list.

== Gallery ==
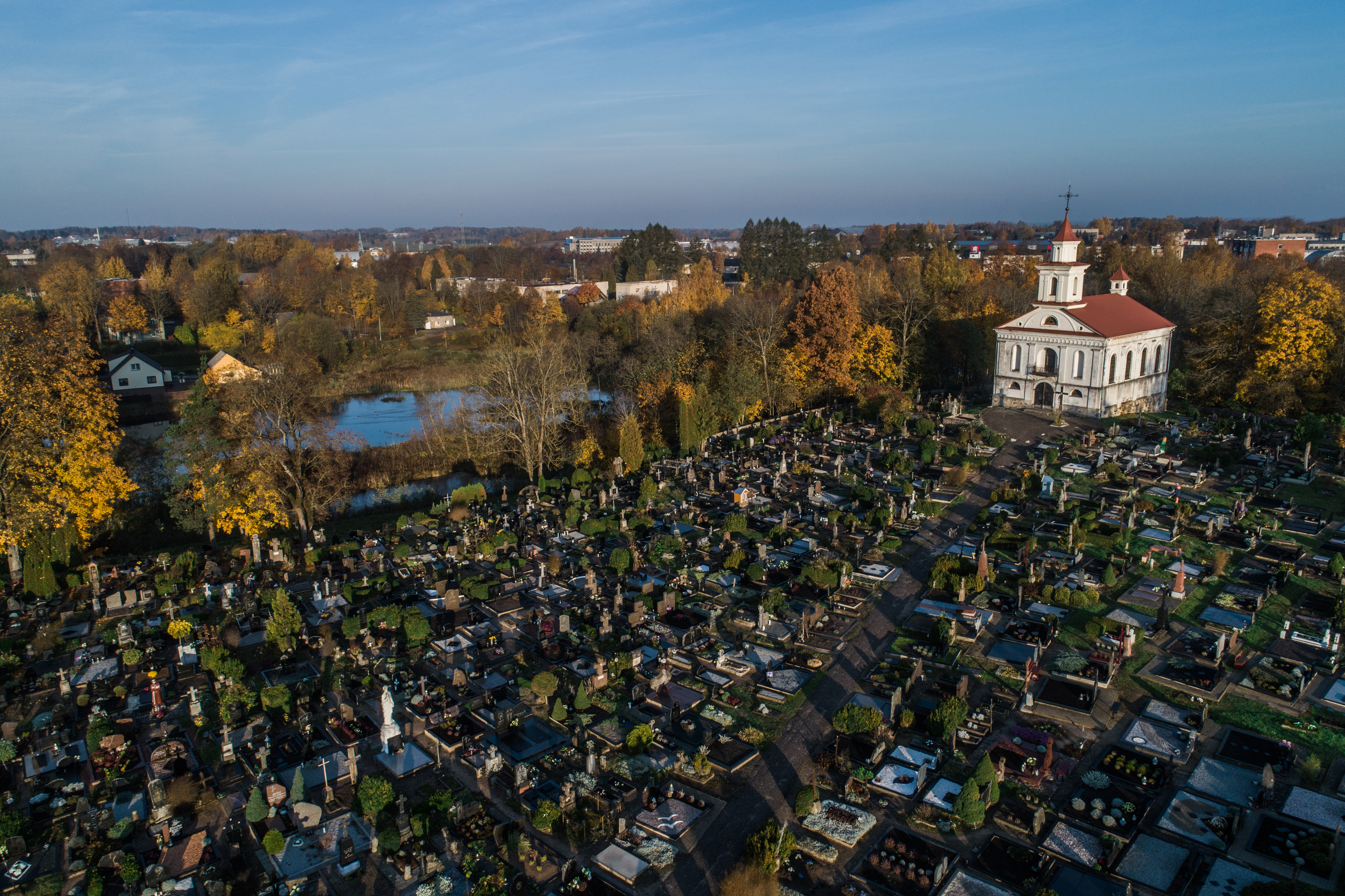

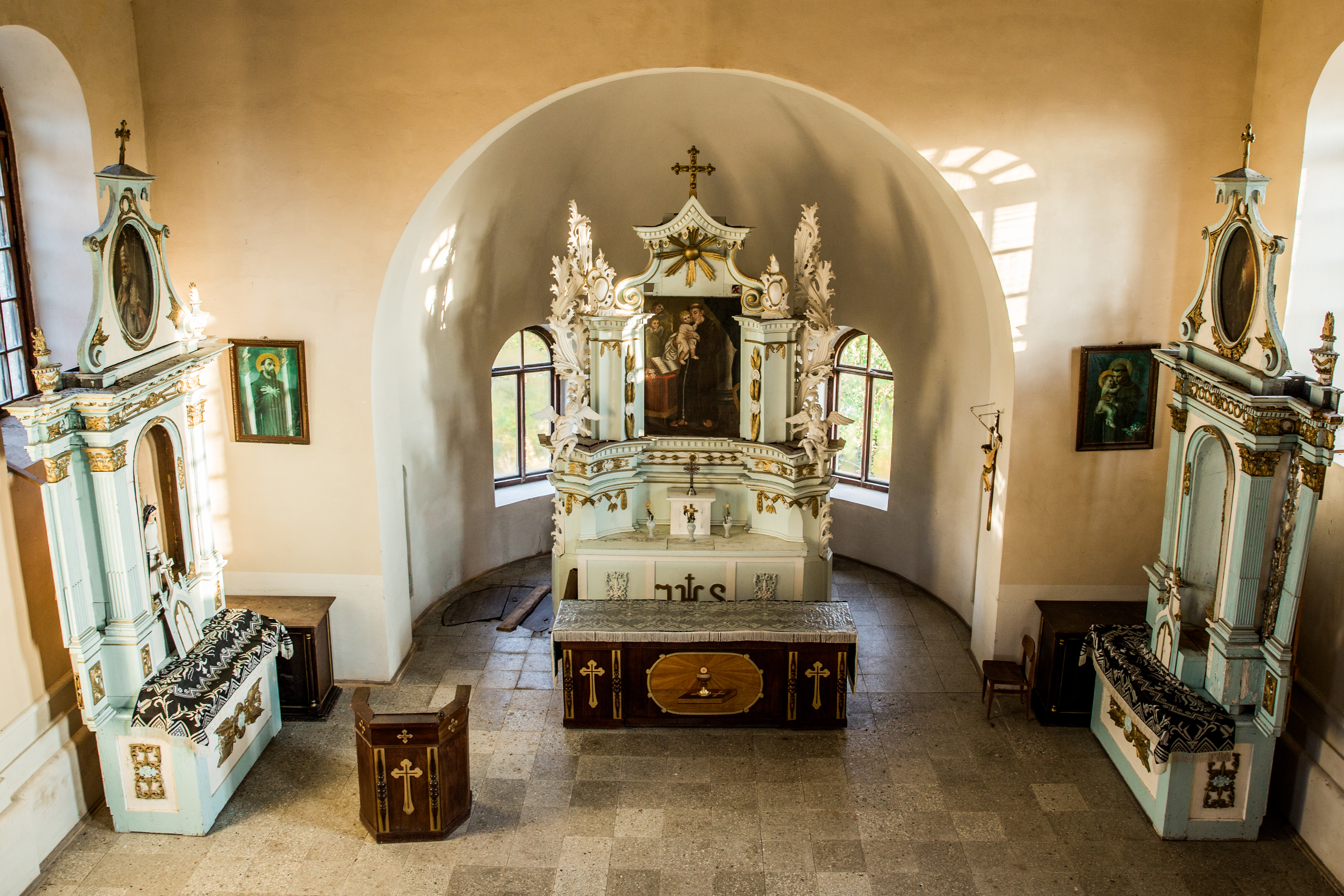

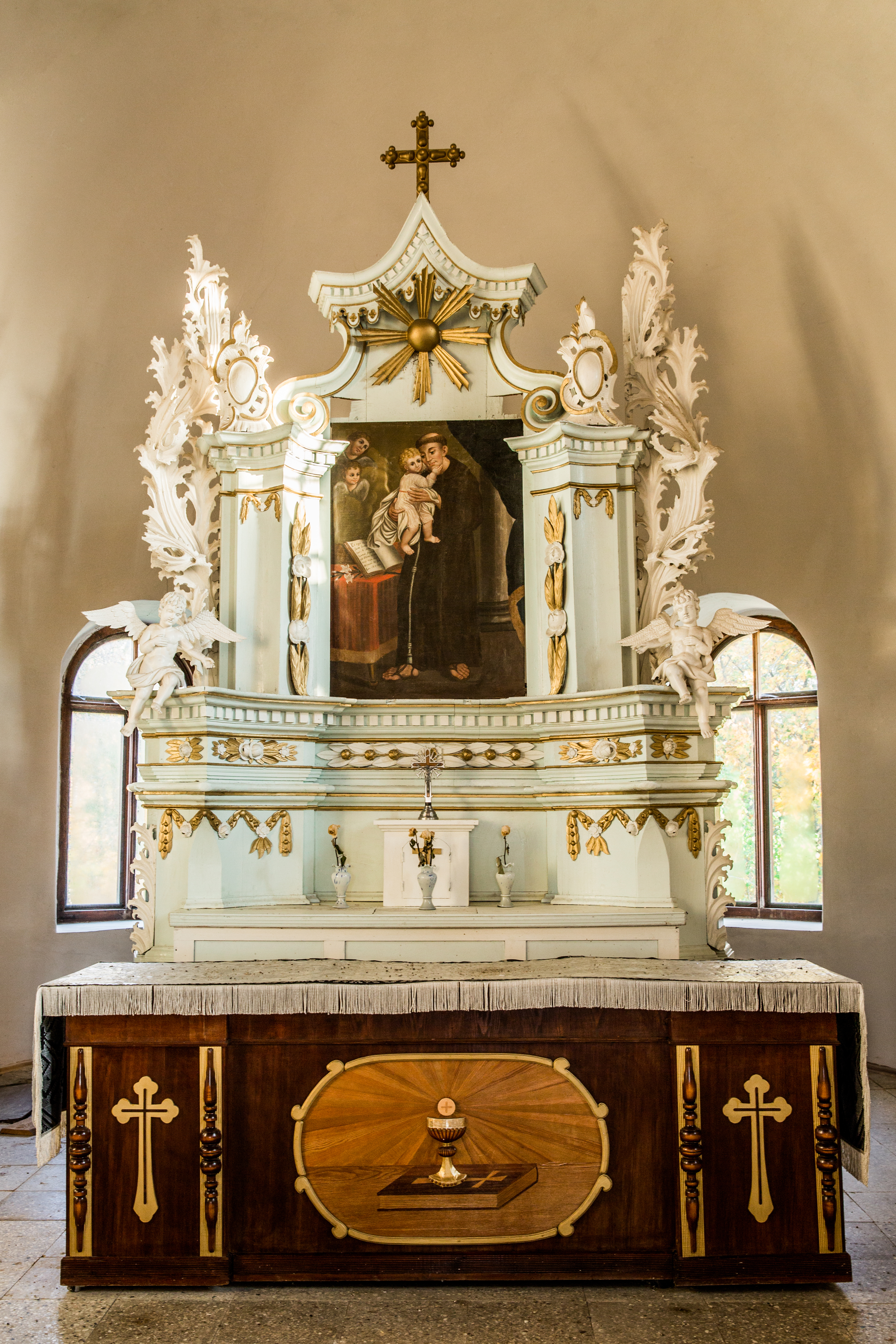

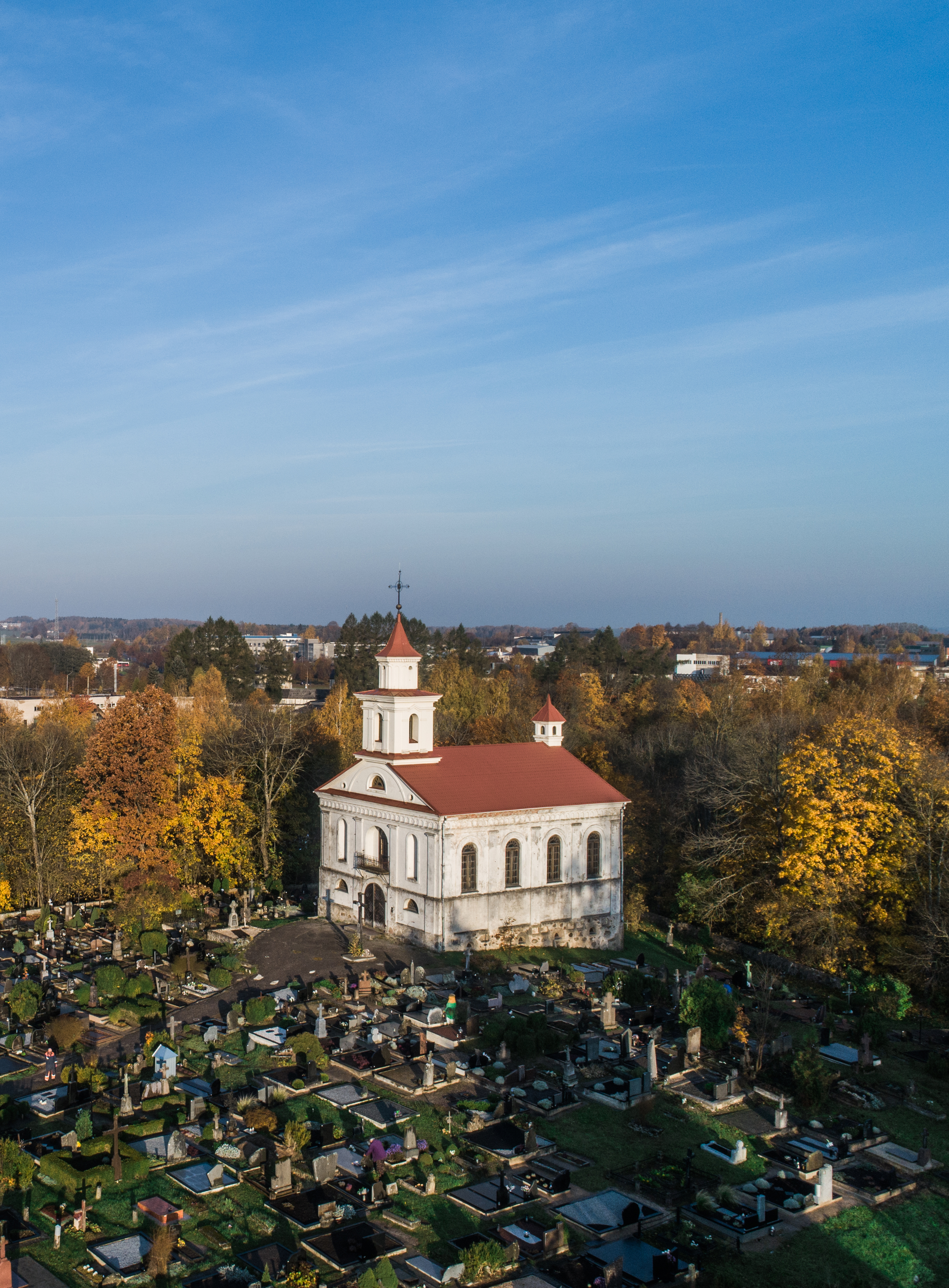

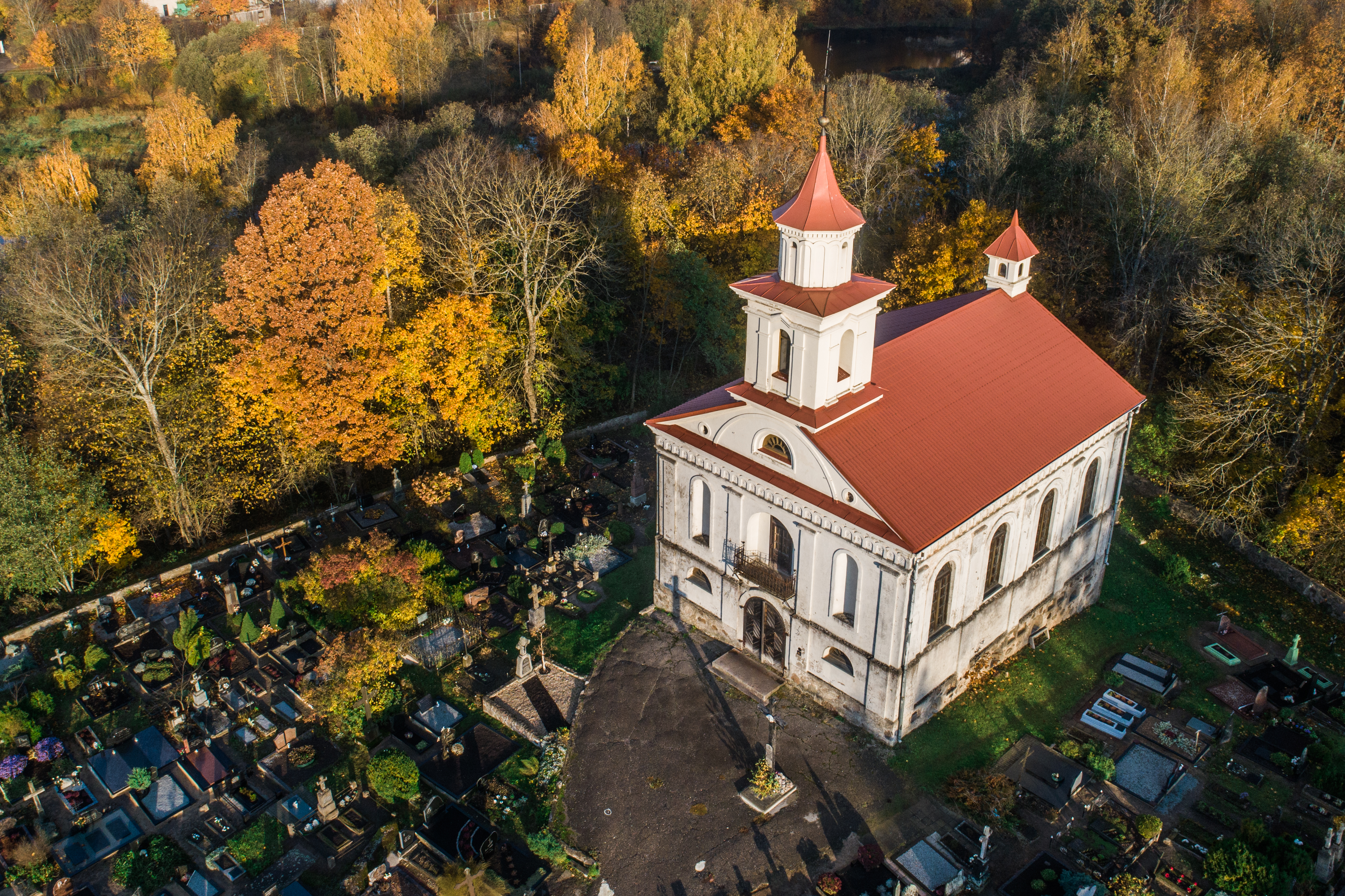
