= William Bell (theologian) =

Church of England clergyman and benefactor (1731–1816)

- Born: 1731; Greenwich, Kent, England
- Died: 29 September 1816 (aged 84–85); Westminster, Middlesex, England
- Education: Magdalene College, Cambridge
- Occupations: Church of England minister; theologian; writer; benefactor

William Bell (1731 – 29 September 1816) was a Church of England minister who engaged with vigour in some of the theological controversies of his day. He is remembered as a writer on theological matters and as a benefactor of Cambridge University and of other causes.

== Life ==
William Bell was born in Greenwich, a town growing in prosperity and importance due to the expansion in size and professionalism of the British Royal Navy during the early eighteenth century. His father was also called William Bell. The son was educated at a private classical school, Greenwich School and then, on 29 May 1749, commenced his university-level studies at Magdalene College, Cambridge.

Bell received his BA degree in 1753, with marks that placed him eighth on the university examination results list, and he was elected a fellow of Magdalene College the same year. Cambridge at this time was still included in the Diocese of Lincoln, and it was at Lincoln that on 27 September 1754 Bell was ordained a deacon, becoming a full Church of England minister the next year, on 21 December 1755. He received his MA in 1756. His master's thesis – entitled A dissertation on the following subject: what causes principally contribute to render a nation populous? And what effect has the populousness of a nation on its trade? – became his first published work, and it won him a prize, for dissertations on trade matters. He was one of two winners that year of a prize recently created by the politician-aristocrat Charles Townshend, reflecting the importance of mercantile interests to the contemporary political establishment. The published version of the dissertation was dedicated to another, exceptionally powerful politician, the Duke of Newcastle, on whose behalf Bell, in turn, subsequently proved himself what one source terms an "able university politician". Bell's published work on the interaction of trade and changes in population levels proved moderately influential in the debates on subjects that fired academic debate at the time: a German-language translation appeared in 1762, under the less convoluted title Quellen und Folgen einer starken Bevölkerung.

William Bell (1731–1816): publications (not a complete list)

- "A Dissertation on 'What Causes principally contribute to render a Nation Populous, and what Effect has the Populousness of a Nation on its Trade'", Cambridge, 1756
- "An Enquiry into the Divine Missions of John the Baptist and Jesus Christ, so far as they can be proved from the circumstances of their births and their connection with each other", London, 1761
- A second edition of "An Enquiry...", with a prefix entitled "Arguments in proof of the Authenticity of the Narratives of the Births of John and Jesus contained in the two first chapters of the Gospels of St. Matthew and St. Luke", 1810
- "A Defence of Revelation in general and the Gospel in particular; in answer to the objections advanced in a late book entitled 'The Morality of the New Testament, digested under various heads,' &c., and subscribed, a Rational Christian", 1765.
- "A Sermon preached in Lambeth Chapel at the consecration of Dr. Thomas, Bishop of Rochester", 1774
- "An Attempt to ascertain and illustrate the Authority, Nature, and Design of the Institution of Christ, commonly called the Communion and the Lord's Supper", 1780; a second edition, 1781.
- "An Enquiry whether any Doctrine relating to the Nature and Effects of the Lord's Supper can be justly founded on the Discourse of our Lord recorded in the sixth chapter of the Gospel of St. John", 1790. (A supplement accompanying a new edition of "An Attempt to ascertain..." –previous editions: 1780 & 1781)

Further published outputs followed. A constant theme was Bell's concern always to assert biblical authority in support of his theological positions, although others sometimes construed his own interpretations of scripture as over-contrived.

In or before 1765, Bell left Cambridge in order to become Domestic Chaplain to Princess Amelia, one of the younger sisters of the new king, George III. He accordingly moved to join the staff at the Princess's recently acquired manor at Gunnersbury House. In 1765, probably through the influence of his patroness, the Princess Amelia, Bell became a Prebendary at Westminster Abbey. Sources also attribute his doctorate of Divinity (DD), which arrived in 1767 "per literas regias", partially to the influence of Princess Amelia.

In 1776, Bell was presented with an additional living, becoming Vicar of St Bride's Church in central London, an appointment "within the gift" of the Dean and Chapter of Westminster. He resigned from St Bride's in 1780, when he instead became rector of Christchurch, Newgate Street, where he was the incumbent minister till 1799. An obituary published in 1816, reflecting ethical norms of the regency period, states that Bell also "enjoyed the Treasurer's valuable stall in St, Paul's Cathedral", although a source from later in the nineteenth century reassures readers that he "administered [this] office with becoming disinterestedness".

When Bell's father died in 1768/69, he bequeathed sufficient assets to have written a will, and sources imply that Bell's ecclesiastical functions were well remunerated. He became notable "for acts of discerning liberality".

In 1800, Bell donated £15,200 worth of 3 per cent fixed interest government bonds to Cambridge University to create a trust, the income from which should fund annual scholarships for the education of eight undergraduate sons or orphans of Church of England clergy whose family resources were insufficient fully to fund the students. A condition was that none of the scholars thus funded should be elected from King's College or Trinity Hall.

William Bell died on 29 September 1829. He was still a prebendary at Westminster Abbey, and he died aged 85 at the home that went with the job in Little Dean's Yard, Westminster.

== Controversy ==
Much of what Bell wrote was considered contentious by contemporaries. The publication that resonated most widely appeared in 1780 (with a second edition in 1781) and was entitled An attempt to ascertain and illustrate the authority, nature, and design of the institute of Christ commonly called the communion of the Lord's supper. At 40 pages in length, the treatise itself, which was dedicated to Princess Amelia, may have been construed as brief, but it was backed by notes and appendices and notes to the appendices, which were in places polemical in character.

The purpose of the treatise was to assert the exclusively scriptural foundation of church beliefs. Treading boldly where others might have been content to avoid or finesse the arguments, Bell's treatise strongly refuted the doctrine of Transubstantiation. A note with the appendices attacked Bishop William Warburton, whose own writings indicated an approach closer to what would later come to be identified as Anglo-Catholicism. As fundamentalist partisans piled in on both sides, theological differences became increasingly shrill, and Bell found himself attacked by Lewis Bagot, by now Dean of Christ Church at Oxford, for advancing "Socinian doctrines utterly inconsistent with the teachings of the Church of England." Bell responded by issuing a new edition of his treatise in 1790, now with a supplement repeating his basic contentions with more passion than ever.
