= William Matthews (bookbinder) =

Scottish-American bookbinder

- Born: 1822; Scotland
- Died: 1896 (aged 73–74)
- Spouse: Julia Elizabeth Marle
- Parent(s): Peter and Margaret Ross Matthews

William Matthews was an American bookbinder once called "the most famous bookbinder America has produced".

Matthews was born in Scotland in 1822. In 1833 he was enrolled in the London Orphan Asylum After leaving he apprenticed with London bookbinders Remnant and Edmonds. In December 1843 be emigrated to Brooklyn, New York where he married Julia Elizabeth Marle, daughter of bookbinder William Marle.

Matthews was naturalized an American citizen in 1850, showed his work at the 1876 Philadelphia Centennial and died in 1896.
