= Christ Church, East Layton =

Anglican church in East Layton, North Yorkshire, England

Coordinates: 54.4837°N 1.7487°W

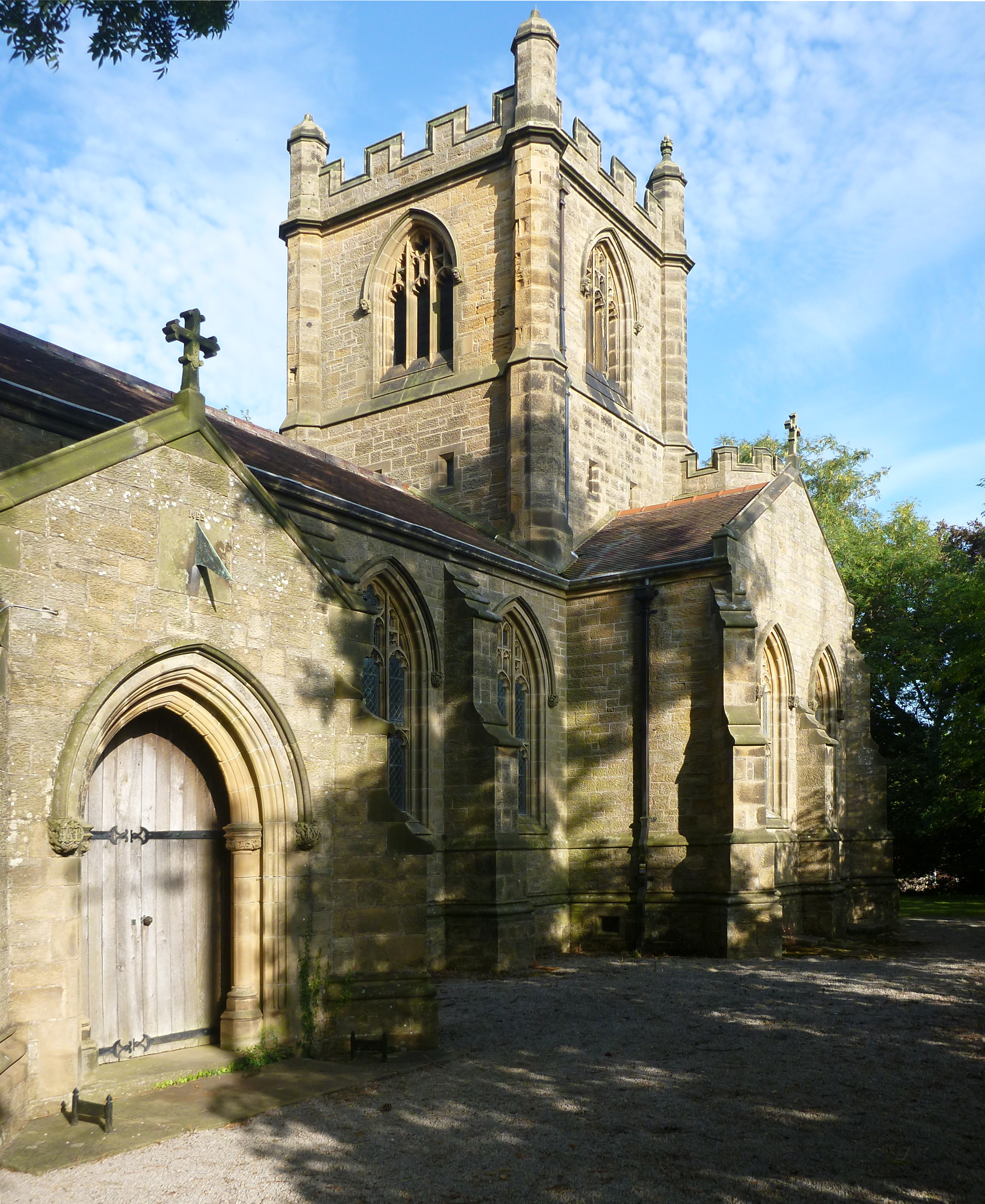
The church, in 2013

Christ Church is an Anglican church in East Layton, a village in North Yorkshire, in England.

A chapel in East Layton was first recorded in 1619. The current building was constructed in 1895, commissioned by Mrs Maynard Proud, and is still owned by her family trust. It was designed by James Pigott Pritchett Jr and Herbert Dewes Pritchett, and is said to be modelled on the design of Worcester Cathedral. It was originally a chapel of ease to St John the Baptist's Church, Stanwick, and is now in the parish of St Cuthbert's Church, Forcett. It was grade II listed in 1969. In the 2010s, the owning family restored the church at a cost of £20,000. It is not licensed for weddings, but in 2014 it was granted a special licence by the Archbishop of York to hold its first ever marriage ceremony.

The church is built of stone with tile roofs, and is in the Perpendicular style. It has a cruciform plan, consisting of a nave, a south porch, north and south transepts, a chancel, and a tower at the crossing. The tower has octagonal diagonal buttresses rising to turret finials, three-light bell openings with hood moulds, and an embattled parapet. Inside, original fittings include the altar, reredos, pulpit, pews, vestry screen and font.

== See also ==
- Listed buildings in East Layton
