= Hugh Smithson (disambiguation) =

Sir Hugh Smithson, 4th Baronet was an English landowner.

Hugh Smithson may also refer to:

- Sir Hugh Smithson, 1st Baronet of the Smithson baronets
- Sir Hugh Smithson, 3rd Baronet of the Smithson baronets

== See also ==
- Smithson (surname)
