= Aldbrough St John =

Village and civil parish in North Yorkshire, England

Coordinates: 54°29′49″N 1°41′17″W

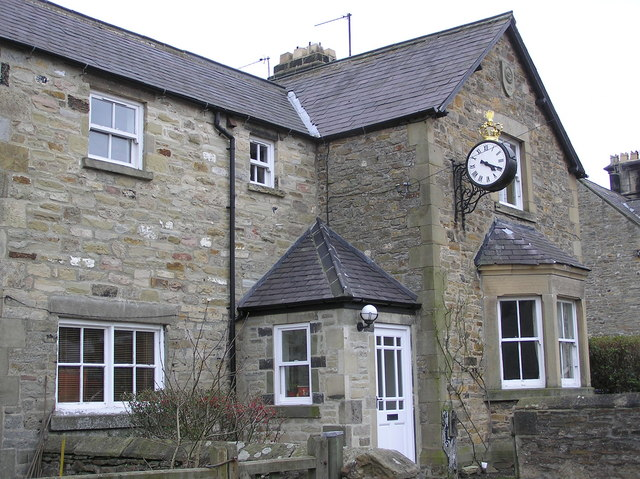
- Estate house at Aldbrough St John - formerly a post office hence the clock

- Location within North Yorkshire
- Population: 392 (2011 census)
- OS grid reference: NZ202112
- Civil parish: Aldbrough
- Unitary authority: North Yorkshire
- Ceremonial county: North Yorkshire
- Region: Yorkshire and the Humber
- Country: England
- Sovereign state: United Kingdom
- Post town: RICHMOND
- Postcode district: DL11
- Police: North Yorkshire
- Fire: North Yorkshire
- Ambulance: Yorkshire

Aldbrough St John is a village and civil parish (called just Aldbrough) in North Yorkshire, England. The parish has a population of 325 (2001 census), increasing to 392 at the 2011 Census.

From 1974 to 2023 it was part of the district of Richmondshire, it is now administered by the unitary North Yorkshire Council.

The village is 6 miles (9 km) west of Darlington, 7 miles (12 km) north of Richmond and 2 miles (3 km) north of junction 56 on the A1(M) motorway. The road north from junction 56 of the A1(M) is part of Dere Street and runs up to Piercebridge and beyond. Because of its proximity to the Roman Road in the east, the A66 (former Roman Road) to the south and the River Tees to the north, suggestions of Romano-British settlements persist around the village.

== History ==
In the Norse language Aldbrough means "Old Burh" or fortified stronghold. The St John suffix was added to the name in the 1930s by the Post Office to avoid confusion with the Aldborough near Boroughbridge. At one time Aldbrough St John had a "small castle". We know this from John Leland's account in 1540 that "There appere great ruines of a howse or litle castel at Albruch village, and thereby rennith a bekke. It standith a 2 mile south from Perse Bridg on Tese". Perse Bridg is now called Piercebridge 2 miles (3 km) north of Aldbrough referred to above as Albruch.

When the Duchess of Northumberland came to live in the village in the 1865, she had many of the old properties removed and the stone used to build new houses. It is generally accepted that any castle remains were also removed at this time. The foundations of this building were recently found by local historians Ian Wardle, Grant Rowley and David Shires in what is believed to have been the "burh" oval. A property of this type within the village is thought by Ian Wardle to be the reason why Aldbrough not only remained but increased in value in Norman times when all villages around were sacked and burned. He believes that Aldbrough was at the centre of the lands occupied by the local lord so may have been spared. Eleanor also funded the construction of St Paul's Church, which was completed in 1890.

Quarries at the south-western edge of the village supplied a red limestone, which was used for buildings in Richmond, Aldbrough St John, Forcett, Stanwick St John and East Layton. The church in Aldbrough St John is constructed of this stone.

A packhorse bridge crosses Aldbrough Beck near Aldborough and is grade II listed.

== See also ==
- Listed buildings in Aldbrough St John
