= Charles Michell (cricketer) =

English cricketer and British Army officer (1849–1900)

Personal information
- Full name: Charles Michell
- Born: 17 February 1849; York, Yorkshire, England
- Died: 25 January 1900 (aged 50); Forcett, Yorkshire, England
- Batting: Right-handed
- Relatives: Edward Michell (brother)

Career statistics
Competition	First-class
Matches	1
Runs scored	1
Batting average	1.00
100s/50s	–/–
Top score	1
Catches/stumpings	1/–
- Source: Cricinfo, 3 February 2022

Charles Michell (17 February 1849 — 25 January 1900) was an English first-class cricketer and British Army officer.

The son of John Michell, he was born at York in February 1849. He was educated at Haileybury, where he excelled at athletics. After completing his education, Michell entered into the 67th Foot as a cornet by purchase in October 1867, with promotion to lieutenant following in November 1871, at which point he was serving with the King's Royal Rifle Corps. Michell played first-class cricket in 1875, making a single appearance for the Gentlemen of Marylebone Cricket Club against the Gentlemen of Kent at the Canterbury Cricket Week; Michell was not originally in the starting eleven, but was a substitute for William Kington. He batted in the Gentlemen second innings and was dismissed for a single run by Dick Penn. He was promoted to captain in July 1864, and was an Instructor of Musketry from 1876. Michell served in the Anglo-Zulu War of 1879, during which he was present at the Battle of Gingindlovu, and later served in the First Boer War of 1880–81. He retired from active service in December 1882, with a gratuity. He died at his Forcett Hall residence in North Yorkshire in January 1900. His brother, Edward, was also a first-class cricketer.
