= Edward Michell (cricketer) =

English cricketer

Personal information
- Full name: Edward John Michell
- Born: 15 June 1853; Forcett, Yorkshire, England
- Died: 5 May 1900 (aged 46); Christchurch, New Zealand
- Batting: Right-handed
- Relatives: Charles Michell (brother)

Domestic team information
- Years: Team
- 1880: Hampshire

Career statistics
Competition	First-class
Matches	1
Runs scored	7
Batting average	7.00
100s/50s	–/–
Top score	7
Catches/stumpings	1/–
- Source: Cricinfo, 31 January 2010

Edward John Michell (15 June 1853 — 5 May 1900) was an English first-class cricketer.

The son of the Scottish land proprietor and magistrate John Michell, he was born at the Forcett Park estate in Yorkshire in June 1853. He was educated at Harrow School, where he played for the school cricket team. Michell later made a single appearance in first-class cricket for Hampshire against the Marylebone Cricket Club at Southampton in 1880. Batting once in the match, he was dismissed for 7 runs in Hampshire's only innings by Robert Clayton, with Hampshire winning the match by an innings and 38 runs. He later emigrated to New Zealand, where he died at Cranmer Square in Christchurch on 5 May 1900. His brother, Charles, was also a first-class cricketer.
