= St Paul's Church, Aldbrough St John =

Church in Aldbrough St John, North Yorkshire, England

Coordinates: 54°29′46″N 1°41′19″W

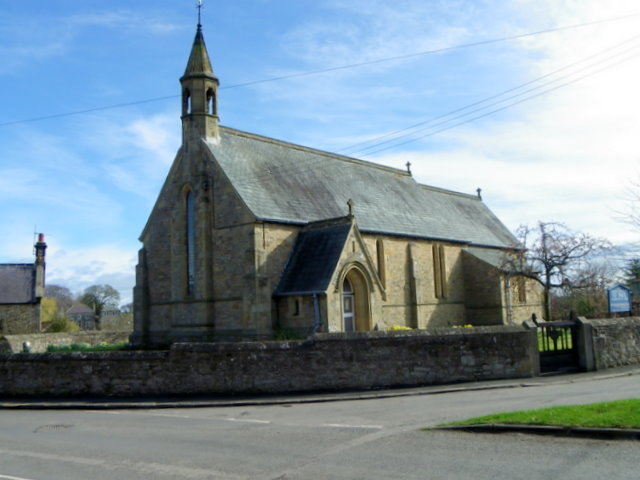
The church, in 2011

St Paul's Church is the parish church of Aldbrough St John, a village in North Yorkshire, in England.

Aldbrough was recorded in the Domesday Book as having a church, but that is believed to be the forerunner of St John the Baptist's Church, Stanwick. A chapel was built in the village of Aldbrough itself in about 1200, but the church at Stanwick remained the parish church, and its dedication was later appended to the name of the village.

St Paul's Church was constructed in 1890, as a chapel of ease to the church at Stanwick. It was designed by William Searle Hicks, and funded by Eleanor Percy, Duchess of Northumberland. The church was Grade II listed in 1969, and finally became the parish church in 1990.

The church is designed in the Early English style. It is built of sandstone rubble, with a slate roof. It has a three-bay nave, with a south porch, and a two-bay chancel, with a choir and a vestry. The west gable is surmounted by an octagonal bell turret and spirelet. The windows are lancets, sometimes paired, and tripled at the east end.

== See also ==
- Listed buildings in Aldbrough St John
