= Listed buildings in Forcett =

Forcett is a civil parish in the county of North Yorkshire, England. It contains 14 listed buildings that are recorded in the National Heritage List for England. Of these, one is listed at Grade I, the highest of the three grades, four are at Grade II*, the middle grade, and the others are at Grade II, the lowest grade. The parish contains the village of Forcett and the surrounding area. The most important building is Forcett Hall, which is listed together with associated structures in the gardens and grounds. The other listed buildings are a church, tombs in the churchyard, kennels converted into a house, and a milepost.

== Key ==
Grade	Criteria
I	Buildings of exceptional interest, sometimes considered to be internationally important
II*	Particularly important buildings of more than special interest
II	Buildings of national importance and special interest

== Buildings ==
Name and location	Photograph	Date	Notes	Grade
St Cuthbert's Church; 54.50522°N 1.73034°W		12th century	The church has been altered and extended through the centuries, in particular during a restoration in 1857–59. It is built in sandstone with a Westmorland slate roof, and consists of a nave, a north aisle, a south porch, a chancel with a north vestry, and a west tower. The tower has four stages, a plinth, quoins, a square stair turret to the northeast, a lancet window with a hood mould, two-light bell openings, a clock face on the east side, and an embattled parapet. The porch is gabled and contains a round-headed doorway with waterleaf capitals to the shafts and an inner round-headed doorway with two orders, Incorporated into the porch are Anglo-Saxon and medieval carved stones.	II
Ambrose Pierson chest tomb 54.50511°N 1.73030°W	—	c. 1706	The chest tomb is in the churchyard of St Cuthbert's Church to the south of the nave. It is in sandstone, with a moulded base and lid. There are fielded panels with moulded frames on two sides and the end, and on the lid is an inscription.	II
Two chest tombs 54.50513°N 1.73011°W	—	Early 18th century	The two tombs are in the churchyard of St Cuthbert's Church to the south of the chancel. They are in sandstone and lie parallel to each other. Each tomb has a chamfered base, and fielded panels on the sides and the end. The lids are moulded and inscribed.	II
East gateway and lodges 54.50594°N 1.73119°W		Early 18th century	At the east entrance to the grounds of Forcett Hall is a gateway and lodges in sandstone. The gateway has a central round-arched carriageway flanked by flat-headed pedestrian entrances. It has four Roman Doric half-columns carrying an open central pediment, and a large Doric frieze over the side gates, and is surmounted by five large urn finials. The decorative gates are in cast iron, and the gateway is linked to the lodges by walls with cast iron railings with decorative finials. Each lodge has a single storey and a single bay, and contains a Venetian window within a round arch, and above it is a pediment. The doorway has a ]rusticated quoined surround, and a lintel with a large tripartite keystone.	II*
North gateway 54.50806°N 1.74029°W		Early 18th century	The north entrance to the grounds of Forcett Hall is flanked by square sandstone gate piers. Each pier has a plain base, banded rustication on the front and rear, an abacus, a moulded cornice and a pyramidal top. The gates are in cast iron, and have anthemion finials.	II
Forcett Hall; 54.50642°N 1.73575°W		c. 1740	A country house in sandstone with some render, and a hipped M-shaped roof in Westmorland slate. The main block has three storeys, seven bays on the front, four bays on the returns, and to the left is a two-storey five-bay service range. The east front of the main block has a plinth, rusticated quoin strips, a dentilled cornice, and a pediment over the middle three bays. In the centre is a basket arched doorway with an architrave, unfluted Ionic plasters, a frieze and a cornice. The windows are sashes in architraves. The garden front has three storeys and a rusticated basement. The middle five bays project and have giant Ionic pilasters. In the centre is an imperial staircase leading to a French window with an architrave, a pulvinated frieze, and a broken segmental pediment.	I
Walker tombstone 54.50512°N 1.73024°W	—	c. 1741	The tombstone is in the churchyard of St Cuthbert's Church to the southeast of the nave. It is in sandstone, and has an inscription framed by an aedicule with an open pediment.	II
Dovecote; 54.50739°N 1.73166°W		Mid to late 18th century	The dovecote in the grounds of Forcett Hall is in sandstone and brick, with a band, a moulded cornice, and a hipped Westmorland slate roof. There is a hexagonal plan, and two stages. On each face in the ground floor is an open round arch, and on the angles are piers with bases and imposts. The upper stage contains blind round-arched openings with a sill band and an impost band. On the roof is a wooden colonnaded cupola with a lead conical roof and a weathervane.	II*
Sundial; 54.50729°N 1.73300°W	—	1766	The sundial in the centre of the kitchen garden of Forcett Hall is in sandstone. It consists of a fluted Doric column on a circular plinth and step. On the top is a bronze dial and gnomon, with an inscription, a signature and the date.	II
Stable block, Forcett Hall; 54.50629°N 1.73449°W	—	c. 1770	The stable block to the east of the hall is in sandstone with hipped Westmorland slate roofs, and consists of a two-storey main range and single-storey wings to the rear, forming a U-shaped plan. The main range has nine bays, the middle three bays projecting under a pediment. In the centre is a round-arched carriageway, and the outer bays contain arcades with round-arched sash windows in recessed round arches, and a continuous impost band. The other ranges contain various openings, in the south range is a pump in a wooden box, and at the end of the north range is a lean-to store with a Welsh slate roof on an Ionic column.	II*
Garden walls with gates and Garden House; 54.50701°N 1.73356°W	—	Late 18th century	The walls enclosing the kitchen garden of Forcett Hall are in brick-lined stone with stone coping, and form a quadrangle. The openings include doorways, cart openings, and segmental-arched openings with wrought iron gates. The Garden House has a single storey and five bays. It is in stone with rendered panels, and a hipped Westmorland slate roof.	II
Grotto and icehouse 54.50434°N 1.73894°W	—	Late 18th century	The grotto and icehouse are in the grounds of Forcett Hall, and are in sandstone and brick. The grotto has three bays, and a passage from the middle bay leads to a circular brick icehouse. The grotto has three roundish arches, behind which are three barrel vaulted chambers. From the outer sides, doorways with pointed arches lead to the garden.	II*
The Kennels; 54.50407°N 1.72620°W	—	Mid 19th century	The kennels of the former Stanwick Park have been converted into a house. The building is in sandstone with chamfered rusticated quoins, and a Westmorland slate roof with shaped kneelers and stone coping. There is a single storey and a U-shaped plan, with a main range of nine bays and projecting side ranges. The main range has a central round-ached doorway flanked by sash windows, above are oculi, and the doorway is at the rear. In the side ranges are Diocletian windows and sashes, and at the ends the roofs are hipped.	II
Milepost; 54.51132°N 1.74935°W	—	Late 19th century	The milepost on the west side of the B6274 road, is in cast iron and has a triangular plan. On the top is "RICHMOND HD", and on the sides are pointing hands, and the distances to Staindrop and to Richmond.	II
