= Listed buildings in Aldbrough St John =

Aldbrough St John is a civil parish in the county of North Yorkshire, England. It contains 25 listed buildings that are recorded in the National Heritage List for England. All the listed buildings are designated at Grade II, the lowest of the three grades, which is applied to "buildings of national importance and special interest". The parish contains the village of Aldbrough St John and the surrounding countryside. Most of the listed buildings are houses, cottages and associated structures, farmhouses and farm buildings. The others include a packhorse bridge, a road bridge, a well, a pinfold, a water pump and a church.

== Buildings ==
Name and location	Photograph	Date	Notes
Packhorse bridge 54.49757°N 1.68934°W		16th or 17th century	The former packhorse bridge carries a footpath over Aldbrough Beck. It is in stone and consists of three uneven segmental pointed arches, with the piers of uneven size on concrete bases. The parapets have triangular coping, on the downstream side ending in a monolithic roughly-shaped stone to the south.
Pigeoncote, Aldbrough House; 54.49545°N 1.68885°W	—	16th or 17th century	The pigeoncote, which is now derelict, is in stone with a circular plan, tapering towards the top. There are the remains of a stone slate conical cap, and some of the square nesting boxes are exposed.
Aldbrough House; 54.49544°N 1.68771°W	—	Late 17th century	The house, which has been altered, is in stone with a Welsh slate roof. The main block has quoins, three storeys and three bays. In the centre is a segmental-arched doorway with engaged Tuscan columns, a three-pane fanlight, a frieze, a cornice and a blocking course. To the left is a two-storey range. Most of the windows are sashes, and there is a blocked three-light mullioned and transomed window.
Dilston House; 54.50055°N 1.68591°W	—	Late 17th to early 18th century	Two houses later combined into one, in roughcast stone, with roofs of pantile and Welsh slate. There are two storeys and five bays, and an outshut on the right. The two doorways each has a quoined surround, and ogee moulding to the arris. The right doorway is flanked by canted bay windows, and most of the other windows are sashes. At the rear is a blocked segmental opening with a quoined surround.
Old Hall and Cottages; 54.49721°N 1.68587°W	—	Early to mid 18th century	A house divided into a house and two cottages. It is in stone with some brick dressings and hipped Welsh slate roofs. The central block has three storeys and five bays, and the projecting two-storey single-bay wings form the cottages. In the centre is a doorway with an architrave, a fanlight, a pulvinated frieze and a pediment, and the windows in all parts are sashes with flat brick arches.
Cordilleras Farmhouse; 54.49606°N 1.68913°W		Mid 18th century	The house is in stone, and has a tile roof with stone slate at the eaves, moulded stone coping, and shaped kneelers. There are two storeys and seven bays. The main doorway has an architrave and a broken pediment, and in the right bay is a doorway with a plain surround. The windows are sashes with flat heads, and in the right return is an oculus in the gable.
Wath Urn Bridge; 54.48869°N 1.67025°W	—	1755	The bridge, which was widened in 1948, carries the B6275 road over Clow Beck. It is in sandstone, and consists of three segmental arches. The bridge has small triangular cutwaters, a parapet with slightly-segmental coping, and an inscribed and dated plaque.
Well; 54.49705°N 1.68987°W	—	Mid to late 18th century (probable)	The well is in sandstone with a cast iron pipe. It consists of a circular bollard about 500 millimetres (20 in) in diameter, and 1 metre (3 ft 3 in) high. It has a square base, an octagonal abacus and a hemispherical cap. On the southeast side, the pipe discharges water into a sunken pool surrounded by dressed stone slabs, and with a stepped side to the east.
West Dilston House and East Dilston House; 54.49871°N 1.68873°W	—	Late 18th century	A pair of houses in sandstone with pantile roofs and stone slates to the eaves. There are two storeys and a U-shaped plan, with a central range and projecting wings with hipped roofs. The main doorway has a lintel scored to resemble voussoirs, and on the fronts of the wings are Venetian windows. The other windows are a mix of sashes and casements, some with round-arched heads.
Aldbrough Hall; 54.49744°N 1.68626°W		Late 18th or early 19th century	The house is in sandstone, with chamfered rusticated quoins, and a hipped Westmorland slate roof. There are two storeys, a double depth plan, and five bays, the middle three bays projecting under a pediment. In the centre is a round-arched doorway with engaged Tuscan columns, an architrave with pilaster capitals, a fanlight with Gothic glazing, a fluted frieze with quatrefoil paterae and a pediment. The windows are sashes in architraves. In the left return are two doorways and a round-arched stair window.
Gate piers and wall, Aldbrough Hall; 54.49734°N 1.68634°W	—	Late 18th or early 19th century	Opposite the entrance to the house is a pair of monolithic square stone gate piers, each with a base and a cornice capital. The wall enclosing the front garden is in stone with flat coping, and is about 1 metre (3 ft 3 in) high, with ogee-shaped capitals at intervals. It is curved at the left corner, and at the ends are square piers with bases, bands and caps.
Ashmoor and the Homestead; 54.49567°N 1.68892°W		Late 18th or early 19th century	A pair of houses in sandstone, with a cornice, and a pantile roof with stone slate at the eaves, a stone coped gable and shaped kneelers on the left, and hipped on the right. There are two storeys and an L-shaped plan, with fronts of three bays, and a rear outshut. On each front is a doorway with a raised stone surround and a splayed base, and the windows are sashes with raised surrounds.
Milestone and mile post 54.49329°N 1.68680°W	—	Late 18th or early 19th century	The milestone and mile post are on the east side of the road. The milestone is earlier, it is in sandstone, with a triangular plan and a damaged top, and on the left side is a pointing hand. The mile post dates from about 1889, and is in cast iron with a triangular plan. The top is inscribed "RICHMOND HD", on the sides are pointing hands, on the left side is the distance to Lucy Cross, and on the right side to Richmond.
Pinfold; 54.49691°N 1.69006°W		Late 18th or early 19th century (probable)	The pinfold is in stone with an irregular rectangular plan, and walls about 2 metres (6 ft 7 in) high. The walls have rounded coping, quoins at the external angles, and there is an opening in the north corner.
Pump; 54.49806°N 1.68886°W		Late 18th or early 19th century (probable)	The water pump on the village green is in sandstone, and consists of a monolithic cylindrical shaft about 750 millimetres (30 in) in diameter and 1.5 metres (4 ft 11 in) high with a conical cap. On the south side is a recess, formerly for a spout and with holes for a handle, now with a tap.
Brookside; 54.49763°N 1.68920°W		Early 19th century	The house is in sandstone, with quoins, and a pantile roof with stone coping and shaped kneelers. There are two storeys and two bays. The windows are sashes, those in the upper floor with voussoirs to flat arches.
Gate piers, gates and railings southwest of packhorse bridge 54.49745°N 1.68958°W	—	Early 19th century	The gate piers are in sandstone and are about 2 metres (6 ft 7 in) high. They have monolithic cylindrical shafts, and Tuscan bases and caps. Between them are wrought iron gates with spiked tops. To the right is a smaller matching gate, and on each side are railings with cast iron urn finials to the standards.
Manor Farmhouse; 54.49974°N 1.68508°W	—	1831	The farmhouse is in sandstone on a chamfered plinth, with quoins, a moulded sill string course, and stone slate roofs, and is in Jacobethan style. There are two storeys and attics, and a cruciform plan, with fronts of five bays. The windows are mullioned with hood moulds, and some have transoms. In an angle is a flat-roofed porch, and a doorway with a moulded surround, a shouldered lintel, a hood mould, and a cornice carrying a parapet with moulded coping.
Calf House, Manor Farm; 54.49972°N 1.68479°W	—	c. 1832	The calf house is in stone, with quoins and a hipped slate roof. There is a single storey and two bays, and it contains two doors.
Pigeoncote, Manor Farm; 54.49968°N 1.68460°W	—	1832	The pigeoncote is in stone on a plinth, with quoins, a moulded sill band, and a hipped Welsh slate roof with lead over the hips, and a timber glover. There are two storeys and a single bay. It contains a stable door with a hood mould, above which is an initialled and dated plaque, and in the upper floor are shuttered vents.
Farm buildings northeast of Manor Farmhouse; 54.49990°N 1.68486°W	—	c. 1832	The farm buildings are in stone with quoins and stone slate roofs, and they form four ranges around a covered courtyard. The southwest range has a single-storey cart shed and a riding-horse stable range, and a two-storey stable with a hayloft. In the northeast range is a six-bay granary, projecting from which is a six-sided gin-gang, and the return ranges have a single storey, the northwest range with low walls forming pens with water and feed troughs.
Aldbrough St John Cottage; 54.49856°N 1.68919°W		Early to mid 19th century	The house is in sandstone, with quoins, and a Welsh slate roof with stone coping and shaped kneelers. There are two storeys, two bays, and a single-storey garage on the right. The central doorway has a raised stone surround, a frieze with three paterae and a moulded arris, and a cornice on Tuscan corbels, each with a patera. The windows are sashes with raised surrounds.
The Hawthorns; 54.49758°N 1.68668°W	—	Early to mid 19th century	A stone house with chamfered rusticated quoins and a hipped Welsh slate roof. There are two storeys and three bays. The central doorway has a fanlight, and the windows are sashes.
Carlton Green; 54.50781°N 1.69629°W		1846	A farmhouse in stone on a plinth, with quoins and a Westmorland slate roof, it is in Jacobethan style. There are two storeys and an irregular plan, and the windows are double-chamfered and mullioned, some with transoms. In the centre of the south front is a two-storey porch with a coped gable, containing a doorway with a chamfered surround, a Tudor arch and a hood mould, and to its left is a gabled bay. At the rear is a two-storey wing, and a single-storey porch, and in both returns are gabled bays.
St Paul's Church; 54.49605°N 1.68852°W		1890	The church is in sandstone with a roof of Westmorland slate, and consists of a three-bay nave with a south porch, and a two-bay chancel with north and south vestries. On the west gable is an octagonal bellcote, under which is a narrow, tall lancet window. The other windows in the church are also lancets, and the porch is gabled, containing a doorway with a pointed arch, a moulded arris and a hood mould, and an apex cross.
