= Listed buildings in East Layton =

East Layton is a civil parish in the county of North Yorkshire, England. It contains eight listed buildings that are recorded in the National Heritage List for England. All the listed buildings are designated at Grade II, the lowest of the three grades, which is applied to "buildings of national importance and special interest". The parish contains the village of East Layton and the surrounding countryside. The listed buildings are all in the village, and consist of houses, a farmhouse and farm buildings, a former school, a former smithy and a church.

== Buildings ==
Name and location	Photograph	Date	Notes
East Layton Old Hall and gateway 54.48437°N 1.74713°W	—	16th century	A manor house and cottage, now incorporated, in sandstone, with roofs of pantile and stone slate with stone coping and shaped kneelers. There are two storeys and a loft, and the east front has quoins and four bays. The doorway has a deep lintel, and the windows include sashes, some windows with chamfered surrounds and some with mullions. Attached to the house is a gateway with a central round-arched opening flanked by shell niches, and an entablature on consoles.
West Farmhouse and Cottage; 54.48591°N 1.75511°W	—	Mid to late 17th century	The farmhouse and cottage are in stone, with quoins, stone slate roofs with stone coping and kneelers, and two storeys. The house is the older and has four bays. In the centre is a doorway with a chamfered surround, and a lintel with a Tudor arched soffit, flanked by double-chamfered cross windows. The upper floor contains two mullioned windows, a casement window and an oculus. The cottage to the left dates from the early 19th century and has two bays. The windows are a mix of casements and sashes.
The Ford; 54.48435°N 1.74781°W	—	Late 17th century or earlier	The house, which was later extended, is in stone with quoins, a pantile roof, and two storeys. The main house has two bays, and a central doorway with a chamfered quoined surround and a lintel with a Tudor arched soffit. This is flanked by sash windows, and in the upper floor is a casement window with a chamfered surround, and a sash window. The added bay to the right has horizontally-sliding sash windows, and to the left is a lower range with two storeys, containing sash windows.
Stable with granary, West Farmhouse Cottage; 54.48596°N 1.75564°W	—	Late 18th century	The farm building is in stone, with quoins, and a pantile roof with stone slate at the eaves, stone coping and shaped kneelers. There are two storeys and three bays. In the ground floor are external steps, and two doorways with chamfered quoined surrounds, and the upper floor contains a doorway and two shuttered openings.
Old School Room; 54.48538°N 1.75408°W	—	Late 18th century	The former school is in stone, partly rendered, with quoins, and a pantile roof with raised verges and reverse crowstepping. There is a single storey and three bays. On the front is a doorway with a pointed arch and sash windows. On the left gable is a bellcote, and below it is a circular opening.
Old Smithy; 54.48354°N 1.74777°W		Late 18th to early 19th century	The former smithy, later used as a store, is in stone with quoins and a pantile roof. There is a single storey and three bays. On the front is a window and a doorway, and at the rear is a gabled projection.
East Layton Hall; 54.48504°N 1.75183°W	—	Early to mid 19th century	The house is in stuccoed stone on a stone plinth, with chamfered rusticated quoins, a floor band, an eaves band, and a roof of Westmorland slate and artificial stone slate. There are two storeys and fronts of three bays. In the centre of the south front is a Roman Doric distyle portico, with triglyphs, metopes, guttae, mutules, and a pediment, and the doorway has a basket-arched fanlight and a tripartite keystone. To the left is a segmental bow window, and the other windows are sashes. On the right is a single-storey wing with a canted bay window.
Christ Church; 54.48373°N 1.74875°W		1895	The church is in stone with tile roofs, and is in Perpendicular style. There is a cruciform plan, consisting of a nave, a south porch, north and south transepts, a chancel, and a tower at the crossing. The tower has octagonal diagonal buttresses rising to turret finials, three-light bell openings with hood moulds, and an embattled parapet.
