= Listed buildings in Stanwick St John =

Stanwick St John is a civil parish in the county of North Yorkshire, England. It contains 16 listed buildings that are recorded in the National Heritage List for England. Of these, one is listed at Grade I, the highest of the three grades, and the others are at Grade II, the lowest grade. The parish contains the village of Stanwick St John and the surrounding countryside. The most important building in the village is St John the Baptist's Church, which is listed, together with associated structures, including memorials and a cross shaft in the churchyard and two nearby wells. The other listed buildings include structures associated with the demolished Stanwick Park, houses and farmhouses, a deer shelter, and two bridges.

== Key ==
Grade	Criteria
I	Buildings of exceptional interest, sometimes considered to be internationally important
II	Buildings of national importance and special interest

== Buildings ==
Name and location	Photograph	Date	Notes	Grade
Saxon cross-shaft 54.50279°N 1.71528°W		9th century (probable)	The cross shaft is in the churchyard of St John the Baptist's Church, to the southeast of the church. It is in sandstone, about 500 millimetres (20 in) in height, and has a rectangular plan. The shaft is set on a base, and has interlace decoration.	II
St John the Baptist's Church; 54.50284°N 1.71560°W		13th century	The church has been altered and extended through the centuries, including a restoration in 1866 by Anthony Salvin. It is built in stone with roofs of stone slate and lead, and consists of a nave, a south aisle, a south porch, a chancel with a north vestry and a west tower. The tower has three stages, quoins, stepped diagonal buttresses, a north five-sided stair turret, lancet windows in the lower stages, two-light bell openings, and an embattled parapet.	I
Kirkridge House, Stanwick Old Hall and gate piers 54.50235°N 1.71448°W		Mid to late 17th century	A farmhouse divided into two houses, it is in stone with quoins, string courses, and a stone slate roof with stone coping and shaped kneelers. There is a U-shaped plan with a main range of two storeys and attics and nine bays, and, lower rear wings. On the front are two doorways, the left with a quoined surround and a moulded arris. The windows on the two outer bays at each end are sashes, on the other bays they are cross windows, and on the attics are four gabled dormers with kneelers. At the rear and on the wings, some windows are mullioned. Between the rear wings is a low wall with three gate piers.	II
Four tombstones in a line 54.50274°N 1.71581°W	—	Early 18th century	The tombstones are in the churchyard of St John the Baptist's Church, to the south of the church. They are in sandstone and consist of slabs with different shaped tops, and with inscriptions.	II
Slater Memorial; 54.50272°N 1.71567°W	—	Early 18th century	The memorial is in the churchyard of St John the Baptist's Church, to the south of the church, and is to the memory of Richard Slater. It consists of a sandstone tombstone with a rounded top and a ball finial. On the tombstone is a skull and crossbones, and a worn inscription flanked by pilasters supporting a frieze.	II
Group of four tombstones 54.50272°N 1.71556°W	—	18th century	The tombstones are in a row in the churchyard of St John the Baptist's Church, to the south of the church. They are in sandstone and consist of slabs with different shaped tops, different decorations, and with inscriptions.	II
Newcomb Memorial; 54.50268°N 1.71565°W	—	1752	The memorial is in the churchyard of St John the Baptist's Church, to the south of the church, and is to the memory of William Newcomb. It consists of a sandstone tombstone with a scroll-moulded top. On the front is a commemorative inscription, and on the back is a patera and a motto.	II
Clock House and gate piers 54.49810°N 1.71689°W	—	Late 18th century	Originally the coach house and stables for Stanwick Park, now demolished, and later converted for residential use, it is in rendered stone with Welsh slate roofs. The building is in two and three storeys and has ten bays. The middle two bays have three storeys and contain a semicircular coach arch with an architrave, flanked by round-arched windows, and above are two oculi, a floor band, a tripartite sash window, and a pediment with six dove holes. On the roof is a wooden cupola containing bells, with a weathervane. Flanking the centre are three bays with round-arched openings, and each end bay has a cornice and a deep parapet. Attached to the right of the house is a length of wall with two gate piers.	II
Deer Shelter; 54.50143°N 1.71910°W		Late 18th or early 19th century (probable)	The building is in stone with some brick, and has a pyramidal stone slate roof. There is a single storey and a hexagonal plan. In each wall is a segmental-arched opening in brick, some blocked, some partly blocked.	II
Kirk Bridge; 54.50208°N 1.71557°W		Late 18th to early 19th century (probable)	The bridge carries Stanwick Park Road over Mary Wild Beck. It is in stone, and consists of a single segmental arch. There is a chamfered offset below the parapet, which has segmental coping, and ends in square piers.	II
Bridge over Aldbrough Beck; 54.50782°N 1.70548°W	—	Early 19th century (probable)	The bridge, which carries a road over the stream, is sandstone. It consists of a single segmental arch of voussoirs, with a band. The parapet is coped, and is carried on balusters, rectangular apart from the middle one, which is square.	II
Former coach house west of Carlton Hall; 54.50515°N 1.70094°W	—	Early 19th century (probable)	The coach house and stables, later used as farm buildings and a cottage, are in stone with some brown brick, stepped eaves, and hipped Westmorland slate roofs. It is mainly in two storeys and has a U-shaped plan, with a central range of four bays, and projecting outer bays. The main range has four semicircular aches, the middle two with doorways under timber lintels. The outer bays have doorways in architraves with keystones. At the rear, on the left, is a single-storey cottage with sash windows.	II
Gate piers and quadrant walls to rear of Stanwick Park; 54.49814°N 1.71638°W	—	Early to mid-19th century (probable)	The rear entrance to the hall, now demolished, was flanked by two pairs of square stone gate piers. The inner piers each has a base, a cornice capital and a blocking course, and the inner piers have a projecting flange with scrolled top. Each pair of piers is linked by a short wall. The flanking quadrant walls are rendered, about 3 metres (9.8 ft) in height, with stone bases and coping, and contain interval pilaster buttresses.	II
Park House; 54.48999°N 1.70765°W		1847	A farmhouse in sandstone with Westmorland slate roofs, and in Jacobethan style. There are two storeys and a loft, and an irregular plan, with a front of three bays, the middle bay projecting and gabled. The doorway has a Tudor arch, and the windows are mullioned.	II
Well 150 metres north-north-east of St John the Baptist's Church; 54.50421°N 1.71518°W		Mid to late 19th century (probable)	The well, in a field to the north of the church, is in stone, and has a stone slate roof with a coped gable. It has a square plan, and is a small single cell with a pointed arched opening. The well drains into another well nearer the church.	II
Well 100 metres north-north-east of St John the Baptist's Church; 54.50301°N 1.71461°W		Mid to late 19th century (probable)	The well is set into the churchyard wall, it is in stone, and has a stone slate roof with moulded gable coping and a finial. It has a square plan, and is a small single cell that has a pointed arched opening with a moulded surround. At the corners are stepped diagonal buttresses, and at the rear is a vent. Inside, there is a six-sided basin with iron bars. The well is fed by a well in a field to the north.	II
