= Sir Hugh Smithson, 1st Baronet =

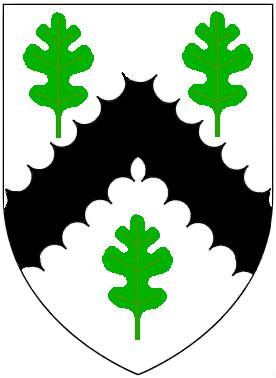
Arms of Smithson of Stanwick, Yorkshire (ancient): Argent, a chevron engrailed sable between three oak leaves erect slipped vert

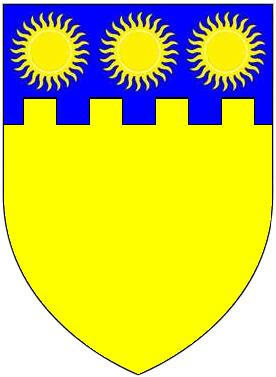
Augmented arms of Smithson Baronets of Stanwick: Or, on a chief embattled azure three suns proper

Sir Hugh Smithson, 1st Baronet (c. 1598–1670) of Stanwick St John, North Yorkshire, was a Royalist supporter during the Civil War for which he was rewarded with a baronetcy by King Charles II on the Restoration of the Monarchy in 1660. His great-great-grandson was Sir Hugh Smithson, 4th Baronet (1715-1786), who having inherited by his marriage half of the great Percy, Earl of Northumberland, estates, and the title 2nd Earl of Northumberland by special remainder from his father-in-law Algernon Seymour, 7th Duke of Somerset (d.1750), changed his surname and arms to Percy and was created in 1766 1st Duke of Northumberland.

== Origins ==
He was the son and heir of Anthony Smithson of Newsham anciently "Newsham Broghton Lith", in the Parish of Kirkby Ravensworth, North Riding of Yorkshire, by his wife Eleanor Catterick, daughter and heir of George Catterick of Stanwick.

== Career ==
In 1638 he purchased the manor of Stanwick from his relative Anthony Catterick for the sum of £4000. He was a Citizen of the City of London, a member of the Worshipful Company of Haberdashers and "an adventurer in Irish lands".

According to Collins:

"(He) eminently distinguished himself for his zeal and loyalty to his sovereign Charles II in whose service he liberally employed his fortune, seeking all occasions to promote his majesty's interest during his exile, for which he was at length no small sufferer, having his estate sequestered as a recusant after being twice fined for refusing to act as sheriff to avoid taking the oaths imposed in those days of rebellion".

He was fined for recusancy by the Committee for Compounding with Delinquents.

== Grant of augmented arms ==
As a further token of the king's gratitude, in order to distinguish him from the rest of his family, he was granted the honour of a different coat of arms: Or, on a chief embattled azure three suns proper.

== Landholdings ==
His landholdings included:

- Stanwick St John, Yorkshire
- Airmyn (anciently "Armin"), East Riding of Yorkshire
- Tottenham Cross in Middlesex. The site of his mansion is thought to be where stands today a terrace of houses called Northumberland Terrace, built by Robert Plimpton in 1752 "built on land where previously stood some medieval mansions, one of which was called Percy House". The magnificent baroque gate piers and railings of Percy House survive.
- Estates in Suffolk.

== Marriage and children ==
He married Dorothy Rawstorne (alias Royston), daughter of Jerom Rawstorne of Plaistow in Essex. The will proved on 22 Nov. 1658 of "Jeramy Rawstorne" of London, a member of the Worshipful Company of Merchant Taylors survives in the Lancashire Archives (the family was also of New Hall, Preston Lancashire) summarised as follows:

"To be buried at St. Lawrence Jury, near his father Jeremy. To sisters Elizabeth Baxter, Dorothy Smithson, Leah Shippard, and to cousin Hester Rawstorne £5 each. To brothers Heugh Smithson, Mathew Shippare, Robert Bardard, and to uncle Richard Halford and aunt Anne Harrise, and aunt Mary Younge £2 each. To Elizabeth and Grace daughters of brother Francis, decd. £20 each, etc."

By his wife he had four sons and two daughters, of which only three survived him:

- Sir Jerome Smithson, 2nd Baronet (d.1684), eldest son and heir, married Mary Wingate, daughter and heiress of Edward Wingate (c.1606-1685) of Lockley's Hall in Hertfordshire, MP for St Albans 1640-42.
- Hugh Smithson, 2nd son, who inherited his father's Suffolk estates, a haberdasher of Old Exchange Precincts in the City of London, who married Mrs Alice Yeane, by whom he had one daughter Anne Smithson, married to Sir Henry Johnson (c.1659-1719) of Bradenham in Buckinghamshire, Blackwall in Middlesex and Friston in Suffolk, several times MP for Aldeburgh in Suffolk, 'the greatest shipbuilder and shipowner of his day', who had by her an only daughter Anne Johnson, the wife of Thomas Wentworth, 1st Earl of Strafford (1672-1739), KG, First Lord of the Admiralty.
- Anthony Smithson (d.1688), 3rd son, a barrister at Gray’s Inn who inherited his father's estates at Tottenham Cross in Middlesex and at Armin in Yorkshire. He married Susanna Barkham, daughter of Sir Edward Barkham, 1st Baronet (1591-1667), MP, of South Acre in Norfolk, by whom he had one son Hugh Smithson (1661-1740) of Tottenham in Middlesex, several times MP for Middlesex, who inherited estates worth £3,000 p.a. in Middlesex and Yorkshire. He married firstly Hester Godfrey, daughter of Michael Godfrey of Woodford in Essex, by whom he had 7 children who all died unmarried. He married secondly Constantia Hare, only daughter of Henry Hare, 2nd Baron Coleraine (1636–1708), without children. His heir was his cousin Sir Hugh Smithson, 4th Baronet, later 1st Duke of Northumberland.

== Death and burial ==
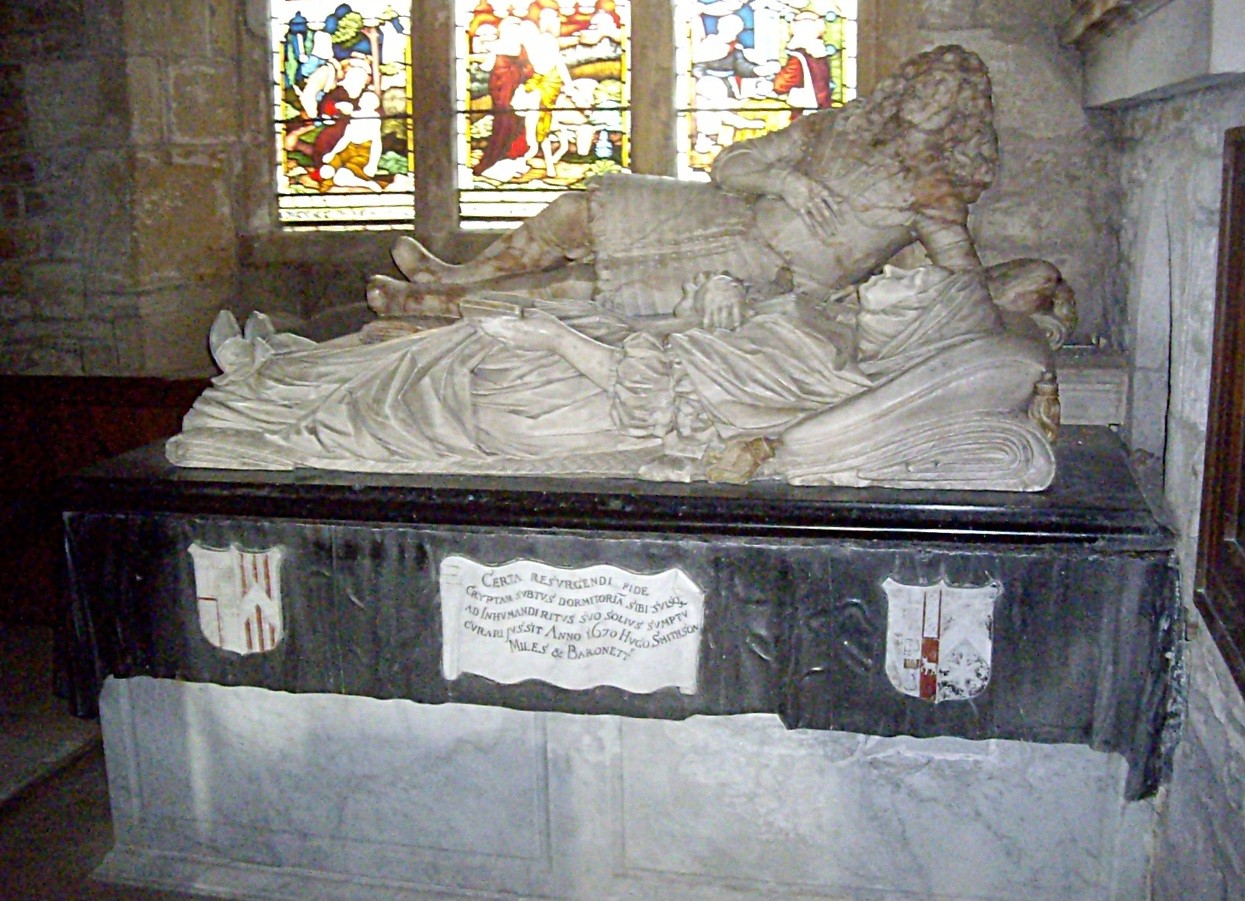
Monument and effigies of Sir Hugh Smithson, 1st Baronet (d.1670) and his wife, St John the Baptist's Church, Stanwick

He died on 21 October 1670, aged 72, at his home at Tottenham High Cross (which formerly belonged to the Hynningham family), Middlesex, and was buried in his parish church of St John the Baptist, Stanwick St John, where survives his elaborate monument showing two effigies, of himself and his wife, probably sculpted by William Stanton (1639–1705) of London. It displays the following inscription:

Certa resurgendi fide cryptam subtus dormitoria sibi sulso(?) ad inhumandi ritus suo solius sumptu curari jussit Anno 1670 Hugo Smithson Miles et Baronett ("In certain faith of rising again, in the year 1670 Hugh Smithson, Knight and Baronet, ordered to be undertaken at his sole expense the rite of burial in the crypt below as his dormitory").

== Sources ==
- Collins, Arthur, The English Baronetage, Vol.3, Part 1, pp. 126–8

Baronetage of England
| New creation | Baronet (of Stanwick); 1660–1670 | Succeeded by Jerome Smithson |
