= East Layton =

Village and civil parish in North Yorkshire, England

Coordinates: 54°29′03″N 1°45′01″W

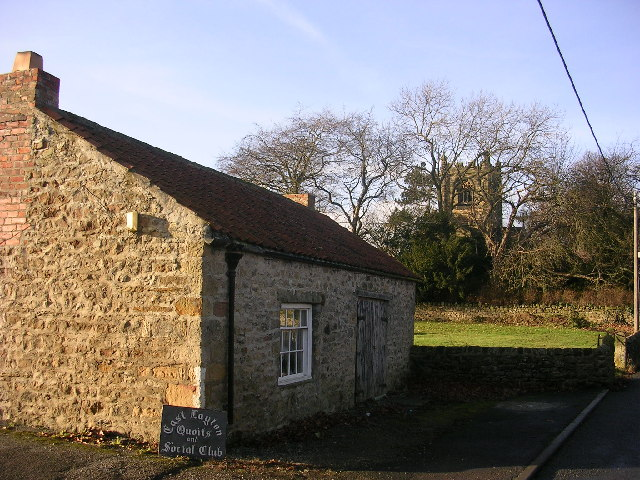
- East Layton Quoits and Social Club

- Location within North Yorkshire
- Population: 117 (Including West Layton. 2011)
- OS grid reference: NZ163100
- Unitary authority: North Yorkshire
- Ceremonial county: North Yorkshire
- Region: Yorkshire and the Humber
- Country: England
- Sovereign state: United Kingdom
- Post town: Richmond
- Postcode district: DL11
- Police: North Yorkshire
- Fire: North Yorkshire
- Ambulance: Yorkshire
- UK Parliament: Richmond and Northallerton

East Layton is a village and civil parish in the county of North Yorkshire, England, close to the border with County Durham and a few miles west of Darlington.

From 1974 to 2023 it was part of the district of Richmondshire, it is now administered by the unitary North Yorkshire Council.

The racehorse Crisp is interred there.

== Demographics ==
East Layton, considered a parish, is situated a few miles west of the town of Darlington. In the 1870s, East Layton was described as

"township, Stan wick and Melsonby pars., North-Riding Yorkshire, 5½ miles N. of Richmond, 1072 ac., pop. 156. " by John Bartholomew.

Today, East Layton has a population of 117, according to the 2011 census.

Population of East Layton, 1881–2011

== History ==
=== Etymology ===
The name Layton derives from the Old English lēactūn meaning 'settlement where leek is grown'.

=== Church ===
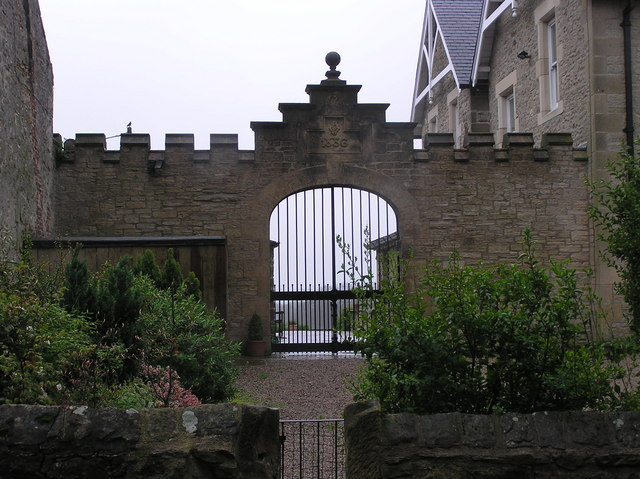
Gate adjoining the old parsonge of Christ Church, East Layton

The parish is home to Christ Church, East Layton, a grade II building which was constructed in 1895.

=== East Layton Hall ===
East Layton Hall is a Grade II listed building. The manor house and attached garden date back to around 1623. The North Yorkshire Cleveland Vernacular Buildings study group report records have shown that in the late 19th century, the building was an inn, called the Layton Arms. Although the internal of the building has not been inspected, English Heritage have noted that there is a chamfered basket-arched fireplace with two chimneys at the north end of the building. East Layton Hall was registered as a Grade II listed building on 4 February 1969. Location; 3 Forcett Close, East Layton, North Yorkshire, DL11 7PG.

=== Racehorse "Crisp" ===
In the history of horse racing, dubbed the 'most unlucky horse', "Crisp" was laid to rest in East Layton. He died after an accident hunting, and was buried at the entrance of the owner, Sir Chester Manifold's estate in East Layton. Sir Chester Manifold was an Australian politician and philanthropist. Crisp was in the running to win the 1973 Grand National, but tired out quickly in the last stretch, being beaten by a three quarters of a length. However, despite a defeat, Crisp had outrun the Grand National completion time, by a full 20 seconds, deservedly gaining a place in the history books.

== Employment ==
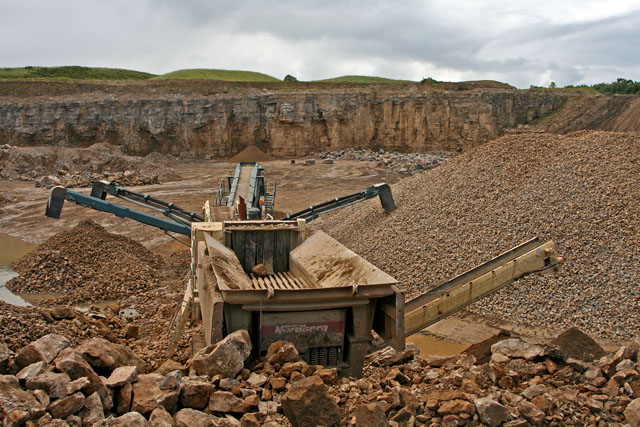
Quarrying limestone, Forcett Quarry, north of East Layton

The biggest employer within East Layton and for other surrounding areas, was the mineral extraction site which has been in East Layton since the 1800s and is now owned and managed by Hanson Aggregates. Forcett Quarry lies north-west of the village of East Layton, with residential properties situated 220 yards (200 m) from the quarry perimeter. It was originally owned by Tilcon (North) Ltd, and was acquired by Hanson Quarry Products Europe in September 2000. With an original extension of the site in 1993, to alter the entrance of the quarry to the west of East Layton village, to prevent disturbance to the village and its inhabitants. A further extension plan was submitted to the Richmondshire Planning Council in 2007, of which was declined by the council due to objections from local residents, with concerns of noise and property damage from blasts.

Historically, the area was known for it copper deposits which were mined and quarried in the 18th and 19th-centuries.

== See also ==
- Listed buildings in East Layton
