= Smithson baronets =

Title in the Baronetage of England

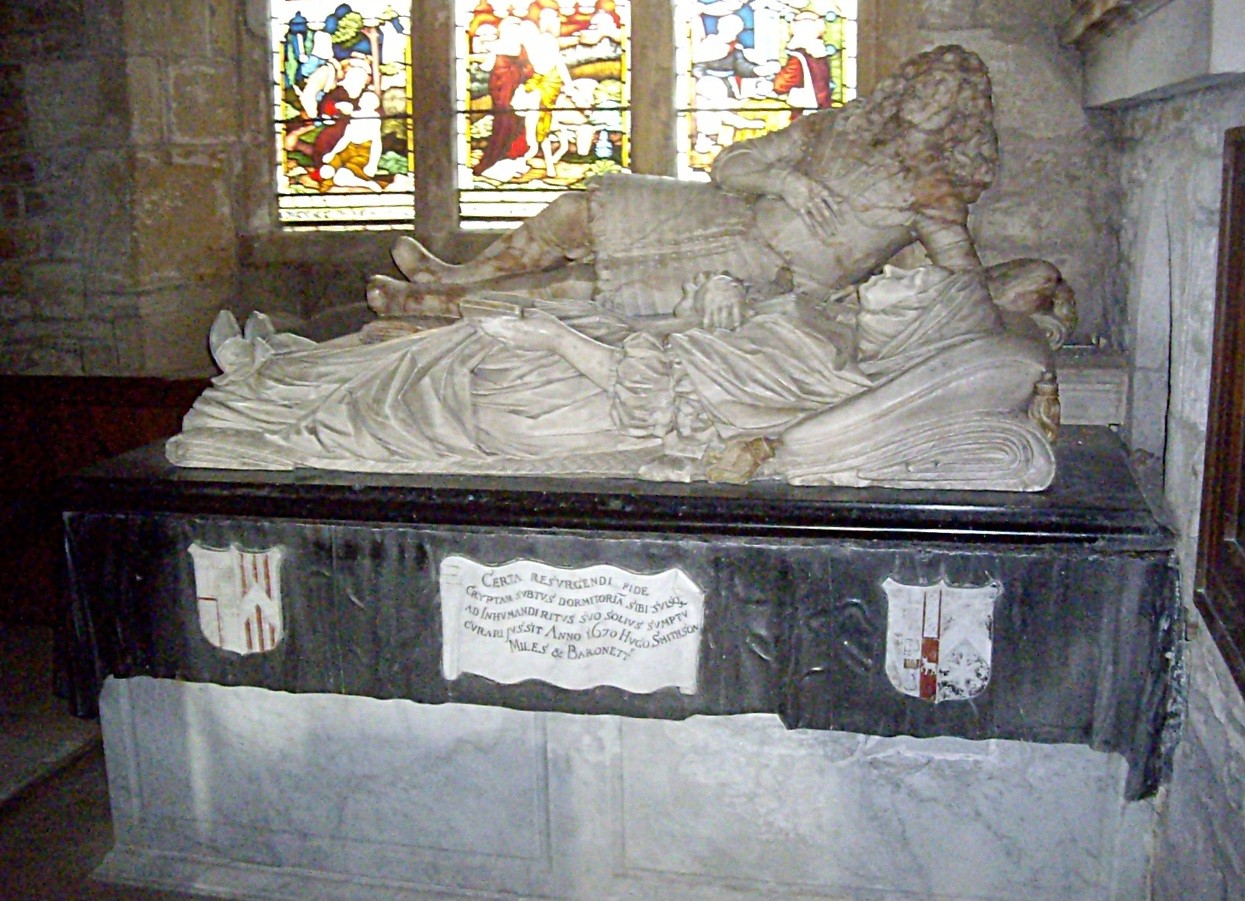
Monument of Sir Hugh Smithson, 1st Baronet, St John the Baptist's Church, Stanwick

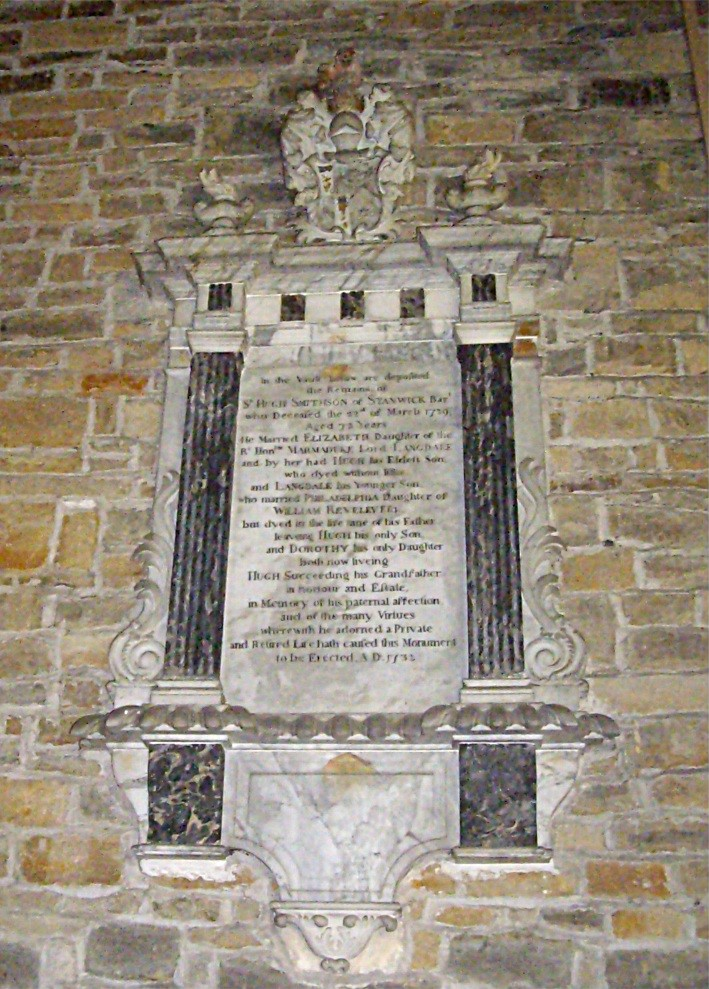
Mural monument to Sir Hugh Smithson, 3rd Baronet, St John the Baptist, Stanwick

The Smithson Baronetcy, of Stanwick in the County of York, is a title in the Baronetage of England. It was created on 2 August 1660 for Hugh Smithson (1598-1670) of Stanwick St John, Yorkshire. Sir Hugh Smithson, 3rd Baronet, married Elizabeth Langdale, daughter of Marmaduke Langdale, Baron Langdale. Sir Hugh Smithson, the fourth Baronet, married Lady Elizabeth Seymour, daughter of Algernon Seymour, 7th Duke of Somerset and heiress of the Percy family, Earls of Northumberland. In 1749 the Duke of Somerset was created Earl of Northumberland, with remainder to his son-in-law Sir Hugh Smithson, who succeeded as second Earl on his father-in-law's death in 1750. He assumed the surname of Percy and was created Duke of Northumberland in 1766. The baronetcy remains merged with the dukedom.

Smithsonian Institution in Washington DC was founded with the legacy of James Smithson, illegitimate son of Sir Hugh, 4th Baronet (Hugh Percy, 1st Duke of Northumberland).

== Smithson baronets of Stanwick (1660) ==
- Sir Hugh Smithson, 1st Baronet (c. 1598–1670)
- Sir Jerome Smithson, 2nd Baronet (c. 1630–1684)
- Sir Hugh Smithson, 3rd Baronet (1657–1729)
  - Langdale Smithson
- Sir Hugh Smithson (later Percy), 4th Baronet (c.1714–1786) (succeeded as Earl of Northumberland in 1750 and created Duke of Northumberland in 1766)

For further succession, see Duke of Northumberland.

== Arms ==
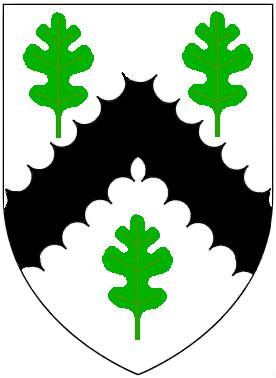
Smithson of Stanwick, Yorkshire (ancient)

The Arms of Smithson of Stanwick, Yorkshire (ancient) are blazoned Argent, a chevron engrailed sable between three oak leaves erect slipped vert

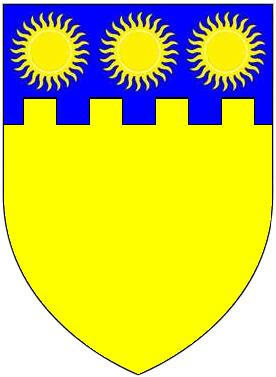
Augmented arms of Smithson of Stanwick

The arms of the Smithson baronets of Stanwick are Or, on a chief embattled azure three suns proper.

== See also ==
- Earl of Northumberland
- Duke of Northumberland
- Duke of Somerset
