= Stanwick St John =

Village and civil parish in North Yorkshire, England

Coordinates: 54.505659°N 1.706614°W

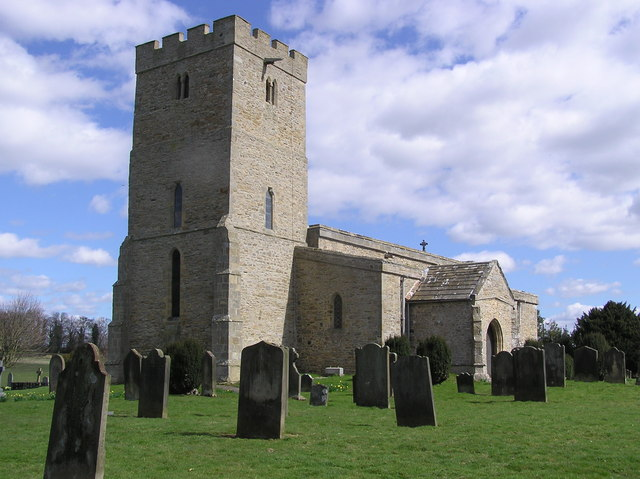
- Church of St John the Baptist, Stanwick St John

- Location within North Yorkshire
- Population: 143 (2011)
- Unitary authority: North Yorkshire
- Ceremonial county: North Yorkshire
- Region: Yorkshire and the Humber
- Country: England
- Sovereign state: United Kingdom
- Post town: Richmond
- Postcode district: DL11
- Police: North Yorkshire
- Fire: North Yorkshire
- Ambulance: Yorkshire

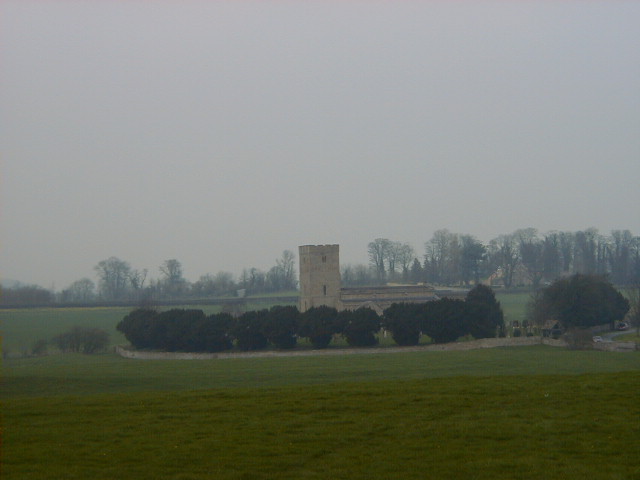
Church of St John the Baptist set within its ancient circular churchyard

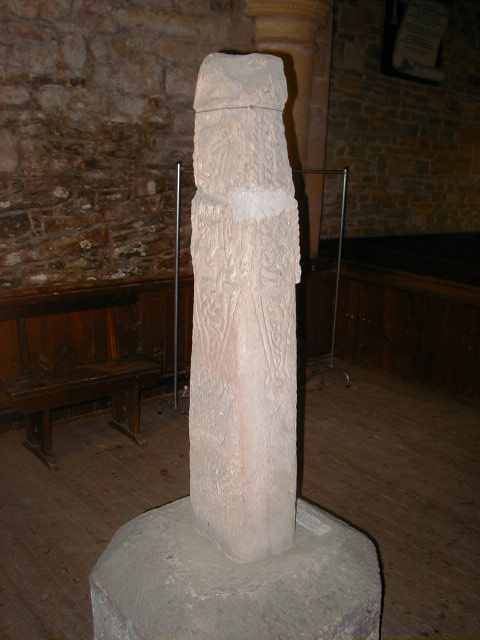
Remains of a 9th-century cross-shaft, now located in the church tower

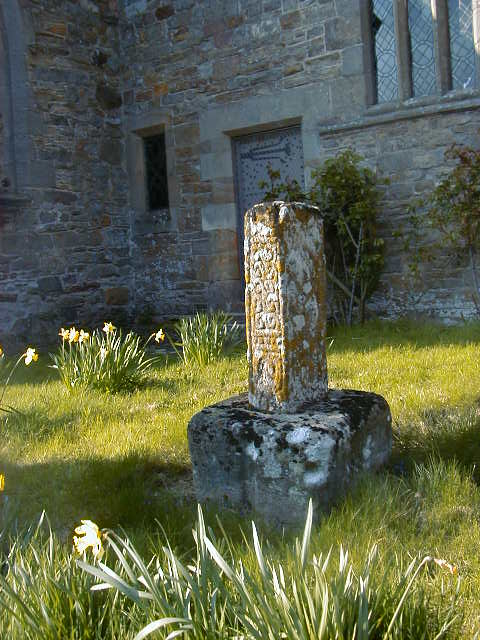
Probable remains of a cross-shaft, located in the churchyard

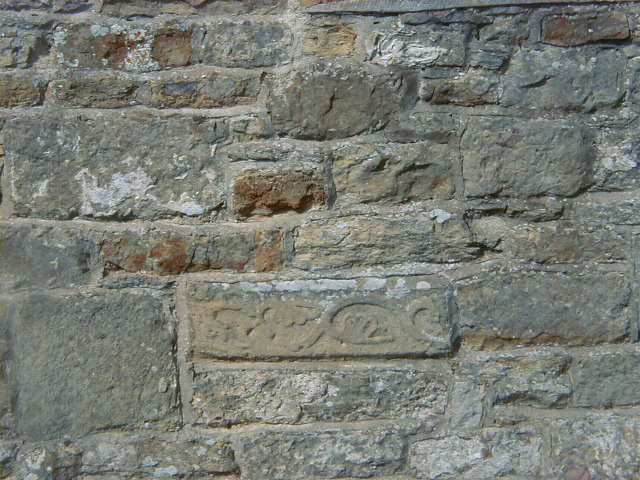
One of at least two pre-Norman carved stones re-set into the exterior walls of the church

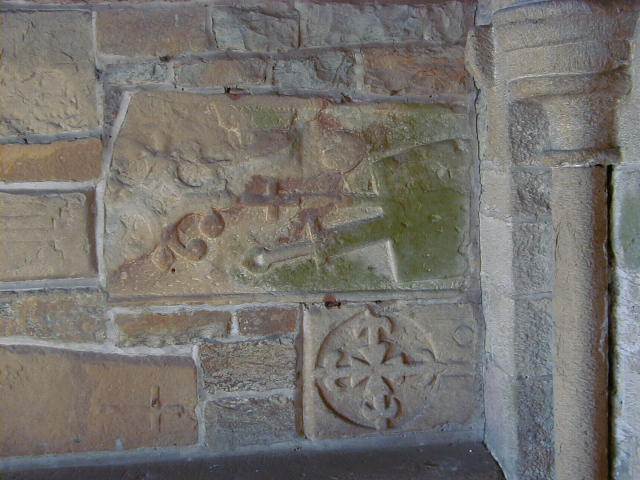
Carved and coloured stones re-set into the interior entrance walls of the church

Stanwick St John is a village, civil parish, former manor and ecclesiastical parish in the county of North Yorkshire, (formerly "North Riding" of Yorkshire), England. It is situated between the towns of Darlington and Richmond, close to Scotch Corner and the remains of the Roman fort and bridge at Piercebridge.

From 1974 to 2023 it was part of the district of Richmondshire, it is now administered by the unitary North Yorkshire Council.

== Nomenclature ==
The name 'Stanwick' is thought to be derived from the Old Norse word 'steinvegges', meaning "stone ways". It has been established that in 1225, Stanwick was known as 'Steinweg'; a document of that date concerning a dispute over church revenue, which led to the church being attacked and the vicar barricading himself inside, refers to "murder, fire and sacrilege within the church at Steinweg".

== Church of St John the Baptist ==
Not much remains of the once thriving settlement at Stanwick except the Church of St John the Baptist, the parish church, which dates from the 13th century, although large sections of it were rebuilt during a major restoration in 1867–8, to the designs of the architect Anthony Salvin's, under the auspices of the lady of the manor the Dowager Duchess of Northumberland who lived at the now demolished manor house of Stanwick Park. The remains of a 9th-century cross-shaft in the tower and a number of carved stones set into the walls suggest that an earlier building may have occupied the site. Its location within an unusual circular churchyard also hints at a possible pre-Norman Conquest burial ground. The church has not been used for regular services since 1990, but remains consecrated. By 1763 the Royal Arms had been painted above the Chancel (at a cost of £5), the church floor had been flagged, and new pews and a gallery under the tower built.

== Stanwick Iron Age Fortifications ==
Completely surrounding the village of Stanwick St John are the Stanwick Iron Age Fortifications, a huge Iron Age hill fort system comprising six miles (10 km) of ditches and ramparts enclosing over 700 acres (2.8 km^{2}) of land. These massive fortifications are believed to have enclosed the ancient fort of Rigodunum, the capital of Brigantia and possible seat of Cartimandua, Queen of the Brigantes, or of Venutius her rival and former husband.

== History ==
=== Early Period ===
Traces of early human occupation of the ancient site now known as Stanwick Camp are obviously apparent: the snaking dykes enclose a roughly triangular area of 300 hectares (740 acres) with an internal defensible sector, now a meadow known as "The Tofts" south of the church. Excavations in 1951 by Mortimer Wheeler and during the 1980s by Haselgrove, revealed traces of round houses both within the Tofts and outside the larger enclosed area. This suggests that from about 200 BC agrarian settlers began to establish what became the largest oppidum in the north of England. Traces of Samian ware and other rich goods in one of the round-house remains suggest that Cartimandua, Queen of the Brigantes, may have made it her residence, possibly only temporarily. According to Tacitus she made a pact with the rapidly advancing Romans under Petillius Cerealis. Rigodonum, a Brigantian fort of unknown location mentioned by Tacitus, was proposed by Wheeler as a likely candidate to have occupied the location now known as Stanwick. There are no signs in the archaeological record of battle having occurred here. The Romans established stations at Catterick to the south and at Piercebridge on the river crossing to the north but at about the same time (circa 70 AD) building activity seems to have stopped at Stanwick. Another contemporary walled ditch called "Scots Dyke" running from Stanwick southward to the River Swale at Richmond (and possibly also northward over the River Tees at Gainford, County Durham) may have formed part of a general defensive mechanism for the hill peoples in the area. A section of the defences was recreated by Wheeler (now an English Heritage visitor site near the village of Forcett) which shows how the ditch was at this point actually cut down into the sandstone to form a wall on the inner side. However, the long perimeter of the site (more than 3.7 miles [6 km]) suggests that defence against a strong attack would hardly have been an option.

Finds from the "Stanwick Hoard" discovered in 1854 are displayed in the British Museum in London.

=== Post-Roman ===
While Stanwick was never an important settlement after the Romans built and marched up what is now called Dere Street, from Catterick fort towards their river crossing at Piercebridge, it seems that the centre of the area below the Tofts, with its watermeadows, stream and pasture, which became built up into the circular, sacred island-like site visible today, provided a place for Christian worship and a burial ground as early as 500 AD. Traces of a small Iron Age village have been identified a little to the north-east of the church, and particularly in wet conditions early cultivation patterns are clearly visible in all the surrounding fields. Some very early carved stones with Viking ornamentation are visible set into the walls of the chancel and the porch, and an Anglo-Saxon cross-shaft with Celtic scrollwork stands in the church.

=== Descent of the manor ===
==== Tor the Saxon ====
As recorded in the Domesday Book of 1086, before 1066 "one Tor held 3 carucates of land here at Stanwegge".

==== Knights Templar and Hospitaller ====
It became Stanwigs and then Stanwick, probably derived from 'stone walls'. By 1275 the Knights Templar took over the settlement, followed before 1348 by the Knights Hospitaller.

==== de Catterick ====
Before 1400 it was acquired by the de Catterick or Catherick family, lords of the manor of nearby Catterick, the village of which, with its Roman remains, lies some five miles (8 km) to the south. They built the manor house known as the "Old Hall", which is still in use, opposite the church in which survives the monumental brass of Elizabeth Catherick (died 1591).

==== Smithson / Percy ====
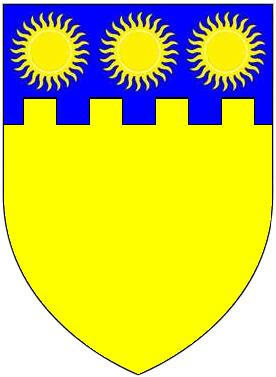
Augmented arms of Smithson Baronets of Stanwick: Or, on a chief embattled azure three suns proper. The ancient arms of the Smithsons were: Argent, a chevron engrailed sable between three oak leaves erect slipped vert

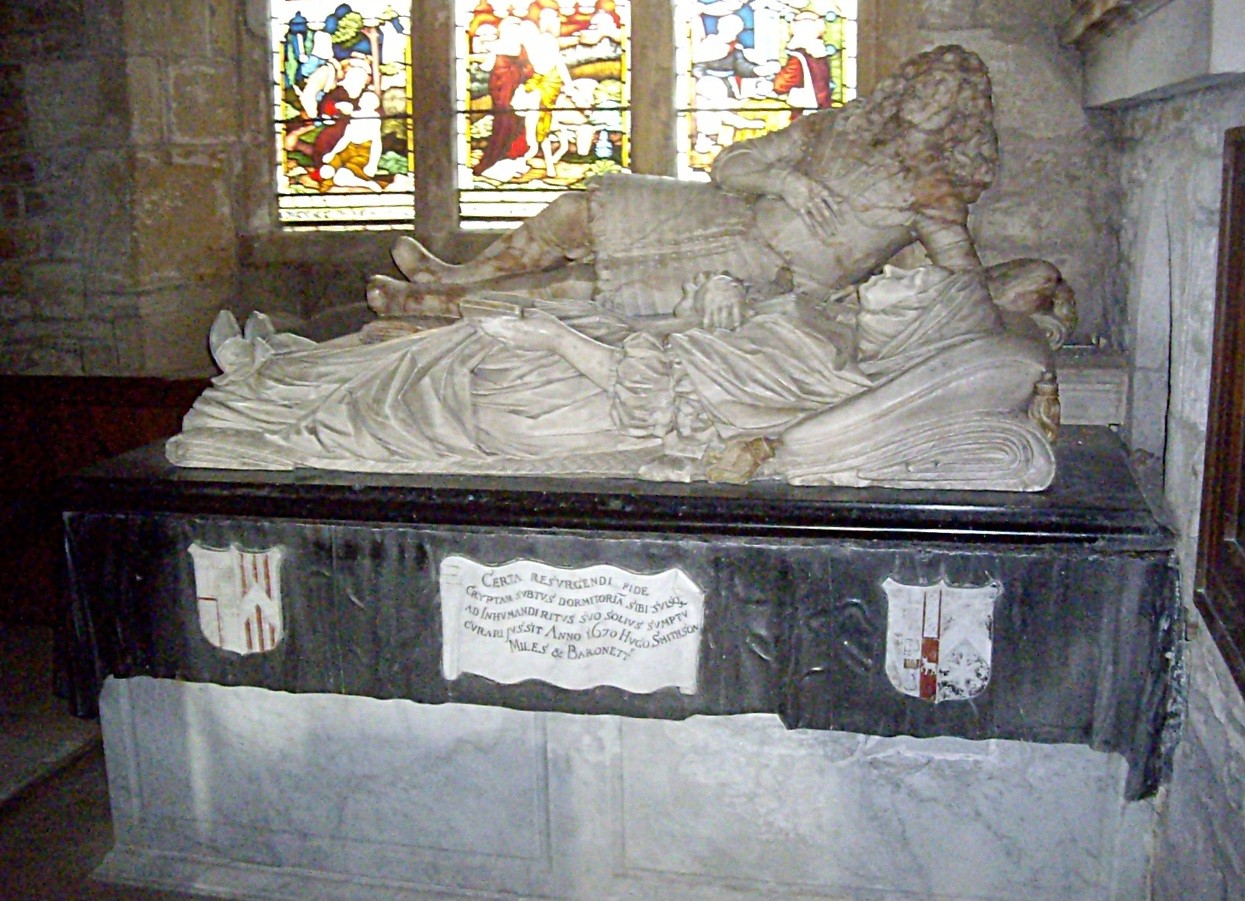
Monument and effigies of Sir Hugh Smithson, 1st Baronet (died 1670) and his wife, St John the Baptist's Church, Stanwick. Sculpted by (William) Stanton of London. Inscription: :Certa resurgendi fide cryptam subtus dormitoria sibi sulso(?) ad inhumandi ritus suo solius sumptu curari jussit Anno 1670 Hugo Smithson Miles et Baronett ("In certain faith of rising again, in the year 1670 Hugh Smithson, Knight and Baronet, ordered to be undertaken at his sole expense the rite of burial in the crypt below as his dormitory")

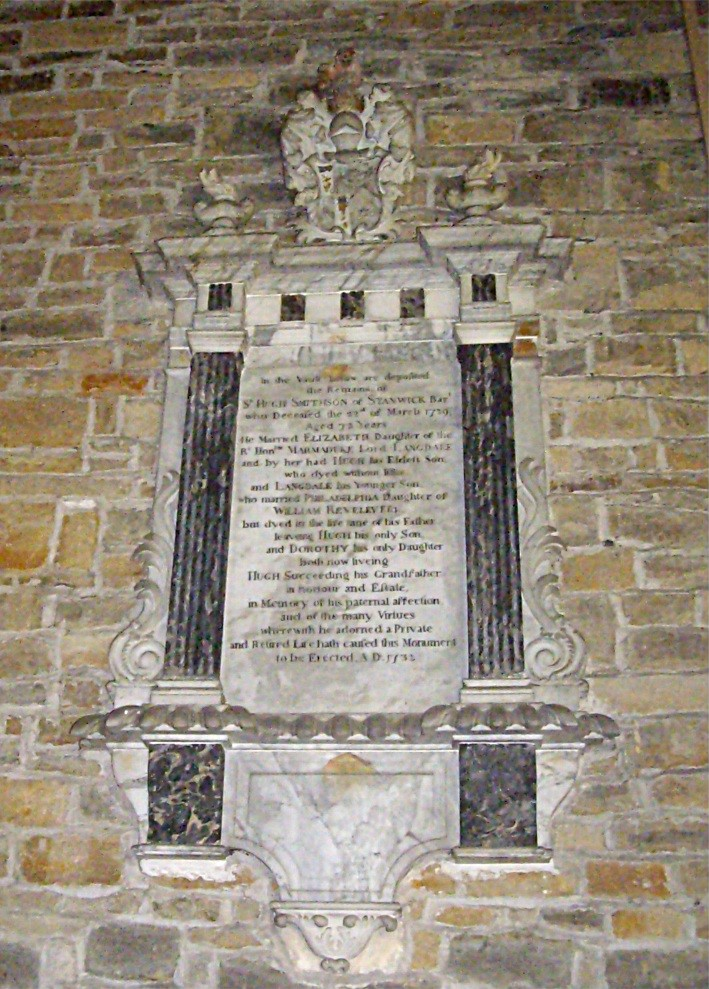
Mural monument to Sir Hugh Smithson, 3rd Baronet (1657–1729), who married Elizabeth Langdale, daughter of Marmaduke Langdale, 2nd Baron Langdale, Church of St John the Baptist, Stanwick

===== Hugh Smithson, 1st Baronet (1598–1670) =====
In 1638 Anthony Catterick sold the manor of Stanwick for the sum of £4000 to his relative Hugh Smithson (1598–1670), created a baronet at the Restoration of the Monarchy in 1660, a Citizen of the City of London and member of the Worshipful Company of Haberdashers, whose mother was Eleanor Catterick, daughter and heir of George Catterick of Stanwick, wife of Anthony Smithson of Newsham anciently "Newsham Broghton Lith", in the Parish of Kirby Ravensworth, North Riding of Yorkshire. His grandfather had lived at Stanwick, so he was coming home. The manor was then 600 acres (about 250 hectares) and included four dwelling houses and six cottages. He married Dorothy Rawstorne (alias Royston), daughter of Jerom Rawstorne of Plaistow in Essex. The will proved on 22 November 1658 of "Jeramy Rawstorne" of London, a member of the Worshipful Company of Merchant Taylors survives in the Lancashire Archives (the family was also of New Hall, Preston Lancashire) summarised as follows:

"To be buried at St. Lawrence Jury, near his father Jeremy. To sisters Elizabeth Baxter, Dorothy Smithson, Leah Shippard, and to cousin Hester Rawstorne £5 each. To brothers Heugh Smithson, Mathew Shippare, Robert Bardard, and to uncle Richard Halford and aunt Anne Harrise, and aunt Mary Younge £2 each. To Elizabeth and Grace daughters of brother Francis, decd. £20 each, etc."

===== Sir Jerome Smithson, 2nd Baronet (c. 1630 – 1684) =====
Sir Jerome Smithson, 2nd Baronet (c. 1630 – 1684), son and heir, who married Mary Wingate, daughter and heiress of .... Wingate of Yorkshire.

===== Sir Hugh Smithson, 3rd Baronet (1657–1729) =====
Sir Hugh Smithson, 3rd Baronet (1657–1729), who married Elizabeth Langdale, a daughter of Marmaduke Langdale, 2nd Baron Langdale (1661–1703) of Holme in Yorkshire. His mural monument survives in Stanwick Church. He had two sons, who both predeceased him and four daughters, all nuns.

===== Sir Hugh Smithson, 4th Baronet (c. 1714 – 1786) =====
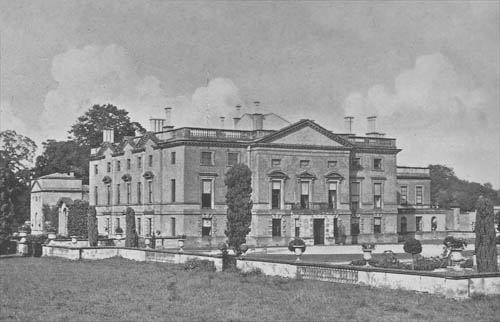
Stanwick Hall, as rebuilt by Hugh Smithson (alias Percy), demolished 1923

Sir Hugh Smithson, 4th Baronet (c. 1714 – 1786), grandson, only son of Langdale Smithson (2nd son of the 3rd Baronet) by his wife Philadelphia Reveley (whose portrait by Sir Godfrey Kneller survives), daughter of William Reveley of Newby Wiske, Yorkshire. He married Lady Elizabeth Seymour, the daughter and co-heir of Algernon Seymour, 7th Duke of Somerset (1684–1750) of Petworth House in Sussex, whose mother had been Lady Elizabeth Percy (1667–1722), the great heiress of the last Earl of Northumberland. Smithson inherited about half of the former Percy estates, includinhg Alnwick Castle in Northumberland and Syon House in Middlesex, and inherited his father-in-law's subsidiary title of Earl of Northumberland, created for him in 1749 with special remainder to Smithson, in anticipation of the Duke's death without a son and the passing of the Dukedom of Somerset to very distant Seymour cousins in Devon. In conformity with the Duke's wishes, Smithson adopted the surname Percy in lieu of his patronymic and adopted the Percy armorials. In 1766 he was created Duke of Northumberland.

Despite the fact that the principal seat of Smithson, now 1st Duke of Northumberland, was at Alnwick Castle, sixty miles to the north, and that he had inherited other huge estates from his marriage, he was fond of his paternal seat of Stanwick and started to build a splendid new mansion called Stanwick Hall, half a mile to the south of the church, which he intended as a country retreat. The beck was bridged and a carriage drive was constructed to link with the neighbouring village of Aldbrough and Dere Street. The new Hall included a splendid summerhouse and was set in a deer park, as depicted in an oil painting now at Syon House by George Cuitt the Elder (1743–1818), born at nearby Moulton.

===== Algernon Percy, 4th Duke of Northumberland (1792–1865) =====
Stanwick became the seat of Algernon Percy, Lord Prudhoe (1792–1865), the second son of the 2nd Duke, who later became the 4th Duke in 1847. Between 1839 and 1842 he extended Stanwick, to the designs of Decimus Burton (1800–1881), which included the addition of north and east wings and improvement to the stables. In the 19th century new gardens were laid out, including an Italian-style sunken garden with fountain immediately south of the entrance; a splendid 1-acre (4,000 m^{2}) French walled garden (supposedly designed by an émigré French priest escaping the French Revolution), and a 2-acre (0.81 ha) walled kitchen garden further to the east.

In 1842 Algernon Percy, Lord Prudhoe (1792–1865) married Lady Eleanor Grosvenor, daughter of Richard Grosvenor, 2nd Marquess of Westminster, and more alterations began at Stanwick Hall. Perhaps at this time the icehouse was sunk in the Tofts to the south-west of the church, with a handsome ornamental 'Deer Shelter' on top. He was a naval officer, explorer and social innovator, and expanded enormously his estates with revenue from coal mines and the railways. He was buried with much pomp in Westminster Abbey in 1865, having bequeathed a life-interest in the estate to his distraught and childless widow, who took up residence there six months after his death. The Darlington and Stockton Times reported her arrival as follows:

Her Grace arrived at Bank Top (railway station) on the Scotch Express at 4.15, which for her special service stopped in the centre of the station, in order that she might quietly alight. That train usually merely rests at Darlington to take in water, and no passengers are either booked from or to that place. Her grace was attired in the deepest weeds, and wore a plain widower’s cap. She drove off to Stanwick in her brougham with a single pair of horses, and was received at her favourite home, which will be her future country residence, with the respectful and silent greeting of her tenants in the quietest and most unostentatious manner possible.

She did not pause; soon the church was rebuilt from its parlous condition, to the designs of Anthony Salvin, with many of the ancient stones from the older building and tombs being set in its walls and porch. A new Vicarage was built to the north and was presented with a portrait of the late Duke; lodges and stout residences for her butler and head gardener were added. In 1891 she commissioned a new church dedicated to St Paul to be built in the nearby village of Aldbrough St John, which manor was largely owned by the Dukes and traditionally had been the source of workers and services for the estate. An interesting record of Stanwick Hall and its estate was made in the February 1900 edition of the magazine Country Life Illustrated', which featured a lavishly illustrated article entitled 'Stanwick Park, Yorkshire – the seat of Eleanor, Duchess of Northumberland". It included seven photographs of the house and gardens with statuary and ornamental ironwork. Only one of the photographs shows a person, namely Mr William Higgie, her head gardener, employed in 1866 and who remained in her service until shortly after her death in 1911.

The Dowager Duchess Eleanor lived to the age of 90, spending about half the year at Stanwick, when she saw to the spiritual needs of the community, reducing the number of pubs to one, supporting the school and dispensing charity to the deserving.

After her death in 1911 the house was rarely used by the family, and served briefly as a hospital for wounded soldiers from the First World War. With the severe imposition of death duties after that war the upkeep of the house and grounds became uneconomic and in 1923 the then Duke put the estate up for sale. The farms and land found buyers but the mansion house did not and was demolished. Most of the ancillary buildings were however sold: the kitchen garden became a commercial enterprise and the cottages and outbuildings were converted into modern dwellings. The result was a small nuclear village of about ten houses which has since expanded slightly but still remains within the original estate boundaries.

The neighbouring estate of Carlton, half a mile to the north-east, had been subsumed by Stanwick Hall early in the nineteenth century and had served as the residence of the head estate manager, for stables and kennels and for associated staff accommodation. Its fate echoed that of Stanwick: the Hall was demolished by fire and is now similarly represented by a group of refurbished buildings, including icehouse and walled gardens. The only original dwellings are the gamekeeper's and kennelman's.

== See also ==
- Listed buildings in Stanwick St John
