= St Cuthbert's Church, Forcett =

Church building in Forcett, North Yorkshire, England

Coordinates: 54.5052°N 1.7303°W

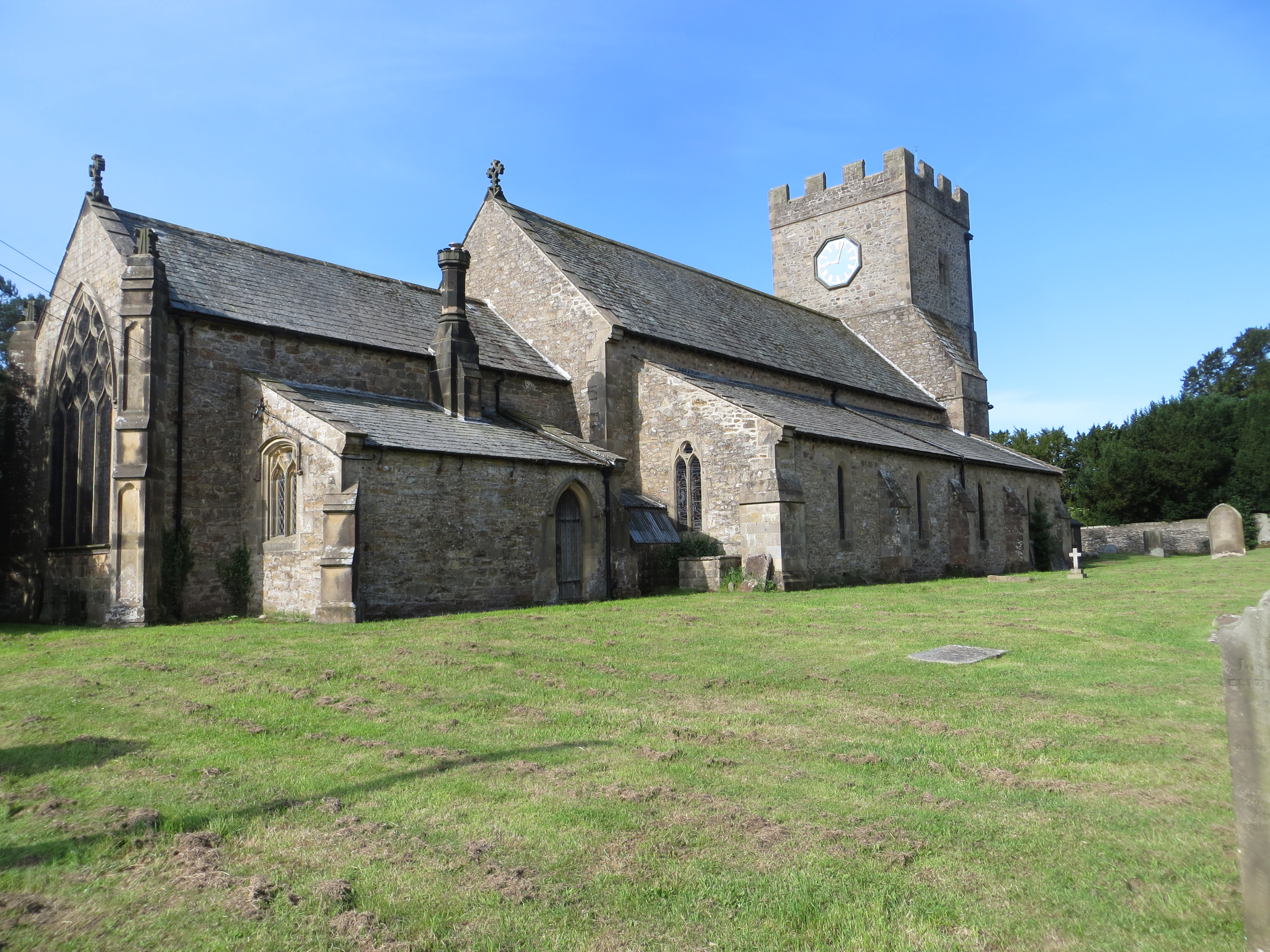
The church, in 2015

St Cuthbert's Church is the parish church of Forcett, a village in North Yorkshire, in England.

The church was originally built about 1130. It was altered in the 13th century, from which period much of the walls date, and there were further changes in the 15th century. It was largely rebuilt between 1857 and 1859, and was grade II listed in 1987.

It is built in sandstone with a Westmorland slate roof, and consists of a nave, a north aisle, a south porch, a chancel with a north vestry, and a west tower. The tower has four stages, a plinth, quoins, a square stair turret to the northeast, a lancet window with a hood mould, two-light bell openings, a clock face on the east side, and an embattled parapet. The porch is gabled and contains a round-headed doorway with waterleaf capitals to the shafts and an inner round-headed doorway with two orders, Incorporated into the porch are Anglo-Saxon and medieval carved stones.

== See also ==
- Listed buildings in Forcett
