= Forcett Hall =

English country house in Forcett, North Yorkshire, England

Coordinates: 54°30′23″N 1°44′9″W

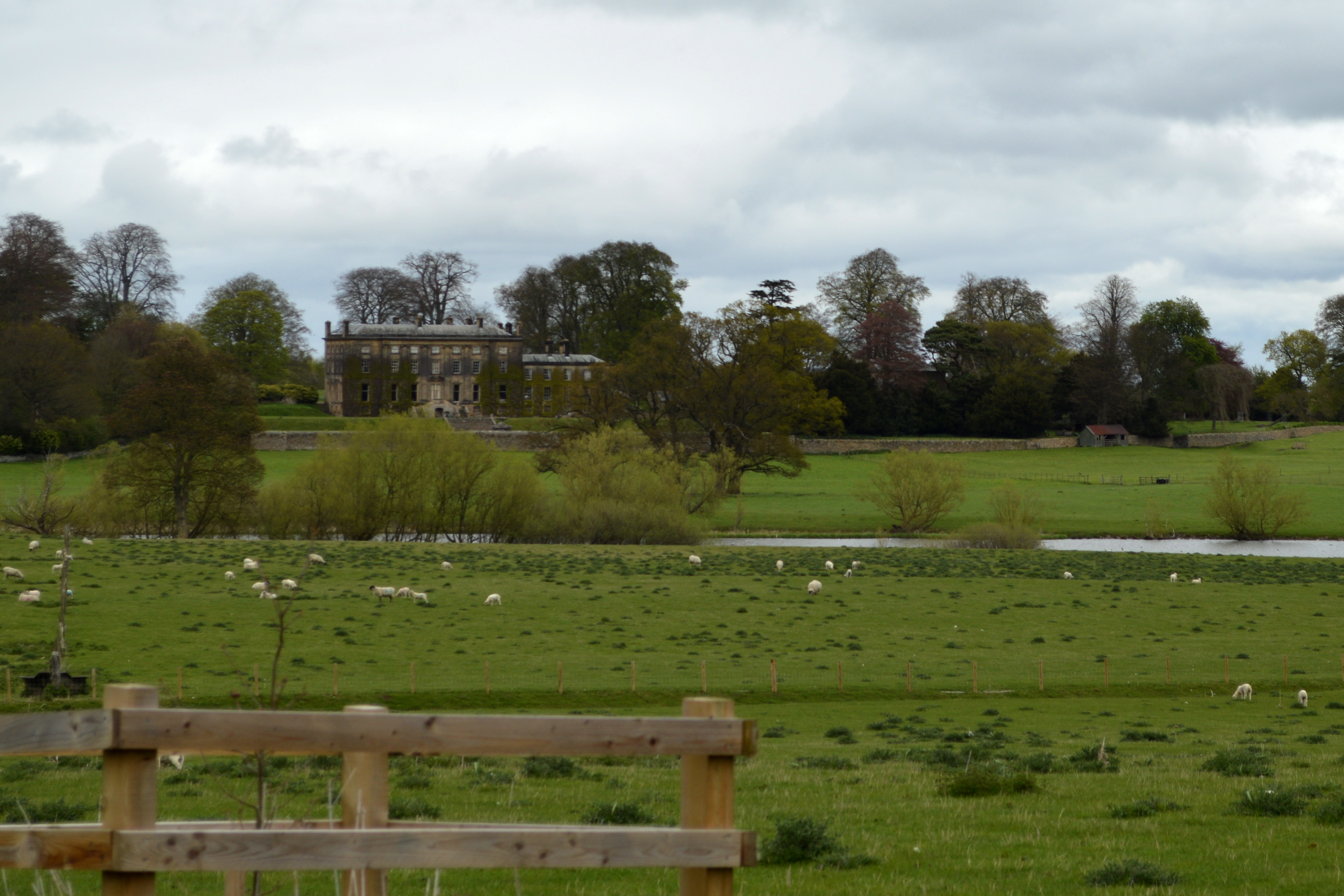
Forcett Hall (2015)

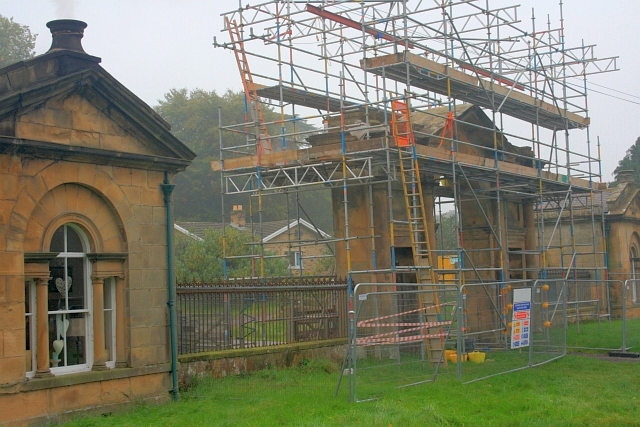
Gated entrance to Forcett Hall (2013)

Forcett Hall is an English country house in the village of Forcett, North Yorkshire, England, some 6.5 miles (10 km) west of Darlington. It is a Grade I listed building.

== History ==
Forcett had been in the possession of the Shuttleworth family of Gawthorpe Hall, Lancashire since 1582. Forcett Hall was originally an Elizabethan house, modified in 1710 by William Benson. After a fire in 1726 it was substantially redesigned in 1740 in the Palladian style by architect Daniel Garrett under Richard Shuttleworth, MP, vacating the family seat at Gawthorpe to move in.

It passed to his son James, MP for Preston and Lancashire and High Sheriff of Yorkshire for 1760–61. James' son Robert inherited the property on his father's death in 1773 but sold it in 1784. His son Robert moved back to live at Gawthorpe.

Robert, let Forcett Hall to Algernon Percy, 1st Earl of Beverley, who remained in occupation when Robert Shuttleworth sold the Forcett Hall Estate in 1785 to Frances Michell and her son, Charles Michell. Forcett Hall passed by descent until 1938 when it was bought by Lieutenant Colonel Hardress Waller.

It acted as family home to the Heathcote family from 1938 to 2020, managed by James and Alison Heathcote, who provided hospitality for special and corporate events.

In 2011, the property was placed on the market with an asking price of £5.5 million. The house featured in 2016 in the Channel 4 series Obsessive Compulsive Cleaners. The price was lowered to £4 million, and according to the listing, is in need of some refurbishment.

In 2021 the hall was acquired by property developer Karen Stephenson.

== Architecture ==
The 12,583 square feet (1,169.0 m^{2}) building has three floors, and a basement with four main reception rooms, 15 bedrooms and a self-contained east wing with three further bedrooms. It is approached through an arched carriageway with four Roman Doric columns and a Doric frieze. Nearby are Grade II listed north and south lodges.

Several other buildings in the grounds are listed.

=== Dovecote ===
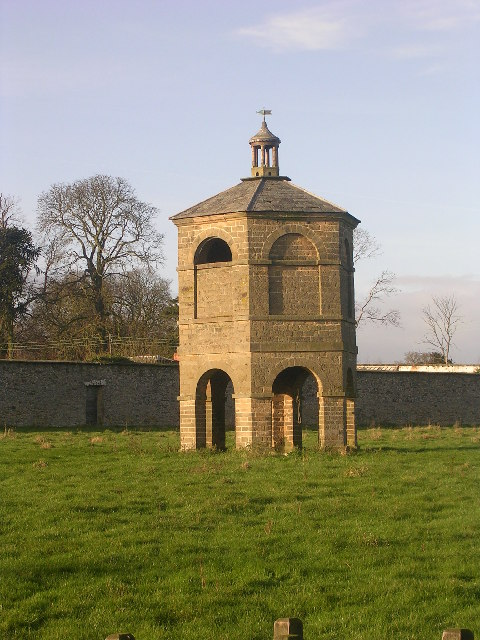
The dovecote

A dovecote at Forcett is first mentioned in 1566. The current building in the grounds of the hall was constructed in about 1740. It is built of sandstone and brick, with a band, a moulded cornice, and a hipped Westmorland slate roof. It has a hexagonal plan, and two stages. On each face in the ground floor is an open round arch, and on the angles are piers with bases and imposts. The upper stage contains blind round-arched openings with a sill band and an impost band. On the roof is a wooden colonnaded cupola with a lead conical roof and a weathervane. It is grade II* listed.

=== Stable block ===
The stable block to the east of the hall was built about 1770. It is constructed of sandstone with hipped Westmorland slate roofs, and consists of a two-storey main range and single-storey wings to the rear, forming a U-shaped plan. The main range has nine bays, the middle three bays projecting under a pediment. In the centre is a round-arched carriageway, and the outer bays contain arcades with round-arched sash windows in recessed round arches, and a continuous impost band. The other ranges contain various openings, in the south range is a pump in a wooden box, and at the end of the north range is a lean-to store with a Welsh slate roof on an Ionic column. It is grade II* listed.

=== Grotto and icehouse ===
The grotto and icehouse in the grounds of the hall are built of sandstone and brick. The grotto has three bays, and a passage from the middle bay leads to a circular brick icehouse. The grotto has three roundish arches, behind which are three barrel vaulted chambers. From the outer sides, doorways with pointed arches lead to the garden. The building is grade II* listed.

=== East gateway and lodges ===
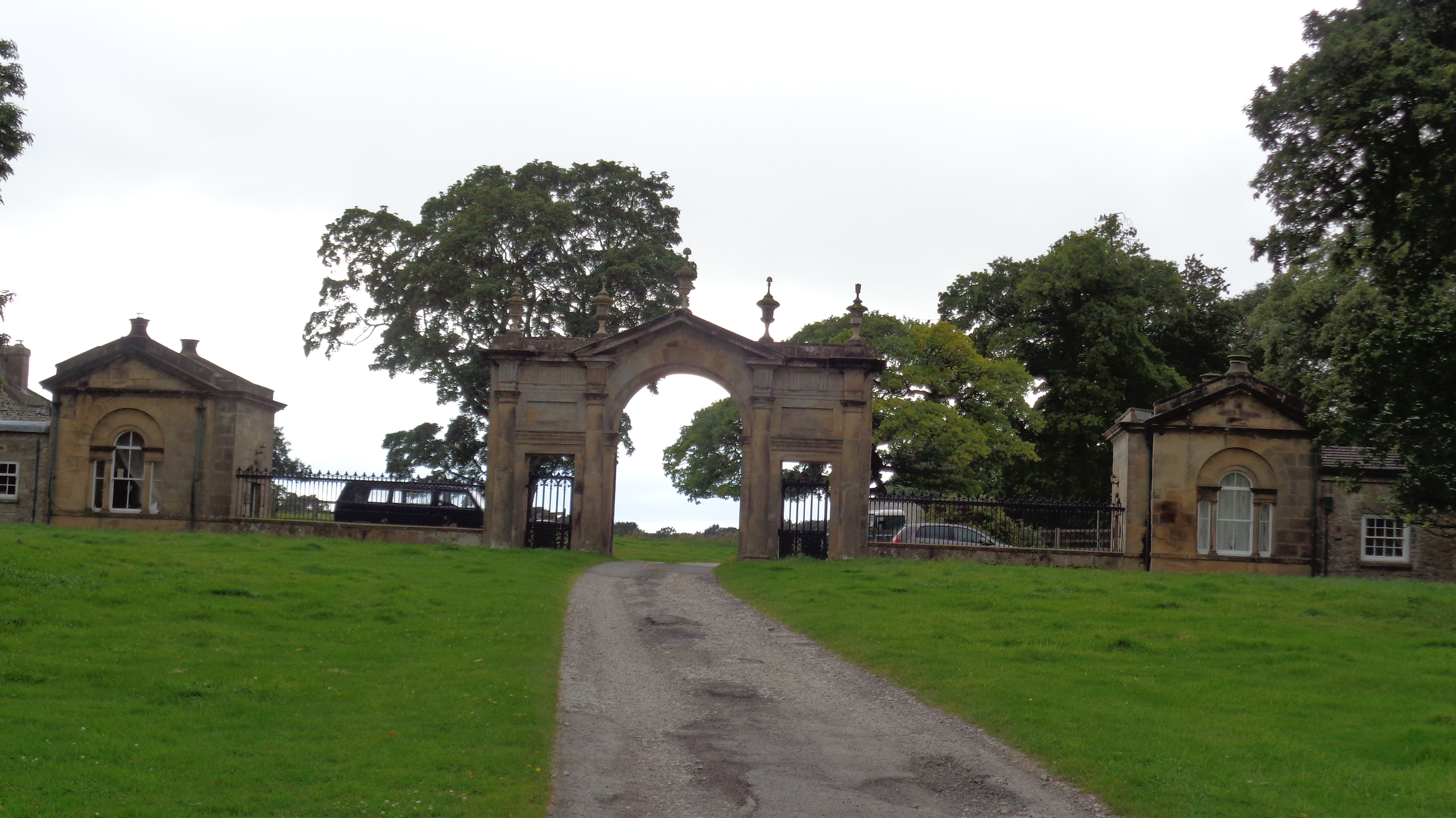
East lodges and gateway

At the east entrance to the grounds of the hall is a gateway and lodges in sandstone, built in the early 18th century and all grade II* listed. The gateway has a central round-arched carriageway flanked by flat-headed pedestrian entrances. It has four Roman Doric half-columns carrying an open central pediment, and a large Doric frieze over the side gates, and is surmounted by five large urn finials. The decorative gates are in cast iron, and the gateway is linked to the lodges by walls with cast iron railings with decorative finials. Each lodge has a single storey and a single bay, and contains a Venetian window within a round arch, and above it is a pediment. The doorway has a ]rusticated quoined surround, and a lintel with a large tripartite keystone.

== Park ==
It stands in 85 hectares of parkland which contains several listed buildings including a grotto incorporating an ice house and mount, a wilderness garden, the Stanwick Late Iron Age Oppidum, and a large collection of veteran and rare trees, including one of the largest cedar trees in the country. The park is on the English Heritage Register of Historic Parks and Gardens of Special Historic Interest. The dovecote is a Grade II listed building of 1740, designed by Garrett.

== See also ==
- Grade I listed buildings in North Yorkshire (district)
- Listed buildings in Forcett
