= St John the Baptist's Church, Stanwick =

Coordinates: 54.5028°N 1.7156°W

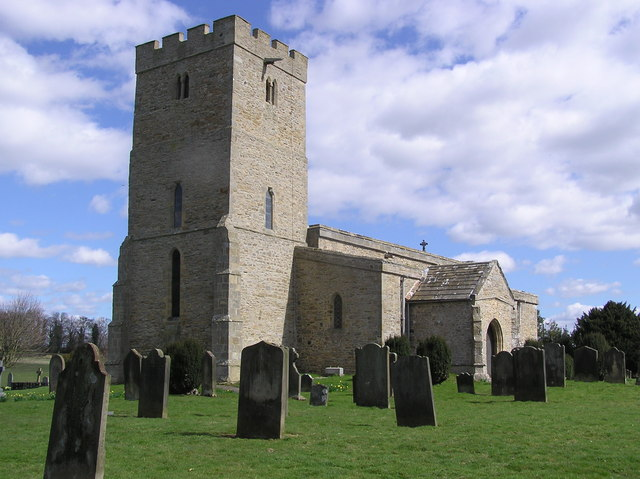
- St John the Baptist's Church, Stanwick, from the southeast

- Location in North Yorkshire
- OS grid reference: NZ 185 119
- Location: Stanwick St John, North Yorkshire
- Country: England
- Denomination: Anglican
- Website: Churches Conservation Trust

History
- Dedication: John the Baptist

Architecture
- Functional status: Redundant
- Heritage designation: Grade I
- Designated: 4 February 1969
- Architect: Anthony Salvin (1868 restoration)
- Architectural type: Church
- Style: Gothic, Gothic Revival
- Completed: 1868

Specifications
- Materials: Stone rubble, roofs in stone slate, artificial stone slate and lead

St John the Baptist's Church is a redundant Anglican church in the village of Stanwick St John, North Yorkshire, England. It is recorded in the National Heritage List for England as a designated Grade I listed building, and is under the care of the Churches Conservation Trust. The site of the church is recognised as a Scheduled Monument, and it stands within the earthworks of Stanwick Camp, a settlement originating in the early Iron Age.

== History ==
The present church dates from the 13th century, although the discovery of a 9th-century cross shaft in the churchyard suggests that there was an earlier church on the site. It was "heavily restored" in 1868 by Anthony Salvin. St John's was vested in the Trust on 1 June 1990.

== Architecture ==
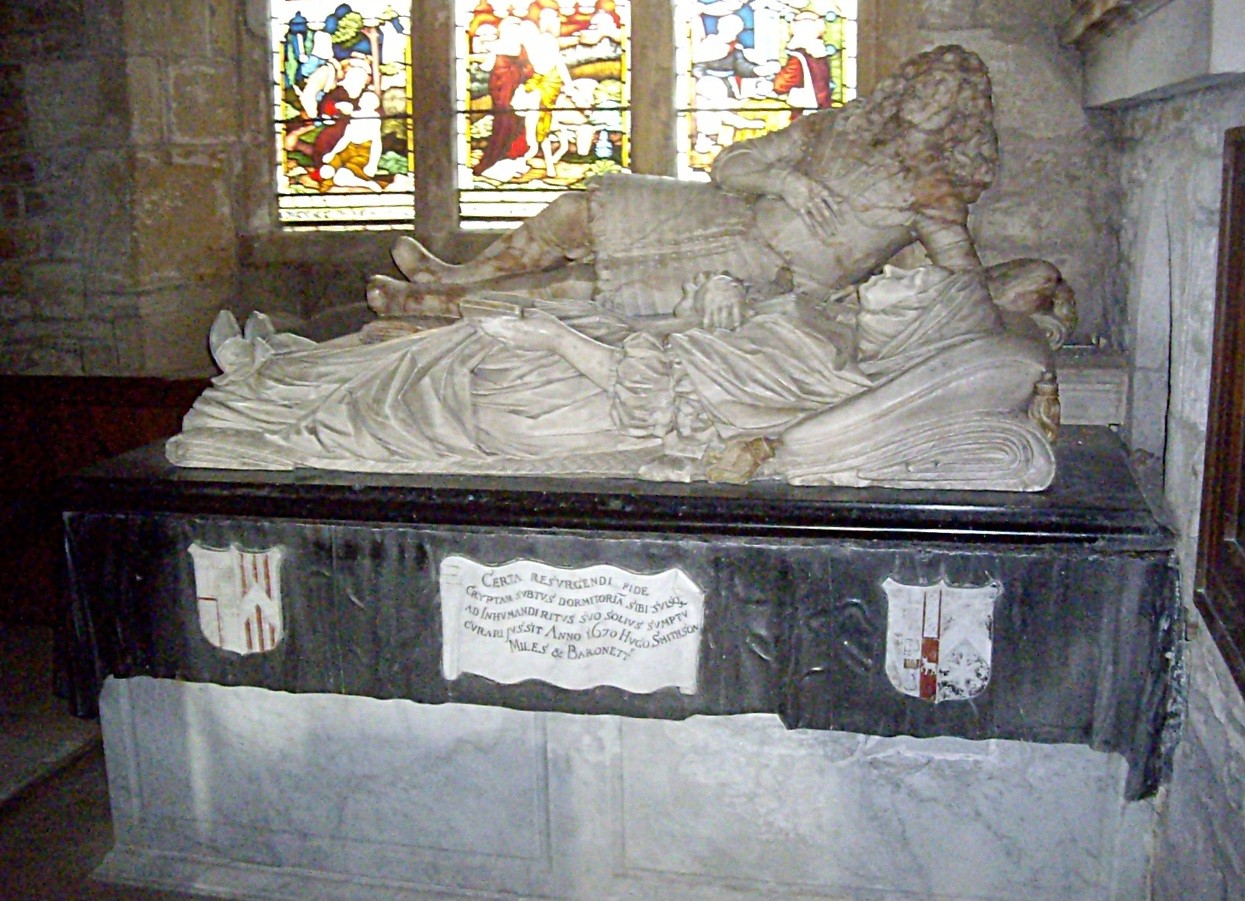
Monument of Sir Hugh Smithson, 1st Baronet (d.1670), St John the Baptist's Church, Stanwick, Yorks.

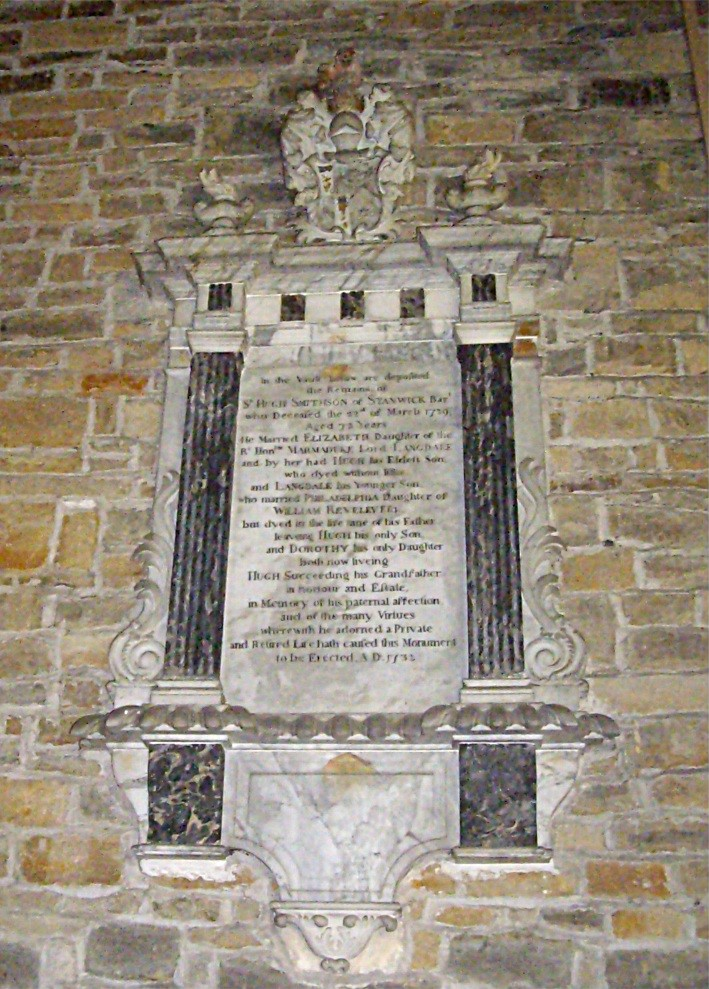
Mural monument to Sir Hugh Smithson, 3rd Baronet, who married Elizabeth Langdale, daughter of Marmaduke Langdale, 2nd Baron Langdale, Church of St John the Baptist, Stanwick, Yorks.

=== Exterior ===
The church is constructed in stone rubble, and the roofs are in stone slate, artificial stone slate and lead. Its plan consists of a four-bay nave with a south aisle and a south porch, a three-bay chancel with a north vestry that was added in the 19th century, and a west tower. The tower is in three stages, and has quoins and stepped diagonal buttresses. In the lowest stage, the west face has a lancet window above a central buttress, and there is a similar lancet window on each face in the middle stage. In the top stage are two-light bell openings, and the summit has a battlemented parapet. On the ground, on the west side, is a medieval stone coffin lying on its side. On the north side is a five-sided stair turret that was added in the 19th century. The porch has stepped diagonal buttresses, and an arched doorway over which is a sundial. The inner door dates from the 13th century. Incorporated in the fabric of the south aisle are carved stones dating from the Anglo-Saxon and medieval periods. It has a 19th-century single-light west window, two three-light windows in the south wall dating from the 19th century and a three-light, 13th-century east window. In the north wall of the church are three two-light windows containing Decorated and Perpendicular tracery. The chancel contains a priest's doorway and a number of windows, including a three-light east window with Decorated tracery. The vestry has a two-light 19th-century window.

=== Interior ===
Internally there is a four-bay south arcade, a tower arch and a chancel arch. In the north wall of the chancel is a recumbent effigy and in the south wall is a 19th-century piscina and a stepped triple sedilia. In the south aisle is another piscina and an aumbry. The font dates from the 19th century and has a 17th-century carved canopy. The church contains a number of tombs and monuments to the memory of the Smithson family. On the east wall of the chancel are boards painted with the Lord's Prayer, Creeds, and the Commandments. Over the chancel arch are the royal arms of George III, and around the church are hatchments. The organ was built in 1866 by John Fincham of London. There is a ring of three bells, all cast by Samuel I. Smith, two in 1677, and the third in 1685.

== External features ==
In the environs of the church are seven structures each of which is designated as a Grade II listed building. To the south of the south aisle are four sandstone tombstones dating from the 18th century, and on the east side of the porch is another group of four tombstones from the same period. To the south of the porch are two memorials, one to William Newcomb who died in 1752, and the other to Richard Slater dating from the early 18th century. South of the chancel is an Anglo-Saxon cross-shaft dating probably from the 9th century. To the north-northeast of the church are two wells built in the late 19th century for the Duke of Northumberland and possibly designed by Anthony Salvin. The smaller one is some 150 metres from the church around a spring, and this feeds the other well about 100 metres from the church.

== See also ==
- Grade I listed buildings in North Yorkshire (district)
- Listed buildings in Stanwick St John
- List of churches preserved by the Churches Conservation Trust in Northern England
