= Forcett =

Village North Yorkshire, England

Coordinates: 54°30′22″N 1°43′48″W

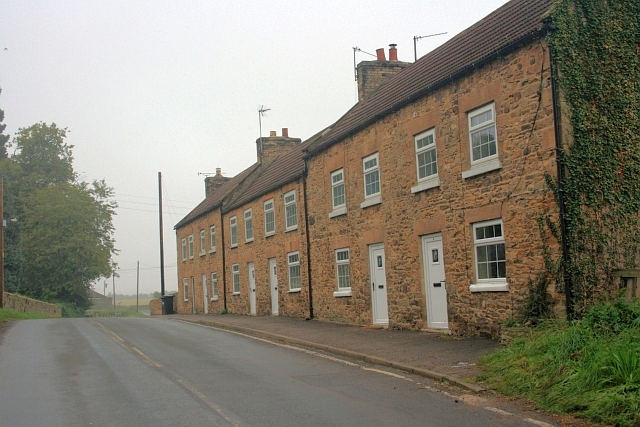
- Church Row, Forcett

- Location within North Yorkshire
- Population: 110 (2011 census)
- OS grid reference: NZ175811
- Civil parish: Forcett
- Unitary authority: North Yorkshire
- Ceremonial county: North Yorkshire
- Region: Yorkshire and the Humber
- Country: England
- Sovereign state: United Kingdom
- Post town: Richmond
- Postcode district: DL11
- Police: North Yorkshire
- Fire: North Yorkshire
- Ambulance: Yorkshire

Forcett is a village in the county of North Yorkshire, England. It lies near the border with County Durham, on the B6274 road about 8 miles south of Staindrop. Nearby villages include Eppleby, Caldwell and Aldbrough.

From 1974 to 2023 it was part of the district of Richmondshire, it is now administered by the unitary North Yorkshire Council.

== History ==
The origin of the place-name is from the Old English words ford and set meaning fold by a ford and appears as Forset in the Domesday Book of 1086.

In 1367, the manor was granted to Sir Walter Urswyk by John of Gaunt, Duke of Lancaster, Earl of Richmond, for Urswyk's valour at the Battle of Navarretta during the Hundred Years' War. Urswyk was later High Constable of Richmond Castle and Master Forester of the Forest of Bowland.

== Buildings ==
St Cuthbert's Church, Forcett is located in the centre of the village.

On the edge of the village is Forcett Park in which stands Forcett Hall, a Palladian country house rebuilt in 1740.
