= De León (surname) =

De León or de León or De Leon is a Spanish origin surname, often toponymic, in which case it may possibly indicate an ultimate family origin in the Kingdom of León or the later Province of León.

== Geographical distribution ==
As of 2014, 29.7% of all known bearers of the surname de León were residents of the Philippines (frequency 1:647), 26.4% of Guatemala (1:116), 20.0% of Mexico (1:1,179), 8.1% of the Dominican Republic (1:244), 4.1% of Panama (1:182), 2.2% of the United States (1:31,581), 2.1% of Uruguay (1:313), 1.7% of Spain (1:5,084) and 1.0% of El Salvador (1:1,194).

In Spain, the frequency of the surname was higher than the national average (1:5,084) in the following autonomous communities:

1. Canary Islands (1:427)
2. Community of Madrid (1:4,329)

In Guatemala, the frequency of the surname was higher than the national average (1:116) in the following departments:

1. San Marcos Department (1:35)
2. Jutiapa Department (1:42)
3. Quetzaltenango Department (1:45)
4. Retalhuleu Department (1:49)
5. El Progreso Department (1:72)
6. Suchitepéquez Department (1:100)
7. Izabal Department (1:106)

== People ==
Notable people with the surname De León include,

- Beatrice de Leon (1902–1991), British Theatre manager
- Carlos de León (1959–2020), Puerto Rican boxer
- Carlos Enrique Díaz de León (1910–1971), Provisional President of Guatemala 1954
- Charito de León (born 1939), Filipina actress
- Christopher de Leon (born 1956), Filipino actor and politician
- Daniel De Leon (1852–1914), Venezuelan-born Sephardic Jew, American socialist and trade unionist
- Delia de Leon (1901–1993), British actress and disciple of Meher Baba
- Diego de León y Navarrete (1807–1841), Spanish military figure
- Edgar René De León Moreno, Guatemalan politician
- Edwin de Leon (1818–1891), American/Confederate diplomat and writer
- Florante de Leon (born TBA), Filipino singer
- Gerardo de León (1913–1981), Filipino film actor and director
- Gil de León (1916–1992), Filipino film actor and director
- Jack de Leon (1902–1956), British theatre manager, impresario and playwright
- Jane De Leon (born 1998), Filipina actress, singer, model, and dancer
- Joaquín Velázquez de León, Minister of State of Mexico
- Joel de León, styled Joel Deleōn (born 1999), American singer
- Joey de Leon (born 1946), Filipino comedian and television host
- José De León (born 1992), Puerto Rican baseball player
- José García de León y Pizarro (1770–1835), Minister of State of Spain 1816–1818
- Juan Manuel de León Merchante (1626–1680), Spanish dramatist
- Juan Velázquez de León (died 1520), Spanish conquistador with Hernán Cortés
- Juana María de los Dolores de León Smith (1798–1872), wife of General Sir Harry Smith, Governor of the Cape Colony, South Africa
- Kathleen de Leon Jones (born 1977), Filipino-Australian singer, dancer, actress and television performer, Hi-5
- Lautaro De León (born 2001), Uruguayan footballer
- Lotlot de Leon (born 1971), Filipina actress
- Lucrecia de León (born 1568), Spanish alleged prophetic dreamer
- Luis de León (1527–1591), Spanish lyric poet and Augustinian friar
- McCoy De Leon (born 1995), Filipino actor and model
- Miguel de León (born 1962), Venezuelan actor
- Mike de León (Miguel de Leon) (1947–2025), Filipino film director, scriptwriter, and producer
- Moses de León or Moshe ben Shem-Tov (1250–1305), Spanish rabbi and Kabbalist
- Nathalie de Leon, Filipino-American chemist and physicist
- Nick DeLeon (born 1990), American soccer player for D.C. United
- Oscar de León (born 1943), Venezuelan singer
- Pedro Cieza de León (1520–1554), Jewish-origin New Christian Spanish conquistador and historian
- Ernesto Zedillo Ponce de León (born 1951), former Mexican president
- Perla de Leon (born 1952), American artist and photographer
- Rafael De Leon aka Roaring Lion (1908–1999), Trinidadian calypsonian
- Ramiro de León Carpio (1942–2002), President of Guatemala 1993–1996
- Rudy de Leon (born 1952), American Deputy Secretary of Defense
- Thomas Cooper de Leon (1839–1914), American journalist, author, and playwright
- Tiburcio de Leon, Filipino revolutionary general
- Victor De Leon III aka Lil Poison, (born May 6, 1998) recognized by Guinness Book of World Records as the youngest professional video game player

== Fictional characters ==
- Cervantes de León, a character in the Soul Series of fighting games

== See also ==
- Ponce de León (disambiguation)
