= Kew Bridge =

Bridge in Kew, London, England

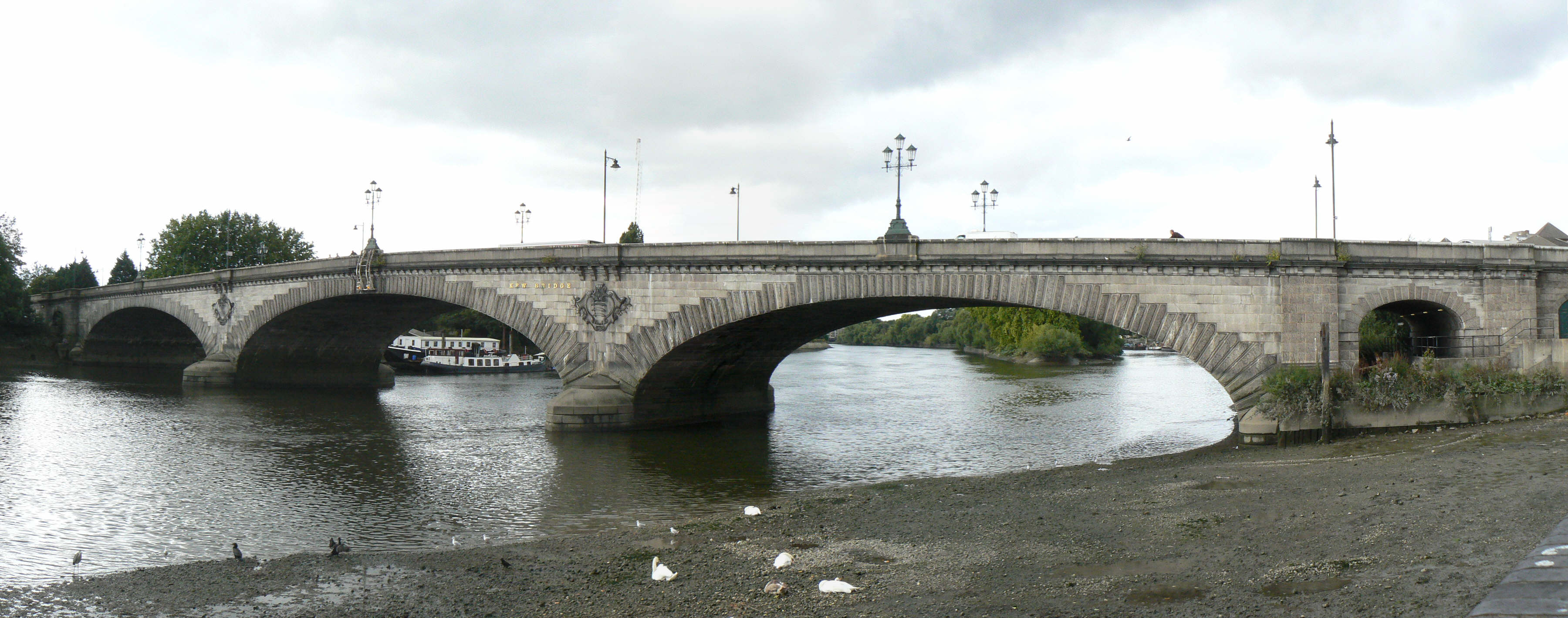
- The current (third) Kew Bridge
- Coordinates: 51°29′13″N 0°17′15″W
- Carries: A205 road
- Crosses: River Thames
- Locale: Kew
- Maintained by: Transport for London
- Heritage status: Grade II listed structure

Characteristics
- Design: Arch
- Material: Granite
- Total length: 1,182 feet (360 m)
- Width: 75 feet (23 m)
- Longest span: 133 feet (41 m)
- No. of spans: 3
- Piers in water: 2

History
- Designer: John Wolfe-Barry and Cuthbert Arthur Brereton
- Opened: 20 May 1903; 123 years ago

Statistics
- Toll: Abolished 8 February 1873

Listed Building – Grade II
- Official name: Kew Bridge
- Designated: 25 June 1983; 43 years ago (Richmond listing); 11 February 1998; 28 years ago (Hounslow listing)
- Reference no.: 1193845 (Richmond listing); 1376778 (Hounslow listing)

Location
- Interactive map of Kew Bridge

Kew Bridge is a wide-span bridge over the Tideway (upper estuary of the Thames) linking the London Boroughs of Richmond upon Thames and Hounslow. The present bridge, which was opened in 1903 as King Edward VII Bridge by King Edward VII and Queen Alexandra, (Note: A plaque, now faded, on the bridge reads: KING EDWARD VII BRIDGE THIS BRIDGE WAS BUILT AT THE JOINT COST OF THE COUNTIES OF MIDDLESEX AND SURREY IT WAS OPENED BY HIS MOST GRACIOUS MAJESTY KING EDWARD VII ACCOMPANIED BY QUEEN ALEXANDRA ON THE 20TH MAY 1903 Domine salvum fac regem nostrum Edvardum) was designed by John Wolfe-Barry and Cuthbert Arthur Brereton. Historic England listed it at Grade II in 1983.

== Location ==
Kew Bridge crosses the west of the Tideway between the Kew Green neighbourhood of Kew on the south bank and Brentford on the north bank. Its southern approach adjoins the Royal Botanic Gardens; the northern adjoins the former Grand Junction Waterworks Company buildings and reservoirs (the remnant of which is the London Museum of Water & Steam).

The bridge forms a primary route joining the South Circular and North Circular roads to the west of London, and can be very congested.

On the eastward Kew bank is Kew Pier, which serves tourist ferries operating under licence from London River Services.

== History ==
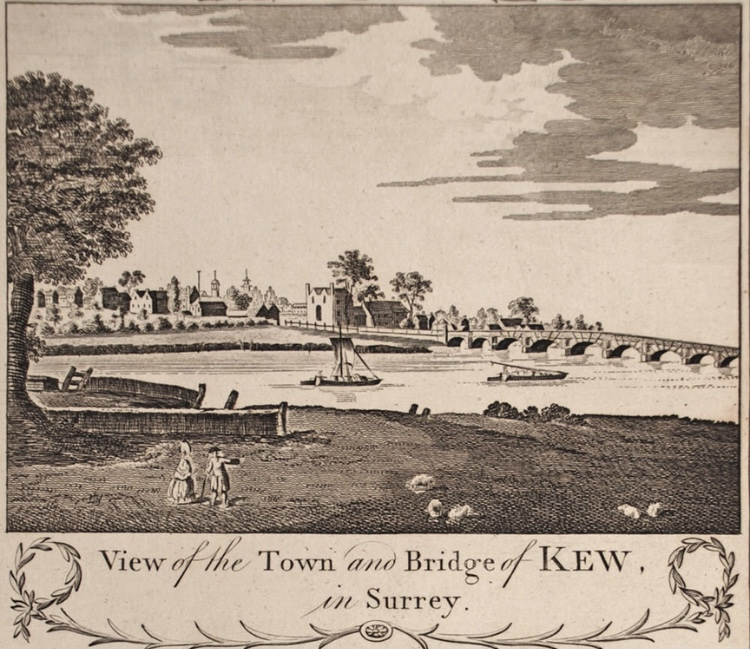
The Town and Bridge of Kew, 1774

The Museum of Richmond has an engraving by John Barnard, architect of the design for the first Kew Bridge, dedicated to George, Prince of Wales and his mother Augusta and dated 1759. Bernard describes it as the Bridge over the River of Thames from Kew in the County of Surry to the opposite shore in the County of Middlesex. Kew and the area around the bridge was significant to George as his father Frederick took a lease on Kew House, now part of the Royal Botanic Gardens from 1731 and rebuilt the house to designs by William Kent. George's mother Augusta started the botanic gardens and created many of the garden buildings.

The first bridge was built by Robert Tunstall of Brentford who previously owned the ferry on the site. The bridge was inaugurated on 1 June 1759 by the Prince of Wales driving over it with his mother and a number of other royals, and was opened to the public three days later. Such was the excitement that over 3,000 people crossed in one day. Tolls ranged from 1 penny for each pedestrian to one shilling and six pence for a coach and four horses (these are equivalent to 70p and £18 in 2025).

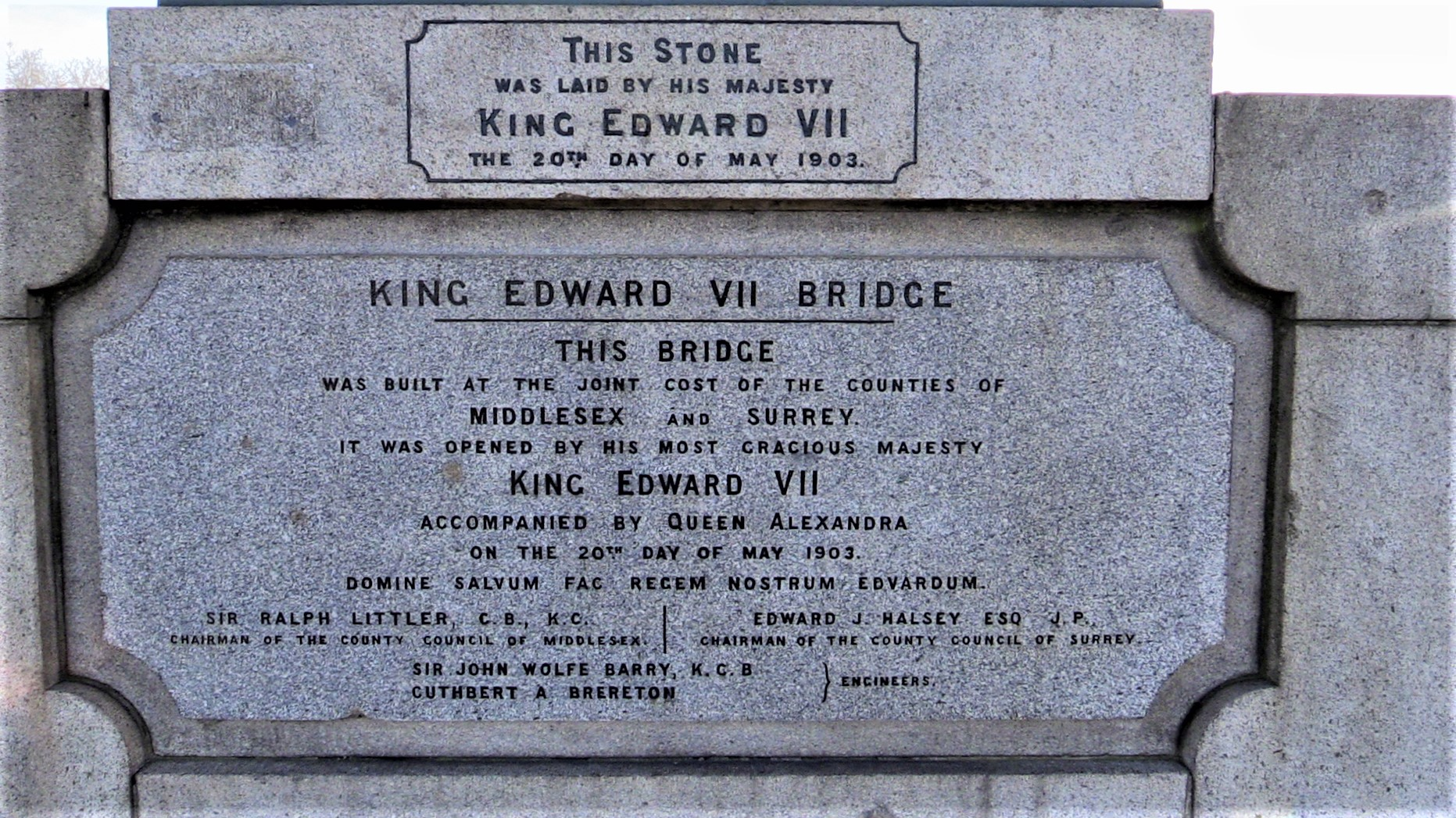
Stone plaque at the centre of the present bridge on its east side, confirming its history

Kew Bridge (Building and Tolls) Act 1782
- Act of Parliament
- Parliament of Great Britain
- Long title: An Act for building a Stone Bridge cross the River of Thames, from the Parish of Ealing, in the County of Middlesex, to the opposite Shore in the Hamlet of Kew, in the County of Surrey.
- Citation: 22 Geo. 3. c. 42
- Territorial extent: Great Britain

Dates
- Royal assent: 17 May 1782
- Commencement: 27 November 1781 (Note: Start of session.)
- Repealed: 30 July 1948
Other legislation
Repealed by	Statute Law Revision Act 1948

Status: Repealed

Text of statute as originally enacted

The first bridge was constructed with two stone arches at each end and seven timber arches in between, which proved costly to maintain and as a consequence the bridge only lasted 30 years. In 1782 Robert Tunstall, son of the builder of the first bridge, obtained consent in the Kew Bridge (Building and Tolls) Act 1782 (22 Geo. 3. c. 42) to replace the bridge and work began on 4 June 1783, the anniversary date of the first bridge opening to the public. The new bridge was designed by James Paine who had previously been responsible for Richmond Bridge. The cost was £16,500 (equivalent to £2.15 million in 2025) which was raised by means of a tontine.

The second bridge was built alongside the first, to avoid hindrance to traffic during construction work, and this time was built entirely of stone. It was again opened, on 22 September 1789, by George, who by this time had become King George III, crossing with a great concourse of carriages. The tolls were a half penny per pedestrian and 6 pence for each horse (these are equivalent to 28p and £3 in 2025). The bridge was sold by auction to a Mr Robinson for £23,000 in 1819 (equivalent to £1.74 million in 2025) and again in 1873, to the City of London Corporation and the Metropolitan Board of Works for £57,300 (equivalent to £5.39 million in 2025). The exhibition included a copy of a J. M. W. Turner sketch of the second bridge from Brentford Ait c. 1805/6 with barges on the left.

The tollbooths were at the Brentford end of the bridge and were originally planned as pavilions with Doric porticos. To save on the cost rather simpler Italianate booths were built instead of brick and stucco. Under the Kew and Other Bridges Act 1869 (32 & 33 Vict. c. xix), tolls were abolished on 8 February 1873 and a triumphal arch was built at the Brentford entrance to the bridge. The gates were removed and paraded on a brewer's dray through Brentford and around Kew Green.

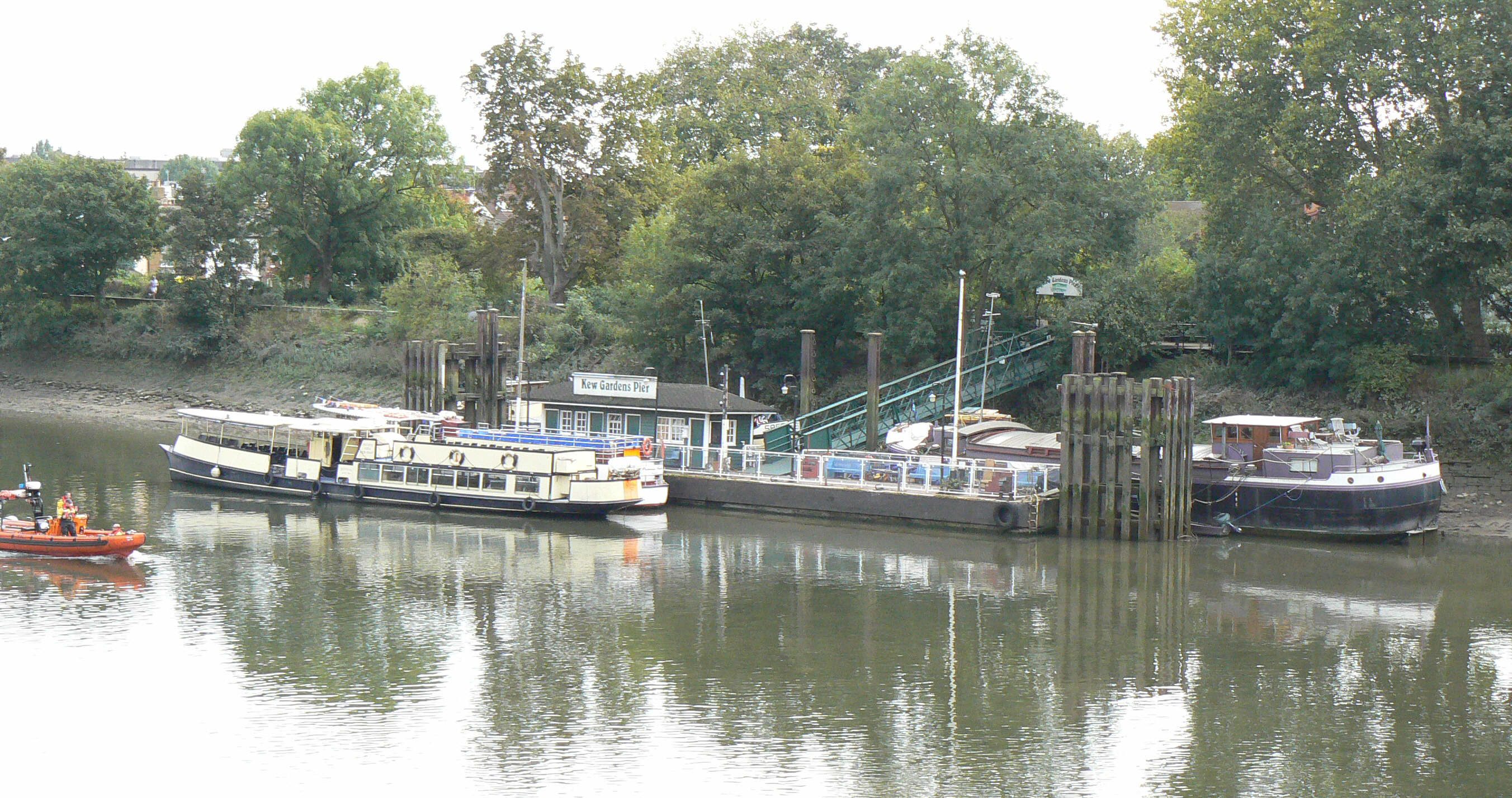
Kew Pier is a few metres downstream of Kew Bridge

By the 1890s it was clear that the second bridge could not really cope with the weight of traffic and in any case the approach was too narrow and steep on the Brentford side. The engineer Sir John Wolfe Barry was invited to assess the bridge in 1892 and recommended building a new bridge rather than modifications to the second one.

Kew Bridge Act 1898
- Act of Parliament
- Parliament of the United Kingdom
- Long title: An Act to empower the County Councils of the Administrative Counties of Middlesex and Surrey to rebuild Kew Bridge and to make new approaches thereto and to execute other works in connexion therewith and for other purposes.
- Citation: 61 & 62 Vict. c. clv

Dates
- Royal assent: 25 July 1889
Other legislation
Repealed by	Middlesex County Council Act 1944
Relates to	Kew Bridge Act 1898 Amendment Act 1899

Status: Repealed

Text of statute as originally enacted

Kew Bridge Act 1898 Amendment Act 1899
- Act of Parliament
- Parliament of the United Kingdom
- Long title: An Act to empower the County Councils of the Administrative Counties of Middlesex and Surrey to raise further moneys for the purposes of the Kew Bridge Act 1898.
- Citation: 62 & 63 Vict. c. xliv

Dates
- Royal assent: 20 June 1899
Other legislation
Relates to	Kew Bridge Act 1898

Text of statute as originally enacted

The Kew Bridge Act 1898 (61 & 62 Vict. c. clv) paved the way and the third bridge was commissioned jointly by the Middlesex and Surrey county councils at a cost of £250,000 (equivalent to £28.1 million in 2025). The engineers were Barry and Brereton and the building contractors were Easton Gibbs and Son. The third bridge is 1,182 feet (360 m) long, and the largest of its three arches has a span of 133 feet (41 m). The roadway is 56 feet (17 m) wide (compared to 18 feet (5.5 m) on the second bridge), and the pavements 9 feet 6 inches (2.90 m) compared to 3 feet 3 inches (0.99 m). It was built of granite from Kemnay Quarry.

A temporary wooden bridge was put in place upstream of the second bridge before demolition during October to December 1899. The third bridge was completed for an official opening on 20 May 1903 by King Edward VII and Queen Alexandra who processed through Kensington, Hammersmith, Chiswick and Brentford on the way to the ceremony, returning via Mortlake and Barnes and re-crossing the Thames at Putney Bridge.

The centre of the bridge was provided with a tented pavilion 60 yards long and spanning its whole width. A special temporary balcony, projecting from this, was installed so that the crowds on the banks and on the water could see the royal visitors. The king laid the last coping stone with a silver trowel and declared the bridge open. He and the queen were given a number of gifts including bouquets, a bound history of the bridge and various other commemorative items including a silver-mounted prehistoric flint axe found during construction work, another axe with part of its haft remaining and a fine silver spirit level made in the shape of the bridge itself. Later the Mayor of Richmond presented a chair with the ladders in its back carved in the shape of the three bridges. The inhabitants of Brentford and Chiswick presented a 1721 silver tankard.

After the departure of the royals a huge party took place on the lawns at Kew Gardens and 1,000 children were entertained to tea in a marquee on Kew Green, an event hosted by Cuthbert Brereton.

During the silent era of film, a Kew Bridge Studios operated along part of the northern approach. The site was later used by the Q Theatre.

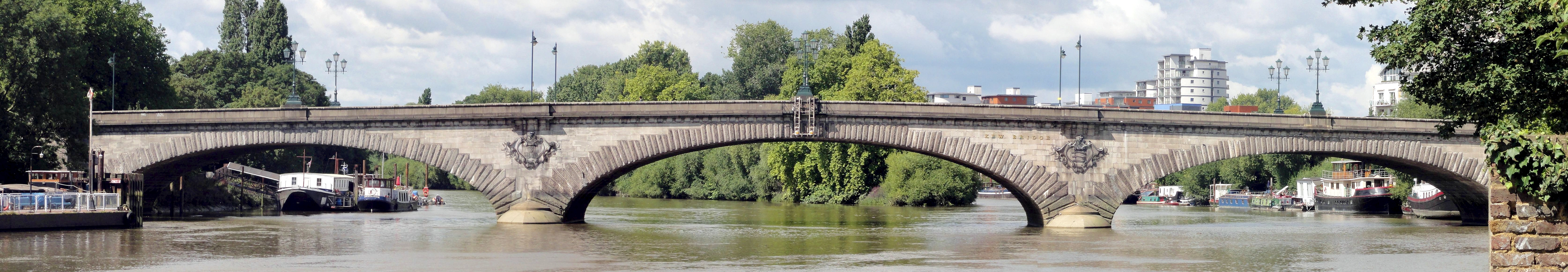
Kew Bridge in 2018

== Kew Bridge in art ==
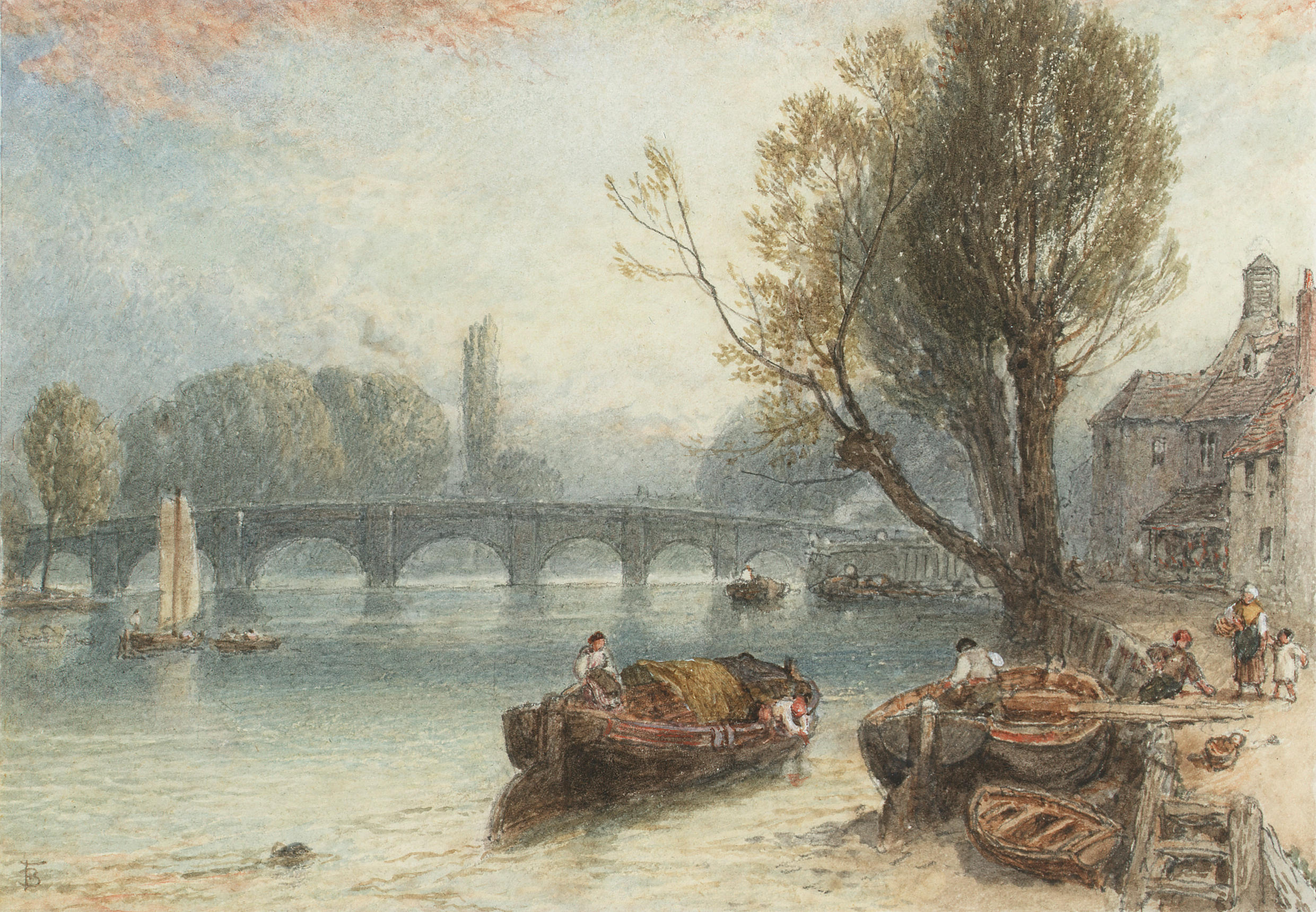
Myles Birket Foster's Kew Bridge from Strand on the Green

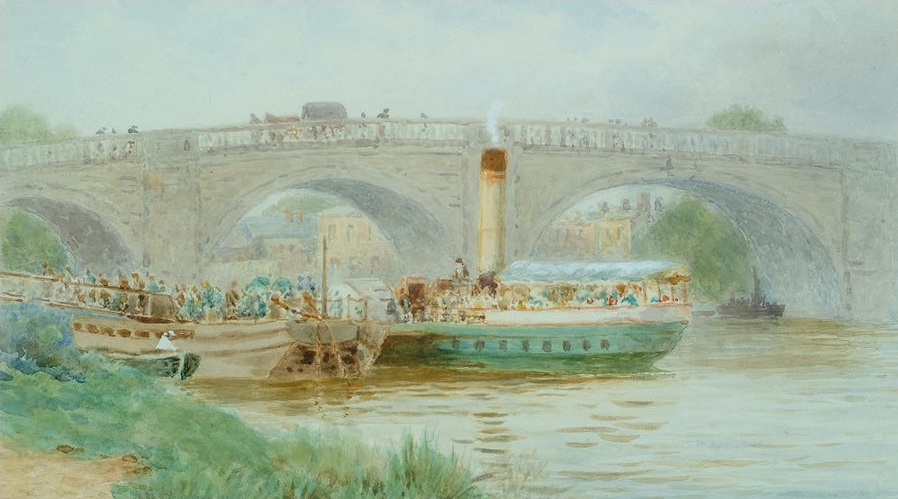
Arrival of a steamer at the Old Kew Bridge by Lewis Pinhorn Wood

A drawing made in 1759 by Paul Sandby, showing the first Kew Bridge built in 1758–1759 by John Barnard, and Old Kew Bridge, London by James Webb, an oil painting dating from 1876 to 1885, are held at the Museum of London.

The oil painting Kew Bridge by Henry Muhrman (1854–1916) was painted in about 1898, when the artist was living in Gunnersbury. It is now in the Tate Gallery's collection.

The Tate also holds J. M. W. Turner's pen and ink sketch The Thames at Kew with Kew Bridge (1805) and his oil painting The Thames Glimpsed between Trees, possibly at Kew Bridge c.1806-7.

Myles Birket Foster (1825–1899) painted Kew Bridge from Strand on the Green.

Landscapist Lewis Pinhorn Wood (1848–1918), who lived in Chiswick between 1897 and 1908, painted Arrival of a Steamer at the Old Kew Bridge, portraying passengers embarking from the river transport service at Kew Pier in front of the second bridge.

Chiswick Local Studies Library has a painting Kew Bridge and Strand-on-the-Green attributed to Smyth Watson and also Strand-on-the-Green and Kew Bridge by an unknown artist.

Hounslow Local Studies Library has Kew Bridge by James Isaiah Lewis, painted in about 1900.

== See also ==
- Crossings of the River Thames
- Kew Bridge railway station
- List of bridges in London
