= Tideway =

Part of the River Thames subject to tides

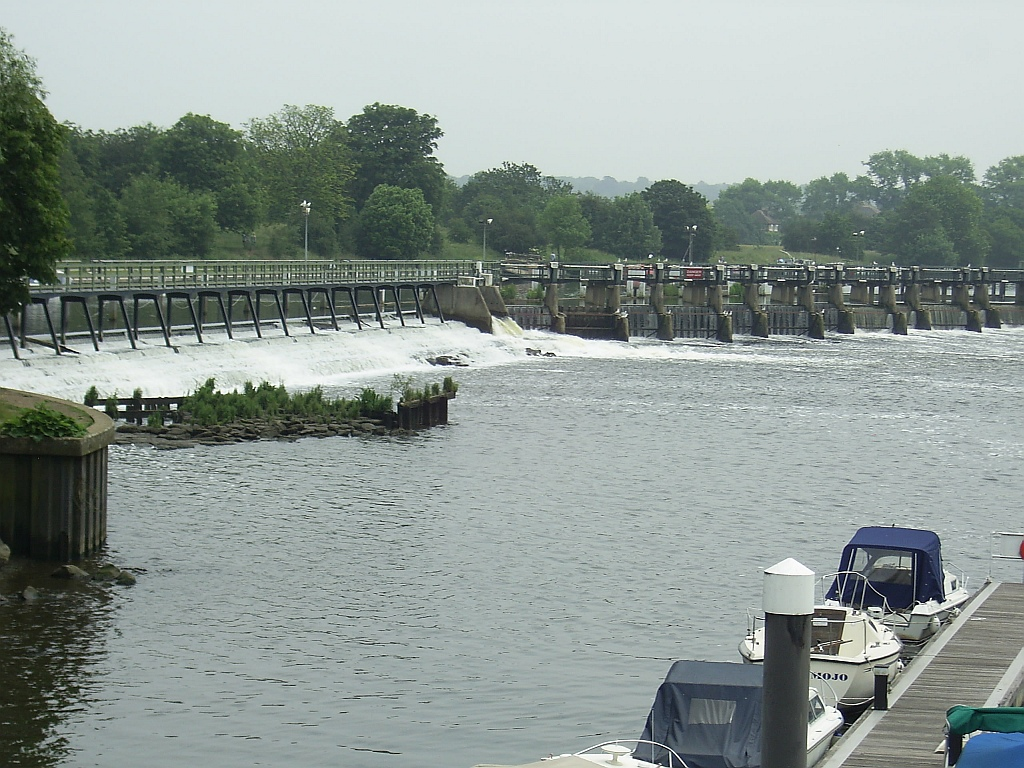
Teddington Weir marks the start of the Tideway

The Tideway is the part of the River Thames in England which is subject to tides. This stretch of water is downstream from Teddington Lock. The Tideway comprises the upper Thames Estuary including the Pool of London.

== Tidal activity ==
Depending on the time of year, the river tide rises and falls twice a day by up to 7 m (24 ft). Because the rising tide is supplemented by the outflow of water from the Thames, it takes longer to subside (6–9 hours) than it does to rise (4–5 hours).

London Bridge is used as the basis for published tide tables giving the times of high tide. High tide reaches Putney about 30 minutes later.

Low-lying banks of London are naturally vulnerable to flooding by storm surges. The threat has increased mostly due to the rise in sea levels caused by climate change, but some is also due to the extremely slow 'tilting' of Great Britain (up in the north and down in the south) due to post-glacial rebound. The city and state have erected defensive barriers, including the Thames Barrier, which was constructed across the Thames at Woolwich to deal with this threat.

== Responsibilities ==
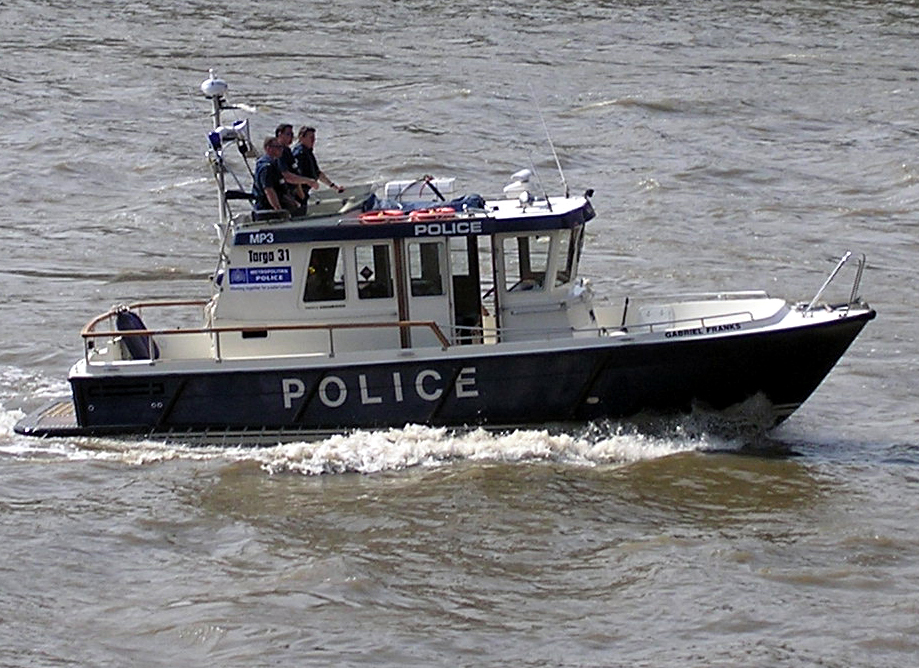
A Fast Response Targa 31 boat of the Marine Support Unit of the Metropolitan Police

The Tideway, often referred to as the Port of London, is managed by the Port of London Authority (PLA). The upstream limit of this authority is marked by an obelisk just short of Teddington Lock and to seaward by the London Stone at Yantlet Creek. The PLA is responsible for one lock on the Thames: Richmond Lock.

Within Greater London, the Tideway is secured by the Metropolitan Police Marine Policing Unit. East of Crayford Ness, Essex Police and Kent Police assume responsibility in their respective jurisdictions. 21st-century criminal investigations have included the Roberto Calvi and Torso in the Thames cases.

London Fire Brigade maintains a fire boat on the river in central London.

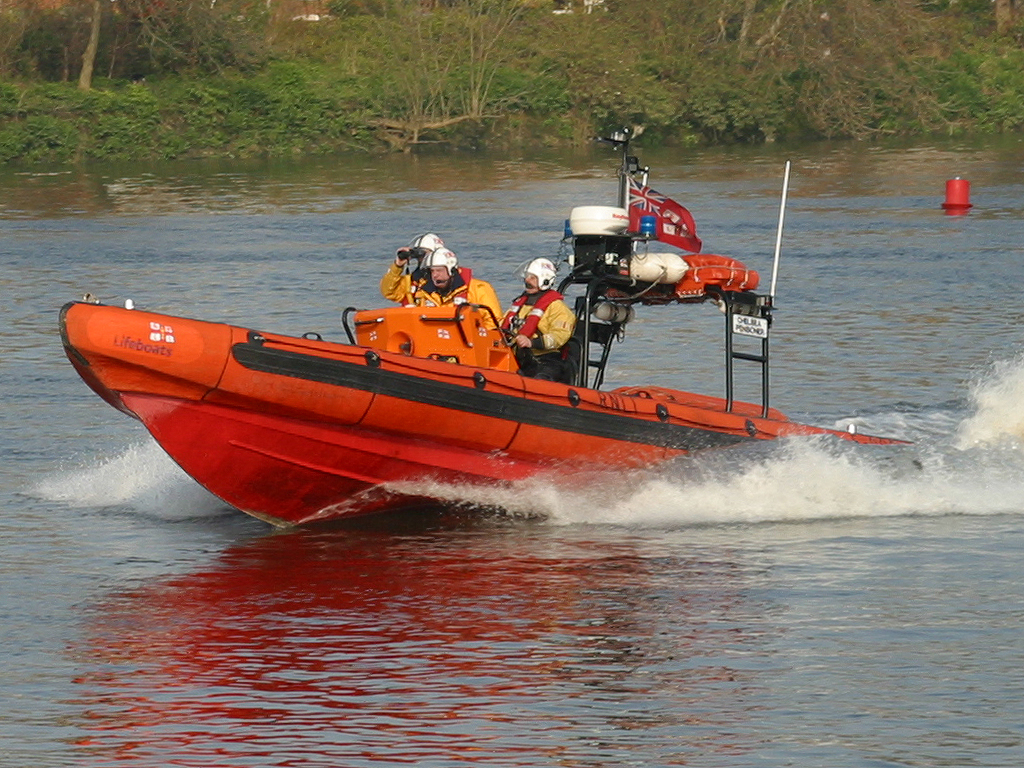
RNLI E class lifeboat based at Chiswick Pier performing a rescue

As a result of the Marchioness disaster in 1989, when 51 people died, the Government asked the Maritime and Coastguard Agency, the Port of London Authority, and the Royal National Lifeboat Institution (RNLI) to work together to set up a dedicated Search and Rescue service for the tidal River Thames. Since 2002, four lifeboat stations have been established on the Thames, at: Teddington, Chiswick, Tower Pier, and Gravesend.

== Navigation ==
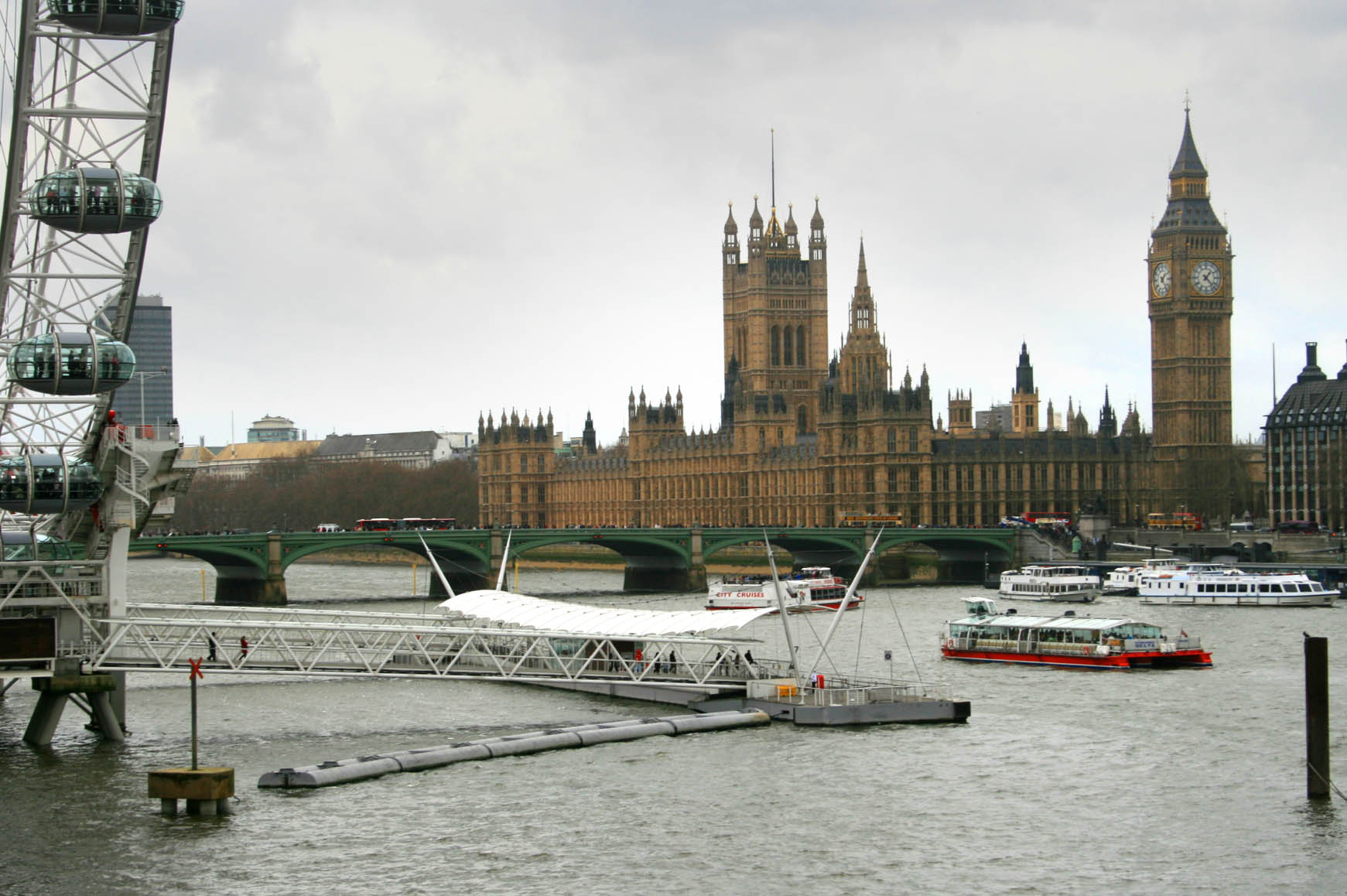
River traffic around Waterloo Pier in 2008

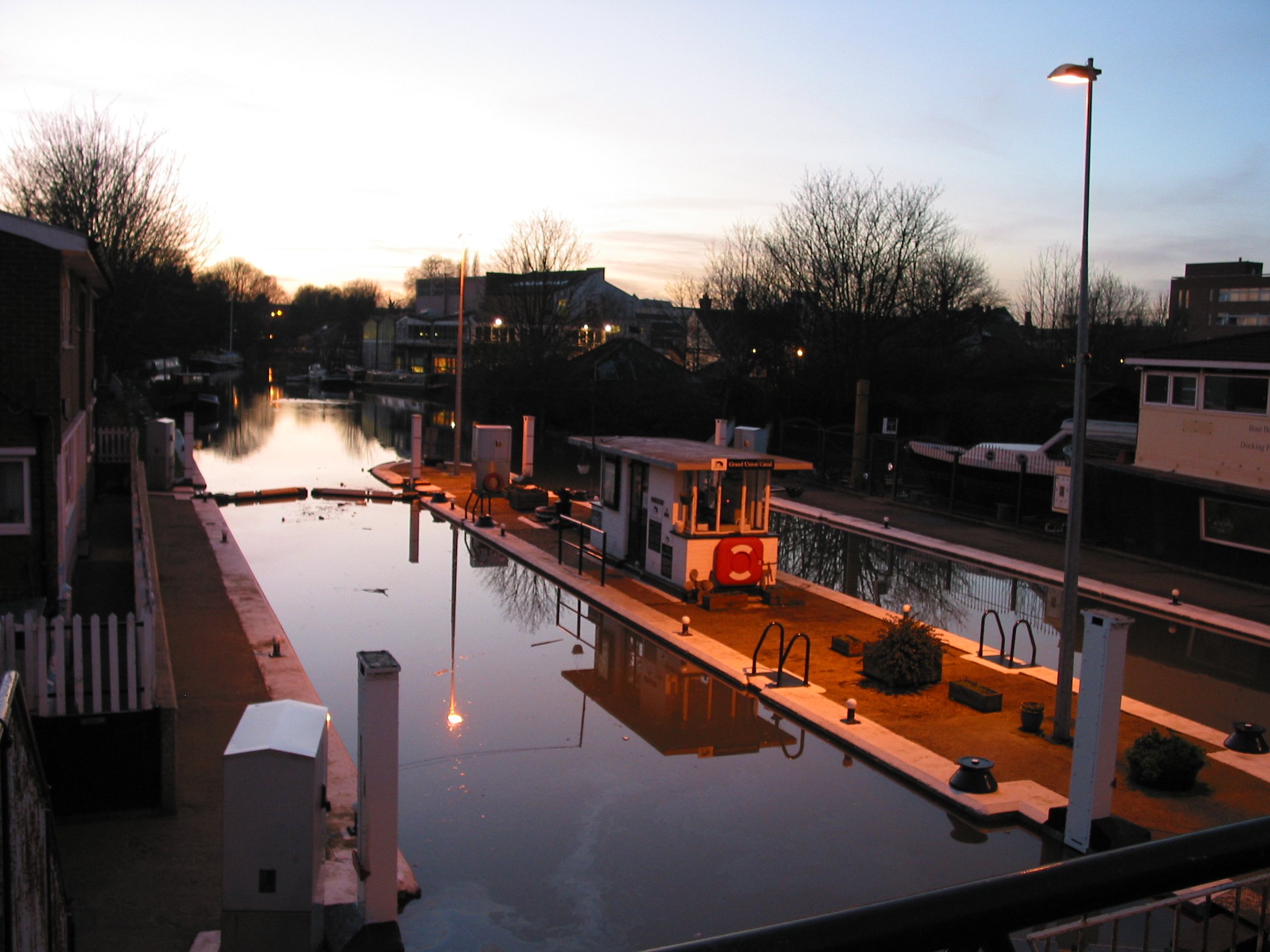
The Thames Lock on the Grand Union Canal at Brentford in 2005

The River is navigable to large ocean-going ships as far as the Pool of London at London Bridge. The Port of London is the United Kingdom's largest port by tonnage. Today, little commercial traffic passes above the Thames Barrier. Central London is visited occasionally by cruise ships or warships, which moor alongside HMS Belfast, and a few smaller aggregate or refuse vessels, operating from wharves in the west of London. Most trade is handled by the Port of Tilbury, roll-on/roll-off ferry terminals at Dagenham and Dartford, and petroleum products handling facilities at Purfleet, Coryton and Canvey Island.

There is a speed limit of 8 knots (15 km/h) west of Wandsworth Bridge and in tributary creeks, and except for authorised vehicles, 12 knots (22 km/h) between Wandsworth Bridge and Margaretness.

The tidal river is used for leisure navigation. In London sections there are many sightseeing tours in tourist boats past riverside attractions such as the Houses of Parliament and the Tower of London, as well as regular riverboat services provided by London River Services. This section is not suitable for sporting activity because of the strong stream through the bridges.

Rowing has a significant presence upstream of Putney Bridge, while sailing takes place in the same area and also along the coasts of the Estuary. The annual Great River Race for traditional rowed craft takes place over the stretch from Greenwich to Ham. Thames meander challenges along the length of the Thames from Lechlade often pass through the London sections and finish well downstream, for example at Gravesend Pier.

The Grand Union Canal joins the river at Brentford, with a branch – the Regent's Canal – joining at Limehouse Basin. The other part of the canal network still connecting on the Tideway is the River Lea Navigation via Bow Lock.

Thames Reaches east of Westminster
Number	Name
Reach 1	Upper Pool, Lower Pool and Limehouse Reach
Reach 2	Limehouse, Greenwich and Blackwall Reach
Reach 3	Bugsby's and Woolwich Reach
Reach 4	Gallions and Barking Reach
Reach 5	Halfway and Erith Reach
Reach 6	Erith Reach, Erith Rands and Long Reach
Reach 7	Long Reach and Fiddler's Reach
Reach 8	Northfleet Hope
Reach 9	Gravesend Reach
Reach 10	The Lower Hope
Reach 11	Sea Reach

== Environment ==
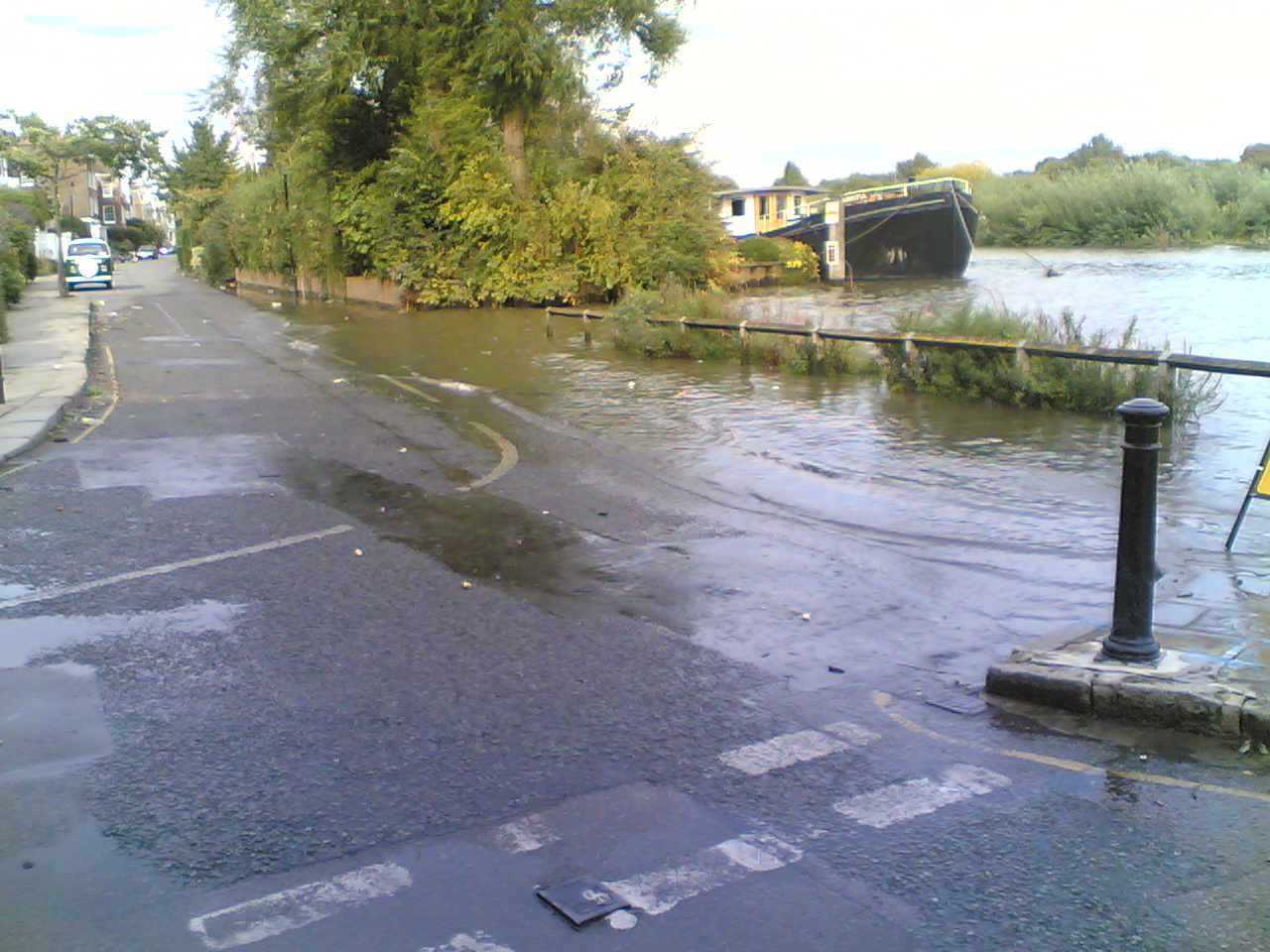
The River Thames flooding at Chiswick Lane South in 2006

Narrow low-lying belts beside the tidal section of the Thames regularly flood at spring tides, supporting brackish plants. One such example is at Chiswick Lane South, where the river, as pictured, overflows this road a few times per year. (Picture taken in 2006).

Although water quality has improved over the last 40 years and efforts to clean up the Tideway have led to the reintroduction of marine life and birds, the environment of the Tideway is still poor. Heavier rainfall in London causes overflows from pipes on the river banks from the standard type of sewer in the capital, the combined sewer. Around 39,000,000 m^{3} (3.9×10^{10} L) or 39 million tonnes of untreated sewage mixed with rainwater are released into the Tideway each year from sewage treatment works and combined sewer overflows (CSOs), averaging 106,849 m^{3} (106,849,000 L) per day or 106,849 tonnes per day. These CSOs can cause the deaths of marine life and health hazards for river users.

The Thames Tideway Scheme, under construction, aims to divert most of the overflow from sewers into a tunnel under the river.

== Thames Estuary ==
The Thames Estuary is bordered by the coast and the low-lying lands upstream between the mouth of the River Stour on the Essex/Suffolk border and The Swale in north Kent. It is now usually designated the Greater Thames Estuary and is one of the largest inlets on the coast of Great Britain. The water can rise by 4 metres moving at a speed of 8 miles per hour.

The estuary extends into London near Tower Bridge, and can be divided into the Outer Estuary up to the Swale at the west end of the Isle of Sheppey, and the Inner Estuary, designated the Thames Gateway above this point. The shore of the Outer Estuary consists of saltmarshes and mudflats, but there are manmade embankments along much of the route. Behind these, the land is cultivated or used for grazing. Parts of the Outer Estuary are on a major shipping route.

== Thames Gateway ==
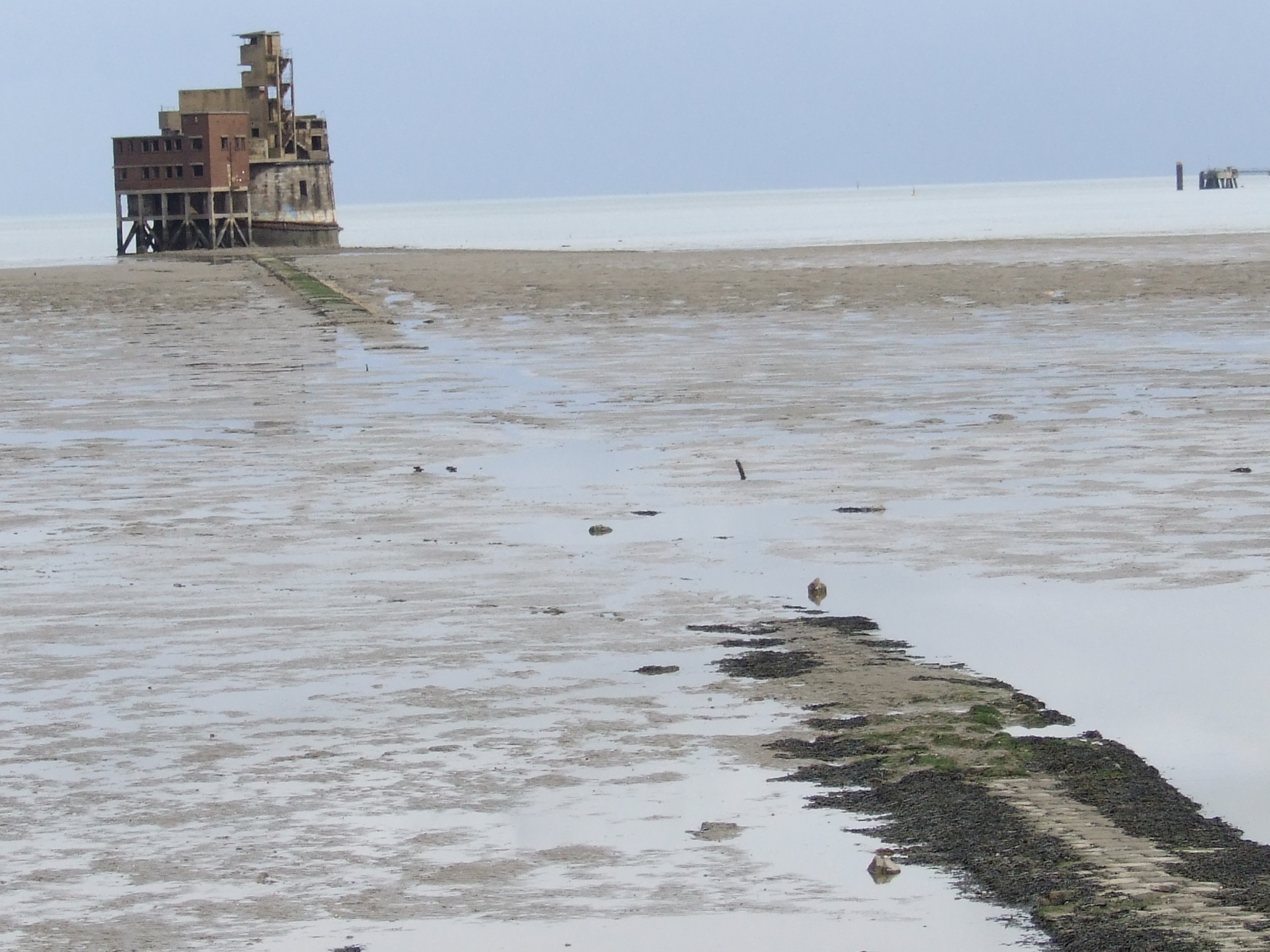
The Grain Tower (constructed in 1855) and causeway, Isle of Grain, seen at low tide, 2008

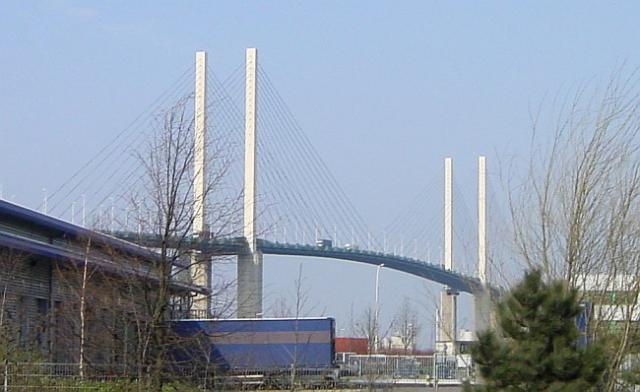
The Queen Elizabeth II Bridge; opened in October, 1991

The Gateway is some 70 kilometres (43 mi) long, stretching from the Isle of Sheppey to Limehouse in Tower Hamlets. Its boundary was drawn to capture the riverside strip that formerly hosted many land extensive industries, serving London and the South East. The decline of these industries has left a legacy of large scale dereliction and contaminated land, but an opportunity for major redevelopment. The area includes the London Docklands, Millennium Dome, London Riverside and Thames Barrier.

=== Major crossings ===
- Dartford Crossing including two Dartford Tunnels (1963 and 1980) and the cable-stayed Queen Elizabeth II Bridge (1991)
- Silvertown Tunnel (2025)
- Blackwall Tunnels (Alexander Binnie, 1897; second bore 1967)
- Jubilee line and Docklands Light Railway tunnels
- Greenwich foot tunnel (Alexander Binnie, 1902)
- Rotherhithe Tunnel (Maurice Fitzmaurice, 1908)

=== Tributaries ===
- Pitsea Creek, Mar Dyke and River Ingrebourne
- River Rom (lower reaches known as the Beam) and River Dart
- River Darent (tidal reach known as 'Dartford Creek')
- River Roding (tidal reach known as 'Barking Creek')
- River Lea or Lee (tidal reach known as 'Bow Creek')
- Ravensbourne (tidal reach known as 'Deptford Creek')

=== Islands and peninsulas ===
- Isle of Grain— actually a peninsula
- Two Tree Island
- Canvey Island
- Lower Horse Island
- Upper Horse Island
- Frog Island, Rainham
- Isle of Dogs — actually a peninsula

== Pool of London ==
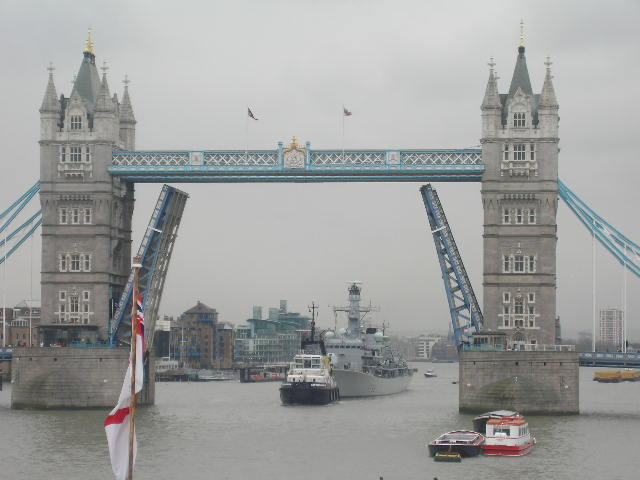
Tower Bridge open to admit HMS Northumberland in April, 2007

The Pool of London is divided into two parts, the Lower Pool and Upper Pool. The Lower Pool traditionally runs from the Cherry Garden Pier in Rotherhithe to Tower Bridge. The Upper Pool consists of the section between Tower Bridge and London Bridge. In the 18th and 19th centuries the river was lined with nearly continuous walls of wharves running for miles along both banks, and hundreds of ships moored in the river or alongside the quays. The lack of capacity in the Pool of London prompted landowners to build London's Docklands with enclosed docks with better security and facilities. The abrupt collapse of commercial traffic in the Thames due to the introduction of shipping containers and coastal deep-water ports in the 1960s emptied the Pool and led to all of the wharves being closed down. The Lower Pool area was extensively redeveloped in the 1980s and 1990s to create new residential and commercial neighbourhoods, often using converted warehouses. In the Upper Pool this provided scope for office development in the City of London and Southwark.

=== Major crossings ===
- Rotherhithe Tunnel (Maurice Fitzmaurice, 1908)
- Thames Tunnel (Wapping to Rotherhithe Tunnel) (Marc Brunel, 1843; the world's first underwater tunnel, now part of the East London Line)
- Tower Bridge (1894)

== Inner London ==
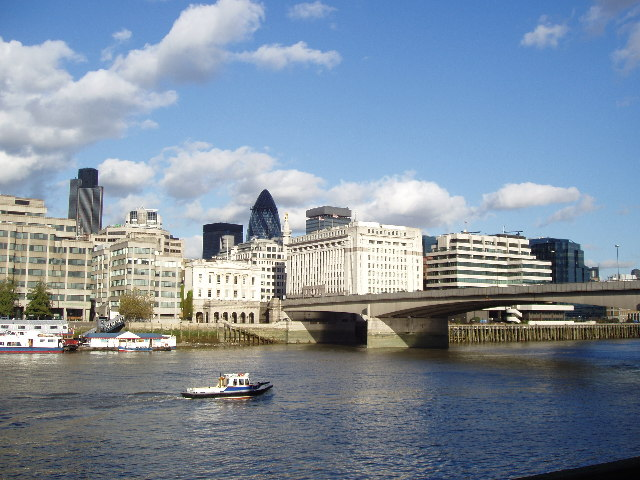
London Bridge with the Gherkin in the background

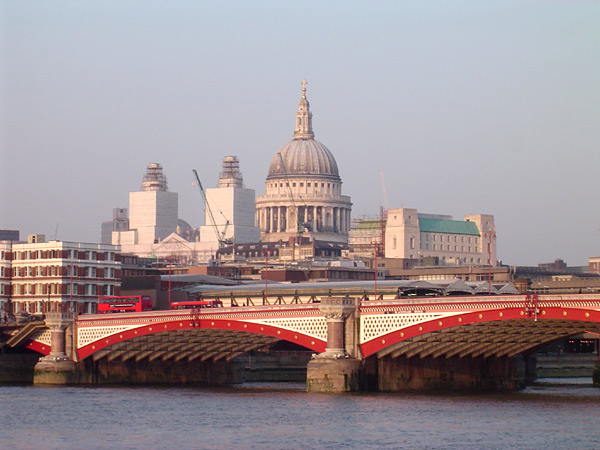
Blackfriars Bridge with St Paul's Cathedral behind

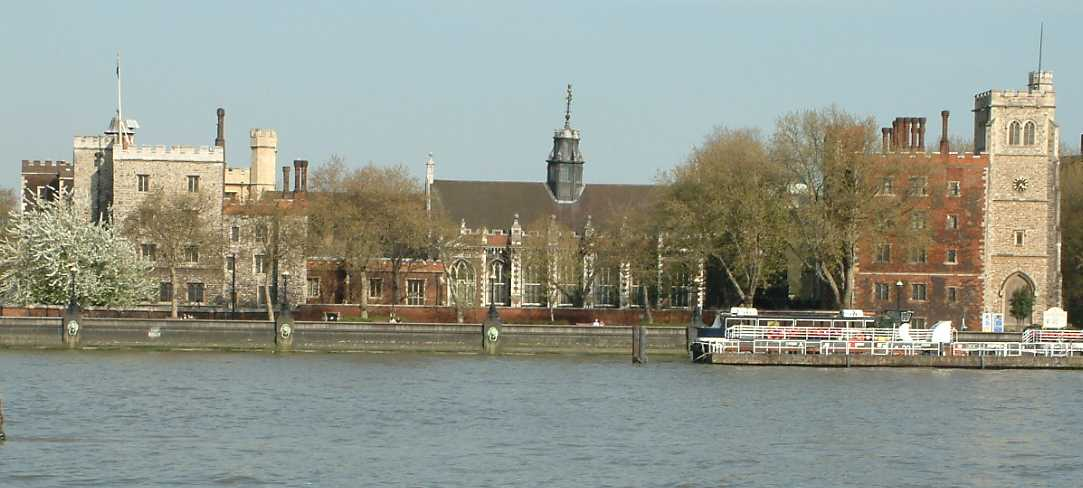
Lambeth Palace, photographed looking east across the River Thames.

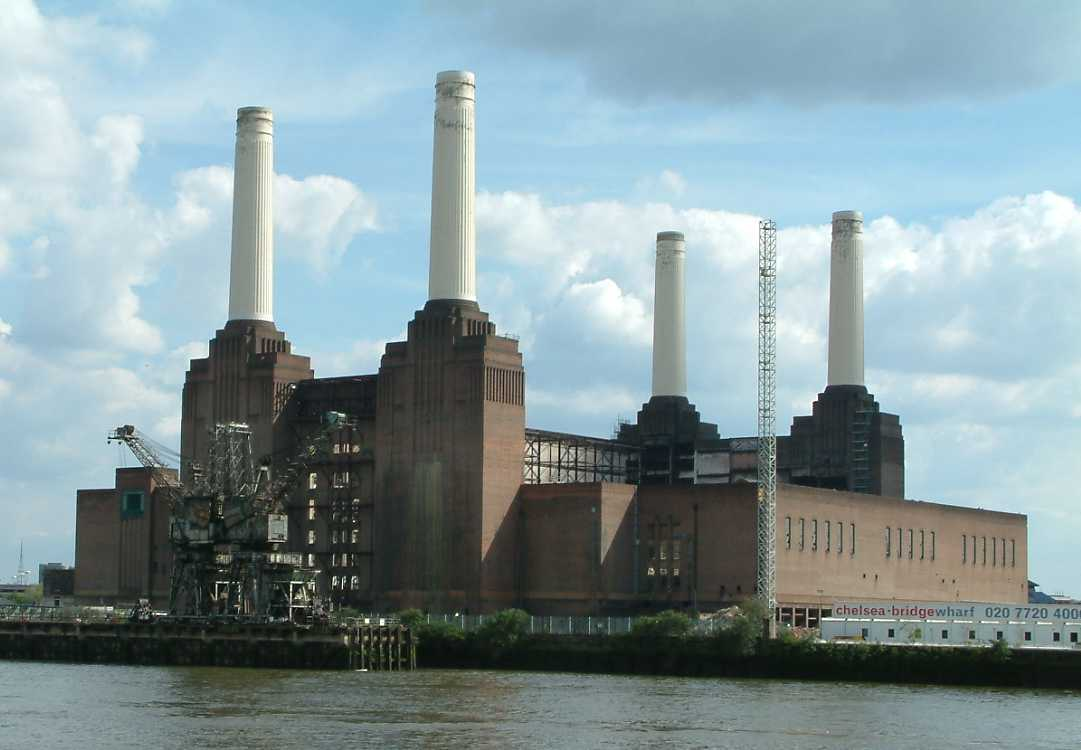
Battersea Power Station viewed from the north bank of the River Thames at Pimlico.

Between London Bridge and Putney Bridge, the river passes through Central London and some of the most famous landmarks.

On the north bank, the river passes (from east to west) Monument, St Paul's Cathedral, Inner Temple, Somerset House, Victoria Embankment, HMS President, HMS Wellington, Cleopatra's Needle, Charing Cross railway station, Norman Shaw Buildings, Houses of Parliament, Tate Britain, and Thames Embankment.

On the south bank, it passes Southwark Cathedral, St Saviour's Dock, Shakespeare's Globe, Tate Modern, Royal National Theatre, Royal Festival Hall, London Eye, Albert Embankment, County Hall, London, St Thomas' Hospital, Lambeth Palace, SIS Building and Battersea Power Station.

River boats carry tourists up down and across the river, and also provide a regular commuter service.

=== Major crossings ===
- Northern line, Waterloo & City line, Bakerloo line, Jubilee line, Victoria line, tunnels
- London Bridge (1973)
- Cannon Street Railway Bridge (1982)
- Southwark Bridge (1921)
- Millennium Bridge (2002)
- Blackfriars Railway Bridge (1886)
- Blackfriars Bridge (1869)
- Waterloo Bridge (1945) (the "women's bridge")
- Hungerford Footbridges (Golden Jubilee Bridges) (2002)
- Charing Cross (Hungerford) Bridge (1864)
- Westminster Bridge (1862)
- Lambeth Bridge (1932)
- Vauxhall Bridge (1906)
- Grosvenor Bridge (Victoria Railway Bridge) (1859)
- Chelsea Bridge (1937)
- Albert Bridge (1873)
- Battersea Bridge (Sir Joseph Bazalgette, 1890) (Henry Holland, 1771)
- Battersea Railway Bridge (1863)
- Wandsworth Bridge (1938)
- Fulham Railway Bridge (1889)

=== Tributaries ===
(culverted tributaries largely converted to sewers are marked ‡)

- Walbrook‡
- River Fleet‡
- Neckinger‡ (save for mouth)
- Tyburn‡
- Westbourne‡
- Counter's Creek (also known as 'Chelsea Creek')‡ (save for mouth)
- Effra‡
- Wandle

== Outer London ==
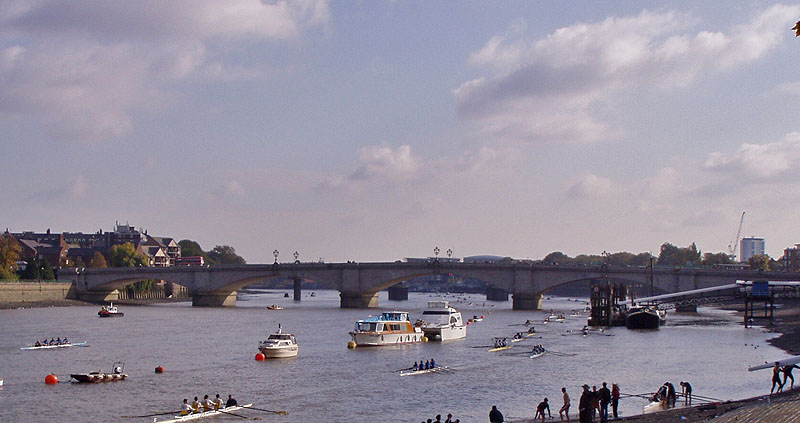
Putney Bridge

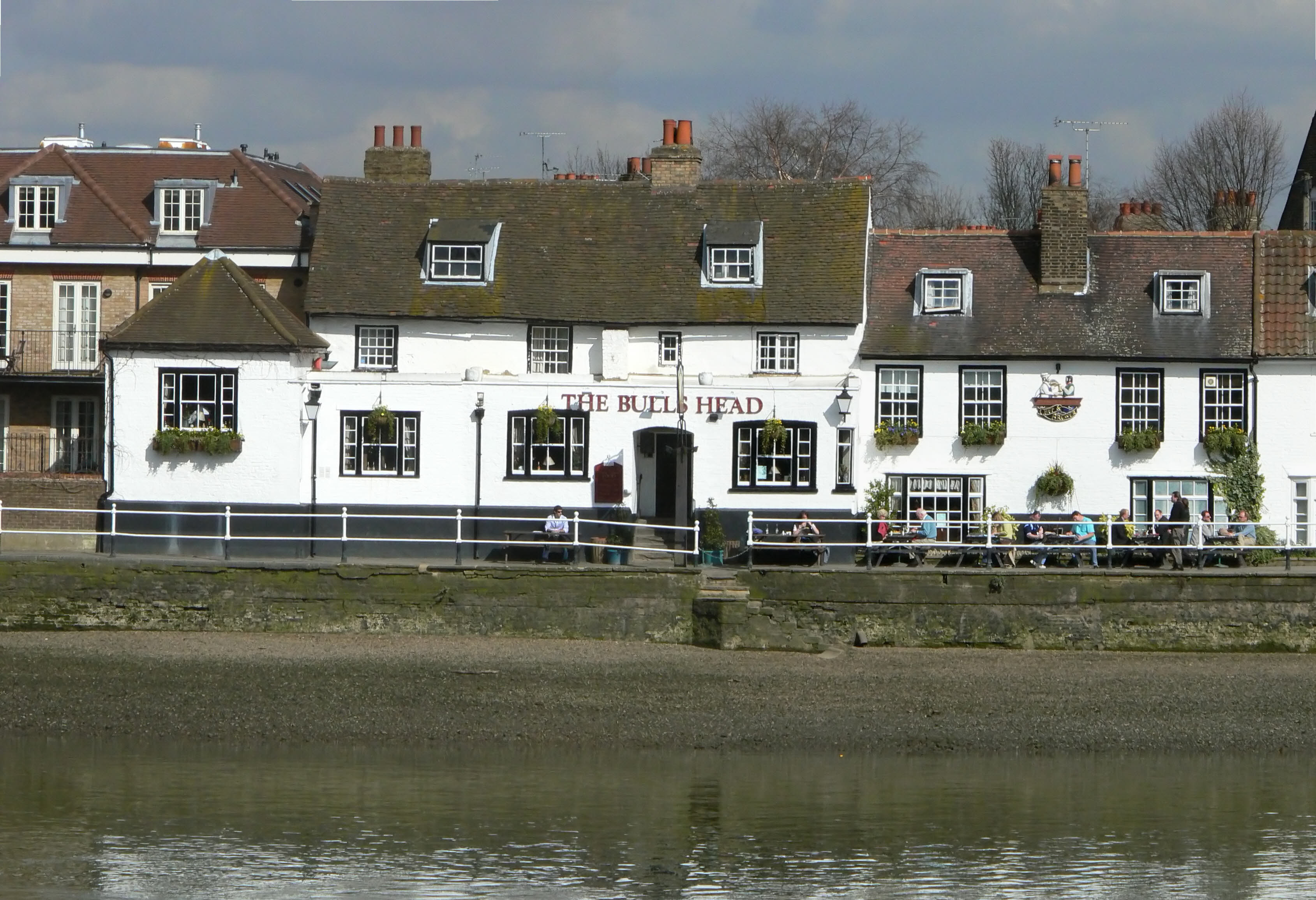
Historic riverside pub, Strand-on-the-Green, Chiswick

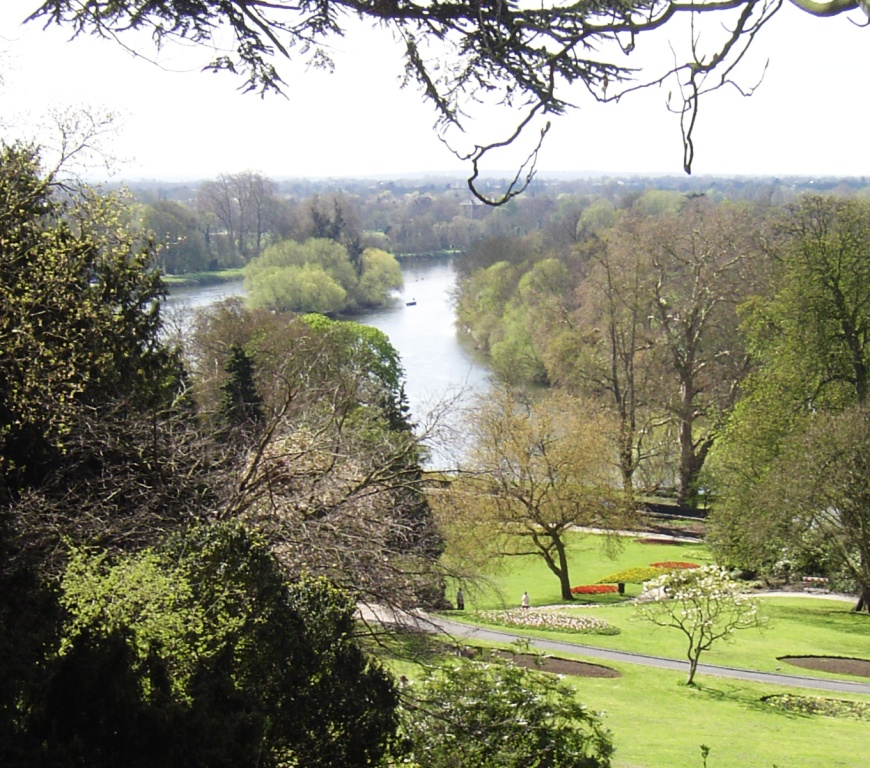
View from Richmond Hill, Richmond.

From Putney Bridge to Teddington Lock, the river passes through inner and outer suburbs such as Hammersmith, Chiswick, Barnes, Richmond on Thames and Ham. This part of the Tideway is home to most of London's rowing clubs, and is the venue for training and racing throughout the year. The Championship Course over which The Boat Race and many other events are run, stretches from Putney to Mortlake.

=== Major crossings ===
- Putney Bridge (Sir Joseph Bazalgette, 1886) (Phillips & Ackworth, 1729)
- Hammersmith Bridge (Sir Joseph Bazalgette, 1887)
- Barnes Railway Bridge (1849)
- Chiswick Bridge (1933)
- Kew Railway Bridge (1869)
- Kew Bridge (John Wolfe-Barry, 1903)
- Richmond Lock and Footbridge (1894)
- Twickenham Bridge (1933)
- Richmond Railway Bridge (1848)
- Richmond Bridge (1777)

=== Tributaries ===
- Beverley Brook
- Stamford Brook‡
- Brent
- Duke of Northumberland's River (manmade)
- Crane
- Sudbrook

=== Islands ===
- Chiswick Eyot, Chiswick
- Oliver's Island, Strand-on-the-Green
- Brentford Ait, Brentford
- Lot's Ait, Brentford
- Isleworth Ait, Isleworth
- Corporation Island, Richmond
- Glover's Island, Twickenham
- Eel Pie Island, Twickenham
- Swan Island, Twickenham

== See also ==
- Geography of London
- Islands in the River Thames
- List of crossings of the River Thames
- List of locations in the Port of London
- Locks and weirs on the River Thames
- Rowing on the River Thames
- Subterranean rivers of London
