= Jack de Leon (theatre manager) =

British theatre manager, impresario and playwright (1902–1956)

- Born: 12 August 1902; Colón, Panama
- Died: 21 September 1956 (aged 54); Kew, Surrey, England
- Spouse: Beatrice Lewisohn (m. 1921)
- Relatives: Delia de Leon (sister)

Jack de Leon (pseudonym Noel Doon; 12 August 1902 – 21 September 1956) was a Panamanian-born British theatre manager and impresario who is known for opening the Q Theatre with his wife, Beatrice. He is also known for writing plays himself.

== Early life ==
Jack de Leon was born on 12 August 1902 in Colón, Panama, the second child of May Miriam (née Maduro) and Michael de Leon, a merchant. The family was Sephardic Jewish. As a child, he developed a love for drama from playing with a puppet theatre. In 1911, the family moved to London, settling in West Hampstead. He was educated at University College School in Hampstead. de Leon was articled to the solicitor firm Indermaur and Brown after brief stints in the import trade and publishing.

On 30 August 1921, he married actress and drama school founder Beatrice Lewisohn at St John's Wood Synagogue.

== Career ==
After some encouragement from Beatrice's mother and financial help from his sister, Delia, de Leon leased the Prince's Hall in Brentford in 1924. It was renamed the Q Theatre and reopened on 26 December 1924 with the comedy The Young Person in Pink by Gertrude E. Jennings, where Beatrice made her professional debut. Despite the production's success in London's West End, it was de Leon's intention to specialise in new plays in the hope that they would be taken up by West End managers after a week-long trial at the Q, a policy which proved successful for the theatre.

Under the pseudonym Noel Doon and in collaboration with Steve Donohue, de Leon wrote his first play The Man at Six and it was produced at the Q on 16 January 1928.

In March 1929, the de Leons relinquished control of the Q Theatre after drawing criticism of their contractual arrangements with new writers and an array of practical problems. The same year, alongside his sister Delia, he managed the newly opened Duchess Theatre. Two years later, the couple renewed their association with the Q when Beatrice reopened the theatre for a series of plays performed by her drama school students. Although still closely linked with the Q Theatre, de Leon became increasingly involved on his own projects as a playwright and an impresario. Again collaborating with Steve Donohue on The Silent Witness in April 1930.

== Personal life and death ==
Jack and Beatrice de Leon had one child, Jean.

de Leon died from a heart attack at his mother's home, 254 Kew Road in Kew, on 21 September 1956, aged 53. He was cremated at Golders Green Crematorium two days later.
