= Lot's Ait =

Island in the River Thames, England

Coordinates: 51°29′05″N 00°17′54″W

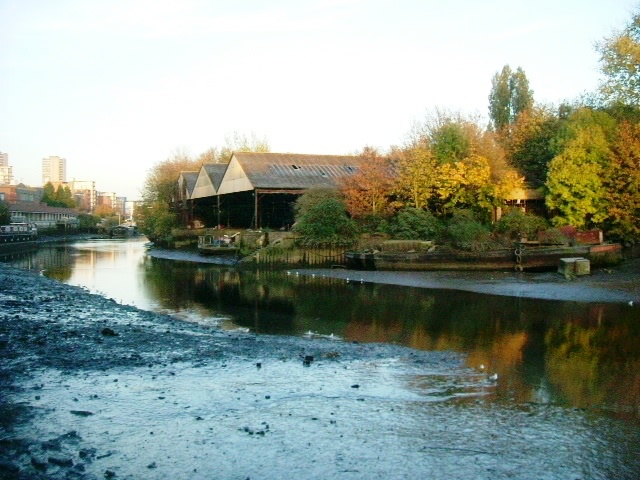

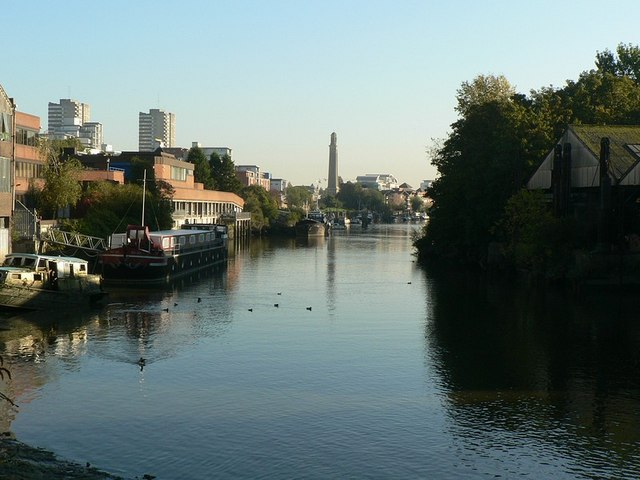

Lot's Ait is a 1.724-acre (0.7 ha) ait (river island) in the Thames. It is on the Tideway near Brentford, in the London Borough of Hounslow, England.

== History ==
Lot's Ait, covering 1.724 acres (0.7 ha), has a very narrow divide from larger, downstream Brentford Ait. It was for centuries used for growing of grass and osiers: basket willows, used for basketry, furniture, and cart-making, as well as cattle fodder. It was once known as Barbel Island being a fruitful area for fishing. It contained a yard where barges were repaired until 1980, when it was sold. It acquired a wild character with naturalised willows, rotting boats and rusting dock roofs and became a haven for wildlife. In 2002, the island was offered for sale with outline planning permission for a restaurant, a leisure facility and boat storage. It is accessible by footbridge, at low tide in sturdy boots across the thick, shifting mud bed of the channel against the Brentford shore, and by water from the slipway Goats Wharf off Brentford High Street.

In 2011, a lease on the island was granted to a local company, John's Boat Works, which commenced boat building works on the island for the first time in over 30 years and put it back into use. In January 2012, a new footbridge, Dahlia Bridge, was installed to link the island to the Brentford bank of the Thames at Smith Hill. It was designed by Beckett Rankine and built and installed by MSO Marine.

== In popular culture ==
- Film scenes in
  - The African Queen
  - Stratton
- Lots Ait boatworks featured in an episode of George Clarke's Amazing Spaces
- Site of the art performance "Offshore Rig" (1987) by Bow Gamelan Ensemble, which was the subject of an Alter Image (channel 4) documentary.

== See also ==
- Islands in the River Thames

== Notes ==
Next island upstream		Next island downstream
Isleworth Ait	Lot's Ait	Brentford Ait
