= Isleworth Ait =

Island in the River Thames in England

Coordinates: 51.4690°N 0.3207°W

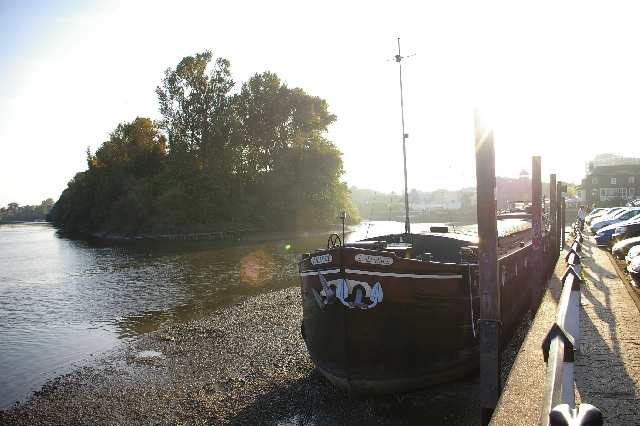
Isleworth Ait and a Thames barge

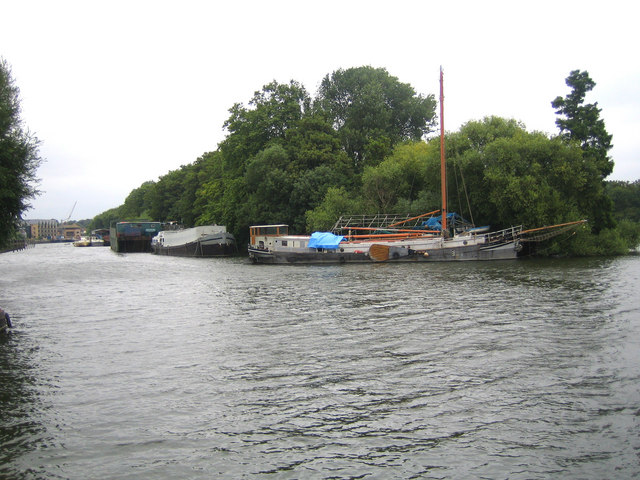
The southern tip of the ait

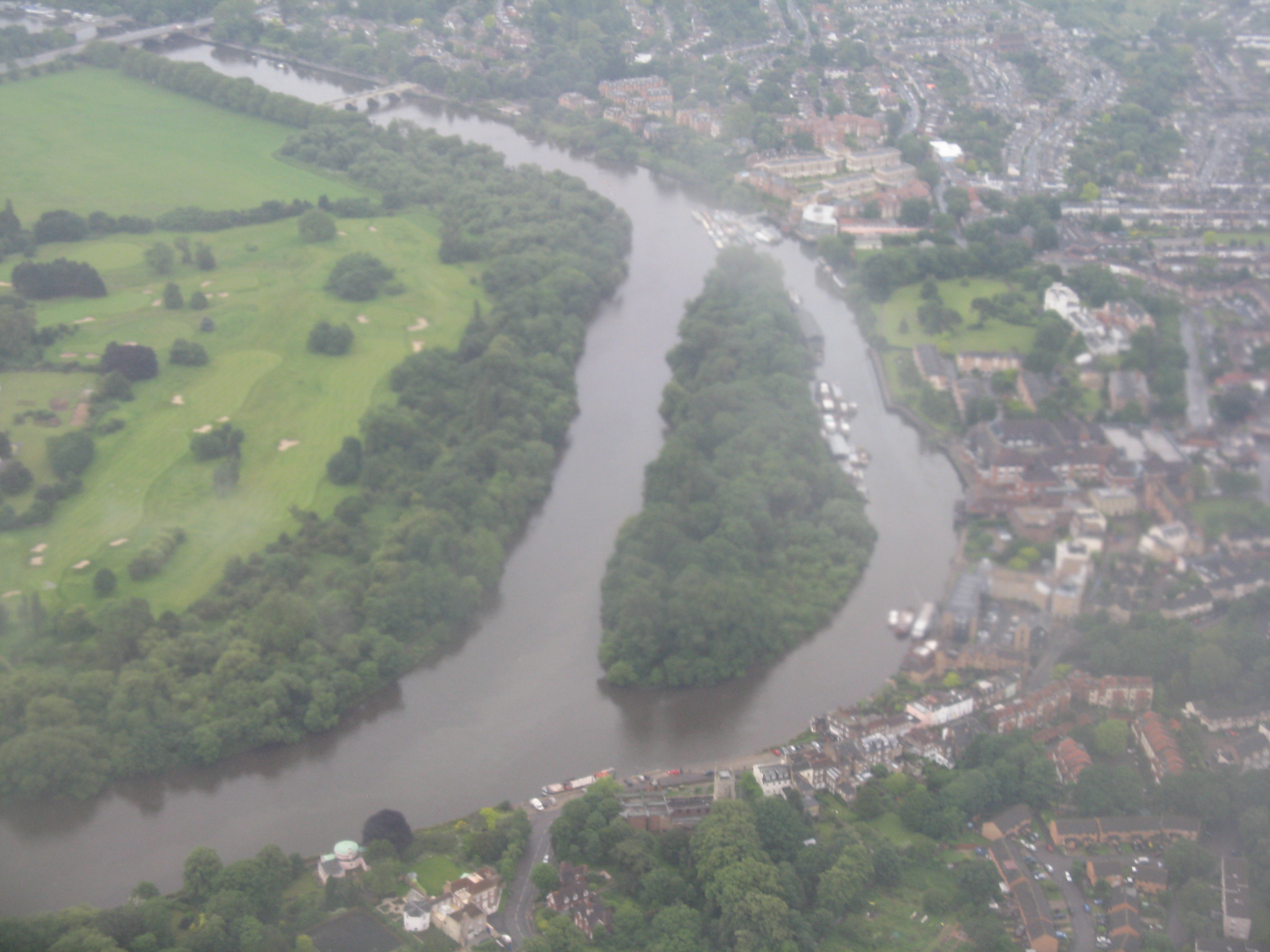
Isleworth Ait from the air

Isleworth Ait is a London Wildlife Trust nature reserve, and is a teardrop-shaped island in the River Thames in England, between 3.5-hectare (8.6-acre) and 9.370-acre (3.792 ha). The long ait is on the Tideway facing Old Isleworth and the towpath alongside the Royal Mid-Surrey Golf Club. These places are in the London Boroughs of Hounslow and Richmond upon Thames. The island faces Heron's Place and a number of commercial buildings. It is not open to the public, other than on organised event or volunteering days.

== Wildlife ==
Isleworth Ait is covered by densely packed trees, and provides a sanctuary for a variety of wildlife. It floods regularly, but is home to more than 57 species of bird life, including the tree-creeper, kingfisher and heron. Two rare species of air-breathing land gastropods also live on the island, the two-lipped door snail Balea biplicata and the German hairy snail Pseudotrichia rubiginosa, as well as several rare species of beetles. This variety of unusual wildlife makes the island one of the London Wildlife Trust's most remarkable reserves. It is a local nature reserve and part of The River Thames and tidal tributaries Site of Metropolitan Importance for Nature Conservation.

== Trade ==
Isleworth Ait was once a centre for the production of osier - a willow which used to be harvested on the island to weave baskets to carry fruit and vegetables grown in Middlesex to the markets in London. Much of the island has resulted from five pre-19th century neighbouring islands, overall covering a broader area and partially reduced by river erosion intensified by passing boat traffic.

== Nearby tributaries ==
The River Crane flows into the Thames southwest of the island and its distributary to feed former mills and the lake in Syon Park, the Duke of Northumberland's River, to the northwest.

== Ownership ==
Thames Water owns the island, which houses the outfall from the Mogden Sewage Treatment Works draining outer West London plus Wraysbury and Spelthorne – effluent of more than 2,000,000 residents in all. Most of the outfall has always meant to have been treated. The local setup is the sewerage catchment mainly has separate surface water drainage (drains for rainwater to flow into rivers and soakaways) which thus keeps untreated storm discharges from sewerage works low by not sending storm water to them. Such a system is more "desirable" and "preferable" though costlier to build. The older system alternative is that of combined sewers, having succeeded many former rivers in London. Excess discharges from all those older outfalls to the east are to be about 99% collected by a 2025 completion date tunnel. The Mogden works, which is a consolidation of many across its catchment, for a complete approach towards cleaning London's main watercourse, is being upgraded from the late 2010s to the early 2020s after billions of litres annually of untreated outfall from the island.

The Metropolitan Water Board bought the ait from the Duke of Northumberland in the 1930s; visitor access is granted to local volunteers of the London Wildlife Trust.

== See also ==
- Islands in the River Thames

Next island upstream	River Thames	Next island downstream
Corporation Island	Isleworth Ait	Lot's Ait
