= Brentford Ait =

Island in the River Thames, England

Coordinates: 51°29′11″N 0°17′39″W

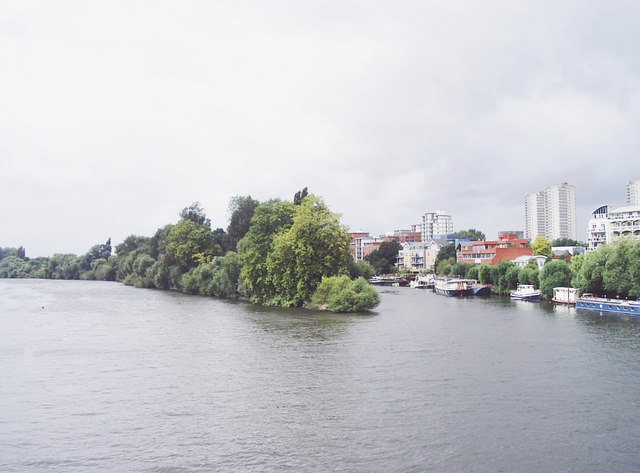
Brentford Ait seen from Kew Bridge

Brentford Ait is a long 4.572-acre (1.9 ha) uninhabited ait (river island) in the River Thames, without buildings, on the Tideway near Brentford in London, England.

== Ownership and size ==
It is administered by the London Borough of Richmond upon Thames and Port of London Authority. Its west part was last accurately measured as 1.956 acres (0.8 ha); its east 2.616 acres (1.1 ha) being longer and the same width. The ait has a gap in the middle known as Hog Hole which is apparent at lower high tides, dividing the ait into "upper" and "lower" sections which are awash with water at mean high water springs.

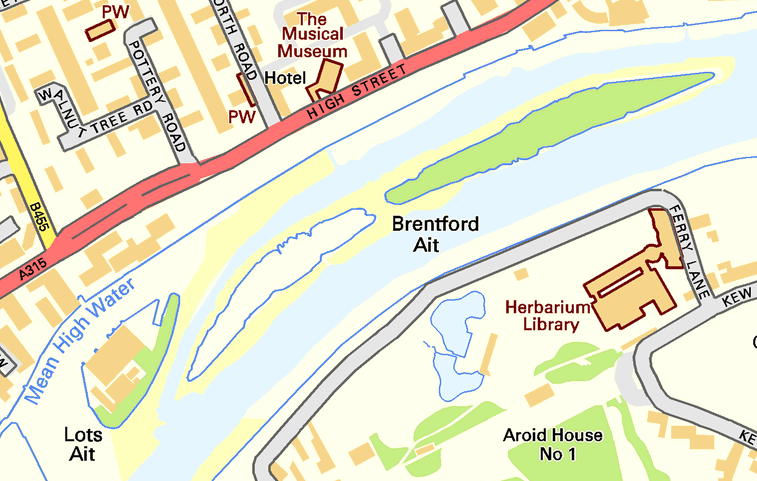
Map of Brentford and Lot's Aits

The ait was also known as Makenshaw, Mattenshaw or Twigg Ait. For reasons likely connected with ownership the ancient parish of Kew in Surrey included Brentford Ait in its history; the London Borough of Hounslow governs neighbouring Lot's Ait separated only by thick, shifting mud at low tide from Brentford whereas channels beside the dual ait are dredged.

In the 18th century the ait was inhabited; a main building was a latter-day notorious pub, the Swan or Three Swans; its trade was ended in 1796. On the Brentford bank, the Swan Steps lead down to the river at the east end of the long and narrow park, Waterman's Park. From these the crossing to the pub ran.

The ait has borne large trees since the 1920s to screen Brentford's gasworks (since removed) from the view of Kew Gardens. The ait is covered by willows and alder and is a bird sanctuary with a significant heronry.

== See also ==
- Islands in the River Thames

== Bibliography ==
- Bolton, Diane K; Croot, Patricia E C; Hicks, M A (1982). "Chiswick: Introduction". In Baker, T F T; Elrington, C R (eds.). A History of the County of Middlesex: Volume 7: Acton, Chiswick, Ealing and Brentford, West Twyford, Willesden. Oxford: Oxford University Press for the University of London, Institute of Historical Research. pp. 50–51. OCLC 59178433.
- Hatts, Leigh (2005). The Thames Path: From the Sea to the Source (2nd ed.). Milnthorpe: Cicerone Press. ISBN 978-1-85284-436-3. OCLC 276222230.
- Walker, Duncan. "Brentford Ait – Wild, Beautiful & Notorious". Brentford in Literature. Brentford Dock Right Now. Archived from the original on 4 October 2015.

Next island upstream	River Thames	Next island downstream
Lot's Ait	Brentford Ait	Oliver's Island
