= Kew Bridge Studios =

British film studio

- Interactive map of the Kew Bridge Studios area

General information
- Location: Brentford, England, Kew Bridge Court, Brentford, London, W4 3BF
- Coordinates: 51.489000°N 0.286500°W
- Opening: 1919
- Closed: 1924

The Kew Bridge Studios were a British film studio located in Kew Bridge, Brentford, west London which operated from 1919 to 1924. The site had originally been a theatre, but due to the rapid expansion of the British film industry after the First World War it switched to filmmaking as the existing studios were overspilling. The studios hosted a number of independent film-makers during the silent era, including Walter West and Guy Newall.

The studios were hit by the rapid fall in the number of films being released due to the Slump of 1924 and by competition from better-equipped studios. After the studios closed down they were converted into the celebrated Q Theatre which occupied the site until the 1950s.

== Bibliography ==
- Low, Rachael. History of the British Film, 1918–1929. George Allen & Unwin, 1971.
- Warren, Patricia. British Film Studios: An Illustrated History. Batsford, 2001.
