= Glover's Island =

Island in the River Thames in England

Coordinates: 51°27′00″N 00°18′20″W

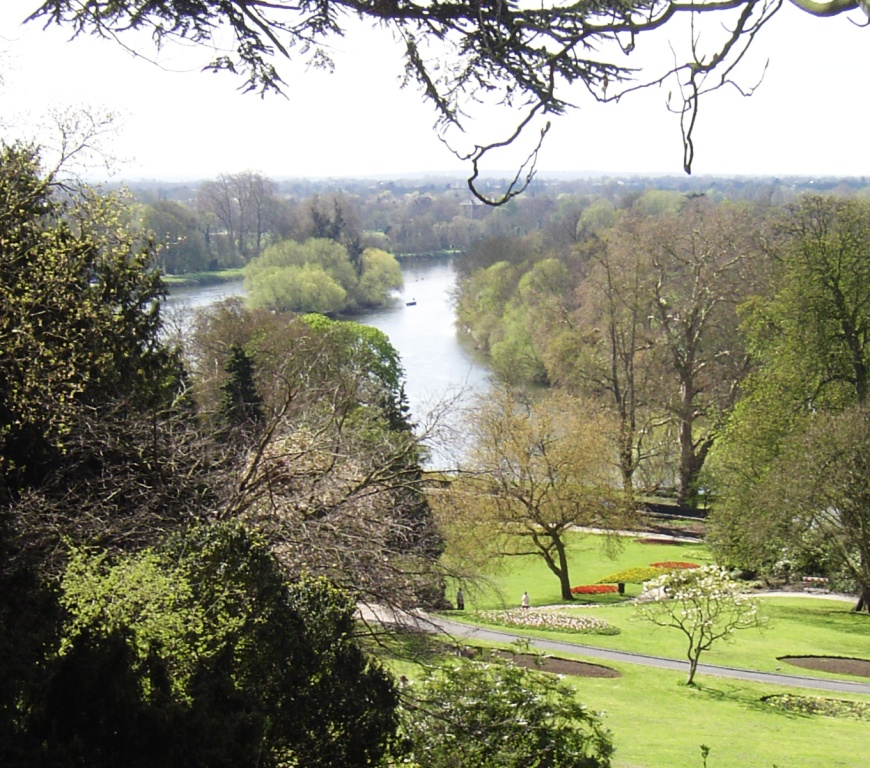
Glover's Island from Richmond Hill, Richmond

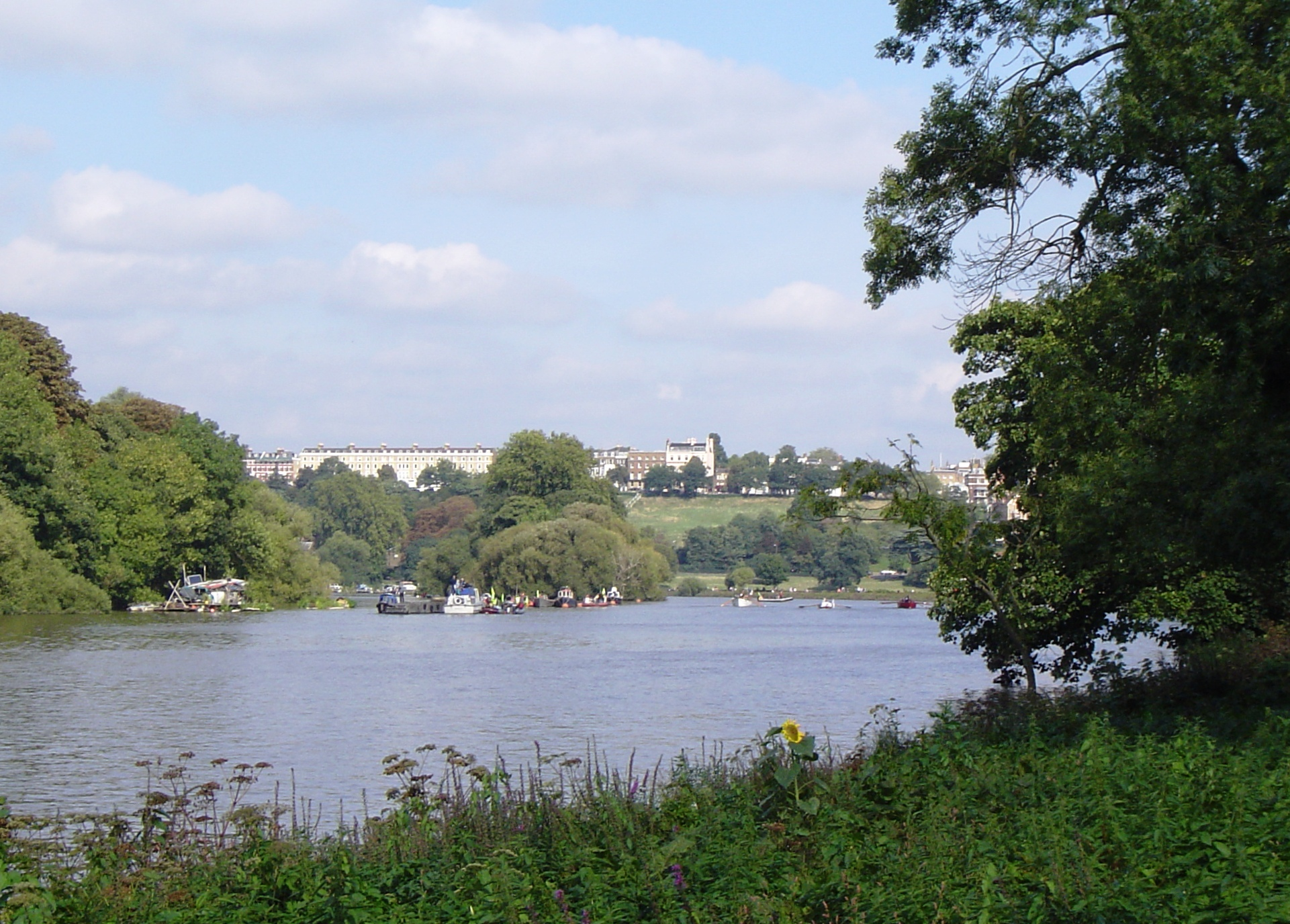
Glover's Island from upstream with Richmond Hill beyond

Glover’s Island (originally called Petersham Ait and also known as Clam Island) is a small island in a tree-lined section of the Thames River, known as Horse Reach on the tidal Thames, between Richmond Lock and Teddington Lock in the Borough of Richmond upon Thames, London, England.

== Description ==
The tree-covered islet has been precisely measured as 0.536 acres (0.217 ha) above mean high water springs.

== History ==
In 1872 the island, then called Petersham Ait, was bought by a Richmond-based waterman named Joseph Glover for £70 (equivalent to £7,000 in 2025); he later advertised it for resale in 1895. Clementine trees were planted on the island in 1897. Sir John Whittaker Ellis, Mayor of Richmond, had a house along the aristocratic row on the place with the highest, definitive Thames Arcadia view. This is on the steep terrace of Richmond Hill above public pleasure gardens. Ellis declined to buy the island at £5,000 (equivalent to £568,000 in 2025), so suggested that the Richmond Corporation should be approached. The view itself had been painted by John Wootton in about 1740 as A View From Richmond Hill. An English Arcadia.

The Amenities Committee considered the proposal on 2 April 1895 and decided –

"That while the Committee think it desirable that the Island should be acquired for the Corporation if it could be obtained at a reasonable price, they are of the opinion that in view of the sum now named, it would be useless to enter into any negotiation for its purchase."

Trying again in 1898, Glover caused a furore by putting the islet up for auction and suggesting it could be sold to Pears soap to erect a giant advertising hoarding. Glover used this threat to vex the corporation, offering it to them for £4,000 but although the corporation wanted to buy the island, it was felt that there was no justification in spending such a large sum of money out of its funds.

There then followed a lengthy debate and correspondence in the local press about preserving the view from Richmond Hill and suggestions were made that the purchase should be funded jointly by public subscription and the corporation. By September, only £50 had been given to the public fund; disclosure of Glover's purchase at £70 did not help.

The auction took place on 21 September but the highest bid was only £200. An unnamed resident had offered Glover £1,000 for the island (which he then intended to present to the corporation), but Glover refused to sell.

In 1900 Max Waechter of Terrace House, Richmond Hill, bought it for £1,600 and conveyed it to the council having that body covenant, with intent to bind its successors, it was never to be developed.

== In art ==
Walter Sickert's 1932 oil painting Glover's Island from Richmond Hill, is held at the Yale Center for British Art.

== See also ==
- Islands in the River Thames

== Sources ==
"Richmond Libraries’ Local Studies Collection"

Next island upstream	River Thames	Next island downstream
Eel Pie Island	Glover's Island	Corporation Island
