= Delia de Leon =

British actress (1901–1993)

- Delia de Leon in 1932
- Born: 10 February 1901; Colón, Panama
- Died: 21 January 1993 (aged 91); Kew, London, England
- Occupation: Actress
- Relatives: Jack de Leon (brother)

Delia de Leon (10 February 1901 – 21 January 1993) was a British actress and co-founder of the Q Theatre. She was a devoted disciple of the Indian spiritual master Meher Baba and was the subject of a film by musician Pete Townshend.

== Early life ==
Delia de Leon, the eldest child of May Miriam (née Maduro) and Michael de Leon, was born on 10 February 1901 in Colón, Panama. The family was Sephardi Jewish. In 1909, she was sent to Jamaica to a boarding school run by English women. In 1911, the de Leon family moved to London, settling in West Hampstead.

== Career ==
In 1923, de Leon, along with her sister-in-law Beatrice de Leon, founded the London Academy of Dramatic Art. The next year, de Leon provided financial support for her brother Jack and Beatrice to open the Q Theatre. In 1929, alongside Jack, she managed the newly opened Duchess Theatre.

Between 1925 and 1935, she appeared in multiple productions at the Q Theatre, initially under the name of Delia Delvina. She was a part of the cast of The Children of the Moon when it transferred from the Q Theatre to the Royalty Theatre. de Leon received acclaim for her performance in Walter Hackett's The Barton Mystery, which later transferred to the West End.

== Spirituality ==
At a production of the operetta The White Horse Inn at the London Coliseum, de Leon met Indian spiritual master Meher Baba. She would later describe the impact this meeting had on her, stating it was like "as if someone had taken a hammer and knocked me on the head... During that week I went about like one in a dream: I was stunned with the wonder of Baba, nothing else existed for me." She became a disciple of his and began a correspondence with him from 1931 until his death in 1969.

During the early thirties, de Leon, along with dancer Margaret Craske and Kitty Davy, became known as "The Frivolous Three" and "Kimco" due to their increasing involvement with Baba.

In 1962, de Leon compiled a booklet of Baba's sayings named Sparks.

In 1974, musician Pete Townshend, a fellow Meher Baba follower, released a film titled Delia, dedicated to de Leon and Baba.

== Later life and death ==
In 1991, de Leon released her autobiography The Ocean of Love.

She lived with her sister-in-law, Beatrice, until Beatrice's death in 1991. On 21 January 1993, de Leon died in Kew, at the age of 91. She was cremated at Mortlake Crematorium. She never married.
