= Henry Muhrman =

American painter

Henry Muhrman (January 24, 1854 – October 30, 1916) was an American landscape and figure painter in oils, pastel and watercolor, who worked mainly in Europe.

== Early life ==
Muhrman was born in Cincinnati, Ohio, of German parentage. He studied at Cincinnati Art Academy and, from 1876 to 1878, at the Munich Academy when he began to study watercolor painting.

== Professional career ==
Muhrman lived in the United States from 1878 to 1883, when he settled in London, where he became a follower of James Abbott McNeill Whistler, specializing in moody and poetic pastels. Muhrman remained a presence in American art, exhibiting to great acclaim at the Chicago World’s Fair in 1893, when he was awarded a medal. He worked much on Hampstead Heath, along the River Thames near Chiswick and at Hastings. His first one-man exhibition was at London's Dowdeswell Galleries in 1890. He moved to Paris in 1899 and to Meissen, Germany in 1901, and became a member of the Munich Secession and the Berlin Secession.

Reporting on an exhibition at the New Gallery in Regent Street, London by the International Society of Sculptors, Painters and Gravers, the Evening Post, New York City, referred to the "most tragic Impressions of Meissen In pastel by Mr. Muhrman".

== Death and legacy ==
Muhrmann died at Meissen.

His oil painting Kew Bridge, painted in about 1898 when the artist was living in Gunnersbury, is now in the Tate Gallery's collection in London.

Of his watercolors, Composition is at the Brooklyn Museum in New York and Artist Seated on a Sand Bank is at the Museum of Fine Arts, Boston.

His pastel drawing The Little Bridge is at the McLean Museum and Art Gallery, Greenock, Scotland.
