= Lucrecia de León =

Spanish seer (born 1568)

Lucrecia de León (October 1568 – after 1595) was a Spanish woman who claimed to have experienced prophetic dreams. After these dreams were recorded and analysed to predict the future of Spain, the Spanish Inquisition arrested her on the orders of Philip II of Spain in 1590.

== Early life ==
Lucrecia de León was born in October 1568 in Madrid to Ana Ordoñez and solicitor Alonso Franco de León, who worked as a banking administrator to Philip II of Spain's court. She was the eldest of five children, all of whom survived childhood. They were raised in the parish of San Sebastián in Madrid, where they rented a ground-floor apartment owned by the Duchess of Feria. According to her family, Lucrecia claimed to have experienced visions from her early childhood. Despite being a middle-class family, the female León family members undertook odds jobs and housed borders in order to get by. One of Lucrecia's jobs included going door-to-door selling bolts of cloth and gathering herbs with her mother at their local meadows and the banks of the Manzanares river. She also briefly worked in the royal household.

== Dreams ==
In 1587, a family friend who learned of her alleged visions informed nobleman Alonso de Mendoza, who had an interest in the occult. Mendoza was fascinated and arranged to record Lucrecia's dreams daily. Two clergyman would sit with her and transcribe her description of her dreams from the night before. After they were transcribed, Mendoza then compared them to Biblical passages to predict Spain's future. After Mendoza's findings were shared, public interest in Lucrecia grew, as well as the attention of Spanish church authorities. When Mendoza had to leave for Toledo, he convinced Fray Lucas de Allende to continue the transcribing. Lucrecia was said to have been hesistant to have her dreams transcribed in 1588, but was encouraged by her mother "not to be afraid" and to continue with it. Her mother soon became her promoter. The king's council of state member and prior of St. John of Jerusalem military order, Hernado de Toledo, was among her patrons.

In October 1589, she met secretary Diego de Vitores Texeda, who was employed by her confessor to transcribe her dreams. On 20 February 1590, according to Vitores, the two "gave to each other sworn words and promises of marriage after which they treated each other like man and wife and knew each other carnally, although they did not speak about it to anyone". However, Lucrecia was already pregnant at the time of the vow exchange.

== Arrest ==
On 13 May 1590, Lucrecia claimed she dreamed of a man warning her that Judgment Day was coming and that if Philip II of Spain had been more pious then it would have been prevented. After the failure of the Spanish Armada, Philip II faced increased pressure from his rivals and wary of Lucrecia's influence with his courtiers, ordered the Spanish Inquisition to arrest her due to her implication that he was unfit to rule. They arrived at her home to arrest her on 25 May, before taking her to the Inquisition's secret prison in Toledo and to stand trial. The transcripts of her dreams were also seized. During her first appearance before the Inquisition's judge on 4 June, she was said to have been "six or seven months pregnant".

== Sources ==
- Kagan, Richard L. (22 June 1990). Lucrecia's Dreams: Politics and Prophecy in Sixteenth-Century Spain. University of California Press. ISBN 9780520916593.
- Osbourne, Roger (2001). The Dreamer of the Calle de San Salvador: Visions of Sedition and Sacrilege in Sixteenth-Century Spain. Random House. ISBN 9780712664974.
