= Perla de Leon =

American artist and photographer

- Born: 1952 (age 73–74); New York, NY
- Known for: Photography
- Notable work: "South Bronx Spirit" Photo Series
- Website: http://fotograficaproductions.com\

Perla de Leon (born New York, NY, 1952), is an American artist and photographer from New York City. Her most famous work is her "South Bronx Spirit" photo series, documenting the urban decay of the South Bronx due to its total economic collapse during the 1970s.

== Personal life ==
A New Yorker with Puerto Rican roots, de Leon grew up in the multi-cultural neighborhood of Hamilton Heights in Harlem. During the second half of the 20th century, white flight, economic changes, and the construction of the Cross Bronx Expressway led to racial tensions and rising rates of crime, decreasing property values and further disadvantaging the poor working classes of the South Bronx. De Leon was convinced that the mainstream media was not accurately portraying what was happening to the South Bronx and its people during her upbringing, and this led her to capture the daily lives of the children and families who still remained in the decaying neighborhoods using photographs.

De Leon also considers herself an activist, and in 2018 she joined forces with LuminAid and University of Puerto Rico students to distribute solar lights to remote areas of the island following Hurricane Maria in 2017.

== "South Bronx Spirit" Photo Series (1970s - 1980s) ==
Throughout the 1970s and 1980s, de Leon used photographs to document the communities of the South Bronx, occupied predominantly by African Americans and Latinos. These images became her "South Bronx Spirit" photo series, which offered a counter-narrative to the negative stereotypes aimed at the residents of the South Bronx after the beginning of its economic collapse. Her photographs document the damage to the African American and Latino neighborhoods by the construction of the Cross Bronx expressway, fragmenting their community and infrastructure, and the subsequent devastation by extensive fires during the 1970s. She photographed residential streets that were reduced to rubble to the degree that they appeared like bomb sites. The photographs feature children playing outside and engaging with de Leon amongst the ruins. The series is intended as a historical document showing the consequences of U.S. austerity, and highlighting U.S. policy towards poor black and Latino communities.

The "South Bronx Spirit" Photo series has been featured in exhibitions at the El Museo del Barrio, Smithsonian American Art Museum, and the Los Angeles County Museum of Art. In 2018 she appeared on the radio broadcast Constructive Forces hosted by Kate Yoland on Resonance FM to discuss the history behind the project.

== Exhibitions ==
=== Down These Mean Streets: Community and Place in Urban Photography (2017) ===
De Leon was one of ten Latino photographers featured in the Smithsonian American Art Museum's Exhibition: Down These Mean Streets: Community and Place in Urban Photography. The exhibit focused on multiple cities that underwent drastic changes in terms of demographics and economy due to white flight and the construction of new highways that cut through once thriving neighborhoods. The ten artists documented the economic and social disintegration that especially occurred in working class African American and Latino communities. De Leon's photo series, "South Bronx Spirit" was featured. The exhibit was also on view at El Museo del Barrio from September 2018 to January 2019.

=== Home-So Different, So Appealing (2017) ===
The "South Bronx Spirit" photo series was featured in an exhibition that was organized by the Los Angeles County Museum of Art in collaboration with the Museum of Fine Arts, Houston. Home—So Different, So Appealing featured U.S. Latino and Latin American artists from the late 1950s to the present. According to LACMA's press release on the exhibit, "the artists deceptively use the simple idea of 'home' as a powerful lens through which to view the profound socioeconomic and political transformations in the hemisphere. De Leon was one of 39 artists who contributed a total of 100 works that the exhibit used to explore contrasts within art related to targeted immigration policies and political repression.

=== She Persists (2019) ===
De Leon was one of 44 female artists from New York City to be featured in the first ever woman's Art Exhibition to be on display at Gracie Mansion. The event was hosted by Mayor Bill de Blasio and curated by Art Historian Jessica Bell Brown. The exhibit aimed to reflect a fuller representation of New York's history by featuring women, who were largely underrepresented during the 220 years of Gracie Mansion's existence.

== Books ==
=== Decades Under Fire: The Invisible Puerto Rican-American (2019 - 2020) ===
Decades Under Fire: The Invisible Puerto Rican-American is an upcoming book by Perla de Leon that seeks to compare economic collapses, fires, and U.S. policies in the South Bronx, Vieques, and Puerto Rico.

== Other works ==
=== The Afro Descendant Project - Puerto Rico (2017) ===
In recognition of Puerto Rico completing 500 years since the beginning of colonial rule under Spain since 1517, de Leon started a new photo-series consisting of photo-portraits of the citizens of Puerto Rico with African American roots. The purpose was to document Puerto Rico's "most vulnerable and invisible citizens," whose ancestors were brought over by slave ships to build the foundation for Puerto Rico's economy.

=== Decade of Fire (2018) ===
De Leon's photo series, "South Bronx Spirit" was featured in the 2018 documentary Decade of Fire, directed by Vivian Vazquez and Gretchen Hildebran.
