= Corporation Island =

Island in the River Thames, England

Coordinates: 51°27′29″N 00°18′32″W

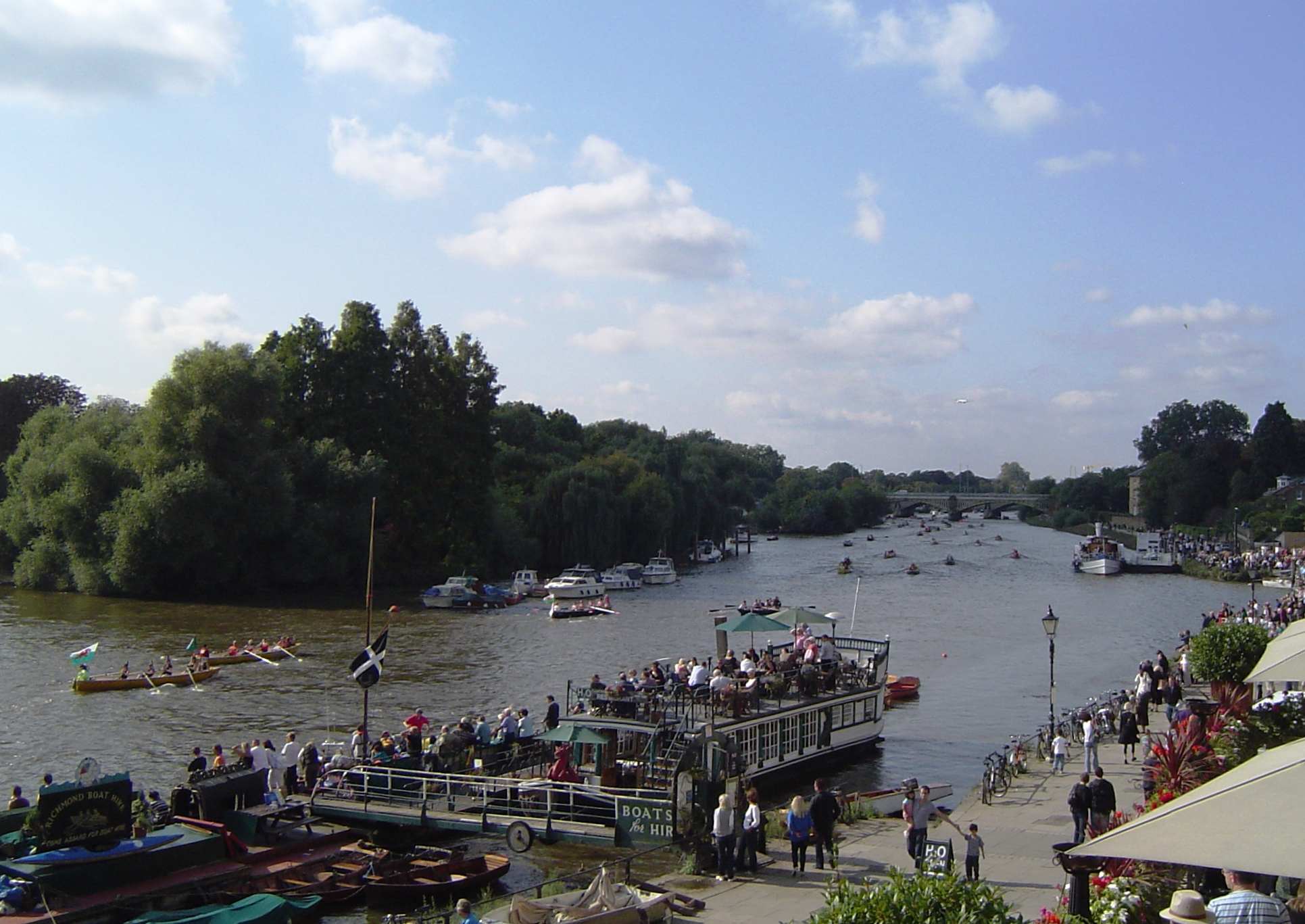
Corporation Island and the Flowerpots beyond, from Richmond Bridge

Corporation Island is a small island on the River Thames in London. The island is between Richmond Bridge and Richmond Railway Bridge, where it forms part of the celebrated view from the Richmond waterfront. Its name seems to derive from its owners, the Corporation of Richmond, now the London Borough of Richmond upon Thames. It is uninhabited and heavily wooded, and was formerly known as Richmond Ait.

The unpopulated Corporation Island is densely wooded with white willow, crack willow and weeping willow as well as hybrid black poplar. These were planted in the 1960s after Richmond Borough Council felled the London plane trees that had grown there. The island may have changed its shape due to alterations in the tidal flows in the Thames following the construction of the New London Bridge in 1829, followed by that of the Richmond half-tide lock.

Corporation Island is home to a heronry, a nesting colony of grey heron, which had 12 active nests in 2016. Just downstream from Corporation Island are the last islands on the Surrey stretch of the Thames, the Flowerpot Islands, which are two nearly circular islands covered in willows that were a single island until they were divided into two on the orders of the Duke of Queensbury in 1796. Subsequently, tidal erosion has reduced them to the two tiny islets, or eyots, currently visible.

One of the last photographs of The Beatles together was taken in 1969 of the band sitting on Corporation Island. There is now no public access to the island.

== See also ==
- Islands in the River Thames

Next island upstream	River Thames	Next island downstream
Glover's Island	Corporation Island	Isleworth Ait
