= Charito de León =

Filipino film actress

Charita de León (born 1939) is a Filipina actress who made movies under her mother studio Lvn Pictures, then later, Sampaguita Pictures. She started out as an extra, then became a principal dancer, with Bayani as choreographer. She landed her first pivotal role of Aurora in "El Robo" when she was only seventeen years old. She co-starred with Armando Goyena, Deliah Razon and Carlos Padilla, Jr. By the mid-1950s she was hailed as the Philippines' answer to Marilyn Monroe, proving that one could both be a serious actor and alluring at the same time!

Miss de León made numerous films, including: Basta Ikaw ("As Long As It's You") with Emma Alegre, Tingnan Natin ("Let's Look at It") with Nida Blanca and Nestor de Villa, Tuloy ang Ligaya ("Happiness Goes On") with Leroy Salvador and Nida Blanca. She garnered a Famas Award Best Actress nomination for her role as the abused woman gone mad in "Kidlat Sa Baril" in 1964.

She is the mother of Luis del Rosario, Jr. who recently won awards in the NY Film Festival 2006 for his film "NINA" The film garnered Best Love Story award in Los Angeles and Audience Choice Award in New York. Her other sons, Randino del Rosario and Ricardo del Rosario also help to continue the legacy of their beloved mother. She's perhaps best known for her television appearances in the mid-70's in shows such as "Alindog" with Alma Moreno; "Ito Ako, Pinky" with Pinky de Leon; and numerous mini-series and soap operas. She was best recognized under the name Rosario del Pilar, the screen name she acquired by the early sixties. Her internationally released film "Bulong Mo Sa Hangin", known here in the U.S. as "Blood of the Vampires" or "Curse of the Vampires" also starred Amalia Fuentes, Romeo Vasques, Eddie Garcia and Mary Walters, was made in 1970. It is available now on DVD, usually listed under horror/midnight movies. She made one film with her son, Randino in 1977, "At Lumaganap ang Lagim." It co-starred Rosemarie, Ricky Belmonte, Mary Walters and Gloria Romero.

== Filmography ==
- 1957 -El Robo
- 1957 -Basta Ikaw
- 1957 -Tingnan Natin
- 1958 -Tuloy ang Ligaya
