= Beatrice de Leon =

British theatre manager, school owner and impresario (1902–1991)

- Born: Beatrice Augusta Lewisohn; 12 August 1902; London Borough of Hackney, England
- Died: 16 February 1991 (aged 88); Kew, London, England
- Other names: Beatie
- Spouse: Jack de Leon (m. 1921; died 1956)
- Children: Jean de Leon

Beatrice Augusta de Leon born Beatrice Augusta Lewisohn (12 August 1902 – 16 February 1991) was a British theatre manager, dance school owner and impresario. She and Jack de Leon founded the Q Theatre, funded by Delia de Leon.

== Life ==
De Leon was born in the London Borough of Hackney in 1902. Her parents were Lydia Moses and Bernhard Lewisohn; the latter, who died in 1906, was a boot manufacturer. She was taken to the theatre and opera when growing up, and her mother would get her to recite. She learnt typing and shorthand before following her elder brother Victor into the acting profession, training at Herbert Beerbohm Tree's Academy of Dramatic Art. She later did some acting but discovered that she had stage fright.

In 1923, she and Delia de Leon founded the London Academy of Dramatic Art. Two years earlier, she had married Delia's brother, Jack de Leon, a solicitor with an interest in the arts.

In 1924, she and her husband took a lease of what had been the Prince's Hall Cinema in Kew. No longer a cinema, it had become a film studio for a while and had in the past been a pub and roller-skating rink. They decided to rename it the Q Theatre. On Boxing Day that year, the first production was Gertrude Jennings' successful comedy The Young Person in Pink; in which De Leon made her professional debut as an actor. Plays continued at the Q Theatre until 1929, when disagreements led to the De Leons stepping back. Her husband was having success as a playwright and was involved with other West End productions. His first play was performed at the Q Theatre, as were the first plays by Terence Rattigan and William Douglas-Home.

De Leon returned in 1931 to put on productions created by her drama school. She was now in charge, and the theatre returned to professional productions, with several transferring to the West End. Jack De Leon died in 1956, and the Q Theatre closed. De Leon and her daughter Jean ran a drama school (De Leon Drama School) at the Richmond Adult College for 30 years. After she retired, Beatie would use her money to back new productions in the West End. One of her successes was to invest in Oliver!

De Leon lived with her sister-in-law, Delia, in Kew. She died at her home in 1991. The building that contained the Q Theatre was demolished and replaced with a block of flats.
