= Juan Manuel de León Merchante =

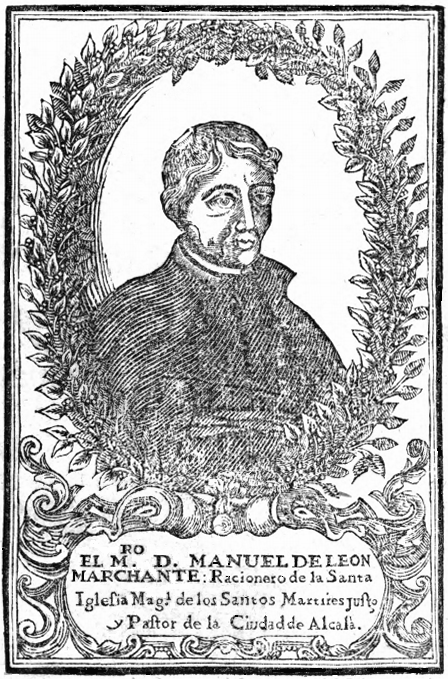
Manuel de León Marchante (1733 engraving)

Manuel de León Merchante (1631–1680) was a playwright of the Spanish Golden Age.

== Biography ==
Manuel de León Merchante was born in 1631 Pastrana, Spain. He died in 1680 in Alcalá de Henares.

== Gallery ==
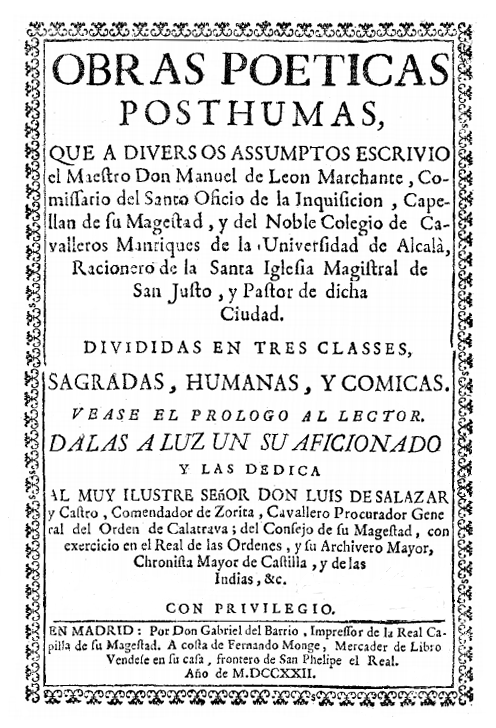
Obras poéticas póstumas (tomo I, 1722)

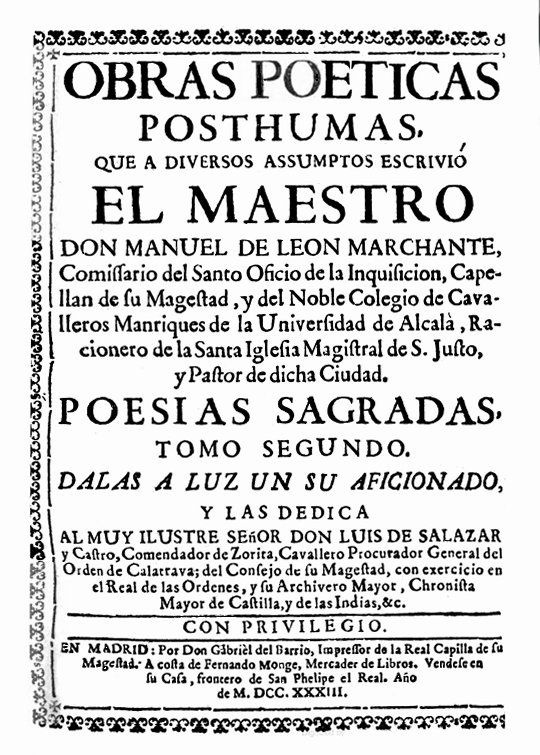
Obras poéticas póstumas (tomo II, 1733)
