= Q Theatre =

Former theatre and cinema in Chiswick, Hounslow, London, England

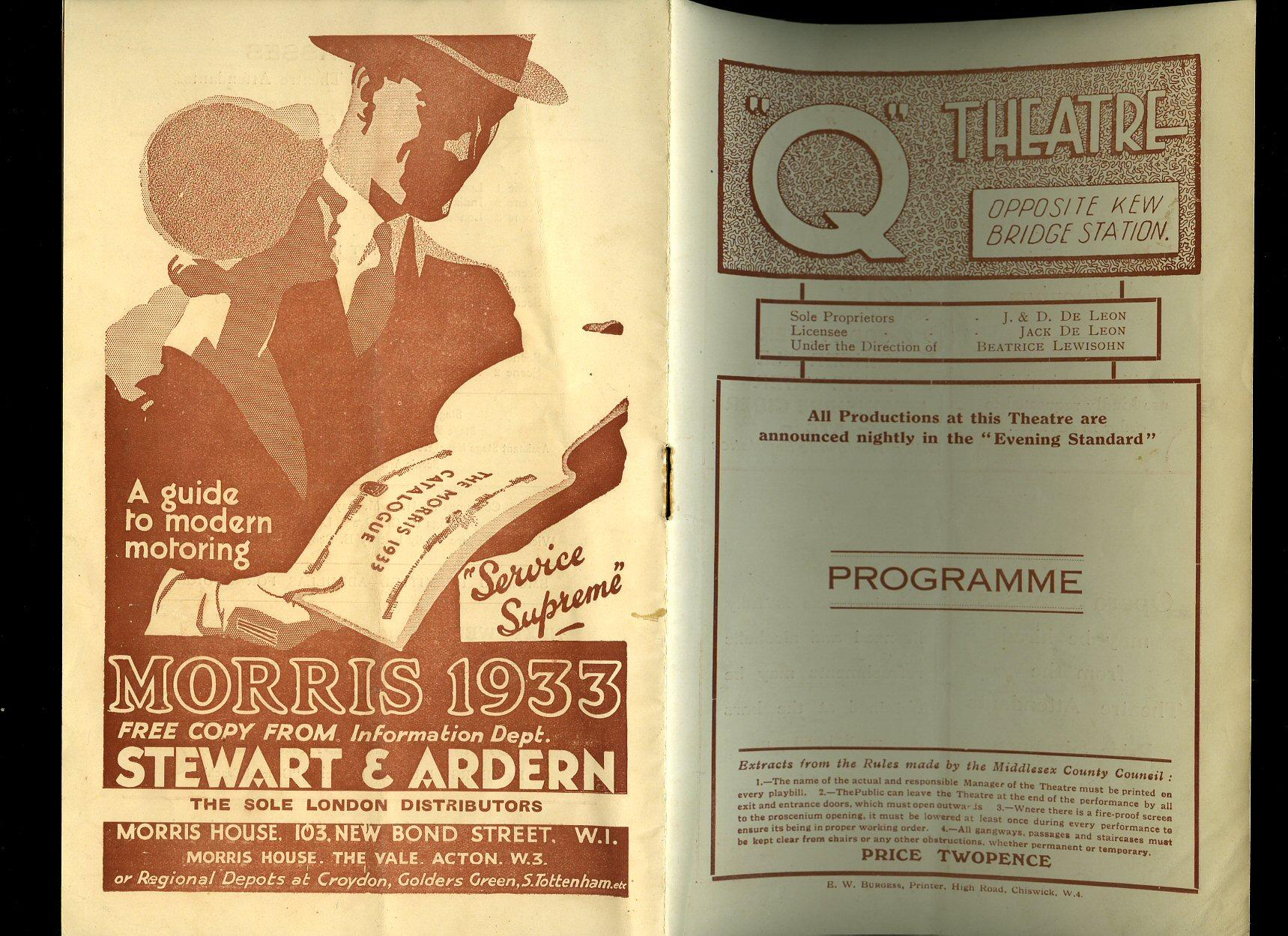
- A 1935 programme for "Crime on the Hill"
- Interactive map of Q Theatre
- Location: Brentford, London
- Coordinates: 51.4890°N 0.2865°W
- Capacity: 490

Construction
- Opened: 1924
- Closed: March 1958

The Q Theatre was a British theatre located near Kew Bridge in Brentford, west London, which operated between 1924 and 1958. It was built on the site of the former Kew Bridge Studios.

The theatre, seating 490 in 25 rows with a central aisle, was opened in 1924 by Jack and Beatie de Leon with the financial support of Jack's sister Delia. It was one of a number of small, committed, independent theatre companies which included the Hampstead Everyman, the Arts Theatre Club and the Gate Theatre Studio. These theatres took risks by producing new and experimental plays which, although often at first thought to be commercially unviable on the West End stage, later went on to transfer successfully.

Actors including Dirk Bogarde, Joan Collins, Vivien Leigh, Margaret Lockwood, Barry Morse, and Anthony Quayle started their theatrical careers here. Peter Brook, Tony Richardson, Charles Hawtrey and William Gaskell directed plays here and the theatre staged the first plays of Terence Rattigan and William Douglas-Home.

== Opening night ==
The new enterprise was originally advertised as "A Bright, Cosy Theatre for the presentation of successful WEST END PLAYS". The opening night was scheduled for September 1924, but the doors finally opened to the public on Boxing Day, 26 December 1924 with a production of Gertrude Jennings's The Young Person in Pink. But the occasion was marred by the over-selling of tickets, resulting in a number of disappointed and angry ticket-holders.

== Local press retrospective ==
In April 1992, the theatre critic of the Richmond and Twickenham Times series of local newspapers, wrote the following retrospective to welcome Kenneth Barrow's history of the theatre:

Jack de Leon was the man of action: a trained solicitor who became a talented playwright, director and charismatic impresario. His wife Beatie yearned to be an actress. But she settled for being one of the most shrewd and astute of theatre managers, a perfectionist and the legendary 'Lilian Baylis' of her time. 'No experience?' she would say to an aspiring actor. 'Well you know we can't afford to pay you anything, but you've got to start somewhere.'

Formerly a derelict roller-rink and film studio, their Q Theatre opened on Boxing Day 1924, modelled on the Everyman at Hampstead, and soon became a focus for new writing. Plays were tried out, went to the West End or were gently forgotten. Dozens of writing careers were launched, although Philip King's clerical farce, See How They Run is the only Q discovery to become a classic. The tiny theatre was a scene of triumph, riot, litigation and a disastrous fire.

It staged its last professional show in February 1956 and then turned to amateur use, finally closing its doors in March 1958 before demolition and replacement by a faceless office block. But in its last decade the upcoming talents included Jill Bennett, Joan Collins, Geraldine McEwan, Patricia Routledge, Denholm Elliott and Irene Worth, among the thousands offered the chance to exercise their art while finding their feet in the profession. And there is an absorbing coda carrying us on to the creation of the De Leon Drama School in Richmond upon Thames, eventually forming the nucleus of the now thriving Richmond Drama School, part of the borough's Adult Community College."
