= Heathrow timeline =

This is an event timeline and minor geographical information about Heathrow hamlet.

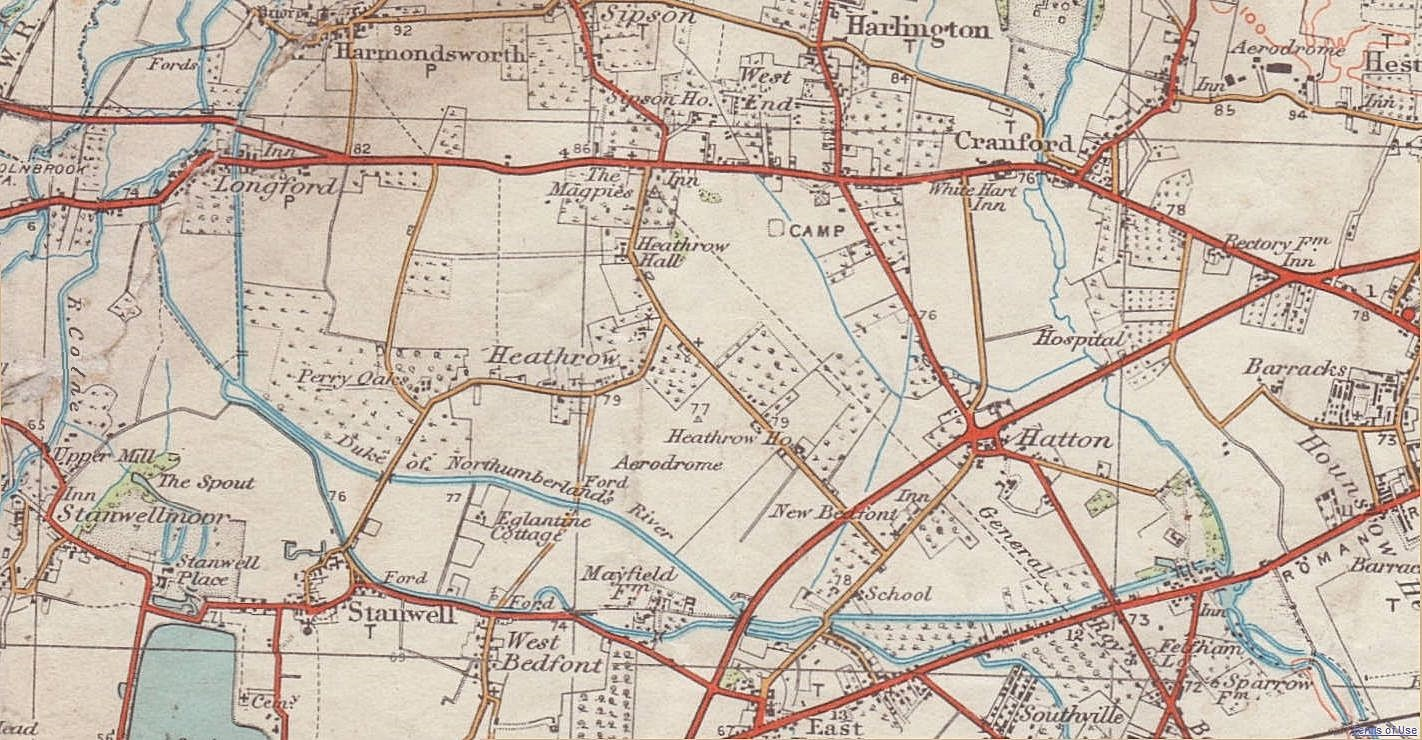
Map of Heathrow and around in the late 1930s

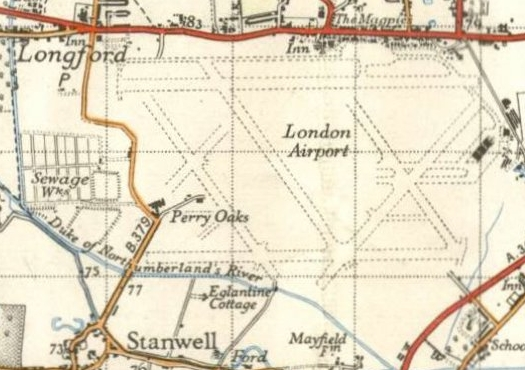
Map of Heathrow and around in 1948

== Founding and early history ==
A sizeable Neolithic settlement is believed to have been in the Heathrow area. Many artefacts have been found in the gravel around what is now the airport, and the Colne Valley. Waste pits filled with struck flint, arrowheads and fragments of pottery were also found in the area, indicating a settlement, though none other remains of such a settlement.

Until about 1930, there was only one building (part of Bath Road Farm) on the north side of Bath Road between The Magpies (an area around and opposite the north exit of the recent Heathrow Road), and Longford; other buildings were built afterwards there before World War II, including three factories (Technicolor and Penguin Books and Black+Decker). By 1944, there were no buildings on the south side of Bath Road between The Magpies and Longford.

Heathrow was away from main roads and further away from railways; that kept it secluded and quiet although near London. As Middlesex changed to market gardening and fruit growing to supply expanding London, parts of Heathrow held on to old-type mixed farming, and thus was chosen for Middlesex area horse-drawn ploughing competitions, which needed land which was under stubble after harvest.

The ford where High Tree Lane crossed the Duke of Northumberland's River was a scenic spot used sometimes for picnics and courting couples. There was a footpath along beside the river from the ford to Longford.

== Development ==
Agriculture became the main source of income for residents in the hamlet, as the brickearth soil in the area made farming ideal (it held manure well and did not go sticky when wet), so Heathrow became part of the west Middlesex market gardening industry. Many residents grew fruit, vegetables, and flowers, which they would travel with into London to sell, on the return journey collecting manure for farming. As the coming of motor vehicles made urban horse manure (from stables and cleaned off roads) much less, they started instead using sewage sludge (up to 50 tons per acre) from the Perry Oaks sewage works as fertiliser.

The Middlesex Agricultural and Growers' Association held annual ploughing matches in Heathrow, until the last, the 99th, was held on 28 September 1937; the 100th match (in 1938) was postponed to 1939 due to severe drought, and in 1939 it was cancelled because World War II had started.

The Royal Commission on Historic Monuments listed 28 historically significant buildings in the parish of Harmondsworth, a third of which were in Heathrow. Notable buildings included Heathrow Hall, a late 18th-century farmhouse, which was on Heathrow Road, and Perry Oaks farm, which was Elizabethan.

In the 19th century much brickearth-type land in west Middlesex, including in Heathrow, was used for orchards of fruit trees, often several sorts mixed in one orchard. Much soft fruit was grown, often in the orchards under the fruit trees. Sometimes vegetables, or flowers for cutting, were grown under the fruit trees. An author in 1907 reported "thousands and thousands" of plum, cherry, apple, pear, and damson trees, and innumerable currant and gooseberry bushes, round Harmondsworth and Sipson and Harlington and Heathrow. After World War I the amount of fruit growing in the area decreased due to competition from imports and demand for more market-gardening land, and by 1939 less than 10% of the orchard area was left.

Produce was taken to Covent Garden market, or by smaller growers to Brentford market, which was nearer but less profitable. From the Three Magpies lane junction near Heathrow to Covent Garden is 14 miles by road, which was about 6 hours at laden horse-and-wagon speed, so goods to market had to set off at 10 pm the day before to reach the market when it opened at 4 am, until motor trucks came. Lighter produce such as strawberries where freshness was important could reach Covent Garden Market in an hour and a half in a light vehicle behind a light fast horse.

An 11.93-acre field fronting on the south side of the Bath Road, about 600 yards east of Heathrow Road, was shown as allotment gardens on a map dated 1935, and it appears to be allotment gardens in the 1940 Luftwaffe air survey.

In the 1930s Heathrow Hall and Perry Oaks were mixed farms with wheat and cattle and sheep and pigs, and the other farms were largely market gardening and fruit growing. Photographs from early in the 20th century show milk cattle (about 22 in the photograph) at Cain's Farm and the yearly horse ploughing competition held along Cain's Lane, in the southeast of Heathrow; later photographs show ploughing competitions in the north near Tithe Barn Lane on land belonging to Heathrow Hall. Sipson Farm at the north end of Sipson may have owned land in Heathrow.

== Timeline ==
=== 13th century ===
- 1265: First mention of Southcote (later Southcoterow), a hamlet, or a name used for an area of farmland and houses (probably in the southwest of Harmondsworth parish). It occurs intermittently in mediaeval records until the 16th century, usually alternating with 'Heathrow'. At one time it included Perry (= Perry Oaks).

=== 14th century ===
- 1337: Perry Oaks is mentioned (called "Perry") in a rental.

=== 15th century ===
- about year 1410: Heathrow was first mentioned, as La Hetherewe.

=== 16th century ===
- Henry VIII of England's reign (1491–1547): The west part of the Duke of Northumberland's River was made past Heathrow.
- 1530: An old record lists an increase, probably temporary, of 42 labourers who were working on a new river cut from Longford, London (probably the Duke of Northumberland's River).
- 1583: Heathrow contained 14 houses.

=== 17th century ===
- 1648 or 1647: Inhabitants of Heathrow and around unauthorizedly blocked the Duke of Northumberland's River to stop flood damage that it was causing.
- 1653: Petitions were lodged to try to stop the Duke of Northumberland's River from being reopened.

=== 18th century ===
- 1784: General William Roy sought an area of land suitable for the base line of the Anglo-French Survey (1784–1790) trigonometrical survey. He chose the site because it was flat and near the Royal Observatory. The baseline for his measurements ran from King's Arbour (now within the confines of Heathrow Airport) to the Poor House in Hampton. See map. The ends were originally marked by vertical wooden pipes (which could support flagstaffs), but in the resurvey of 1791 they were found to be rotting and were replaced by cannons which are still to be seen.
- Late 18th century: Heathrow Hall farmhouse was built.

=== 19th century ===
- For much of the 19th century the Tillyer family lived in Heathrow Hall and the Weekley family in Perry Oaks.
- 18 March 1800: Start of lease of Richard Weekley at Perry Oaks.
- 1819: Enclosure of Harmondsworth parish. (Before that, most of the area bounded by Heathrow Road and the Bath Road and Tithe Barn Lane, and extending some way west from that, was one of the open fields of the parish and was called Heathrow Field, and the land southeast of Heathrow Road was common land locally called The Heath; those two area names stayed in local use long after.) Heathrow Field and the common land were divided into individual landholding fields. Cain's Lane was made straight across the common land: it was named after Isaac Cane, who was assigned land by the lane. High Tree Lane was made. Then or afterwards, a new row of farms was set up on this new farmland along both sides of Cain's Lane. Common land in the area of the later Wild's farm (Shrub End and Croft House) was assigned, some to Thomas Wild, Senior and some to William Wild, one area as freehold and other areas as copyhold. Much land in the north of the Heathrow area where the soil and brickearth above the gravel would be deepest, was assigned to "George Byng, Esq.", some as landowner, some in lieu of rights to tithe; all or much of this land later became property of Heathrow Hall. (At the time, the title "Esq." implied that he was a member of the upper gentry.) 71 acres was assigned to the Vicar of Harmondsworth in lieu of tithes. (It remained church property until on 31 Jan 1929 it was the first land in Heathrow that Fairey Aviation bought as a start to its Great West Aerodrome.)
- 14 February 1834: Cain's Farm farmhouse burnt down.
- 8 November 1845: During the Railway Mania a new railway was proposed, branching off an existing railway at Knightsbridge and running to Exeter, passing through or near Hounslow and Heathrow. This railway was not built; if it had been, a station at Heathrow might have started suburban spread there.
- 1847: John Byng, son of George Byng, was made John Byng, 1st Earl of Strafford. (In 1799 the previous Earl of Strafford died without male heir and his title became extinct.)
- 25 September 1872:Bankruptcy meeting in the case of Thomas Fowke, of Heathrow House, Heathrow, market gardener.
- 1877: Heathrow School was opened on the north side of the Bath Road, almost opposite The Old Magpies. (The current Earl Strafford donated the land that it was built on.)
- 1880: The Mission Church of St. Saviour was opened on the north side of the Bath Road, almost opposite The Three Magpies. It was built in corrugated iron.
- 1891: Rev. J. Williams Ashman (a curate to the vicar of Harmondsworth) is listed as living (probably as a lodger) in Heathrow Hall.
- 2 February 1874: A gale or a tornado demolished the Tithe Barn on Tithe Barn Lane.
- 29 October 1886: George Byng, 2nd Earl of Strafford died aged 80 and was succeeded by George Byng, 3rd Earl of Strafford
- 1894: Death duty was introduced in Britain.
- 1898: A notice advertising sale by auction of an area of land east of Cain's Lane says that "Earl Strafford" (George Byng, 3rd Earl of Strafford (1830–1898) or Henry Byng, 4th Earl of Strafford (1831–1899)) owned some adjacent land that in the 1819 map was marked as belonging to George Byng, Esq. That lot was "lot eight" in the auction; it is not stated whether any or all the other lots were land.
- 28 March 1898: George Byng, 3rd Earl of Strafford died childless aged 68 and was succeeded by his brother Henry Byng, 4th Earl of Strafford.
- 16 May 1899: Henry Byng, 4th Earl of Strafford died aged 67.
  - This double succession with less than 5 years' warning about death duties would probably have forced the Byng family to sell much land to pay the death duties.

=== 20th century ===
- Some time around 1900: Heathrow Hall was sold to Jonathan Smith, who then began to live there.
- 1901: A corrugated iron mission hall church ("tin tabernacle") was built on Cain's Lane, by the Baptist Church at Sipson.
- Early 1900s: Jonathan Smith sold Heathrow Hall to Josia Philp and moved into Wall Garden Farm in Sipson (on the north side of Sipson Lane, now due north of Heathrow Airport's main entrance). Jonathan Smith set up a jam factory (Smith's Jams) using fruit grown in the area, and later his son Frederick took over the factory; its site is now under part of Kenwood Close in Sipson.
- 16 November 1905: a petition of bankruptcy was filed against Jonathan Smith (market gardener) of Heathrow Hall, Harmondsworth, "lately residing at Sipson".
- 13 October 1908: A bankruptcy court decided to discharge Jonathan Smith's bankruptcy as from 13 October 1910, and reported that Jonathan Smith had earlier made an arrangement with his creditors, and that his assets were worth less than half of what he owed, and that he had not kept proper account books.
- 1911: Frederick and his wife Irene Philp, and Frederick's father Josiah Philp, lived at Heathrow Hall. (Irene was born in 1887 as Irene Martha Whetnall.)
- Week ending 8 September 1924: A power-farming demonstration organized by the Society of Motor Manufacturers and Traders was (planned to be) held on Heathrow Hall farm (owned then by Mr. J. E. Philp). The reference says that this event "[took] the place of the former tractor trials", but not whether those tractor trials were at Heathrow.
- 1925: Norman Macmillan, an RAF officer, made a forced landing and take-off at Heathrow. He noted the flatness of the land and its suitability for an airfield.
- 1926: Plaques were added to commemorate the 200th anniversary of General Roy's birth.
- 1929: Fairey Aviation bought the first of several plots of land west of Cain's Lane and there started the Great West Aerodrome. By then Norman Macmillan was Fairey Aviation's chief test pilot.
- 1930: The Church of St. Saviour (on the north side of the Bath Road) was demolished and replaced by a brick building further from the road. (It was demolished in the 1960s and the Excelsior Hotel was built on its site.) The Road Research Laboratory was opened on the Colnbrook by-pass.
- 12 June 1931: Middlesex County Council bought land for £33,000 from W.Whittington & Son, the owners of Perry Oaks farm; it was orchard then; they later built the Perry Oaks sewage sludge works there.
- Early 1930s: Middlesex County Council set up 24 smallholdings (Burrows Hill Close Estate and Bedfont Court Estate) west of Perry Oaks sewage works, each with a small house.
- 1933: A local trade directory lists for Heathrow these: Mrs. Waddell (Cain's Farm house); farmers or market gardeners: Harry Curtis (Heathrow Farm), George Dance (a small house on Heathrow Road nearly opposite the Plough and Harrow pub), William Howell (Bathurst), Frederick Philp (Heathrow Hall), Sidney Whittington (Perry Oaks), David and John Wild (Croft House); other: Heathrow Sand & Gravel Co (Colnbrook) Ltd., Edgar Charles Basham (the trade directory misprinted his surname as Sasham) (publican at the Plough and Harrow pub), Fairey Aviation.
- 1934: D.J. Wild married Naomi from Shrub End (a big farm a bit southwest of Colchester, now built over); Shrub End farmhouse in Heathrow may have been named after it.
- 1934: The Perry Oaks sewage works was built; thereby Perry Oaks farm lost a large area of orchard.
- 1935: Middlesex County Council built four houses (1,2,3,4 Perry Oaks) for the sewage works staff. They later became property of the Ministry of Defence and stayed there (between the airport and the sewage works) when Heathrow Airport at its present size was built in 1944 and after.
- 5 May 1935: First Royal Aeronautical Society airshow at the Great West Aerodrome. An aerial photograph taken then shows twenty four display aircraft parked, and in front of them what may be about fifteen more, smaller, southwest of the big hangar, and about two hundred cars parked northwest of Gamble's Farm on the northeast edge. Over 2,000 people visited, some in private aeroplanes; these were parked along the south boundary, out of shot on the photograph. Perfect weather.
  - More people visited in these airshows than visited Heathrow in the rest of the year.
- 1936: Technicolor Ltd opened a factory on the north side of the Bath Road opposite Heathrow's land.
- 23 October 1936: Kingsley Wood formally opened the Perry Oaks sewage sludge works and the main sewage works at Mogden, but they had been in use for a period before that.
- 1938: Penguin Books opened a factory on the north side of the Bath Road opposite Heathrow's land.
- 14 May 1939: Fifth and last Royal Aeronautical Society airshow at the Great West Aerodrome. Twenty aircraft displayed; plus also (during the first tea interval) nine Spitfires and then nine Bristol Blenheims.
- 1 September 1939: World War II started. The Heathrow Brick Co., Ltd. applied to HM Land Registry to register land on Heathrow Road. Flower growers changed to growing vegetables.
- 1940: Black & Decker opened a factory on the north side of the Bath Road at the junction with Hatch Lane. (It closed in the 1970s and it has gone.)
- 1940: Battle of Britain: fighter planes sometimes landed on the Great West Aerodrome for the night and their pilots sometimes got a bed for the night in Heathrow village.
- 4 February 1941: D. J. Wild (living at Shrub End) and J. E. Wild (living at Croft House) applied to HM Land Registry to register land at Shrub End and Croft House on Cain's Lane in Heathrow.
- 4 November 1941: First mention of the bankruptcy case of 4 brothers surnamed Portsmouth (builders), 2 living in Harlington and 2 in Heathrow. It ran on until at least 18 September 1942.
- 1 July 1943: A meeting of the creditors of the Heathrow Brick Company was scheduled to be held on 9 July 1943.
- 1944: The Caesar's Camp early Iron Age village on the airport site was excavated. There was a Bronze Age field system and some Neolithic remains.
- 1944: Heathrow hamlet was obliterated by the modern airport construction work. The cannon in Heathrow was removed, as it would have stood close to one of the main runways, though it was later returned to the original spot with the plaque placed separately. One information list says that stage one of building the airport destroyed, or was planned to destroy, sixteen farmhouses, twenty three dwelling houses, and thirty five cottages, but some of these may have been in the north part of Hatton, and that list may not include Perry Oaks. Another information source says 2,650 acres and 215 homes, but that may be the original full plan including demolishing Sipson and most of Harlington.
  - The Perry Oaks sewage works protected Burrows Hill Close Estate and Bedfont Court Estate for 57 more years.
  - Responsibility for the evictees was passed between the Air Ministry and the Ministry of Health. Most of them were moved to Air Ministry property near RAF Heston. The Wilds of Shrub End and Croft House found new farmland near Colchester (near where David Wild's wife had come from), and evacuated their greenhouses and packing shed and front gate and front hedge there. Some of the Heathrow farmers and market gardeners found land in Kent to grow crops on.
- June 1946: An air photo of the airport shows only the first triangle of runways, and Cain's Farm still standing (but not necessarily still occupied) just outside the airport's perimeter road.
- 25 January 1949: The Minister of Civil Aviation applied to H.M. Land Registry to register freehold ownership of land at Perry Oaks Farm.
- 1949 or before: Houses along Hatton Road were demolished.
- 1951: The Old Magpies pub (100 yards west of The Three Magpies) was demolished.
- 1995: A road sign in a photograph shows that there was an Equestrian Centre for the Handicapped in the Burrows Hill Close Estate.
- 2001: Burrows Hill Close Estate (east of Stanwell Moor Road) was obliterated by building Terminal 5, and Bedfont Court Estate (west of Stanwell Moor Road) was dug up to extract gravel (see Google Earth image).

== Notable buildings ==
See File:Heathrow Before World War II Map.jpg#Road names for the names of the roads.

=== Heathrow Road ===
Starting at the north end:

- Doghurst Cottages, east side, north end, built around 1900, demolished in the early 1950s. Old photographs show them as brick-built 2-storey houses with slate or tile roofs.
- Bathurst market garden, east side. Opposite it:
- W & S Philp's market garden, west side, grew flowers until World War II started.
- 2 modern houses, west side: in the 1930s Mr. Ward (headmaster at Harmondsworth school) lived there.
- A thatched house, west side, the two Biddescombe families lived there in the 1930s.
- A big sand and gravel quarry / brick works, east side
- Heathrow Hall: west side, large farm, built late 18th century. Farm buildings area about 300 feet (E-W) by 350 feet (N-S). Square of large Dutch barns (in the British sense) round a yard with another large barn in the middle; other buildings to north and west; farmhouse at north end, facing a bit south of eastwards, about 40 feet N-S by about 50 feet E-W, had two pitched roofs E-W with a valley between, two bay windows at front. A big Lebanon Cedar in its front lawn. Farmyard gate about 130 feet south of farmhouse gate, both onto Heathrow Road, which had a sharp bend (35° eastwards) at the house gate.
- Palmer's Farm: west side, built early 17th century. (Opposite it was an entrance of the brick works.) Two (blocks of) buildings in L-shape, about 140 feet square. One gate on road.
- Junction with Cain's Lane (named Wheatcut Corner) (and another entrance of the brick works)
- A square area of land north of the airfield. Formerly belonged to Perrott's Farm. Then passed to the Tillyers, then to W & S Philp of Harlington; was orchard. In 1938 during the Munich Crisis the Wilds got this land and grubbed out the orchard and planted vegetables on the land.
- Perrott's Farm: north side, half-timbered frontage; in 1819 owned by one Martha Parrott. Farm buildings area about 280 feet N-S, 210 feet E-W. Set about 150 feet back from road. Two drives to road. In its last years Heathrow Farm used its buildings.
- Plough and Harrow pub, north side, in the 1930s run by Mr. Basham (an ex-policeman)
- A small market garden house nearly opposite the Plough and Harrow, south side: John Dance lived there.
- A market garden house, north side, George Dance and Sons lived there.
- Heathrow Farm: north side, built in 16th century half-timbered, brick faced in 18th century. It grew vegetables and cereals.
- Site of Lowe's Farm, which on 16 June 1930 became part of the Great West Aerodrome, south side
- Junction with High Tree Lane
- High Tree Farm: south side
- About 4 groups of buildings, spaced out on the north side, including a timber-framed thatched Tudor house split into 2 residences; In later years these included the village shop, run by Mr. Field. A block of 8 small buildings on the south side. This reference includes a 1930s map of Heathrow (as its covers) and a 1915 map of Heathrow (as its centerfold), both about 6 inches / 1 mile, and the 1915 map shows much fewer buildings in this area.
  - Image of timber-framed thatched cottage in Heathrow
- Perry Oaks (Elizabethan): north side. It is mentioned (called 'Perry') in a rental dated 1337. Farm buildings area oval, about 460 feet SW-NE by 240 feet SE-NW. It had a gate onto Heathrow Road and a gate onto Tithe Barn Lane.

=== Cain's Lane ===
Starting at the north end:

- Wild's farm: founded in 1928 when the Wild family moved there from Longford, London. It grew flowers and flower bedding plants until World War II started in 1939, then vegetables; at the changeover many tulip bulbs were fed to pigs. It had a line of greenhouses and packing shed etc. about 500 feet long SW-NE behind Croft House. Philip Sherwood worked there in his 1941 and 1942 summer school holidays. It had 2 farmhouses:
  - Shrub End: east side
  - Croft House: east side
- Gamble's Farm: west side (buildings still shown on 1934 map, but from 4 Mar 1929 part of Fairey Aviation's Great West Aerodrome)
- A small "tin tabernacle" church or chapel made of corrugated iron: east side, built in 1901
- East side, behind the chapel: Land farmed by Mr. Longhurst
  - South of the airfield:-
- Cain's Farm: west side. In 1819 land around there was assigned to Isaac Cane as freehold. In the early 1900s Charles Glenie lived there and he had a dairy herd of at least 20 cows. In the early 1930s Mrs. Waddell lived there. Farm buildings area about 150 feet SW-NE by 210 feet SW-NW, plus an area of small walled enclosures.
- Heathrow House: east side: built in the 18th century. In 1839 it was owned by Richard Langslow, who lived here until the 1850s. His daughter married Sir Frederick Pollock, 3rd Baronet, who lived in Temple Hatton, a house in Hatton, London. In 1872 a market gardener lived there, and thus likely then the house was being used as a farmhouse.

=== Tithe Barn Lane ===
- Tithe barn or its site: west side, and Tithe Barn Farm.
