= Heathrow (hamlet) =

Former hamlet in Harmondsworth, Middlesex, England, site of Heathrow Airport

Coordinates: 51.4673°N 0.4529°W

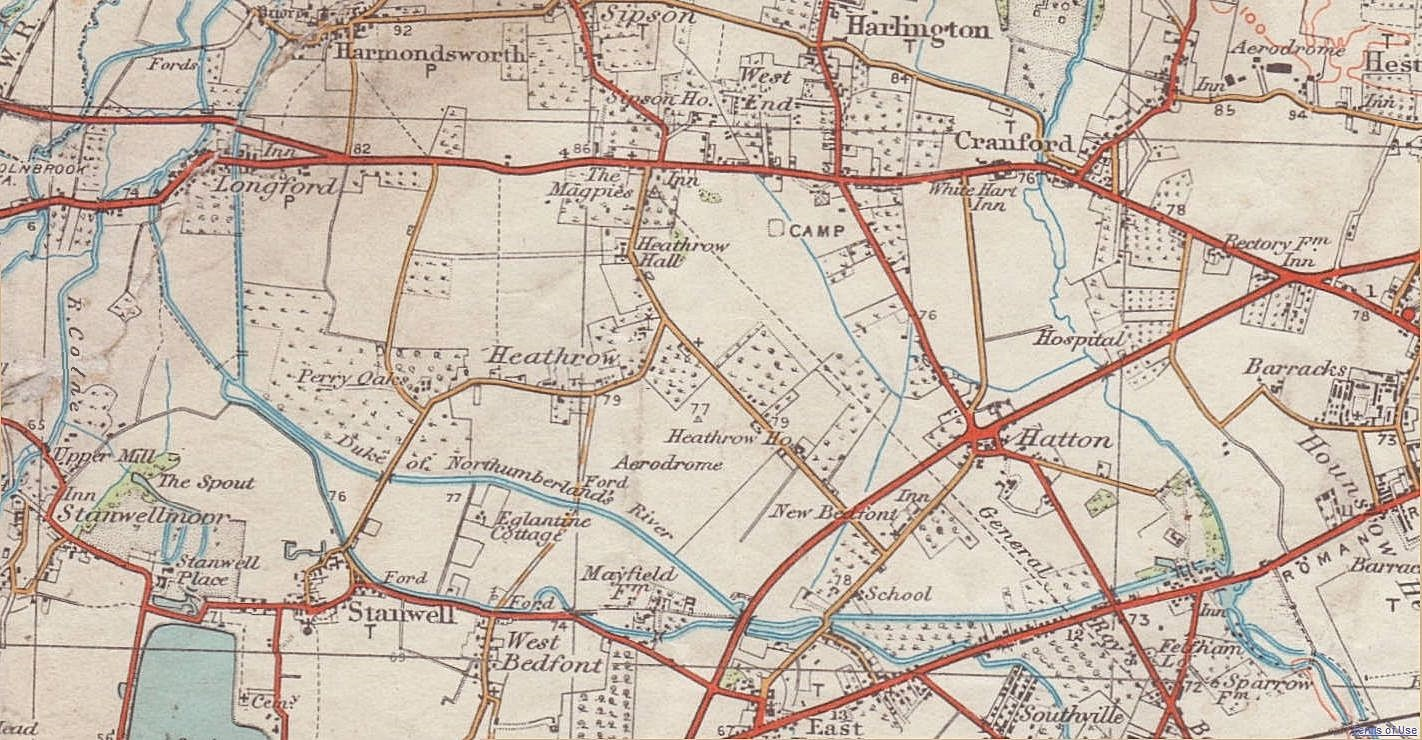
- Map of the land which would become Heathrow Airport and nearby in the late 1930s

- Location within Greater London
- OS grid reference: TQ074754
- London borough: Hillingdon
- Ceremonial county: Greater London
- Region: London
- Country: England
- Sovereign state: United Kingdom
- Post town: HOUNSLOW
- Postcode district: TW6
- Dialling code: 020
- Police: Metropolitan
- Fire: London
- Ambulance: London
- UK Parliament: Hayes and Harlington
- London Assembly: Ealing and Hillingdon

Heathrow or Heath Row was a wayside hamlet along a minor country lane called Heathrow Road in the ancient parish of Harmondsworth, Middlesex, England, on the outskirts of what is now Greater London. Its buildings and all associated holdings were demolished, along with almost all of the often grouped locality of The Magpies in 1944 for the construction of the new London Airport, which would later assume the name of Heathrow after 1967.

The name Heathrow described its layout: a lane, on one side smallholdings and farms of fields and orchards which ran for a little over one mile (1.6 km), on the other, until the 1819 Inclosure for farmland, common land: a mixture of pasture, hunting and foraging land on less fertile heath. Akin to Sipson Green it was a scattered agricultural locality of Harmondsworth. The two lightly populated places dotted the brickearth-over-gravel soils in the east of Harmondsworth which historically butted on to Hounslow Heath. Yards from the lane, while the heath existed, General William Roy mapped one end of the first baseline for measuring the distance between the Paris and Greenwich observatories, the first precise distance survey in Britain, in 1784.

By the late 19th century Heathrow had developed three main agricultural settlement clusters with orchards and fields worked by teams of labourers – Heathrow Hall, Perrotts Farm and on some measures Perry Oaks at a fork in the southwest end of the lane. Abutting The Magpies, east along the Bath Road, Sipson Green also lay in Harmondsworth, covered in the article on the hamlet-turned-village of Sipson. A small orchard founded before the 19th century Kings Arbour, Harmondsworth, separated The Magpies from Heathrow. The Magpies had a mission church of the parish and has kept one of its pre-1765 public houses, The Three Magpies.

== History ==
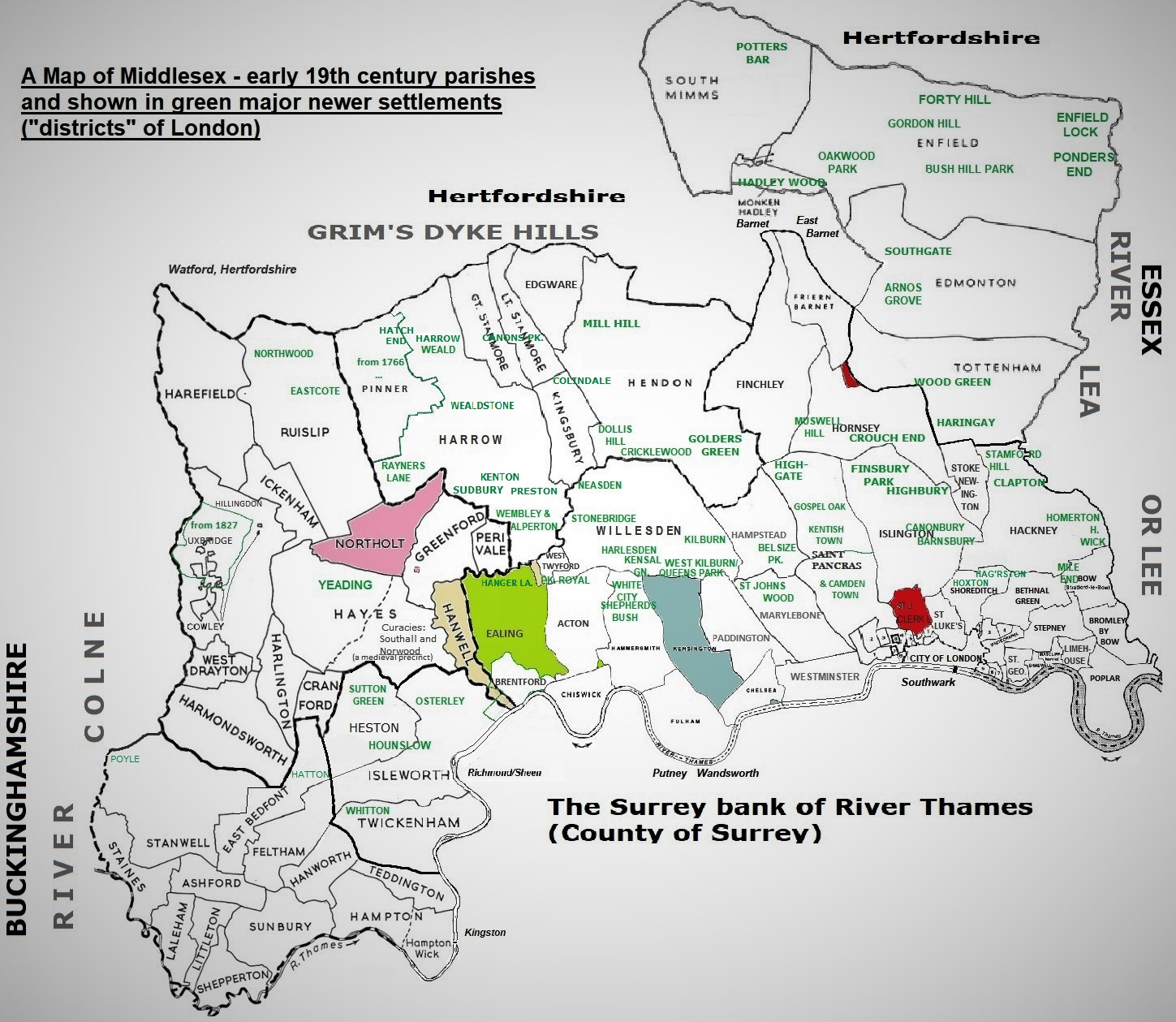
The extent of Harmondsworth which as a parish from at least the Norman Conquest until the mid-20th century included Sipson, Longford and Heathrow.

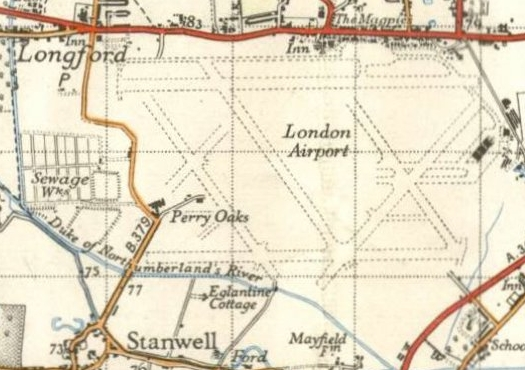
Map of Heathrow and around in 1948

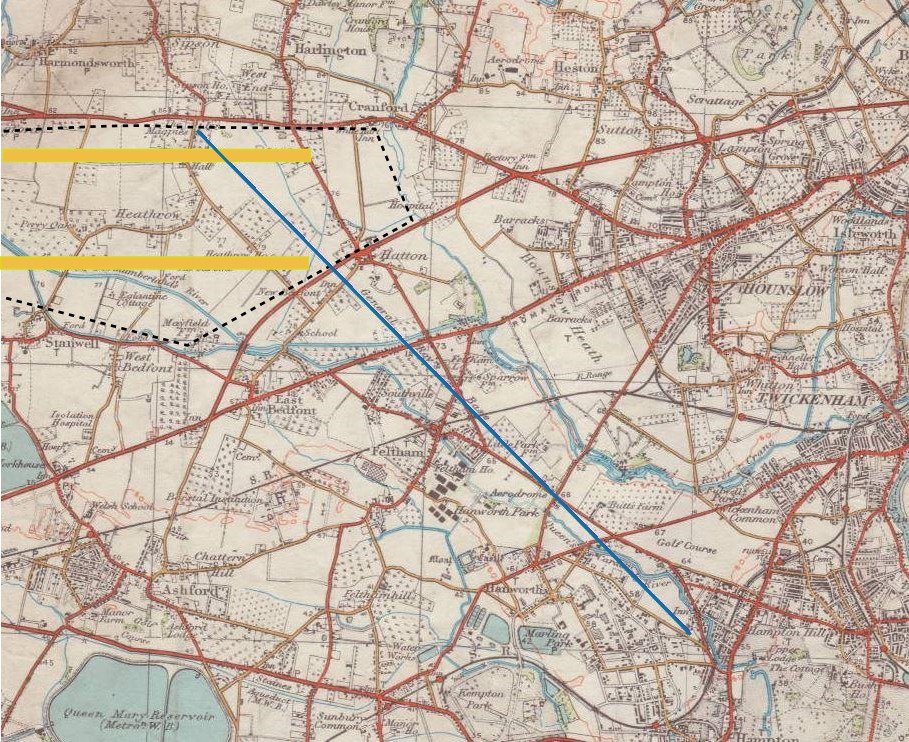
The Hounslow Heath baseline and Heathrow Airport's perimeter and 2 main runways superimposed on an Ordnance Survey map of 1935

For a timeline of Heathrow events, see Heathrow timeline.

=== Extent and development ===
By the 1910s the amenities of Heathrow had grown little since the, at latest, 15th-century laying out of the lane.

It spanned, north–south, from Kings Arbour orchard to Perry Oaks farm (which sat at the junction of the lane and another). An agricultural cluster of buildings and great house Heathrow Hall were slightly toward the north of the lane. All the homes and farms clung to this 90° turning lane, a turn staggered by two bends. Detailed 1910s maps show its unusual continuing agricultural focus so close to London; about half of the buildings and homes were at the two farms. The northern was Heathrow Hall, 500 metres south of the area of Harmondsworth that was from the 16th century until the mid 20th century known as The Magpies, (Note: The Magpies was a neighbourhood with its own Mission Church in Harmondsworth parish around the narrowed and closed-off lane once Heathrow Road, next to The Old Magpies (of the 16th century to 1950s) and the circa 18th century Three Magpies pub, both west of today's north exit of the Northern Perimeter Road) a mix of terraces and houses on and off of the Bath Road, the west of which was a set of 18 densely packed houses, Belch's Row and the east of which was Sipson Green, further orchard-backed homes along the Bath Road in the same parish. Heathrow itself had no terraces, instead small cottages and a few larger houses in large grounds. Two offshoot lanes broke away, Cain's Lane southeast to New Bedfont and High Tree Lane south to West Bedfont (long part of Stanwell); at the start of Cain's Lane was in the 1910s an Anglican Mission room in the heart of the orchards and fields of Perrotts Farm, the other main cluster of buildings of Heathrow. The Diocese of London was keen to give all people a convenient place of worship. By the end of the 19th century The Magpies had a mission church, on the north side of the Bath Road. Sipson Green is covered in the text on the hamlet-turned-village of Sipson. Both remain intrinsic parts of the ecclesiastical parish of Harmondsworth, whose parish priest is as at 2025 Ven. Amatu Onundu Christian-Iwuagwu in a church with elements surviving from initial 1067 construction. It will be re-sited or see elements curated in a museum if a third runway for Heathrow Airport receives final planning permission and all appeals are dismissed.

=== Founding and early history ===
A sizeable Neolithic settlement is believed to have been in the Heathrow area. Many artefacts have been found in the gravel around what is now the airport, and the Colne Valley regional park. Waste pits filled with struck flint, arrowheads and fragments of pottery were also found in the area, indicating a settlement, though none other remains of such a settlement.

Heathrow was one of the last settlements formed in the parish of Harmondsworth. Its name was rendered in various orthographies which reflect approximately the same pronunciation as today La Hetherewe (about year 1410, first known mention), Hithero, Hetherow, Hetherowfeyld, Hitherowe, and Heath Row/Heathrow, Middle English spellings of "heath row" (simply a row (impliedly of houses) on or by a heath). Old maps show Heathrow as a row of houses along the northwest sides of the curve of a lane occasionally named Heathrow Road or Lane, which faced land until 1819 part of a great set of common lands belonging to neighbouring parishes — Hounslow Heath. The first orthography as "Heathrow" dates to 1453.

==== Sipson Green earthworks ====
Certain Ordnance Survey maps before the Second World War, closer to Sipson Green and the adjoining Harlington Corner (localities of the Bath Road), show an earthwork, 300 metres due south of where New Road, Harlington meets the Bath Road, that had been excavated in 1723 by order of William Stukeley. He believed it to have been a Roman settlement, and named it "Caesar's Camp".

=== General Roy's western baseline ===
In 1784 General William Roy chose the orchard of King's Arbour to be one end of first base line of the Anglo-French Survey (1784–1790) trigonometrical survey for the first triangles of a triangulation grid reaching across the English Channel. He chose Hounslow Heath for his lines as it was near-flat, near barracks and about 15 miles from the Royal Observatory. The east/south end was the Poor House in Hampton. The ends were originally marked by vertical wooden pipes (which could support flagstaffs), but in the resurvey of 1791 they were found to be rotting and were replaced by upright cannon heads which are still to be seen.

The marker and landmarks on the Bath Road enables visitors and historians to picture features on old maps when visiting today's airport, without the use of grid references.

=== Great West Aerodrome ===
In 1929, Fairey Aviation bought 71 acres (29 ha) of land just southeast of Heathrow hamlet, to establish an airfield for flight testing; later purchases gradually enlarged the aerodrome to about 240 acres (97 ha). It came to be called the Great West Aerodrome, which in 1944 was greatly enlarged to become London Airport, which was later renamed as Heathrow Airport.

=== Development ===
Agriculture became the main source of income for residents in the hamlet, as the brickearth just as the underlying gravel in soils in the area made for reliable farming for fruit trees and bushes, vegetables, and flowers as it held manure well and markets were in easy reach of these perishable cash crops. Clay soil in other parts of England favoured potatoes and chalk favoured grains. Most residents and seasonal labourers joined in the large west Middlesex market gardening industry. Many residents grew which they would travel with into London to sell, on the return journey collecting manure for farming. As motor vehicles made urban horse manure (from stables and cleaned off roads) much less, local farm workers started instead using sewage sludge (up to 50 long tons per acre (130 t/ha) annually) from the Perry Oaks sewage works, opened in 1936, as fertiliser.

The farms and buildings across most of south-east Harmondsworth greatly changed in the early 20th century; mostly a web of rural roads and lanes. An illustration being that until about 1930, only one building stood on the north side of Bath Road between Belches Row at The Magpies on the two kilometres to the demolished Kings Head west of the preserved Longford Pump, Longford. (Note: The remote building was a small building and outbuilding, together part of Bath Road Farm; today by the modernist, tinted-glass office building Heathrow Boulevard where its large brick sign holder exists today) Three factories: Technicolor and Penguin Books and Black & Decker were founded in those fields before 1939. No buildings equally stood on the south side of this major thoroughfare. (Note: Except Fairview Farm, Longford today the site of a large airport car park)

Other than a few homes and gardens, six farms held land which became the airport in the 1930s, as documented in principal feature maps.

Heathrow was away from main roads and further away from railways; that kept it secluded and quiet although near London. As Middlesex changed to market gardening and fruit growing to supply expanding London, parts of Heathrow held on to old-type mixed farming, and thus was chosen for Middlesex area horse-drawn ploughing competitions, which needed land which was under stubble after harvest.

The ford where High Tree Lane crossed the Duke of Northumberland's River was a scenic spot used sometimes for picnics and courting couples. There was a footpath along beside the river from the ford to Longford.

The Middlesex Agricultural and Growers' Association held annual ploughing matches in Heathrow, until the last, the 99th, was held on 28 September 1937; the 100th match (in 1938) was postponed to 1939 due to severe drought, and in 1939 it was cancelled because World War II had started.

The Royal Commission on Historic Monuments listed 28 historically significant buildings in the parish of Harmondsworth, a third of which were in Heathrow. Notable buildings included Heathrow Hall, a late 18th-century farmhouse, which was on Heathrow Road, and Perry Oaks farm, which was Elizabethan.

In the 19th century much brickearth-type land in west Middlesex, including in Heathrow, was used for orchards of fruit trees, often several sorts mixed in one orchard. Much soft fruit was grown, often in the orchards under the fruit trees. Sometimes vegetables, or flowers for cutting, were grown under the fruit trees. An author in 1907 reported "thousands and thousands" of plum, cherry, apple, pear, and damson trees, and innumerable currant and gooseberry bushes, round Harmondsworth and Sipson and Harlington and Heathrow. After World War I the amount of fruit growing in the area decreased due to competition from imports and demand for more market-gardening land, and by 1939 less than 10% of the orchard area was left.

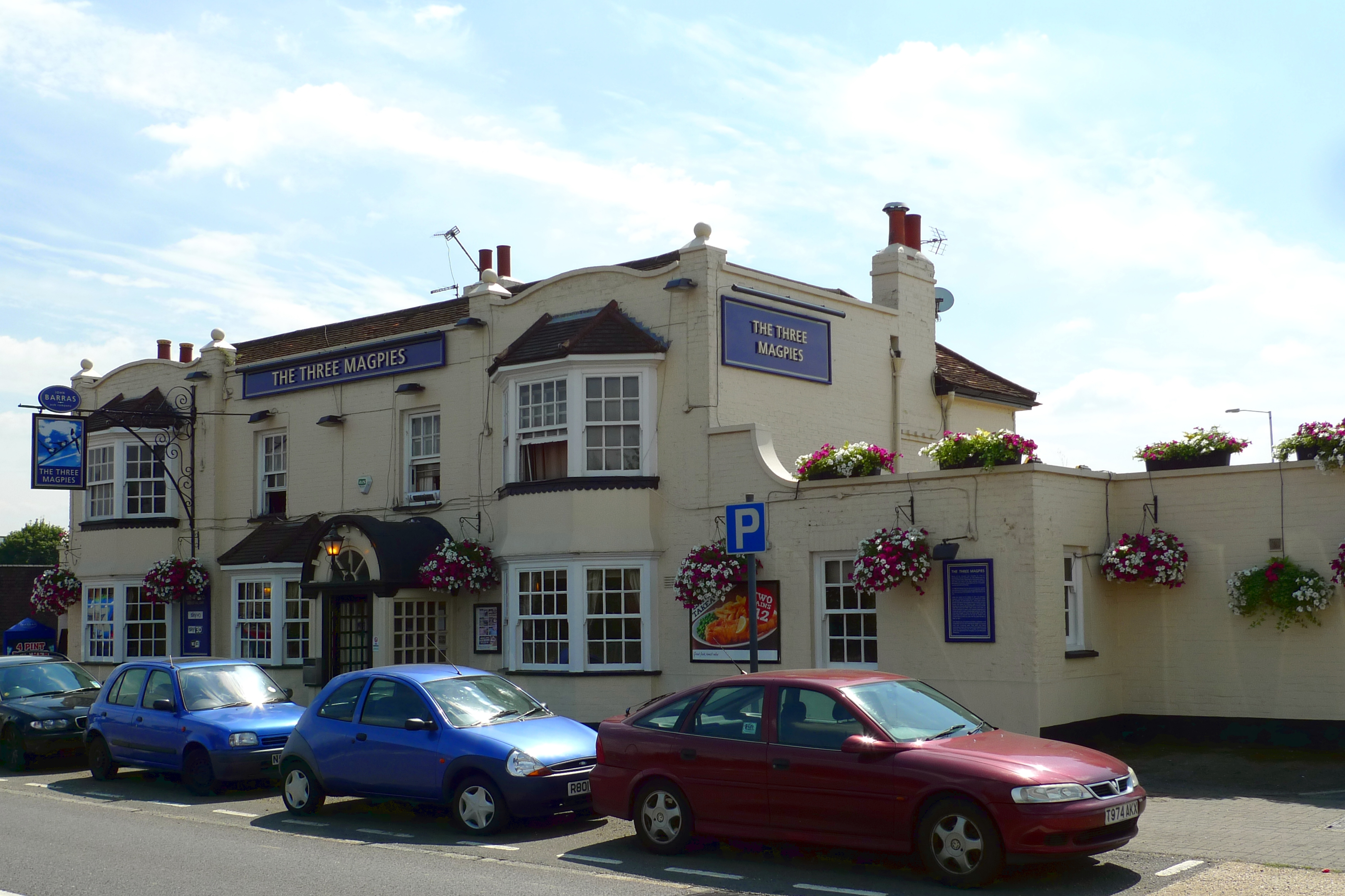
The Three Magpies pub on Bath Road is the only surviving building of the former locality known as The Magpies.

Produce was taken to Covent Garden market, or by smaller growers to Brentford market, which was nearer but less profitable. From the Three Magpies, the lane's northern end – much reduced and curtailed today – to Covent Garden is 14 miles (23 km) which was about 6 hours at laden horse-and-wagon speed; goods had to set off before 10 pm the day before to reach the market when it opened at 4 am, until motor trucks came. Lighter produce such as strawberries where freshness brought highest prices could reach Covent Garden Market in an hour and a half in a light vehicle behind a light fast horse.

An 11.93-acre (4.83 ha) field south of the Bath Road, about 600 yards (550 m) east of the lane, was, between 1912 and 1935, allotment gardens (shown on a map dated 1935) and in the 1940 Luftwaffe air survey.

In the 1930s Heathrow Hall and Perry Oaks were mixed farms with wheat, cattle, sheep and pigs, and the other farms were largely market gardening and fruit growing. Photographs from early in the 20th century show to the southeast, at Cain's Farm facing modest Heathrow House, milk cattle (about 22 in the photograph) and the yearly horse-drawn ploughing competition on Cain's Lane. Later examples show such competitions in the far north-east near Tithe Barn Lane on Heathrow Hall land. In the 1910s a small gravel pit of just under an acre was on the east side of Tithe Barn Lane at the far west of what could be loosely, based mainly on Heathrow Hall's ownership be considered part of Heathrow and a similar marsh then pond to the north, all where today's Compass Centre stands.

== Archaeology ==
=== Caesar's Camp ===
Caesar's Camp, also called Schapsbury Hill and Shasbury Hill, was a square, Early Iron Age, British (not Roman) fort site of c. 500 BC, south of Bath Road, about halfway between Heathrow Road and Hatton Road, and a bit north of due east of Heathrow Hall. It was about 300 feet (90 m) square (c. 1820 measurement) or 380 feet (120 m) square (1911 measurement). It survived because it was on common land until the enclosure of the commons of Harmondsworth parish, after which the fort's ramparts were fairly quickly ploughed out.

It was excavated hurriedly in 1944: see timeline below. Inside its rampart 15 circular hut sites were found, and a large rectangular building which was probably a temple. The east end of the north runway obliterated it.

=== Fern Hill ===
Fern Hill was another ramparted prehistoric site, represented in 1944 by a roughly circular cropmark about 250 feet (80 m) in diameter, near Hatton Cross. The site is now partly under an aircraft hangar.

=== Terminal 5 site ===
Construction of Heathrow Terminal 5 began in September 2002, on the site of the Perry Oaks sewage works, with earthworks for the construction of the buildings' foundation. The long delay caused by planning discussions allowed a thorough archaeological dig at the site, which found more than 80,000 artefacts.

== Industry ==
A brickearth and gravel quarry and brick works was opened in the 1930s. At a survey in 1934 the quarry was 15.9 acres (6.4 ha), of which 5.3 acres (2.1 ha) was lake. Later it expanded to the northeast and finally the lake was about one-quarter mile (0.40 km) long. The Heathrow Brick Company went into liquidation in 1943 and was wound up in 1944.

A sewage sludge works was built in the Perry Oaks part of Heathrow in 1934, and a 2-foot (610 mm) gauge railway installed three years later. Improvements were made in the 1950s and 1960s, and the works were eventually demolished in 2002 to make way for Terminal 5.

The settled sludge of the large Mogden Sewage Treatment Works (West Middlesex Sewage Treatment Works) in Isleworth/Twickenham was pumped west to Perry Oaks for further settling and conversion for use in agriculture in pelleted or powder form as biosolids. Sales were eventually stopped because of the possibility of contamination with toxic metals.

Timeline of the sludge works

- 12 June 1931: Middlesex County Council bought the site for £33,000 from W.Whittington & Son, the owners of Perry Oaks farm; it was orchard then.
- 1934: It occupied 220 acres (89 ha); later enlarged.
- 1937: A portable 2-foot (610 mm) gauge railway was in use on the beds to transport sewage sludge.
- 1944: The Air Ministry, when taking over Heathrow, tried to take over the sludge works, but for obvious basic hygiene the sludge needed somewhere to be treated, which forced Middlesex County Council to resist; after a volcanic official row the Air Ministry admitted defeat and had to change its plans.
- 1952: The early circular concrete tanks were supplemented with large rectangular tanks, and later by a series of lagoons.
- 1960s: A large dried sludge storage/collection area was built.
- 1965: This was augmented by installing a conveyor system.
  - Both were replaced by centrifuges able to discharge directly into parked trailer units.
- 2002: The second-stage works forming the whole site was replaced by Terminal 5, preceded by a detailed archaeological dig over the area.

It has been inferred that the route of the under-pressure sludge sewer, which needed access points to prevent blockages, could have stopped the building of the airport. He states if it had gone across the Heathrow fields area, e.g. straight from Harlington Corner to Perry Oaks, the amount of work and time in wartime needed to divert it would have stopped the airport from being developed.

== Education ==
Heathrow School was founded in 1875, as Heathrow Elementary School, on land given by George Stevens Byng, 2nd Earl of Strafford by the north side of Bath Road. The school opened two years later and was enlarged in 1891. In time the school was renamed 'Sipson and Heathrow School', because more than half its pupils came from Sipson.

After the construction of Heathrow Airport started in 1944, the school was affected by aircraft noise from the north runway. Pupils from the few Perry Oaks cottages for more than a year travelled by taxi to avoid construction works, until its sludge-to-fertiliser farm led to the end of almost all its homes. In 1962 the school lost its playing field when an airport access road was built and four years later it moved to Harmondsworth Lane in Sipson, and became Heathrow School again. The school's current logo is a Concorde in flight.

== See also ==
- Charlton, Bristol, another village in England which was demolished to make room for an airport
