= Mogden Sewage Treatment Works =

Sewage treatment works in London, England

Coordinates: 51.4630°N 0.3402°W

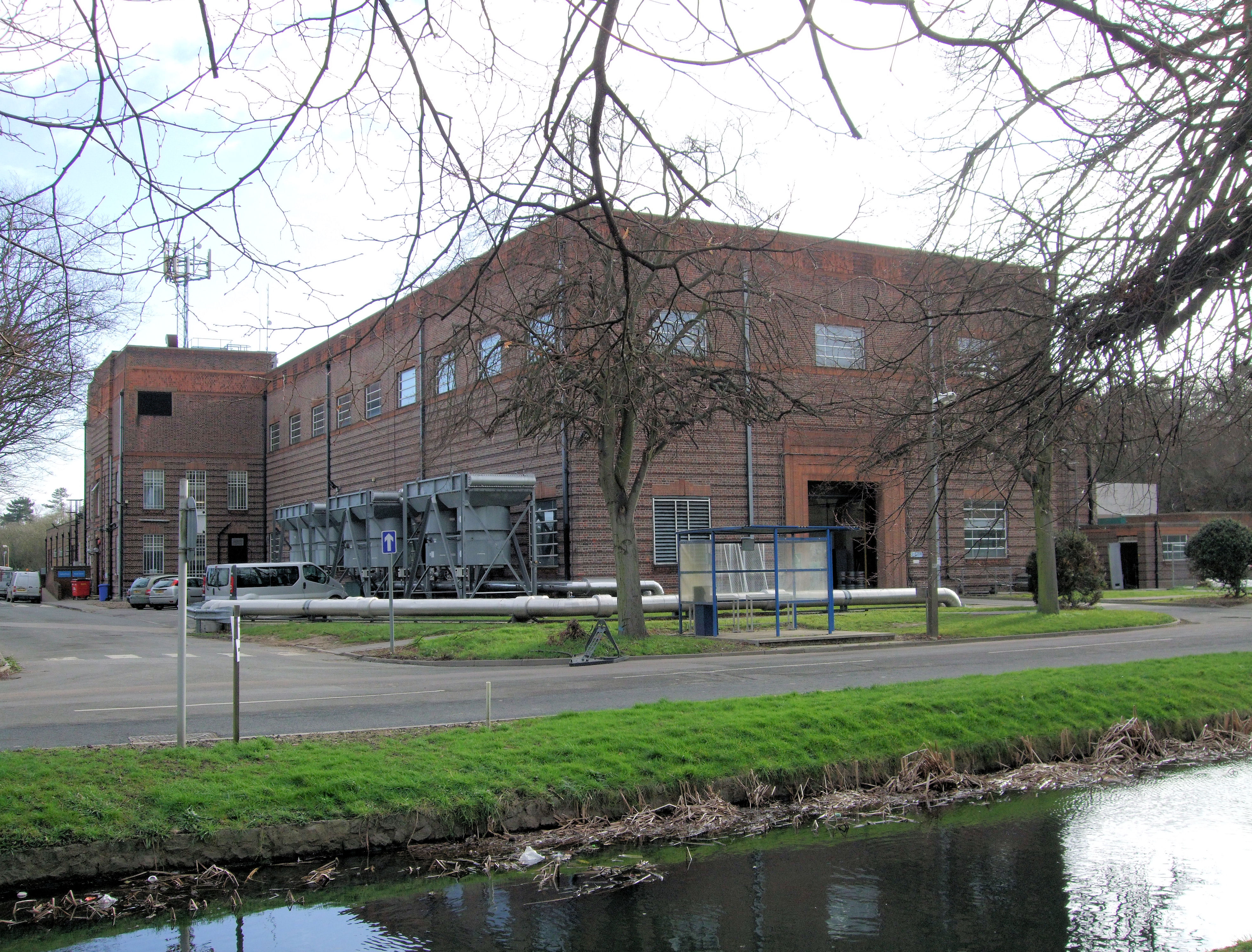
Mogden Sewage Treatment Works

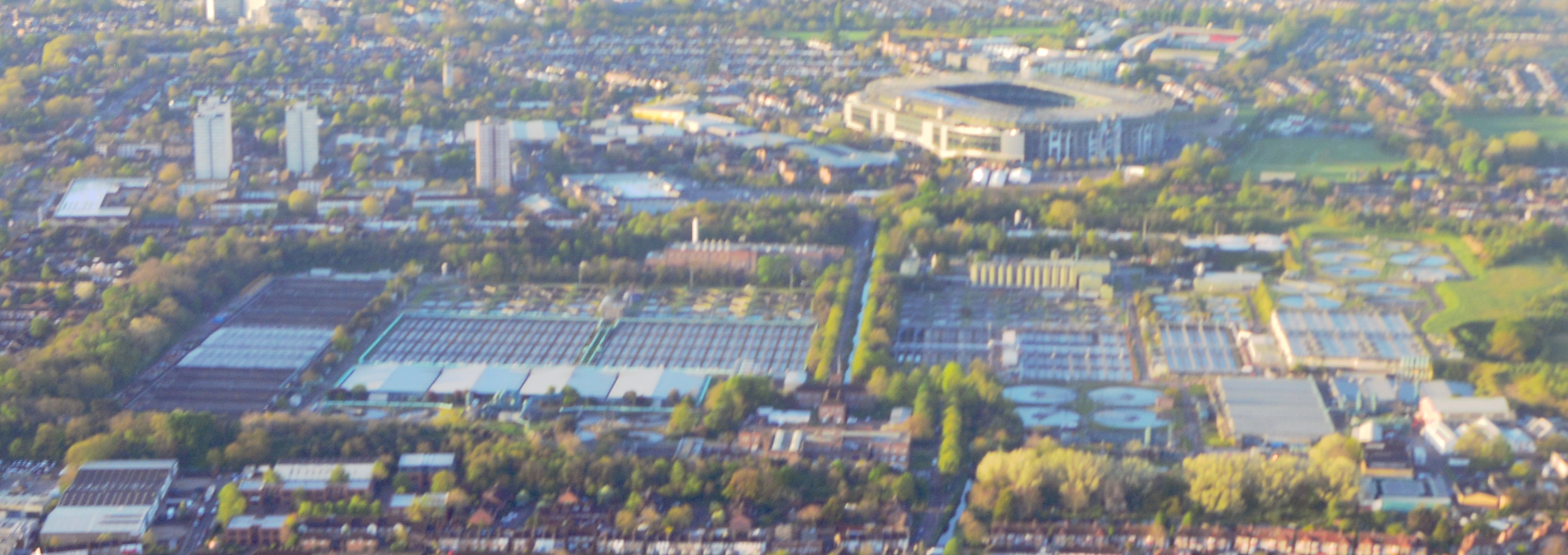
Aerial view, looking south, 2024. Twickenham Stadium at top, right of center.

Mogden Sewage Treatment Works is a sewage treatment plant in the Ivybridge section of Isleworth, west London, England, formerly known as Mogden. Built in 1931–36 by Middlesex County Council and now operated by Thames Water, it is the third largest sewage works in the United Kingdom. The site covers 55 hectares (140 acres).

It treats the waste water from three main sewers serving the northwest quarter of Outer London and two further ones from the south and south-west.

== History ==
=== Middlesex County Council Act ===
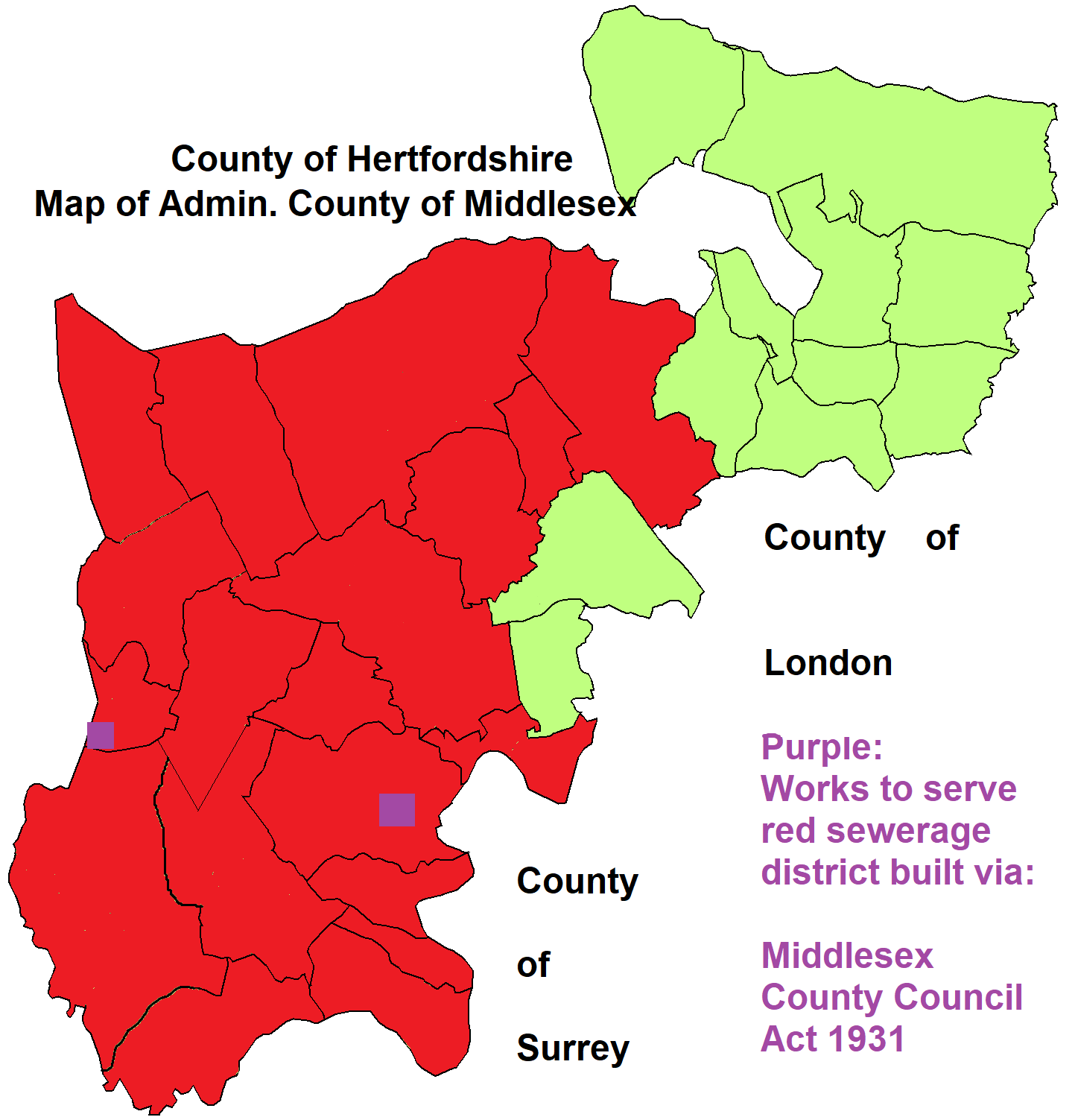
Map of the former Administrative County of Middlesex, the red of which is still foul-drained and used to be sludge-dried by the new (in purple) works built by the 1931 act

The Middlesex County Council Act 1931 is solely devoted to the scheme's construction and mitigations, comprising 78 sections and three schedules. Its work 1 is this works, works 2 to 5 are main sewers rising in Hendon, Uxbridge, Harrow and Staines. The Teddington main also connects, as fed into the new sewer 5d from works of Twickenham Corporation.

The sewerage district (catchment) was defined as those districts named after: Brentford & Chiswick, Ealing, Feltham, Harrow, Hayes & Harlington, Hendon (both), Heston & Isleworth, Kingsbury, Ruislip-Northwood, Southall-Norwood, Staines, Sunbury-on-Thames, Teddington, Uxbridge, Wealdstone, Wembley, Yiewsley & West Drayton. The second schedule lists the compulsory purchases by plan reference. The third schedule sets the minimum standard of purity of 30 ppm of suspended solids in treated effluent and secondly to "not take up more than" 20 ppm of dissolved oxygen in five days at 65 °F (18 °C).

=== Treatment works ===
The plant was built in 1931–36 for £1.7 million by Middlesex County Council, replacing 28 small sewage treatment facilities as part of the West Middlesex (Mogden-Perry Oaks) Main Drainage Scheme, which had a total estimated cost of £5.25 million (equivalent to £381,000,000 in 2023). The council enlarged the sewage operation at Mogden Farm, buying 101 acres (41 ha) of it, after the public and Duke of Northumberland objected to a Syon Park proposal. 110 kilometres (68 mi) of sewers were built to connect to it, and the Duke of Northumberland's River was straightened out as a source of coolant. The plant began operations in late 1935 and was formally opened with the rest of the scheme on 23 October 1936 by the then Minister of Health, Sir Kingsley Wood. In its first year of operation it treated an average of 60,020,000 gallons of sewage per day.

From 1935 the treatment facilities at Mogden comprised storm water tanks, primary sedimentation, sewage aeration, final separation and sludge digestion. The plant was designed to treat three million cubic metres per day of sewage.

Treatment tanks at Mogden sewage treatment works, 1935
Service	No.	Type
Storm water tanks	8	Rectangular
Primary sedimentation tanks	8	Circular
Secondary sedimentation tanks	4	Rectangular
Aeration tanks	Battery A, 6 Battery B, 6 Battery C, 3	Rectangular
Final separating tanks	52	Circular
Sludge digestion tanks	12	Circular

The works were expanded in 1962, 1989 and 1991 and upgraded in 1996–2002. The 1962 extension included commutators, grit chambers and pre-aeration tanks, together with the following additional tanks.

Additional treatment tanks at Mogden sewage treatment works, 1962
Service	No.	Type
Sedimentation tanks	4	Circular
Aeration tanks	Battery C, 3	Rectangular
Final separating tanks	12	Circular
Sludge digestion tanks	4	Circular

The most recent expansion, in 2011–13, increased the treatment capacity by more than half and increased the plant's size by 19.5 hectares (48 acres), as part of the Thames Tideway Scheme to improve water quality in the River Thames. It was completed in summer 2013.

== Technical approach ==
When built, the Mogden works were very modern, one of the first large-scale applications of the activated sludge technique for sewage treatment. The plant was also advanced in having a central control board for measurements and in using the methane generated by sewage treatment to generate electricity and heat from the processing to heat the sludge. It was originally equipped with oil and spark-ignition gas engines; a heat and power plant was added in 1993. In 1974 the works were selling surplus methane for £12,000 a year (equivalent to £160,000 in 2023); the latest upgrade enables them to meet 40% of their energy requirements from methane.

Initially, after approximately 25 days at Mogden, sludge was piped to settling ponds at the Perry Oaks Sludge Treatment Works near Heathrow Airport. In 1989 the Perry Oaks site was closed and the land reclaimed for Heathrow Terminal 5 with new sludge dewatering provided at nearby Iver South.

There is a plant for dosing the effluent with hydrogen peroxide before the outfall pipes. This is operated on the instruction of the Environment Agency if the stormtanks are overflowing and discharging into the effluent channel. The peroxide prevents low oxygen conditions developing in the tidal sections of the river that receive the flows. During dry weather with low flows the effluent from Mogden can constitute the main part of the flow in the river.

An effluent oxygenation plant was under construction in the late 2010s, consisting of an array of aerators that can be lowered into the effluent channel to increase the dissolved oxygen levels in the effluent. This would only operate during very dry weather to ensure that when flows in the river Thames are low oxygen levels in the Upper Thames Tideway are kept high enough to encourage salmonid migrations and ensure a healthy aquatic ecosystem. This will be the first such effluent aeration plant in the UK.

== Finances ==
Mogden is the namesake of the Mogden formula, used to estimate the cost of wastewater treatment.

== Environmental complaints ==
The Mogden works discharges effluent at Isleworth Ait, on the Tideway which is the western half of the Thames Estuary, centred on London's centre. Between 1956 and the completion of an expansion in 1962, some of this had not received secondary treatment. Also during heavy rain, the plant was sometimes overwhelmed and released untreated sewage into the river; in summer 2011, 200,000 tonnes of untreated sewage from Mogden contributed to a large fish kill. Nearby residents have also complained about odour: the Borough of Hounslow served an odour abatement notice on Thames Water in 2001, and in 2011 complainants won a court judgement that the company had failed since 1990 to adequately manage odour and thereby violated human rights; £19,000 in damages to ten people were assessed.

In January 2022 a report published by the Environmental Audit Committee found that Mogden discharged enough sewage to fill 400 Olympic-sized swimming pools on 3 and 4 October 2020. It added that during the whole of 2020, 3.5 billion litres of untreated sewage entered the Thames from Mogden - seven times as much as was dumped in 2016. Thames Water's 2025 documentary Thames Water: Inside the Crisis features Mogden employees talking about inadequate investment on maintenance and equipment upgrades making it difficult to prevent sewage discharges.
