= Middlesex Hospital (disambiguation) =

Middlesex Hospital may refer to:

- Middlesex Hospital, a teaching hospital located in the Fitzrovia area of London, England, closed 2005
- North Middlesex Hospital, a District General Hospital (DGH) in Edmonton in the London Borough of Enfield
- West Middlesex Hospital, an acute NHS hospital in Isleworth, west London
- Central Middlesex Hospital, a hospital in Park Royal, London
- South Middlesex Hospital, a hospital in Isleworth, closed 1991
- Middlesex Hospital (Connecticut)
- Middlesex Hospital in New Brunswick, New Jersey, now Robert Wood Johnson University Hospital
