= Longford, London =

Suburban village in London, England

Coordinates: 51.4777°N 0.4943°W

Longford
- Village
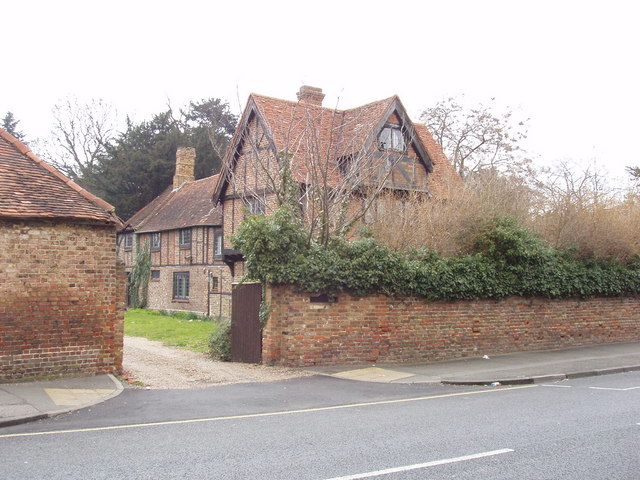
- King Henry's 'Public House' and The Stables, brick infilled timber-frame older homes, 2006

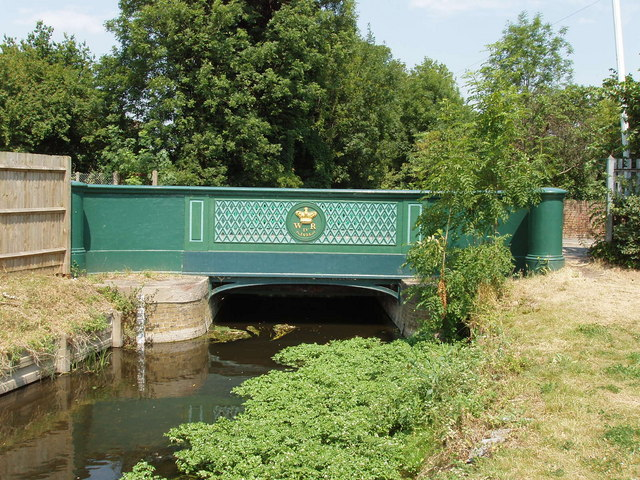
- Bridge over the 17th century-created Longford River, 2006

- Location within Greater London
- OS grid reference: TQ045765
  - Charing Cross: 15.8 mi (25.4 km) E
- London borough: Hillingdon
- Ceremonial county: Greater London
- Region: London
- Country: England
- Sovereign state: United Kingdom
- Post town: WEST DRAYTON
- Postcode district: UB7
- Dialling code: 01753
- Police: Metropolitan
- Fire: London
- Ambulance: London
- UK Parliament: Hayes and Harlington
- London Assembly: Ealing and Hillingdon

Longford is a suburban village in the London Borough of Hillingdon, England. It is immediately north-west of London Heathrow Airport, which is in the same borough. It is the westernmost settlement in Greater London, very close to the borders of both Berkshire and Surrey.

It was formerly part of Harmondsworth by tithes, land tax, vestry and still by Church of England parish. As it has never had a church it can also be considered a hamlet. Until 1965 it was in the historic county of Middlesex.

Longford is 16 miles (25.5 km) west of Charing Cross and within the M25 motorway, which marks its western boundary with Colnbrook, Berkshire.

The village is currently earmarked for demolition as a result of the expansion of nearby Heathrow Airport.

== Etymology ==
The name Longford derives from the two words "long" and "ford", after the wide ford across the Colne which is where the old Bath Road crosses it, a middle ditch, and the Wraysbury River, carrying on west from the village street. Its old country residents pronounced its name as "Long Ford" with both syllables stressed.

== History ==
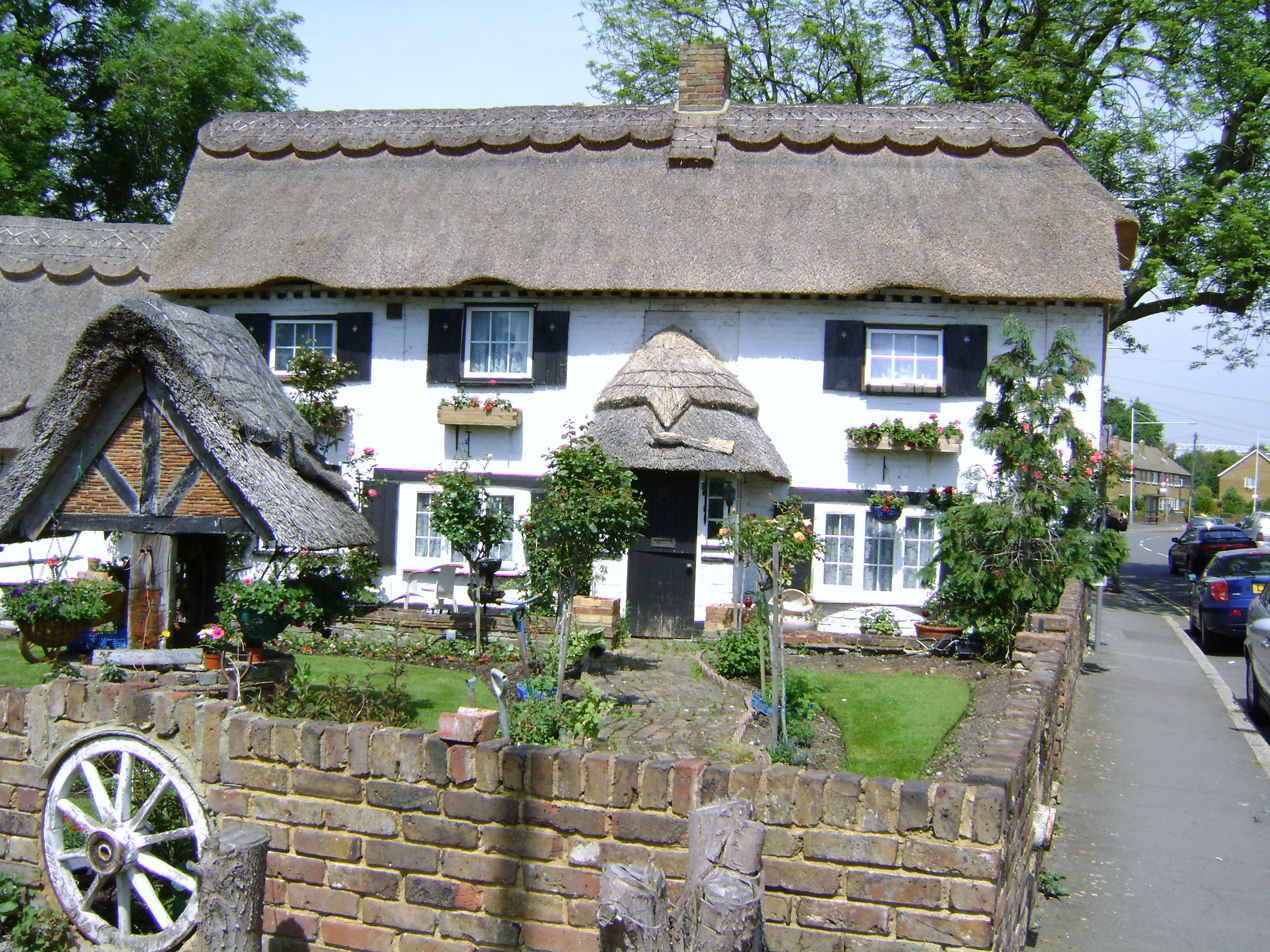
Thatched roof cottage in Longford

The settlement developed by this multi-channel ford of the River Colne and its distributaries, which presented numerous obstacles for travellers to and from the west of the edge of Middlesex, on the old Bath Road west out of London. Longford may be founded on a small Saxon settlement dating from the 5th to 7th century AD. Historic buildings survive from the medieval and immediate post-medieval periods. Limited evidence survives of Roman occupation, though archaeological excavations have revealed two brooches of Roman date.

Longford, the only medieval settlement to grow up along the Bath Road in Middlesex, had 30 inhabited buildings in 1337. An important part of the parish economy, aside from its four manor houses, 48 houses were on Moor and Sheep Lanes in Harmondsworth.

In 1586 land on either side of the river was charged with the upkeep of Mad Bridge, which carried the Bath Road across the river. During the 18th and early 19th centuries this bridge was maintained by the Colnbrook turnpike trustees, who presumably erected in 1834 the bridge with cast-iron parapets which now stands.

Rocque's map of 1754, shows clearly the settlement pattern: at Longford, Harmondsworth, Sipson there were small compact groups of houses, and a straggling group at Heathrow. At Longford they lined both sides of the Bath Road from the east bank of the Longford River up to and across the Duke of Northumberland's River.

The uncultivated area west of the rivers was to the north known as Harmondsworth moors, south of the Bath Road the area between the Colne and the Longford rivers was meadowland and, between the Longford and the Duke's rivers, arable.

Parliament's Act of common land inclosure (privatisation) came to Harmondsworth parish in 1819; in it Harmondsworth's three open fields and Harmondsworth Moor and a big tract to and around Heathrow (part of Hounslow Heath) were divided among the local residents. During this Enclosure two bad bends of the Bath Road in Longford were straightened.

By 1839 Longford and Harmondsworth and Sipson had a shop serving the whole parish.

In 1929 the Longford and Colnbrook by-pass was built.

In 1930 the Road Research Laboratory on the Colnbrook by-pass opened. In the same year the Fairey Aviation Company opened an airfield, the Great West Aerodrome, southeast of Heathrow village.

About 1930 a brickworks was set up east of the junction of Cain's Lane and Heathrow Road in Heathrow. Later the quarry's main purpose changed to excavating sand and gravel. The quarry company went bankrupt in 1943; after 1944 the airport obliterated the quarry along with every trace of Heathrow village.

Middlesex County Council opened a large sewage sludge settlement works west of Perry Oaks farm; in the 1990s it was removed and Heathrow Airport's Terminal 5 is there now.

In 1648 the first bridge across the then-new Longford River was demolished. This had been replaced by 1675. In the 19th century, when it was called Stone Bridge, the Crown, not a local authority, was responsible for its upkeep and by 1960 it had been renamed King's Bridge.

== Geography ==
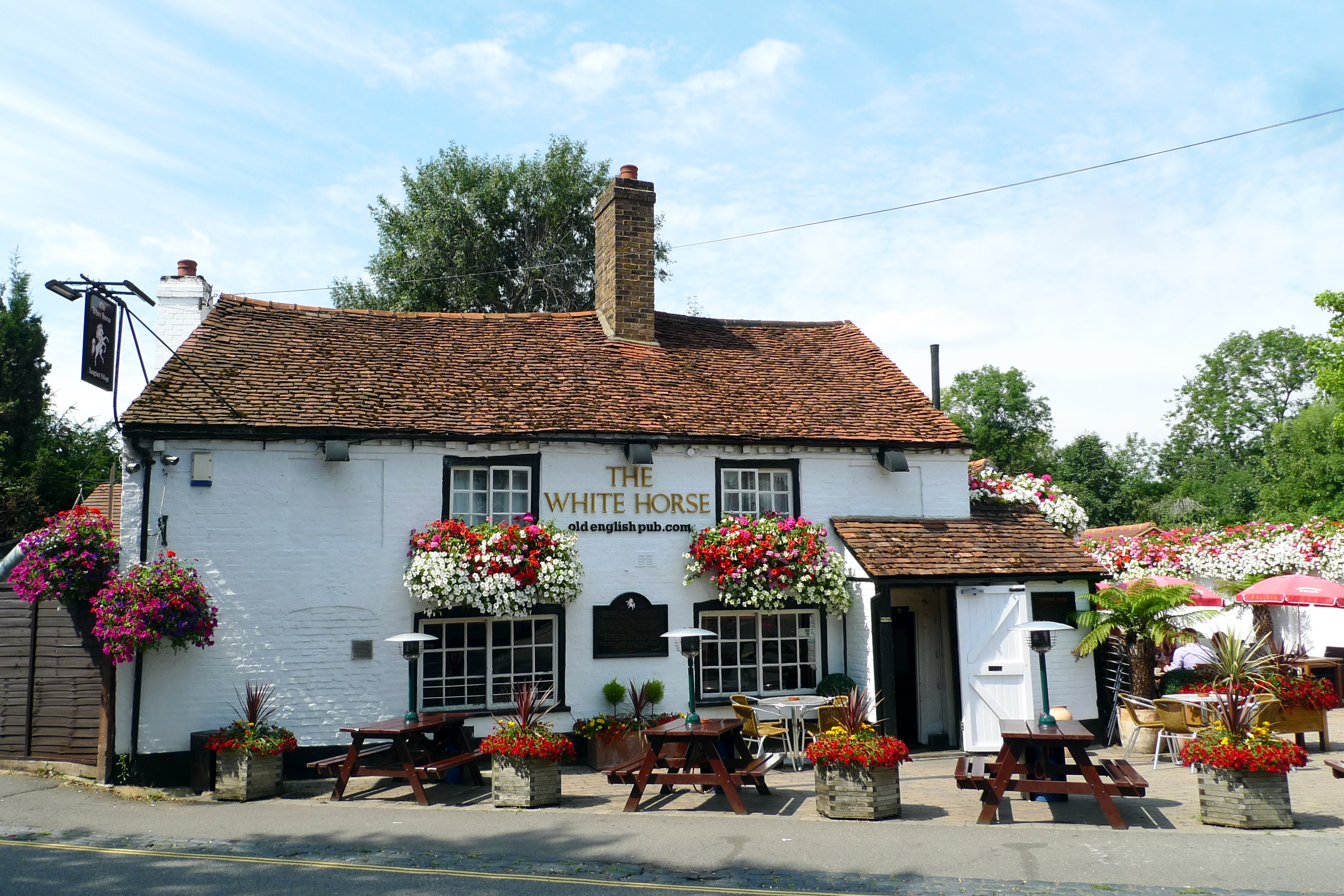
The White Horse pub, Bath Road

Longford village is a linear development astride the Bath Road immediately north of Heathrow Airport and as such to the south of the M4, It is also immediately north of Heathrow's Western Perimeter Road. The area is characterized by an historic village core and similar-sized green buffer zones.

The last bridge or ford in the west over the Wraysbury River marked the boundary of Colnbrook which has been superseded by the M25 motorway which the road then crosses over.

The Duke of Northumberland's River that runs from here to Isleworth since its construction in or about 1543.

=== Soil and elevation ===
Elevation is an almost uniform 22 metres (72 ft).

Longford's soil is the rich western soil of the historic parish of Harmondsworth, being alluvial. Shortly south of the main street gravel is instead close to the surface except near rivers and northeastward of the village, and less fertile clay soil dominates for many miles.

=== Transport ===
Immediately to the north is a purpose-built bypass with a western junction connected A4, to the M4 that is, which is parallel and has two junction with this road also directly north of Heathrow airport, with the newer Junction 14 for Terminal 5 a very limited access junction, for the airport roads only.

Access to the M25 motorway is considerably shortest to the south, at Junction 14 (Stanwell Moor).

The Bath Road (A4) is an arterial road and traffic along it became so dense so early that in 1928 a bypass to Longford and Colnbrook was opened.

The village is directly served by two bus routes: the 81, operated by London Buses, which runs from Hounslow to Slough; and the 423, operated by London United, which runs from Hounslow to the bus station at Heathrow's Terminal 5.

== Landmarks ==
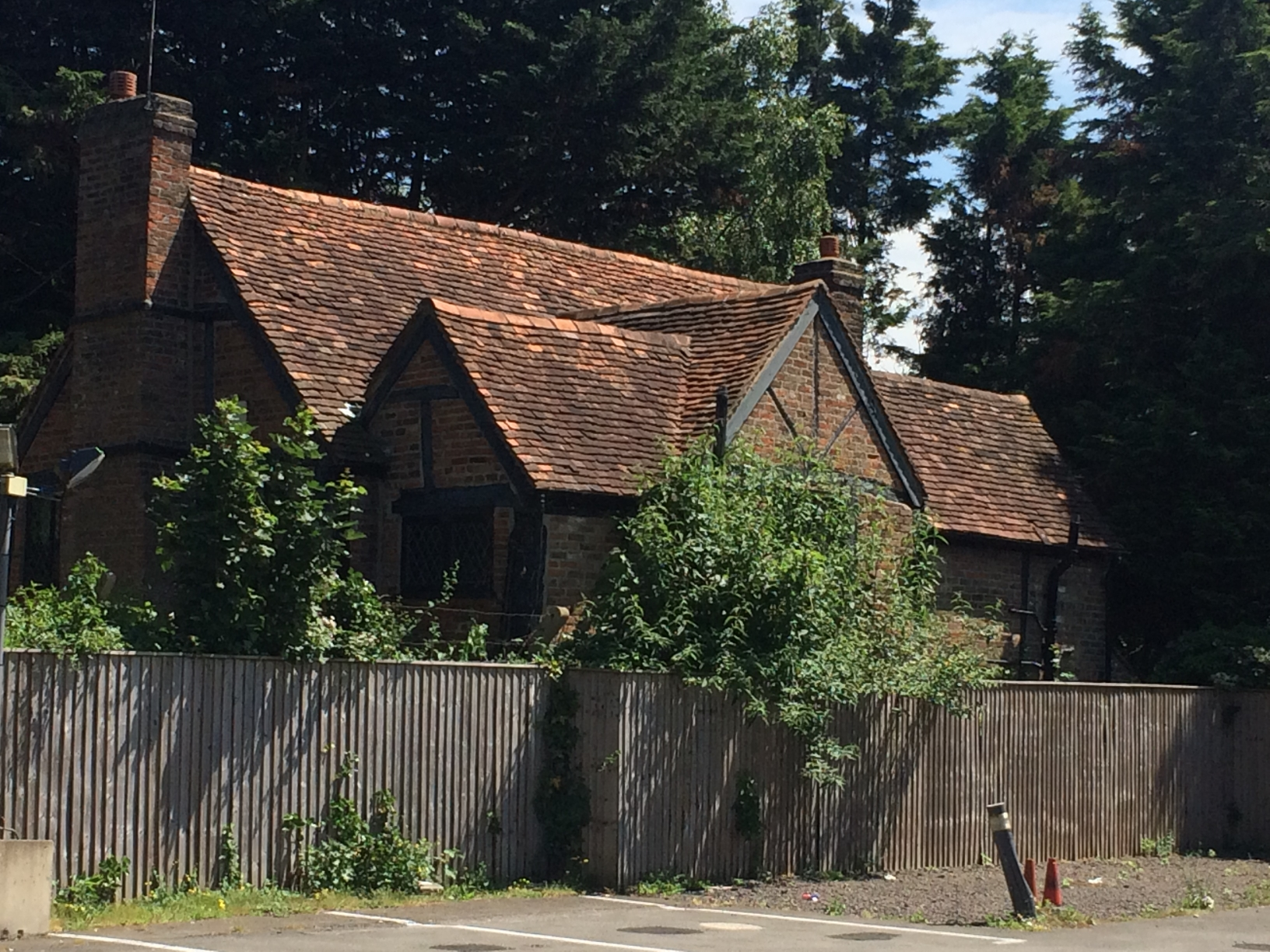
Longford Meeting House

Longford retains an old-fashioned community centre character, in particular a former and an existing public house which are listed buildings only at Grade II mostly on age rather than simply architecture. An old building, Yeomans, which has been subdivided into three flats is listed. Other listed buildings include Longford Meeting House, Queen River Cottage and adjoining Willow Tree Cottage, and King's Bridge which is the name of the 1834-built main bridge by the very last building at the west end of the (old) Bath Road street, which crosses the nearby siphoned off Longford River, which Charles I had constructed — this feeds Bushy Park and Hampton Court Gardens.

One of the listed cottages is thatched.

== Longford Village Conservation Area ==
Much of the land surrounding the village of Longford is within the Metropolitan Green Belt. Many of its buildings are included in the Longford Village Conservation Area, which was designated in 1988 with a minor boundary change in 1999. It includes seven listed buildings, one listed wall and a number of unlisted properties which are considered to make an important contribution to the character and appearance of the Conservation Area.

== Effect of Heathrow's proposed third runway ==
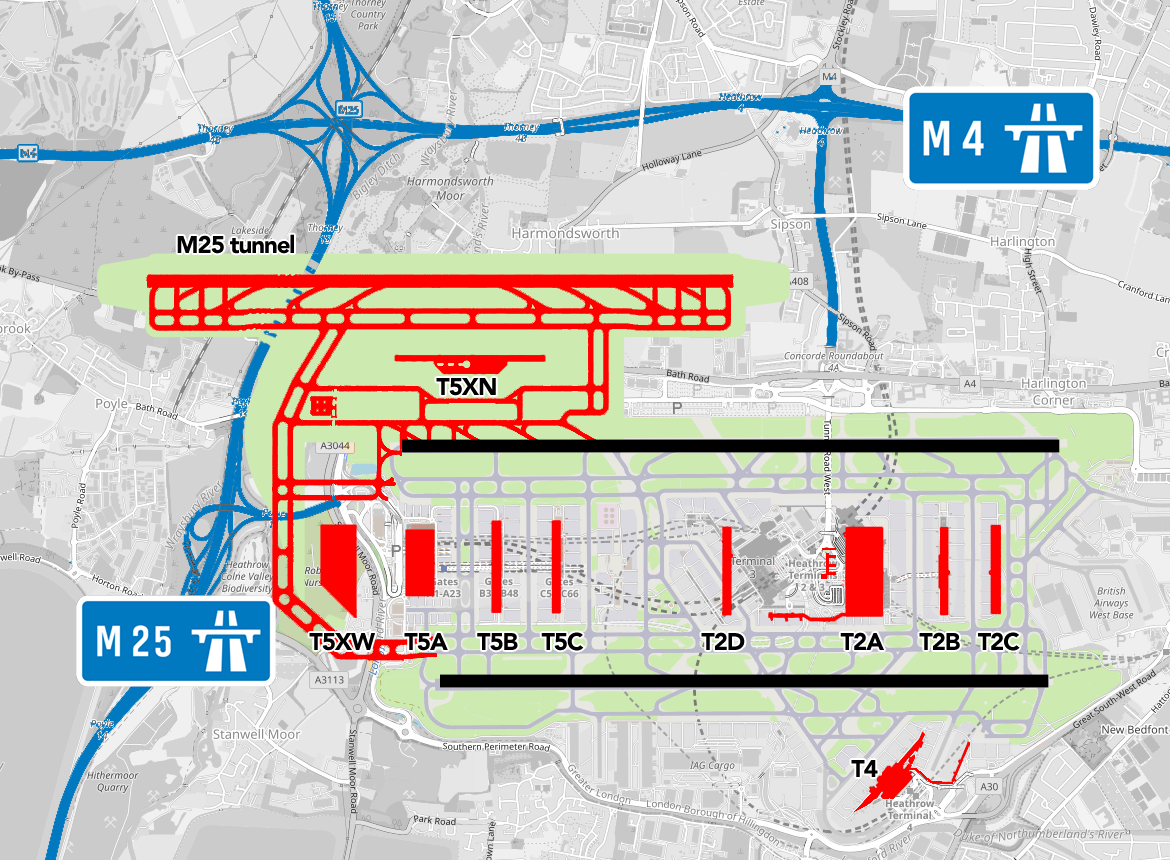
Map of the 2025 Heathrow Airport expansion scheme

On 1 July 2015, the Airports Commission recommended that the Government approve Heathrow Airport having a third runway in the form of the Northwest Runway scheme put forward by Heathrow Airport Ltd. The plan on page 99 of the Airports Commission report confirms that the proposal requires the demolition of every building at Longford. The stages involved in bringing forward the proposed development are set out on the Heathrow Expansion website.

In 2025, Transport Secretary Heidi Alexander has announced that the government had chosen to proceed with the Heathrow Airport expansion proposal. It was confirmed that construction of a third runway would involve diverting the M25 motorway through a tunnel and demolition of Longford in its entirety.

== Religion ==
Of residents of the output area Hillingdon 31A (Cranford, Longford and West Harmondsworth) 938 people (or 51.2%) declared themselves to be Christian in 2011. Also in this area 11.9% of people were Muslim, 11% Sikh, 1.9% Buddhist, 13.3% of no recognised religion, 5.9% gave no religious status and 1% were of other religions.

The ecclesiastical parish of the Church of England remains in Harmondsworth at St Mary's.

- www.stmarysharmondsworth.com

The Catholic Church have a church in central West Drayton to the north, as well as three chaplains who serve St George's Chapel in Heathrow's inner ring west or the Sunday Mass at Terminals 4 and 5.

Gurdwaras exist on Martindale and Hanworth Road, Hounslow, the latter being Sri Guru Singh Sabha. The nearest Islamic centre is the Al-Falah Muslim Centre, Tavistock Road, Yiewsley to the north.

== See also ==
- Heathrow (hamlet), a settlement demolished in the 1940s for the construction of London Airport
