= Mogden formula =

Pricing strategy in sewage treatment

In the sewage treatment, the Mogden formula is a pricing strategy used to estimate the difficulty in treating industrial wastewater. It is named after Mogden Sewage Treatment Works.

The Mogden formula calculates cost as a combination (empirical coefficients) of volume, strength in terms of normal treatment oxidation demand and the suspended solids proportion. Applicable to the whole works, it also approximates the cost for tested industrial waste water that may, if treatable, be lawfully sent to a regular sewage works.

The Mogden formula is:

C = R + [(V + Bv) or M] + B(Ot/Os) + S(St/Ss)

where:

C = charge per volume of effluent (£/m^{3})
R = reception and conveyance charge [£/m^{3}]
V = primary treatment (volumetric) charge [£/m^{3}]
Bv = additional volume charge for biological treatment [£/m^{3}]
M = treatment and disposal charge where effluent goes to sea outfall [£/m^{3}]
B = biological oxidation of settled sewage charge [£/m^{3}]
Ot = chemical oxygen demand (COD) of effluent after one hour of quiescent settlements at pH 7 [mg/litre]
Os = chemical oxygen demand (COD) of effluent after one hour of quiescent settlement [mg/litre]
S = treatment and disposal of primary sewage sludge charge [£/m^{3} or £/kg]
St = total suspended solids of effluent at pH 7 [mg/litre]
Ss = total suspended solids of effluent [mg/litre]

Thus the less biologically friendly the effluent (see wastewater quality indicators including pH), and more solid-laden, the higher the charge should be for treating the lawful effluent.
