= Ivybridge (Isleworth) =

Housing estate in Isleworth, west London, England

Coordinates: 51.4597°N 0.3401°W

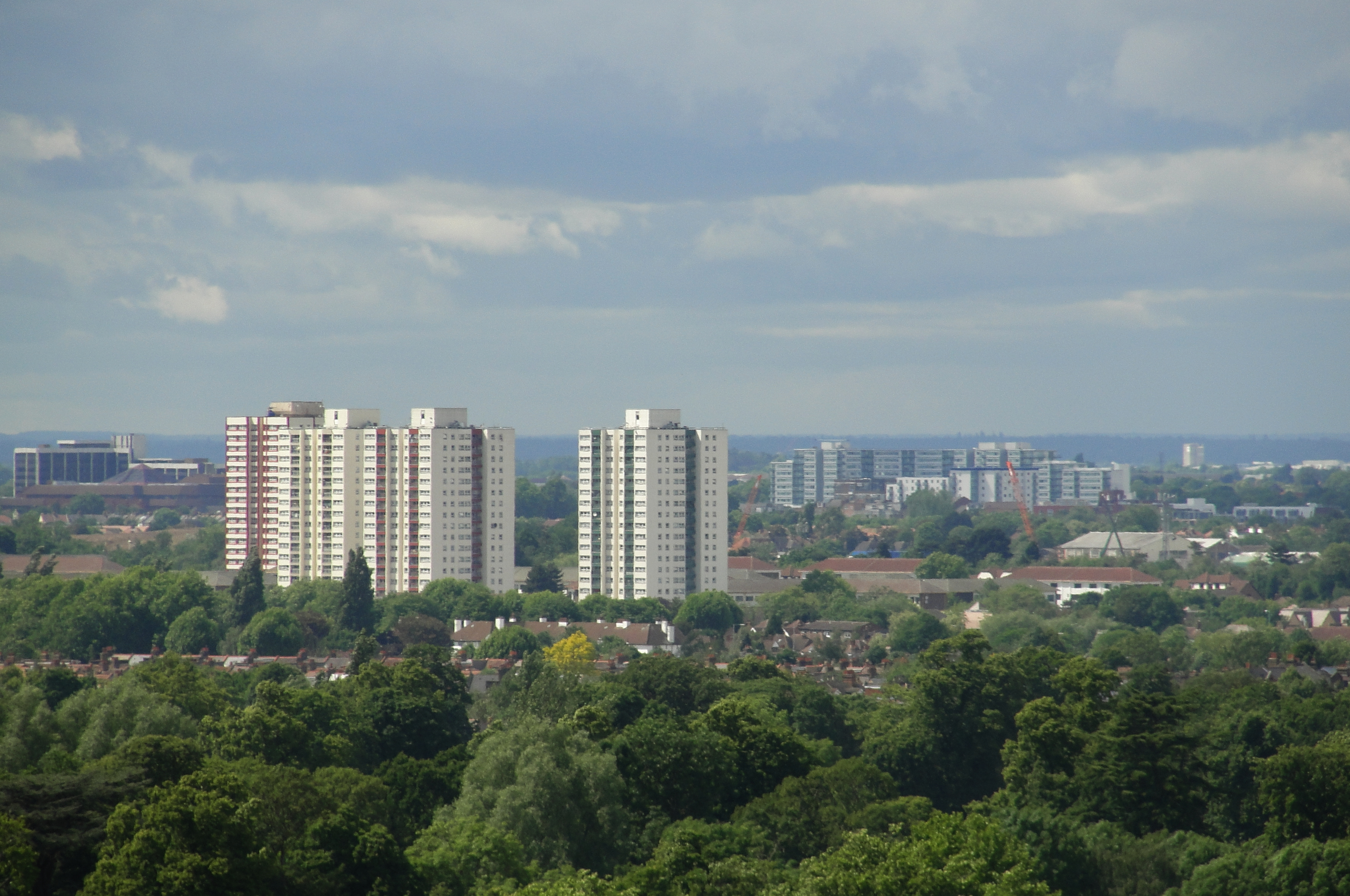
Ivybridge tower blocks viewed from Richmond Hill

Ivybridge, formerly Mogden, is a housing estate in the southern part of Isleworth in West London. Formerly agricultural, it was the site of Mogden Isolation Hospital, later South Middlesex Hospital, from 1897 to 1991.

The area is usually now called Ivybridge rather than Mogden. The Ivybridge estate is a council development with four tower blocks, new build houses, and various different play area's and shopping centers. The area borders between Isleworth and Twickenham, and is close to Twickenham Stadium, the home ground of the England national rugby team.

== History ==
The area was formerly agricultural. In the early 19th century, Michael Keens developed two commercially important varieties of strawberry, Keens' Imperial and Keens' Seedling, on Worton Lane. In the 1890s, George Tebbutt was growing prize-winning damsons and lilies at Mogden House. The 18th-century house survives in Bankside Close.

== River ==
The Ivy Bridge itself is situated where London Road crosses Midway Brook, to the south of the Ivybridge retail park.

The Duke of Northumberland's River flows through Ivybridge and was diverted to provide coolant for the sewage treatment plant. It is aboveground except for a small section near the main works buildings. The public footpath alongside it forms part of the Crane Walk.

== Hospital ==
Mogden Isolation Hospital opened in July 1891 as a hospital for infectious diseases. In 1939 it became South Middlesex EMS Hospital and in 1948, under the National Health Service, South Middlesex Hospital. During the Second World War it served many gynaecological surgery patients; from 1955 it housed the regional eye unit; by 1983 it was primarily a psychogeriatric facility. It closed in 1991. The site, on the south side of Mogden Lane near its junction with Whitton Dene, was sold and is now occupied by housing, a Tesco supermarket and a filling station.
