= Sipson =

Coordinates: 51.487°N 0.456°W

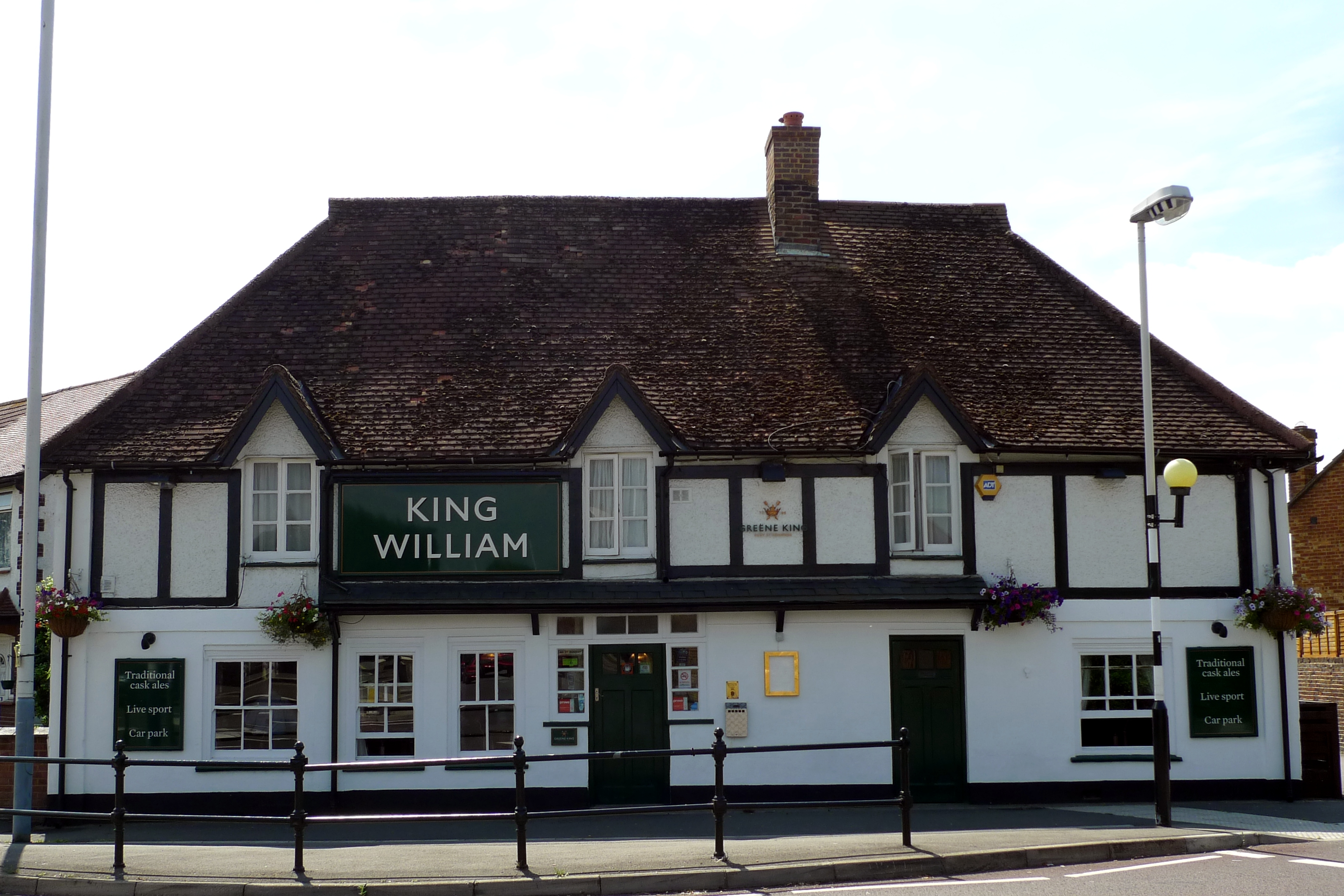
- King William IV public house

- Location within Greater London
- OS grid reference: TQ075785
  - Charing Cross: 14.3 mi (23.0 km) E
- London borough: Hillingdon
- Ceremonial county: Greater London
- Region: London
- Country: England
- Sovereign state: United Kingdom
- Post town: WEST DRAYTON
- Postcode district: UB7
- Dialling code: 020
- Police: Metropolitan
- Fire: London
- Ambulance: London
- UK Parliament: Hayes and Harlington
- London Assembly: Ealing and Hillingdon

Sipson is a village in the London Borough of Hillingdon, the westernmost borough of Greater London, England. It is 14.3 miles (23 km) west of Charing Cross and near the north perimeter of London Heathrow Airport.

== History ==
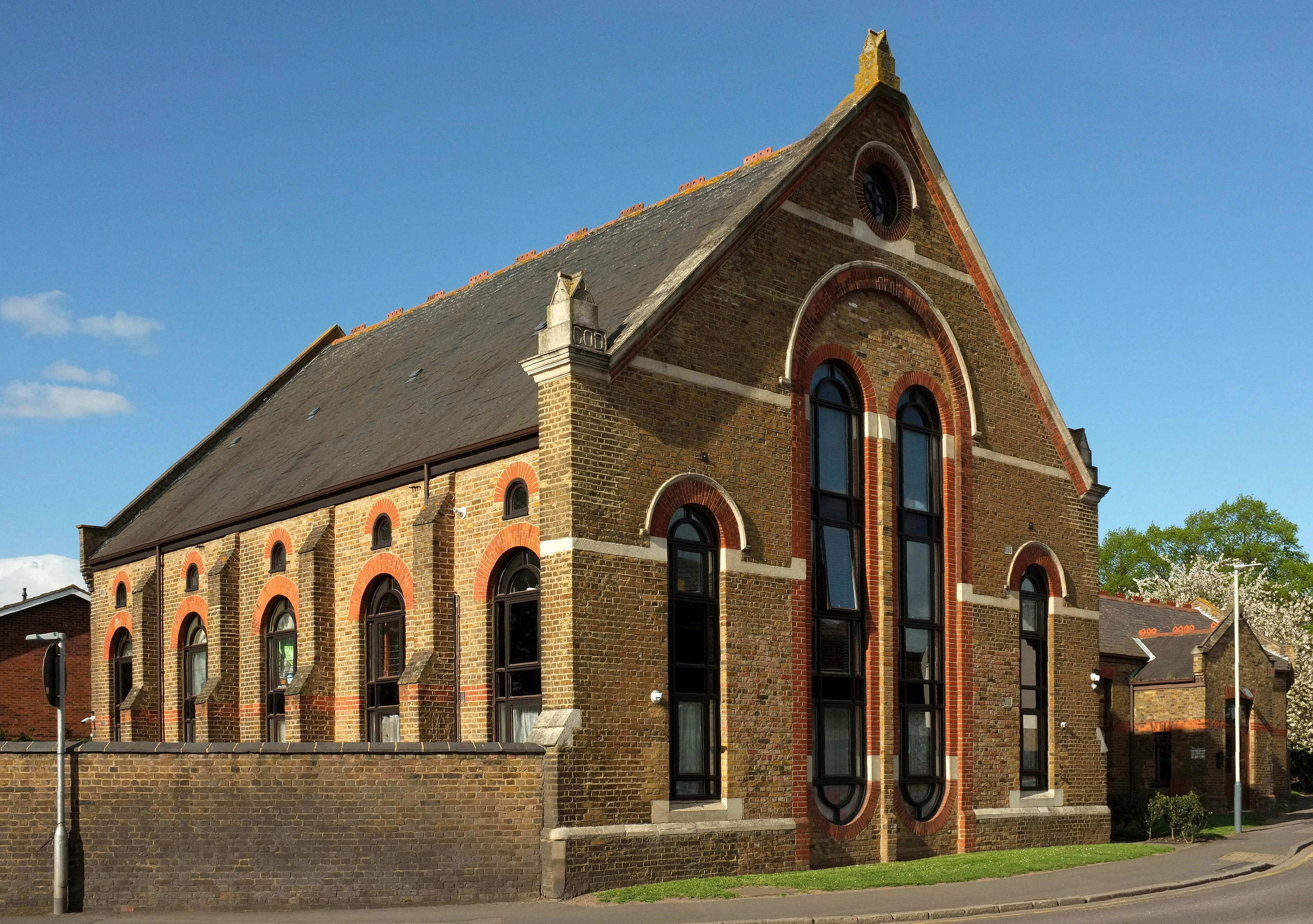
Sipson Christian Fellowship building

=== Toponymy ===
The village's name was recorded as Sibwineston c. 1150 and as Sibeston in 1341. It comes from the Anglo-Saxon Sibwines tūn, "Sibwine's homestead or village".

=== Expansion from a minor hamlet ===
The place was a farmstead, one of three in Harmondsworth parish, south and east of the heart of that village. It had by the 1890s grown in population and gained a chapel at Sipson Green, where 18th century cottages were at the end of what by 1910 had become a semi built-up village street or lane leading to the earlier farmstead and farm workers cottages. All of these places, as today, lie north of the famous "Bath Road" (the modern A4), which linked London to Bath.

=== Heathrow expansion ===
On 10 January 1946 the British Cabinet agreed Stage 3 of the airport, which was an extension north of the Bath Road, with a large triangle of 3 runways, obliterating Sipson and most of Harlington, and diverting the Bath Road.

In 2009 the majority of the village was under threat of demolition owing to the planned expansion of London Heathrow Airport, which would have created a third runway at the airport. However, in March 2010 in accordance with multilateral environmental regulations and evidence that gas pollutant thresholds would be further breached within the wider area the English High Court of Justice ruled that the plan which the Department had submitted must be reconsidered. Accordingly, the Government announced in May 2010 that the third runway plan had been cancelled but that a long-term study into airport capacity in the South East and beyond may recommend expansion to any of the London Airports where the environmental constraints can all be met. Since 2009 BAA have been acquiring property in Sipson and elsewhere when advertised for sale which means there will be fewer resident owners to oppose further plans for expansion with a third runway. Contrary to this movement, opponents such as actress Emma Thompson and various others have bought land within the boundaries in 2009 with a view to preventing such expansion. In addition to this there has been a long term occupation of land within Sipson by climate activists on the invitation of local residents, following the latest Climate Camp. Grow Heathrow is a squatted community, opposed to the expansion of Heathrow airport and committed to finding sustainable alternatives in the face of climate change, peak oil and economic crises. On 2020-02-27 A court ruled the expansion unlawful in a case brought by environmental groups, councils and the Mayor of London. The court said the government would not appeal against the judgement.

=== Businesses ===
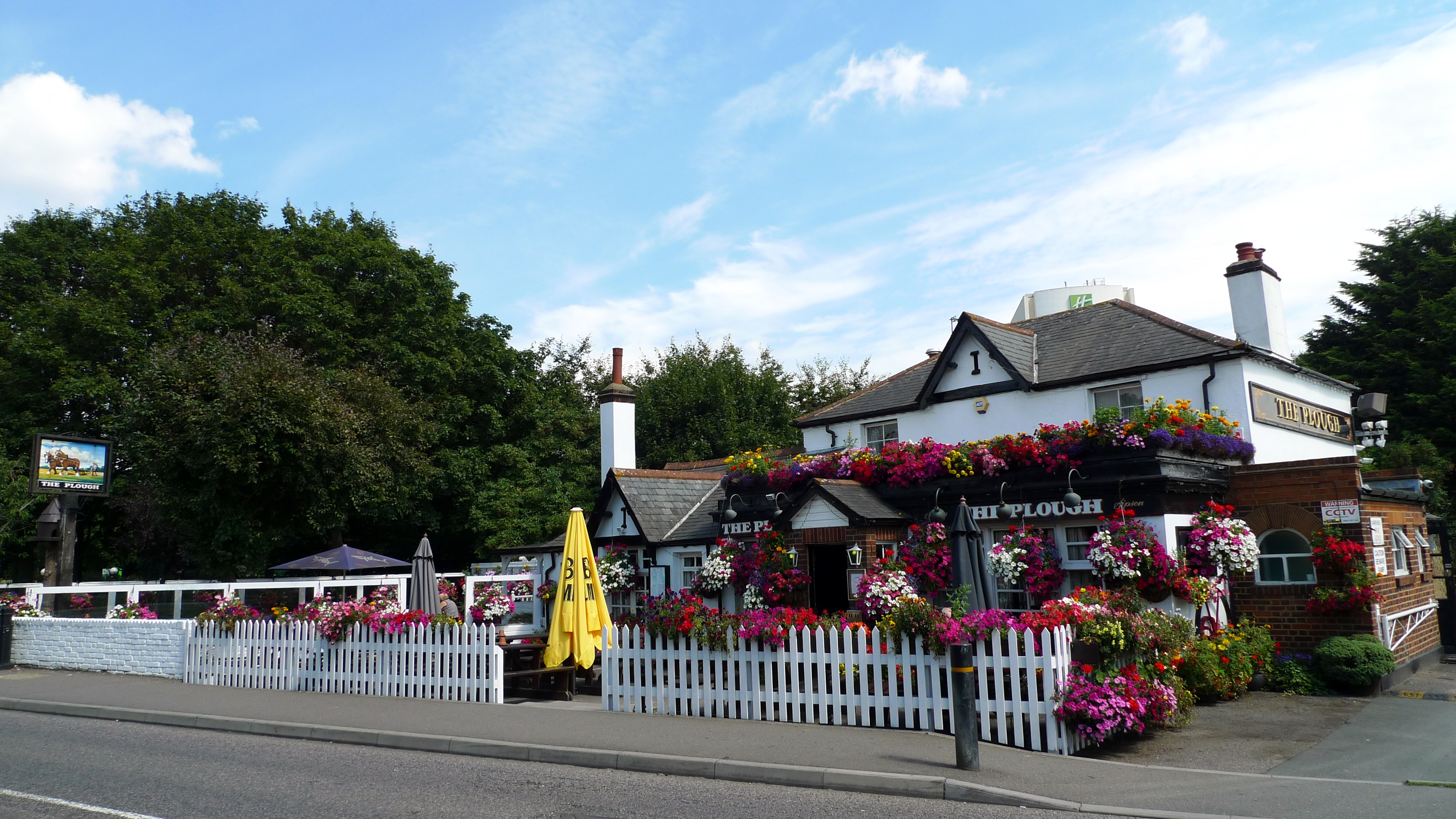
The Plough public house

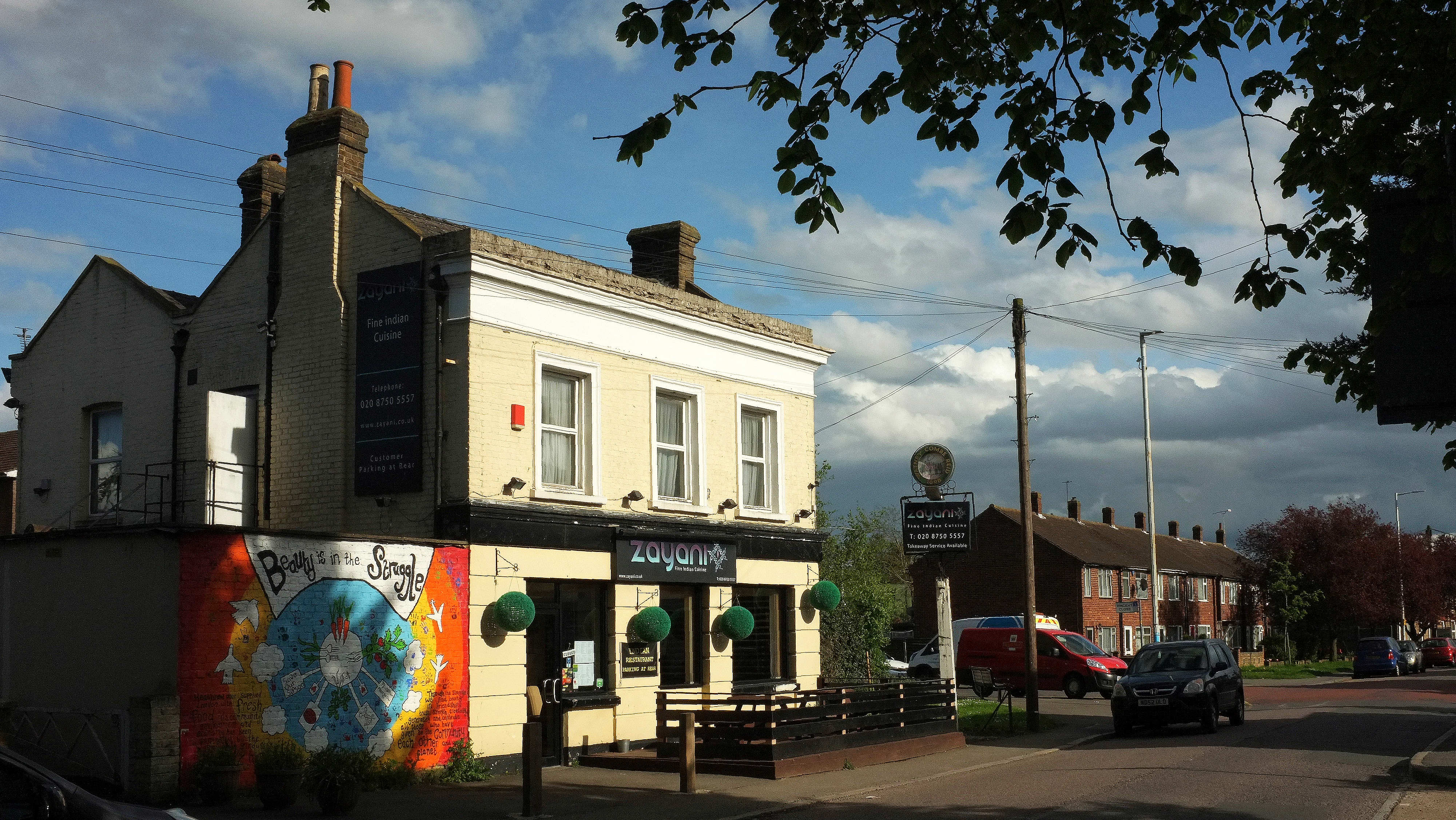
Zayani Indian restaurant, formerly The Crown public house

==== Sipson Farm ====
Sipson Farm was in the northeast angle of the Sipson crossroads, and was the biggest farm in the area. It had a large area of greenhouses, and 500 acres of land in Harmondsworth, Sipson, Harlington and Heathrow. In 1900 it had a substantial fruit orchard.

- 1819: Enclosure of Harmondsworth parish
  - And see Heathrow (hamlet)#19th century.
- 1842: Thomas Wild was born.
- Late 19th century: Sipson Farm was run by Thomas Wild & Son.
- 1898: Thomas Wild took on Rowland Richard Robbins as junior partner and the firm became Wild & Robbins.
- 1900 to 1948: Robbins lived in a house called Hollycroft, where Hollycroft Close is now.
- c.1910: Wild and Robbins gave some land in Sipson, for tennis courts and a children's playground.
- 1932: Thomas Wild died and was succeeded by his son, Thomas Wild the younger.
- 6 April 1938: Wild & Robbins was wound up "for reconstruction".
- 1944. The Heathrow Airport scheme started. Sipson Farm lost all or most of its land that was south of the Bath Road.
- 31 March 1949: Robbins left the partnership by mutual agreement, but the firm's name remained Wild & Robbins. Sipson Farm was now run by Thomas Wild and his son Thomas Wild III.
- 1965: The M4 motorway was opened past Sipson. Its course and the Heathrow Airport slip road and its junction took much of Sipson Farm's remaining land. After this, the farm struggled to keep running.
- 1970: Sipson Farm shut down. Some of its remaining land was left to fall back to wild overgrown vegetation.
- Early 1980s: The farm buildings were demolished and replaced by a residential road, Russell Gardens. The entry to the farm became the entry to 335 Sipson Road.
- 23 December 1987: It was agreed that Sipson Farm Estates Ltd. should be wound up.

==== Wall Garden Farm ====
Wall Garden Farm is a little east of the Sipson crossroads, north of the road to Harlington. It was orchard land, surrounded and divided by high walls to keep winds and frost (and fruit thieves) off.

- Early 1900s: See Heathrow (hamlet)#20th century for events involving Jonathan Smith. Jonathan Smith went bankrupt and moved from Heathrow Hall to Wall Garden Farm. Later he came to an arrangement with his creditors and the bankruptcy was discharged. He set up a jam factory to use the abundant fruit grown in the area. His son Frederick ran the jam factory after him. Kenwood Close (a street in Sipson) is where the jam factory was.
- 1970: By now most of Wall Garden Farm's trees had been grubbed out.
- 2004: Wall Garden Farm was being used for off-airport car parking for Heathrow Airport.

==== King William IV pub ====
The King William IV public house at the Sipson crossroads was built in the 16th century, and later altered, including a refronting in the 1930s. Originally a Wealden-type mediaeval hall house, it is a Grade II listed building.

==== Excavating gravel ====
Gravel companies own much land in Harmondsworth and Sipson and Harlington. They get planning permission to extract gravel and sand on condition that they restore the land for agriculture afterwards. Their land is used for growing wheat before and after gravel extracting.

=== Other history ===
- 1923: Sipson Way was made.

== Notable buildings ==
Name	Type	Built	Occupant/First use	Demolished?	Use of house or site now
The Vineries	large house	1880s	Thomas Wild (born 1842), then his son Thomas	1970	
Flats 1-12 Church Court, 228 Sipson Road (Sipson Baptist Church)	religious/civic	1891	Worship, prayer, social, education	no	mid-1980s converted into apartments
Inglenook	large domestic with adaptations	for Thomas Wild jr. when he married Elizabeth Rayner, then his son Thomas		no	a children's day nursery
Hollycroft	large house	18th century	1900-1948 R.R.Robbins	1960s	
Zayani Indian Restaurant (conversion of The Crown)	hospitality	mid-Victorian	hospitality	no	converted to restaurant
Sipson Court (approx. conversion of Sipson House)	big house	18th century	Wealthy family home	1970s except for façade	Rebuilt similarly as office block
Sipson Post Office & Stores; independent butcher	Post office, convenience shop	18th century with 19th century extensions, widening frontage	Owned by Francis family (1920s-2012)	No	Two units: Post Office/stationery/groceries; independent butchery
The King William IV	hospitality	17th century	hospitality	No	Pub

== Notable people ==
- Lionel Robbins (1898–1984), eminent economist, was born in Sipson
