= Mixed farming =

Economic activity

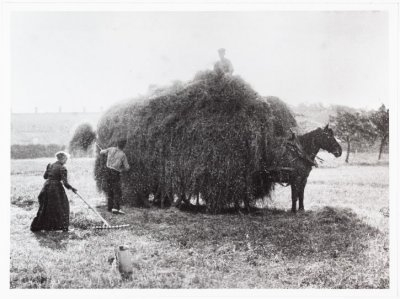
A hoogkar loaded with hay

Mixed farming is a type of farming which involves both the growing of crops and the raising of livestock. Such agriculture occurs across Asia and in countries such as India, Malaysia, Indonesia, Afghanistan, South Africa, China, Central Europe, Nordic countries, Canada, and Russia. Though at first it mainly served domestic consumption, countries such as the United States and Japan now use it for commercial purposes.

The cultivation of crops alongside the rearing of animals for meat or eggs or milk defines mixed farming. For example, a mixed farm may grow cereal crops, such as wheat or rye, and also keep cattle, sheep, pigs or poultry. Often the dung from the cattle serves to fertilize the crops. Also some of the crops might be used as fodder for the livestock. Before horses were commonly used for haulage, many young male cattle on such farms were often not butchered as surplus for meat but castrated and used as bullocks to haul the cart and the plough.

Agropastoralism is, according to Shikui Dong, "a set of practices that combine pastoral livelihoods with production of millet, sorghum, maize, vegetables, and pulses", wherein people receive most of their income from cultivation. It is most common in arid and semi-arid climates.

== More info ==
- Monoculture
- Working animal
- Cash crop
- Animal husbandry
- Fiber crop
- List of domesticated animals
- Energy crop
- Animal product
- Medicinal plant
- Animal–industrial complex
- Polyculture

== Sources ==
- Devendra, C.; Thomas, D. (2002). "Crop–animal interactions in mixed farming systems in Asia". Agricultural Systems. 71 (1–2): 27–40. Bibcode:2002AgSys..71...27D. doi:10.1016/S0308-521X(01)00034-8.
- Schiere, J. B.; Ibrahim, M. N. M.; Keulen, H. van (2002). "The role of livestock for sustainability in mixed farming: criteria and scenario studies under varying resource allocation". Agriculture, Ecosystems & Environment. 90 (2): 139–153. Bibcode:2002AgEE...90..139S. doi:10.1016/S0167-8809(01)00176-1.
