= South Middlesex Hospital =

- North West Thames Regional Health Authority
- Location within Hounslow

Geography
- Location: Isleworth, London, England, United Kingdom
- Coordinates: 51.4570°N 0.3379°W

Organisation
- Care system: NHS England

History
- Founded: 1898
- Closed: 1991

Links
- Lists: Hospitals in England

The South Middlesex Hospital was a hospital in Isleworth, London. Opened by the Duke of Cambridge as the Mogden Isolation Hospital in July 1898, it served its own borough and that of Richmond, retaining its name until 1938 when it was then renamed South Middlesex Fever Hospital but continued under local authority control.

When the National Health Service was formed it became, in 1948, simply 'South Middlesex Hospital' – still dealing with acute and infectious diseases under the North West Metropolitan Regional Hospital Board. Then from 1974 until its closure in 1991 it was administered by the North West Thames Regional Health Authority. The hospital has been demolished and the site is now occupied by a Tesco superstore.
