= Duke of Northumberland's River =

Artificial watercourse in London, England

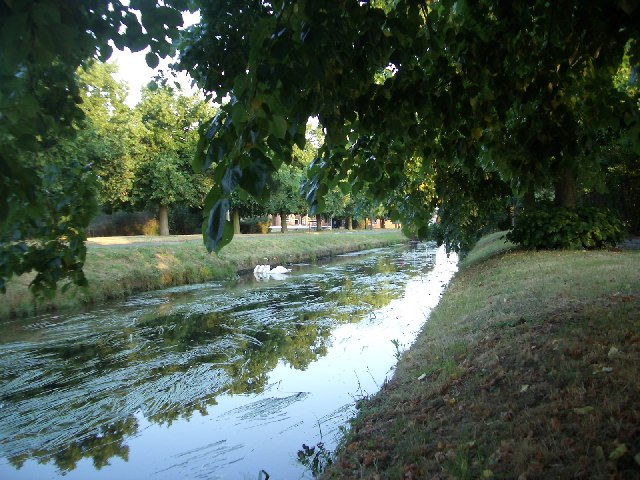
Stretch of the river at Twickenham

The Duke of Northumberland's River or D. O. N. River consists of separate upper and lower artificial watercourses in west London, United Kingdom. The older name Isleworth Mill Stream/River more accurately describes the economic motivation behind its construction. The first section draws water via a sluice from the Colne — a source river which has seven distributaries, many of which are man-made — today an extended distance (to bypass Heathrow Airport) of about 5 miles (8 km) into the Crane; its lower section of about 1.8 miles (2.9 km) draws water from that small river in Whitton, Twickenham, and discharges it via neighbouring Isleworth, passing Mill Plat into the tidal Thames. A sluice underneath Mill Plat feeds the main lake in Syon Park.

== Western section ==
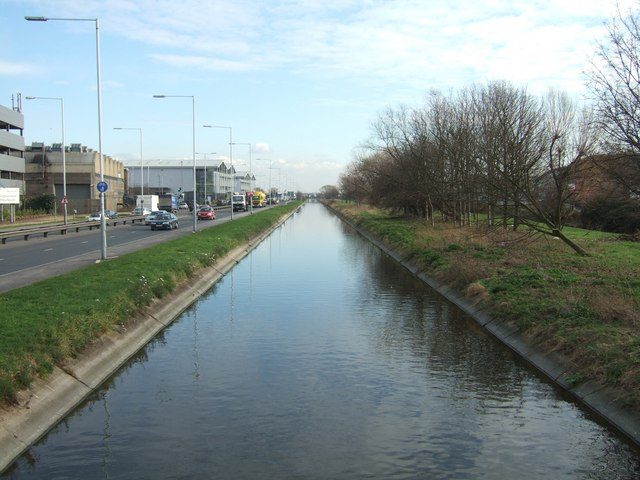
The river near Heathrow Airport

The western section was constructed during the reign of King Henry VIII of England to augment the flow supplying existing mills and to supply new mills, a source of revenue for the Duke of Northumberland's estate with the further benefit of irrigation for his tenants' fields. Most of the local topsoil was quite thin, on fast-draining gravel. The dukes and their Somerset-styled forebears were lords of the manor of Isleworth (1547–1554 and from 1594) (Note: The abolition of copyhold by the Law of Property Act 1925 meant the de facto abolition of pecuniary manorial rights) and Twickenham (1538–1541), retaining much of the dwindling agricultural land until the 20th century. The family cemented its foothold in Isleworth by acquiring and rebuilding a former grandiose monastery by the Thames there, which had become Syon House in 1594; it remains the family's home in southern England.

In 1530, a record lists an increase, probably temporary, of 42 labourers working on a new river cut from Longford (probably the Duke of Northumberland's River).

This section diverts a small proportion of water from the River Colne at Longford, south then eastwards to the River Crane. The shallow canal flows through the north of Stanwell, Bedfont and Feltham. For a large part of its early course, it flows alongside its younger "twin", the Longford River. The first part helped to irrigate fields and orchards of Longford, then those of Heathrow and Stanwell. It was diverted west and then south in 1944 when Heathrow Airport was built. Both minor "canals" were moved further under the building scheme for Heathrow Terminal 5. They skirt the western and southern perimeter of Heathrow Airport then diverge after The Two Bridges, on Hatton Road in Bedfont.

The river continues east to join the Crane in patchy woodland known as Donkey Wood, by Baber Bridge at the west end of Hounslow Heath. 51.4596°N 0.4022°W

== Eastern section ==
This section diverts water from the Crane in Kneller Gardens, Whitton, Twickenham, eastward then northward past The Stoop and Twickenham Stadium rugby stadiums, through Isleworth (originally to its mill), then onwards to supply the ornamental ponds in the Duke of Northumberland's estate at Syon Park. Further sluices here control the flow into the park and the River Thames at Isleworth Ait.

This part is the older — it was built in the time of Syon Abbey, over 100 years before it was inherited, in 1594, by wife of the "wizard earl", Henry Percy, 9th Earl of Northumberland, Dorothy (née Devereux) which automatically became his own as this inheritance preceded the Married Women's Property Act 1870.

The Duke of Northumberland's River can thus be described as a distributary of the Colne and a tributary of the Crane; it is also a distributary of the Crane and a tributary of the Thames. 51°27′21″N 0°20′39″W

It seems that the Crane was little more effective than the Bourne [inchoate, natural final part of the Duke of Northumberland's River] in driving a mill, for the new mill between Isleworth and Twickenham is not referred to again, and by 1543 yet another mill (later known as the Isleworth Manor Mill or Kidd's Mill) was being built at the old position near the mouth of the Bourne, while the Bourne was reinforced by a new river specially built across Hounslow Heath from the Colne. (fn. 15) The new mill remained an appurtenance of Isleworth manor until 1876. (fn. 16) It had two mill-stones in 1553, (fn. 17) and five in 1633, of which four ground corn and the fifth ground wood for dyes. It had only the four corn-grinding wheels in 1669, when it was to be rebuilt by the lessee. (fn. 18) By 1845 there were two steam-engines to assist the water-power and the mill was said to be one of the largest for flour in England. (fn. 19) The lessee was then Richard Kidd. After some variations in the firm's name, Samuel Kidd & Co. Ltd. were the owners when the mill stopped work a little while before it was demolished in 1941.

— Susan Reynolds, 1962

== See also ==
- Tributaries of the River Thames
- List of rivers in England

== Notes ==
Next confluence upstream	River Thames	Next confluence downstream
River Crane (north)	Duke of Northumberland's River	River Brent (north)
