= Crane =

Crane or cranes may refer to:

== Common meanings ==
- Crane (bird), a large, long-necked bird
- Crane (machine), industrial machinery for lifting
  - Crane (rail), a crane suited for use on railroads

== People and fictional characters ==
- Crane (surname), including a list of people and fictional characters with the surname
- Crane (given name), a list of people

== Places ==
=== Barbados ===
- The Crane, Barbados, a resort hotel

=== United Kingdom ===
- River Crane, Dorset
- River Crane, London, a small river of London, branch to the Thames
  - Crane (ward), a former electoral ward of Hillingdon London Borough Council that existed from 1978 to 2002

=== United States ===
- Crane, Indiana, a town
- Crane, Missouri, a town
- Crane, Montana, a census-designated place and unincorporated community
- Crane, Oregon, a census-designated place and unincorporated community
- Crane County, Texas
  - Crane, Texas, a city and the county seat
- Crane, Washington, an unincorporated community
- Crane Creek (disambiguation)
- Crane Estate, Ipswich, Massachusetts, consisting of:
  - Castle Hill
  - Crane Beach
- Crane Island (Washington), one of the San Juan Islands
- Crane Mountain, Oregon
- Camp Crane, a World War I United States Army Ambulance Service training camp located in Allentown, Pennsylvania

== Businesses ==
- Crane (St. Paul's Churchyard), a historical bookseller in London
- Crane & Co., a supplier of paper for US banknotes
- Crane Co., an American industrial products company
- Crane Bank, a commercial bank in Uganda.
- Crane Merchandising Systems, a vending machine manufacturer
- Crane Plumbing, a brand of plumbing fixtures made by American Standard Brands
- Crane-Simplex, an American car manufacturer, formerly named Crane Motor Car Company
- The Crane Group Companies, an American construction and materials company
- Cranes (restaurant), an American restaurant

== Arts and entertainment ==
- The Crane, a 1992 short film starring Jude Law
- Crane (TV series), a British TV series starring Patrick Allen, which ran from 1963 to 1965
- Cranes (band), a British alternative rock band
- Cranes (1969 song), Soviet anti-war song
- Cranes (2017 song), Ukrainian song by The Hardkiss
- Zhuravli ("Cranes"), a famous 1969 Russian song about World War II
- Orizuru, a classic Japanese origami sculpture in the shape of a crane

== Martial arts ==
- Fujian White Crane, a southern Chinese martial art
- Tibetan White Crane, a western/southern Chinese martial art
- Crane kick

== Schools in the United States ==
- Crane School of Music, part of the State University of New York (SUNY) at Potsdam, New York
- Crane Theological School, Medford, Massachusetts, a former seminary of Tufts University
- Crane High School (disambiguation)

== Ships ==
- USFS Crane, a United States Bureau of Fisheries fishery patrol vessel in commission from 1928 to 1940 which also served from 1940 to 1960 in the fleet of the United States Fish and Wildlife Service as US FWS Crane
- USS Crane (DD-109), a United States Navy Wickes-class destroyer in commission from 1919 to 1922 and from 1939 to 1945
- USS Crane Ship No. 1, the name from 1941 to 1955 of a United States Navy crane ship which formerly served as the battleship USS Kearsarge (BB-5)

== Other uses ==
- Cranē, a nymph named by Ovid, identified with the goddess Carna
- Cessna Crane, a British name for the United States built Cessna AT-17 Bobcat training aircraft
- Crane baronets, two extinct titles in the Baronetage of England
- Crane Melon, an heirloom melon
- Naval Surface Warfare Center Crane Division

== See also ==
- Crane shot, a shot taken with a camera mounted on a crane in motion pictures
- Crane fly
- Crain (disambiguation)
