= Tennessee House of Representatives 79th district =

State legislative district in Tennessee

Tennessee's 79th State House of Representatives district
- Map of Tennessee House districts with the 79th District shaded in red
Representative
Brock Martin; R–Huntingdon
since 2023
- Demographics: 78.4% White; 12.3% Black; 3.3% Hispanic; 0.3% Asian; 5.4% Multiracial
- Population (2024): 66,817

The Tennessee House of Representatives 79th district is one of the 99 legislative districts in the lower house of the Tennessee General Assembly. The district is located in West Tennessee and covers parts of Carroll, Gibson, and Henderson counties. The district includes Huntingdon, Milan, Trenton, and Lexington. Brock Martin has represented the district since 2023.

== Demographics ==
The Tennessee Comptroller estimates the population as of 2024 at 66,817.

- 78.4% of the district is White
- 12.3% of the district is Black
- 3.3% of the district is Hispanic
- 0.3% of the district is Asian
- 0.1% of the district is some other race alone
- 5.4% of the district is Two or more races

Detailed demographic information is also available through Census Reporter.

== History ==
The 88th Tennessee General Assembly was the first in which all districts were numbered. At this time, the 79th district was in Shelby County. From the 89th-92nd GAs it was in Haywood, and Lauderdale counties. From the 93rd-98th GAs, it was in Gibson County. From the 99th-112th, it was in Gibson and Carroll counties. Since the 113th General Assembly, it has been composed of parts of Carroll, Gibson, and Henderson counties.

== List of Representatives ==
Representative	Party	Years of Service	General Assembly	Hometown
Brock Martin	Republican	2023-present	113th-114th	Huntingdom
Curtis Halford	Republican	2009-2022	106th-112th	Dyer
Chris Crider	Republican	2003-2008	103rd-105th	Milan
Paul Phelan	Democratic	1993-2002	98th-102nd	Dresden
Floyd Crain	Democratic	1983-1992	93rd-97th	Milan
C. Ray Davis	Democratic	1979-1982	91st-92nd	Ripley
Jimmy Bishop	Democratic	1975-1978	89th-90th	Brownsville
Elbert Gill	Democratic	1967-1974	85th-88th	Memphis
