= Parks and open spaces in the London Borough of Hounslow =

The London Borough of Hounslow is a peripheral London borough in the south-west of the conurbation; as such part of the Metropolitan Green Belt lies within its boundaries. It has one of London's largest Nature reserves as well as many smaller gardens and sports grounds. The major areas are:

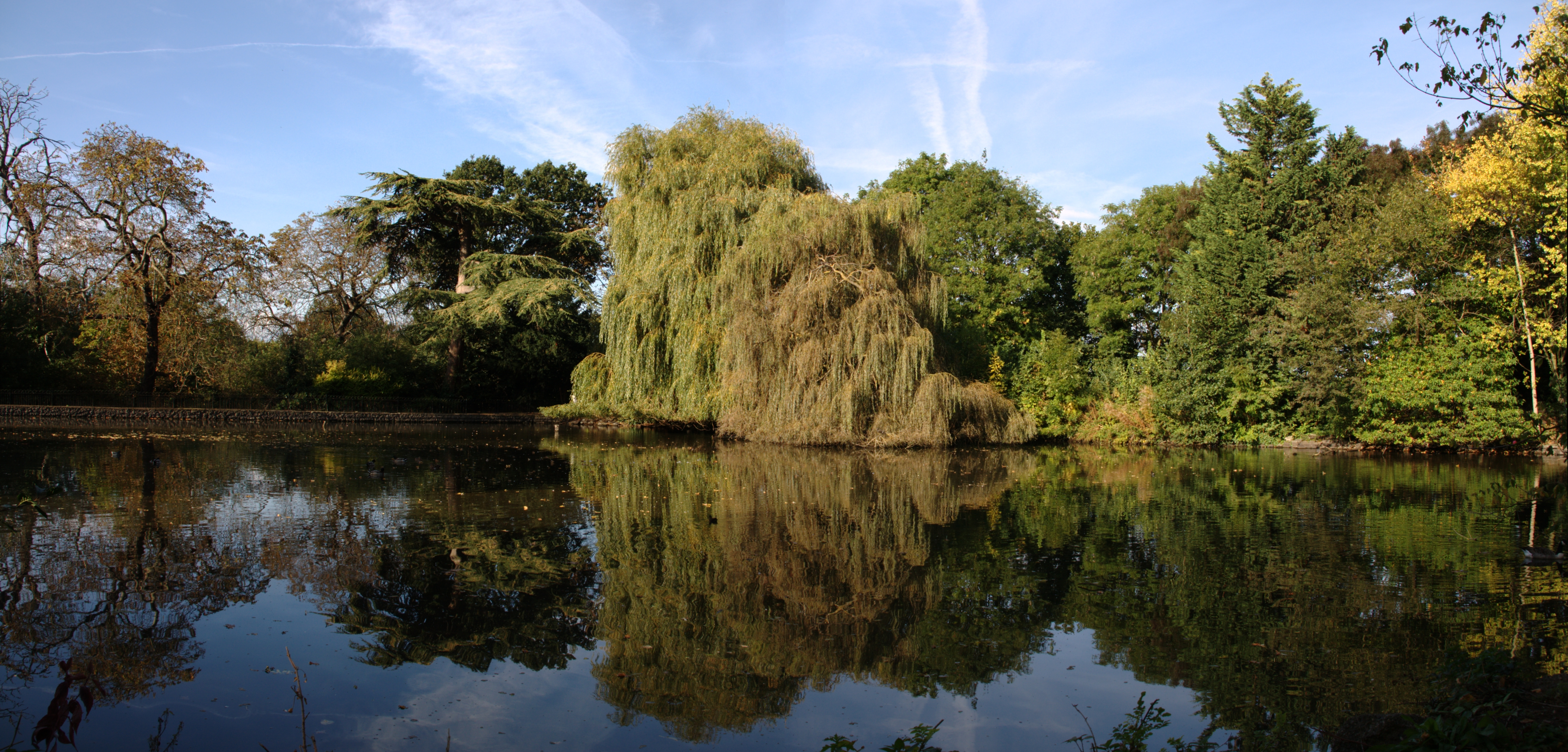
The ornamental lake in Boston Manor Park

- Bedfont Lakes Country Park, near Heathrow Airport: created 1995
- Blenheim Park, Feltham
- Boston Manor Park & Nature Reserve, a historic park which includes the 17th century Boston Manor House. Purchased 1923 by Hounslow Council. It has an ornamental lake with waterfowl, 3 tennis courts, a modern well equipped children's play area and cafeteria. Open 8am till dusk.
- Carville Hall Park (North and South)
- Chiswick Common
- Chiswick House Grounds, historic landscape gardens
- Crane Park, 6 miles (10 km) linear riverside park
- Cranford Park
- Dukes Meadows, a riverside park in Chiswick, which includes a play area, sports clubs and a health and fitness centre.
- Feltham Park
- Gunnersbury Park Estate, which includes Gunnersbury Park House, now a museum
- Hanworth Park, or London Air Park, a former airfield converted into a green open space
- Hounslow Heath, a Local Nature Reserve
- Inwood Park, Hounslow
- Hounslow Urban Farm, a rare breeds centre and London's largest community farm
- Lampton Park, one of the largest green areas and public parks in West London
- Osterley Park, a National Trust property
- Redlees Park, Isleworth
- Syon House, residence of the Duke of Northumberland
- Turnham Green

== See also ==
- Hounslow
