= Crain (surname) =

Crain is a surname. Notable people with the surname include:

Rance Crain (born 1938) publisher, Crain Communications, Inc..

- Clayton Crain, comic book artist
- Dunham Jones Crain (1831–1908), New York politician and diplomat
- Floyd H. Crain (1929–2023), American politician
- Hartwell Crain (1900–1981), American politician
- Jeanne Crain (1925–2003), actress
- Jesse Crain (born 1981), baseball player
- John L. Crain, president of Southeastern Louisiana University
- Kurt Crain (1964–2012), American football player
- Lavi Crain (born 2010), American artistic gymnast
- Oleta Crain (1913–2007), African-American military officer, federal civil servant
- Robert Crain (1865–1928), American lawyer and farmer
- Samantha Crain (born 1986), American musician
- Thomas C. T. Crain (1860–1942), New York County D.A.
- William C. Crain (1798–1865), New York politician
- Willie Crain Jr. (born 1946), American convicted child killer and serial child rapist
