= Senator Crain =

Senator Crain may refer to:

- Brian Crain (born 1961), Oklahoma State Senate
- Hartwell Crain (1900–1981), Missouri State Senate
- William H. Crain (1848–1896), Texas State Senate
