= White Crane =

White Crane may refer to:

- Fujian White Crane, a southern Chinese martial art
- Siberian crane, a nearly all-white bird in the family Gruidae
- Tibetan White Crane, a western/southern Chinese martial art
- White Crane Journal, a quarterly magazine of gay spirituality, published for 81 issues from 1988–2010

== See also ==
- Crane (disambiguation)
- White (disambiguation)
