= Hounslow Heath Golf Centre =

Public golf course in west London

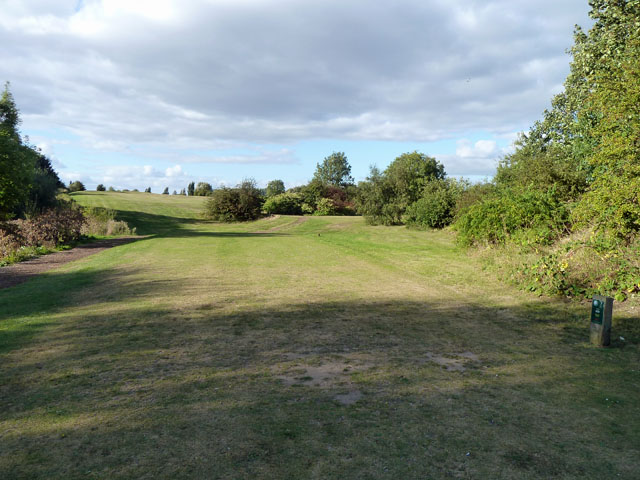
- Hounslow Heath Golf Course

- Hounslow Heath Golf Course
- 51°27′34.48″N 0°23′47.33″W

Club information
- Location: Feltham
- Type: public
- Owner: London Borough of Hounslow
- Tota holes: 18
- Website: http://www.hhgc.uk.com
- Designed by: Fraser Middleton
- Par: 69
- Length: 5,901 yards (5,396 m)

Hounslow Heath Golf Centre was a 117 acres (47 ha) public golf course and centre which comprised an 18-hole course located on Hounslow Heath in Feltham in the London Borough of Hounslow, west London. It was home to resident Hounslow Heath Golf Club.

== Location ==
The course was situated on the western side of the heath bordered to the west by Donkey Wood and the River Crane. Part of the course adjacent to the river is liable to flooding. Access is from the A315 Staines Road.

== History ==
After World War II gravel was extracted from the site and subsequently used for landfill until the late 1960s. The golf course was established in 1977. The course was designed by Fraser Middleton and opened in 1979. Operation of the course was leased to Parpost Ltd in 2005 and John Laing Integrated Services prior to that. Usage declined from 25,000 rounds of golf played in 2004 to below 10,000 in 2012, leading to a decision to sell. The golf course went on the market in April 2014 with planning permission to extend the clubhouse, develop a driving bay and potential to expand use of the site to include other leisure activities.

== Closure ==
The course was closed by Hounslow Borough Council on 30 September 2016. The number of rounds played had been declining for some time (see above), and the council was incurring high costs in subsidising the continued presence of golf at the site .

The site has now been redeveloped to provide a re-modelled 9-hole pitch-and-putt golf course with new clubhouse, multi-level driving range, two 18-hole adventure golf courses, and a children’s adventure park, the latter called Hobbledown Heath.

== Course ==
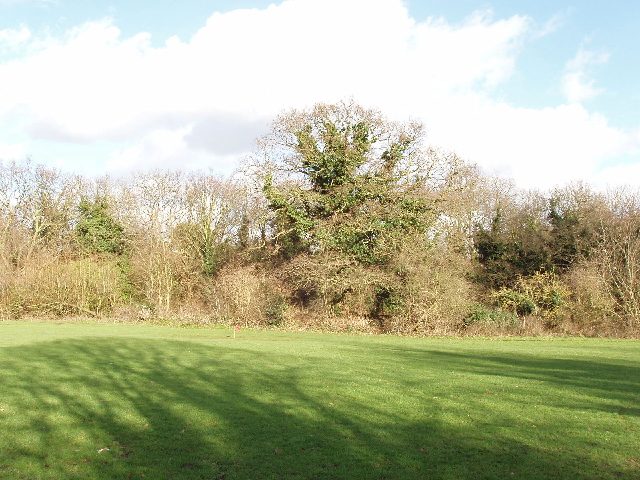
Hounslow Heath Golf Course

The course comprised eighteen holes in two loops of nine with four par 3, thirteen par 4 and one par 5. Holes 10–13 were located to the north of the A315 accessed via an underpass. The course and adjacent heath are designated Metropolitan Green Belt and a Local Nature Reserve and form part of the Hounslow Gravels Natural Landscape Area.

== Other facilities ==
The facilities included a Café, retail area, greenkeepers’ office and large car park. A small practice ground and a practice putting green were situated near to the clubhouse and first tee.
