= Crain =

Crain may refer to:

== People ==
- Crain (surname)

== Places ==
- Crain, Yonne, a commune in the region Bourgogne, France

== Other ==
- Crain (band), an indie rock band
- Crain Communications, an American publishing conglomerate
- Crain crain, the common name of the leafy vegetable Corchorus in Sierra Leone.

== See also ==
- Crane (disambiguation)
