= Hounslow Heath =

Nature reserve in London, England

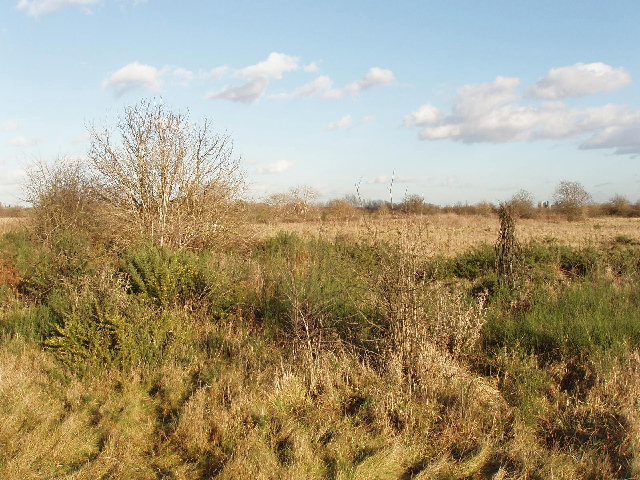

- Location within Greater London
- Location: Hounslow
- Nearest city: London
- OS grid: TQ1274
- Coordinates: 51°27′17″N 0°23′6″W
- Area: 82 hectares (200 acres)
- Operator: London Borough of Hounslow
- Status: open all year
- Hiking trails: Crane Valley Walk (London Loop)
- Habitats: Heathland
- Designation: Local Nature Reserve
- Parking: A315 Staines Road
- Public transit: Buses: 237, 116, 117, 235, 635; Hounslow West tube
- Website: www.hounslow.info/parks-open-spaces/find-your-park/hounslow-heath/

Hounslow Heath is a local nature reserve in the London Borough of Hounslow and at a point borders Richmond upon Thames. The public open space, which covers 200 acres (80 ha), is all that remains of the historic Hounslow Heath which covered more than 4,000 acres (1,600 ha). The present day area is bounded by A315 Staines Road, A3063 Wellington Road South, A314 Hanworth Road, and the River Crane.

== History ==
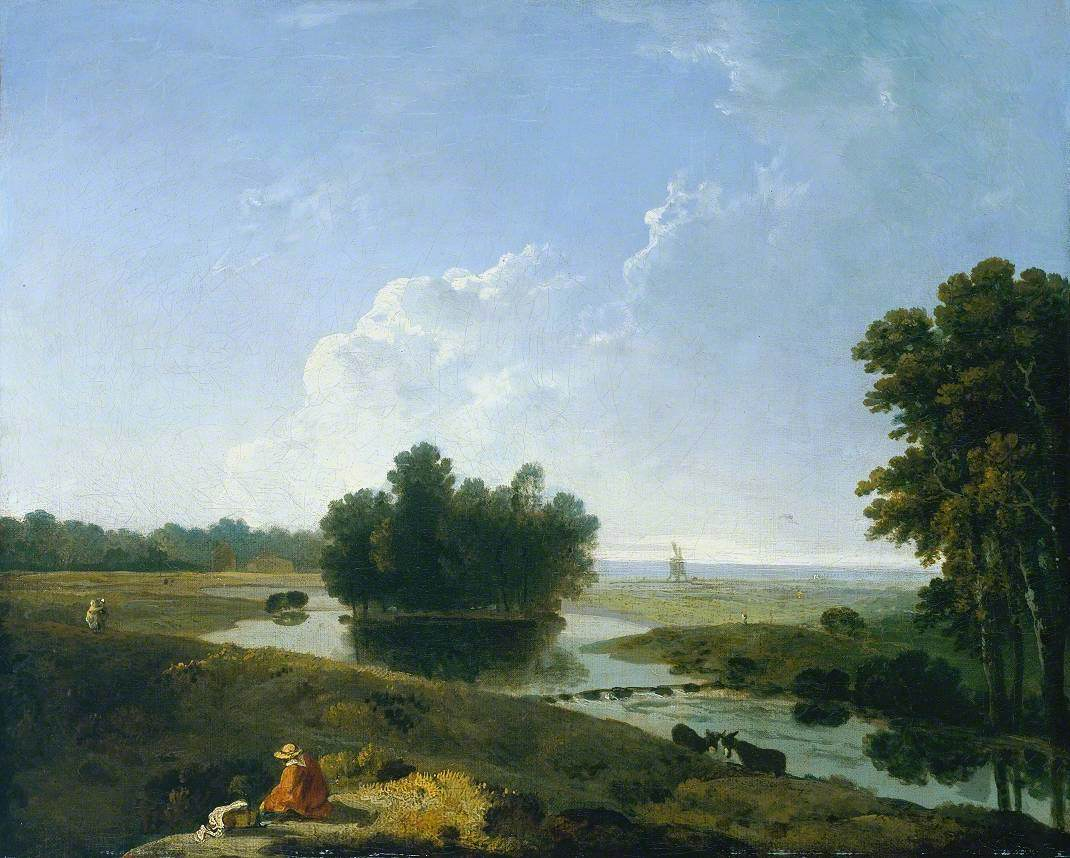
On Hounslow Heath by Richard Wilson, 1770

The heathland of Hounslow Heath originally covered an area underlain by Taplow gravel that now includes parts of Bedfont, Brentford, Cranford, Feltham, Hampton, Fulwell, Hanworth, Harlington, Harmondsworth, Heston, Hounslow, Isleworth, Stanwell, Teddington, Twickenham, and Heathrow.

Hounslow Heath has had major historical importance, originally crossed by main routes from London to the west and southwest of Britain. Staines Road, the northern boundary of the present heath, was the Roman Road, Via Trinobantes. There are several historic references to Roman camps on or close to the heath. Continuous recorded history dates back to Norman times. In 1546, Hounslow Heath was surveyed with a recorded area of 4,293 acres (1,737 ha) (6.71 square miles).

Various armies used the heath due to its proximity to London, Windsor and Hampton Court. Oliver Cromwell stationed an army there at the end of the English Civil War in 1647. James II camped his army there, and conducted military exercises and mock battles to try to intimidate the population in London. In 1793, Hounslow Barracks was built to the north of Staines Road as part of the preparations to meet a possible French invasion. In the 17th and 18th centuries, the heath was notorious as the haunt of highwaymen and footpads, being crossed by the Great West Road and the Bath Road.

The eventual mapping of the whole of the United Kingdom by the Ordnance Survey began with the measuring of an accurate base-line on Hounslow Heath, chosen for its flatness and its relative proximity to the Royal Greenwich Observatory. A sighting was made of the spire of All Saints' church in Banstead, and along that line a length of 27,400 feet was very precisely measured. This work by General William Roy was the start of the Anglo-French Survey (1784–1790), which led to the Principal Triangulation of Great Britain.

By 1900, the heath was still in use as a training ground for horse-mounted cavalry based at Hounslow Barracks, a gun shooting range, and adjacent army medical units including an isolation hospital. After the outbreak of World War I in 1914, Hounslow Heath Aerodrome was established, that developed to become a fighter aircraft defence and training base. In 1919, the aerodrome became the sole London Terminal Aerodrome, and hosted the first scheduled daily international commercial air services. In 1920, it surrendered its role to Croydon Airport, and closed. The heath was then again used for military training and a repair depot.

On the south side of Staines Road, to the north of the Heath, is a monument, now in a state of neglect, commemorating the first flight to Australia, a modified Vickers Vimy bomber G-EAOU, flown by Australian brothers Keith and Ross Smith, which took off from Hounslow Heath Aerodrome on 12 November 1919 and arrived in Darwin on 10 December. A plaque marks the entrance to London's first civil airport, stating: "London Terminal Aerodrome Hounslow Heath August 1919 - 1920. From here the first British international airline operation and the first flight from Europe to Australia was made. Erected by the Heston and Isleworth Borough Council". On 10 April 2016, another memorial to the aerodrome was unveiled and dedicated by the Airfields of Britain Conservation Trust immediately south of the car park beside the Staines Road.

An area to the west of the present heath was used for gravel extraction after World War II. Used for landfill until the late 1960s, the land was reclaimed to form Hounslow Heath Golf Centre which opened in 1979.

== Archaeology ==
Bronze Age spearheads, axes, and sword and knife fragments from Hounslow, are held at the British Museum, also Celtic badges and amulets discovered in a field at Hounslow in 1864. In 1999, excavations on the former Feltham Marshalling Yards to the south of the heath unearthed remains of an Iron Age furnace and post holes from a round house. There are various remains of former mills and other industrial archaeological features adjoining the River Crane near the heath. This part of the river is classified as an Archaeological Priority Area.

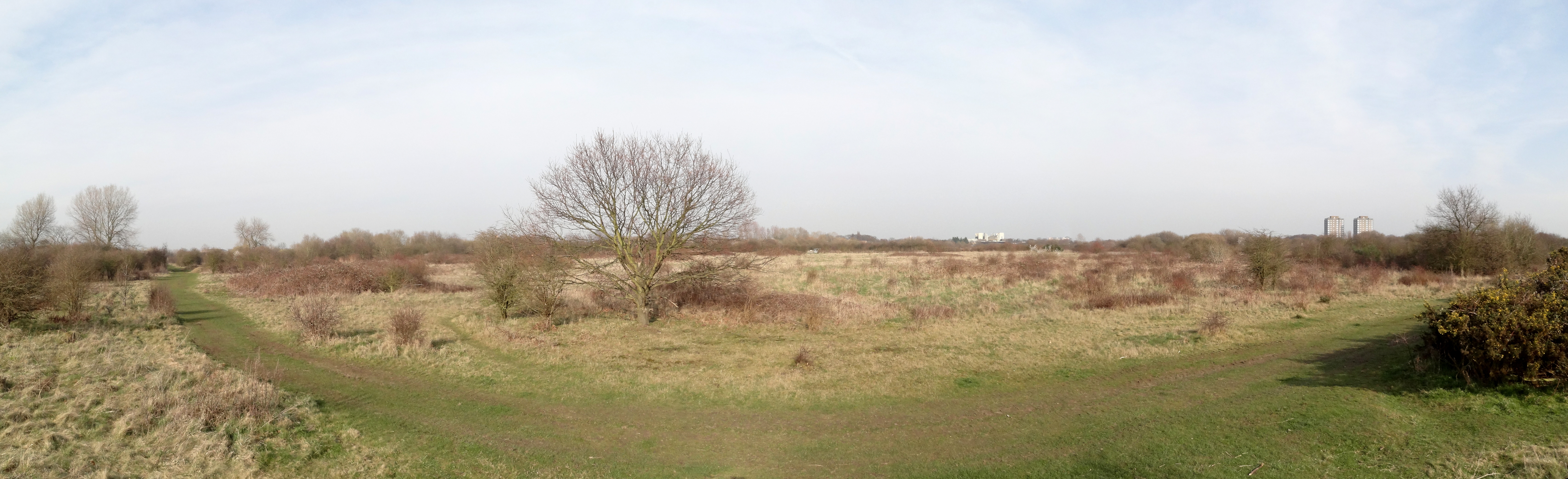
Hounslow Heath, West London.

== Nature reserve ==
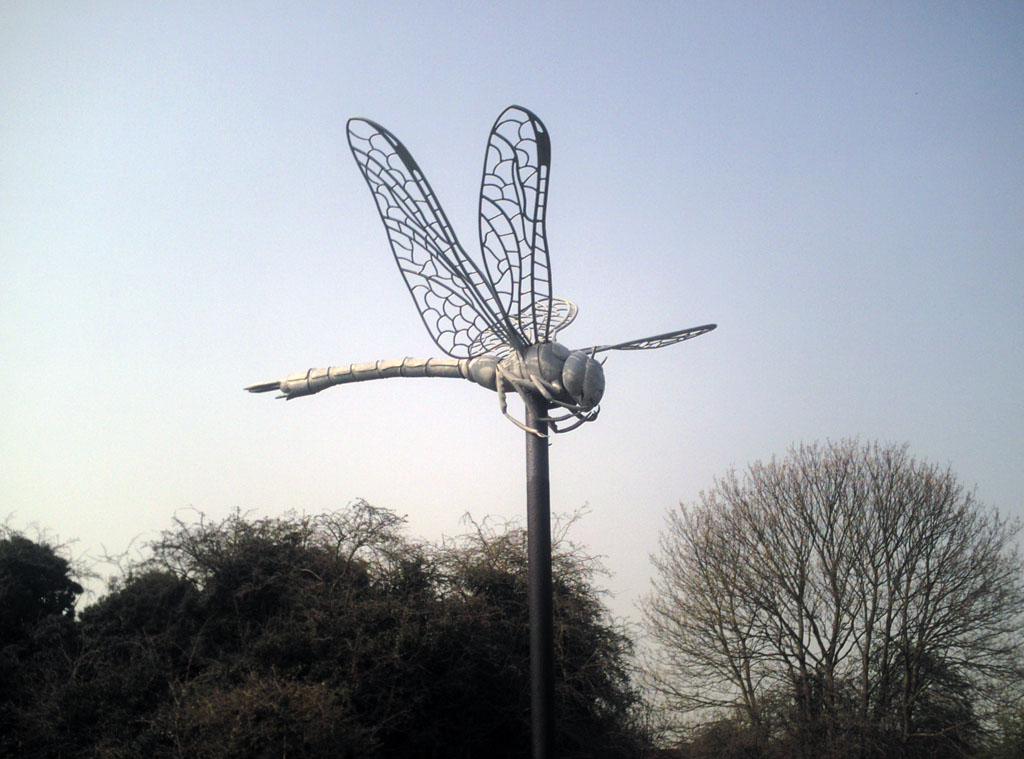
Dragonfly sculpture at Hounslow Heath, looking west, adjacent to the rangers' yard near the Staines Road main entrance

Hounslow Heath is a designated local nature reserve and Site of Metropolitan Importance for Nature Conservation, and is made up of lowland heath, dry acid grassland, woodland, scrub, neutral grasslands, wetlands, wildflower meadows, providing a wild, rugged country setting with a large network of paths.

== See also ==
- Hounslow parks and open spaces
- Murder of Patsy Morris, took place on the heath in 1980
