= Syon House =

House with park in West London, England

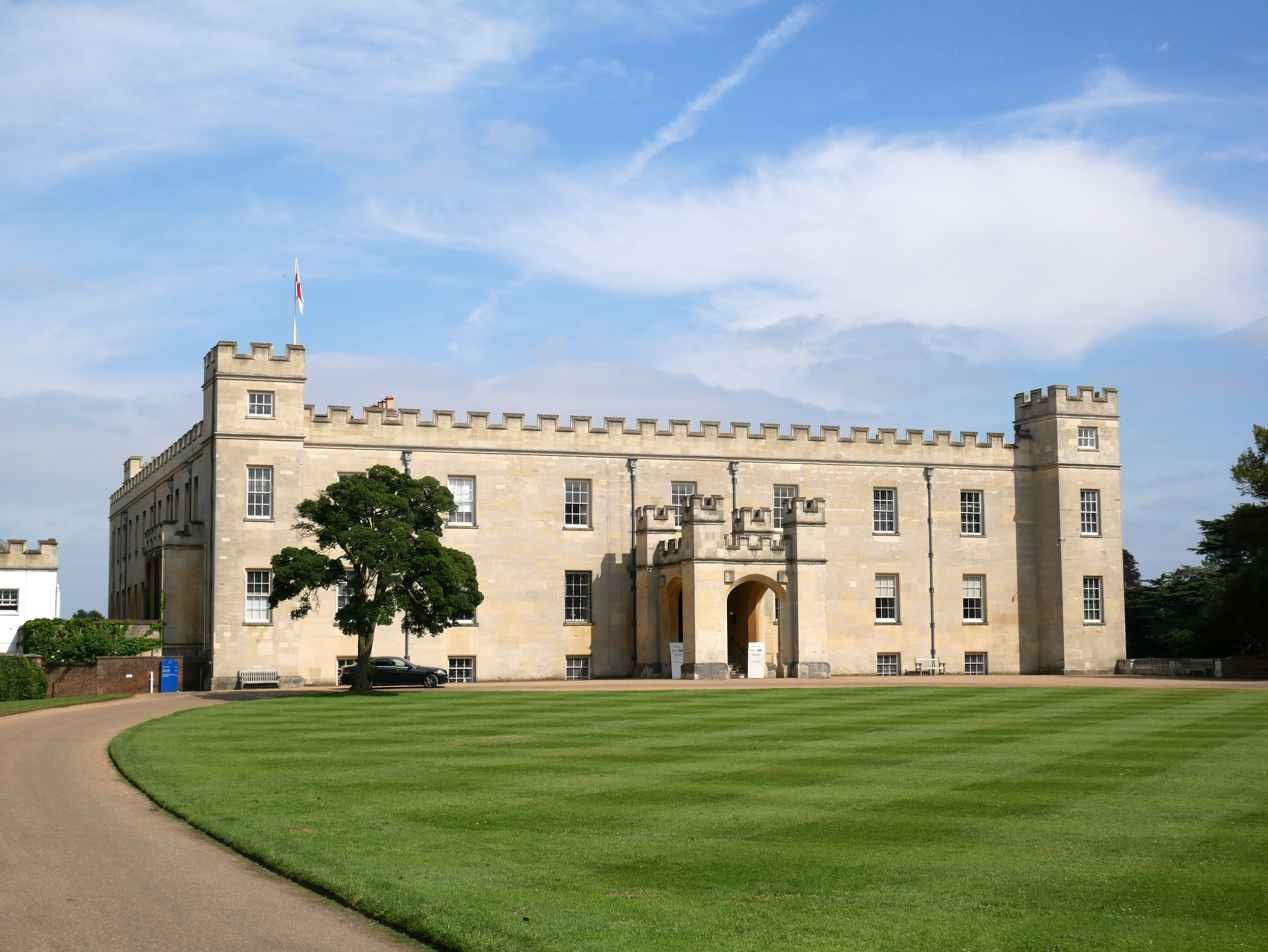
- Syon House in 2018

- Location within London Borough of Hounslow
- 51°28′36.31″N 0°18′41.53″W
- Type: Mansion
- Location: Syon Park
- OS grid reference: TQ 17282 76685

History
- Built: 1547–52
- Rebuilt: 1762-69

Site notes
- Area: London Borough of Hounslow
- Architect: Robert Adam
- Owner: Duke of Northumberland

Listed Building – Grade I
- Official name: Syon House
- Designated: 15 Jun 1951
- Reference no.: 1080318

National Register of Historic Parks and Gardens
- Official name: Syon Park
- Designated: 1 October 1987
- Reference no.: 1000148

Syon House /ˈsaɪən/ is the west London residence of the Duke of Northumberland. A Grade I listed building, it lies within the 200-acre (80 hectare) Syon Park, in the London Borough of Hounslow.

The family's traditional central London residence had been Northumberland House in Trafalgar Square, since demolished. The eclectic interior of Syon House was designed by the architect Robert Adam in the 1760s.

== History ==
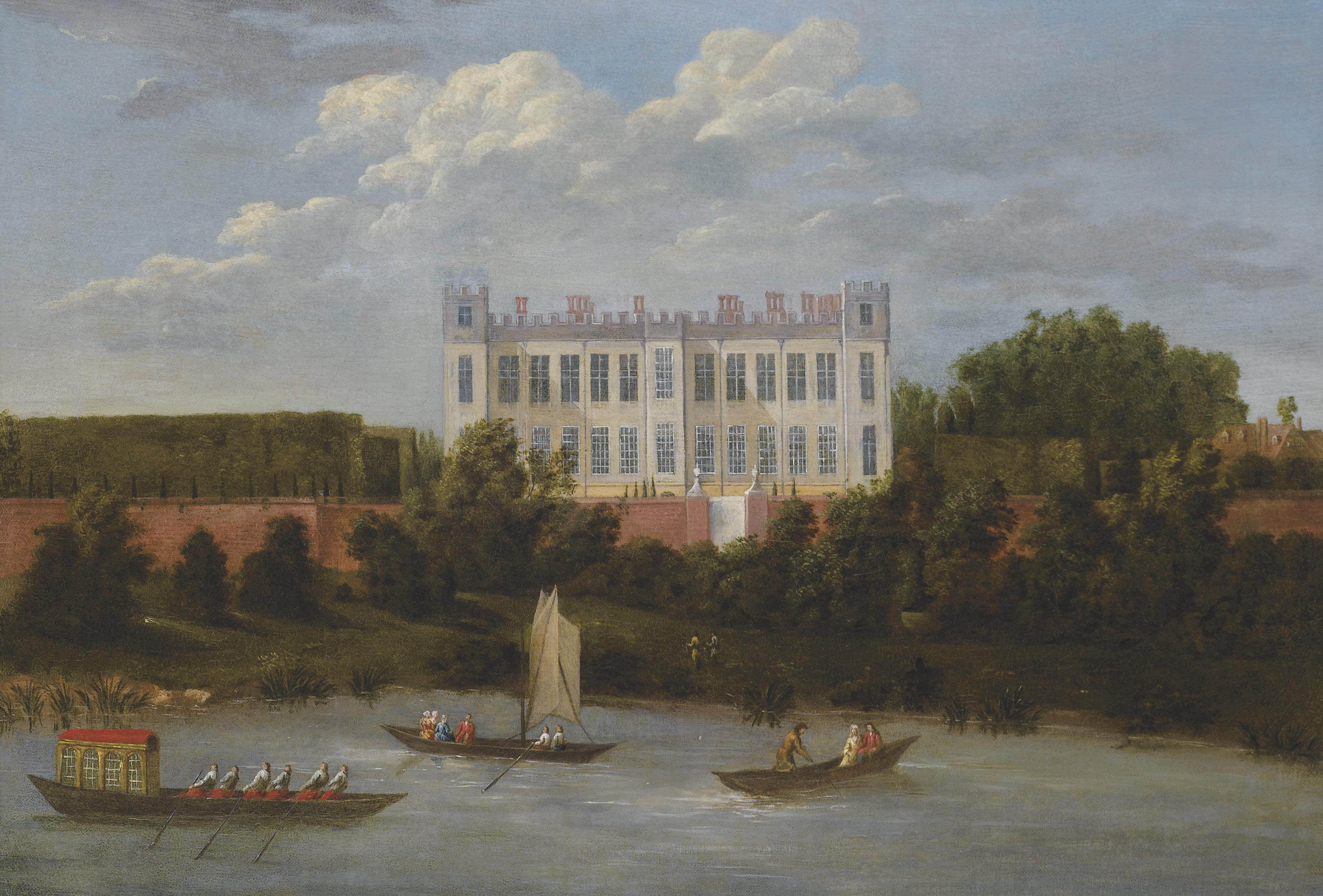
Syon House before the alterations of the 1760s

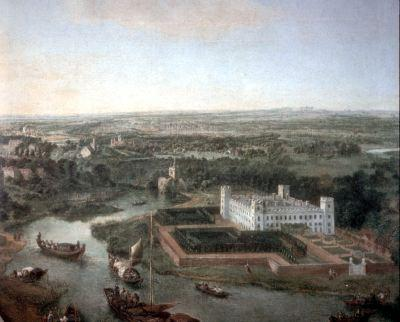
Idealised view of the house, All Saints’ Church, Isleworth and both banks of the River Thames at high water between 1700 and 1750 looking towards the south, before the construction of Richmond Bridge

Syon House derives its name from Syon Abbey, a medieval monastery of the Bridgettine Order, founded in 1415 on a nearby site by Henry V. The abbey moved to the site now occupied by Syon House in 1431. It was one of the wealthiest nunneries in the country. Unsubstantiated local folklore claims that the monks of Sheen had a secret tunnel running to the nunnery at Syon. In 1539, the abbey was closed by royal agents during the Dissolution of the Monasteries and the monastic community was expelled.

Upon the dissolution of the abbey, Syon became the property of the Crown for a short time before long lease to the 1st Duke of Somerset, who had the site rebuilt as Syon House in the Italian Renaissance style before his death in 1552. In November 1541 and through February 1542, Henry VIII's fifth wife, Catherine Howard, was imprisoned at Syon. In February 1542, the King's men took her to the Tower of London and executed her on charges of adultery. Five years later, when King Henry VIII died, his coffin, surmounted by a jewelled effigy, rested at Syon House for one night before the procession continued to his burial place in St George's Chapel, Windsor.

Lady Jane Grey received formal notification at Syon House on Sunday, 9 July 1553 that she was King Edward VI's heir to the throne. Jane was living at her parents' house of Sheen Priory nearby, and John Dudley sent his daughter Mary, Lady Sidney, to Sheen that morning to bring Jane to Syon. A delegation consisting of Dudley and members of the Privy Council together with their wives are said by tradition to have met with Jane in what is now the Long Gallery to officially convey the news to her.

In 1557, it was proposed to convert the new building to the earlier Catholic use but Elizabeth I acceded to the throne before this change was effected. Syon was acquired in 1594 by Henry Percy, 9th Earl of Northumberland (1564–1632) since when it has remained in his family.

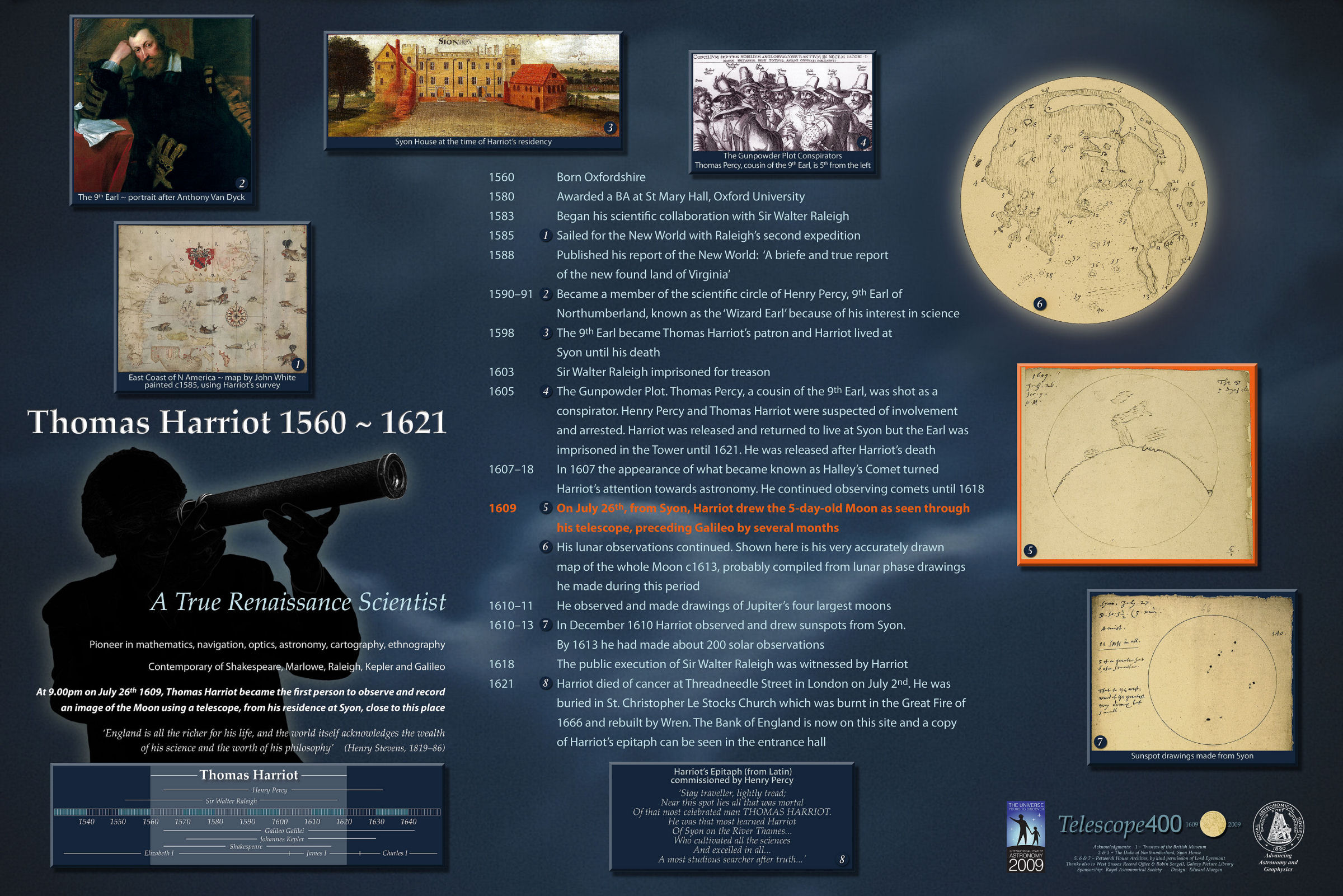
The Thomas Harriot Plaque in the grounds of Syon House (W. London).

In 1609, Thomas Harriot was working at Syon when he made the first ever use of the newly invented telescope to make astronomical drawings of the moon on 26 June, several months ahead of Galileo's observations. A plaque marking Harriot can be found in the grounds, not far from where the observations took place.

In the late 17th century, Syon was in the possession of Charles Seymour, 6th Duke of Somerset, through his wife, Elizabeth Seymour (née Percy). After the future Queen Anne had a disagreement with her sister, Mary II (wife of William III), over her friendship with Sarah Churchill, Countess of Marlborough, Queen Mary evicted Princess Anne from her court residence at Whitehall and Hampton Court. Princess Anne came to live at Syon with her close friends, the Somersets, in 1692. Anne gave birth to a stillborn child there. Shortly after the birth, Queen Mary came to visit her, again demanding that Anne dismiss the Countess of Marlborough and stormed out again when Anne flatly refused.

In the 18th century, Hugh Percy, 1st Duke of Northumberland, commissioned architect and interior designer Robert Adam and landscape designer Lancelot "Capability" Brown to redesign the house and estate. Work began on the interior reconstruction project in 1762. Five large rooms on the west, south and east sides of the House, were completed before work ceased in 1769. A central rotunda, which Adam had intended for the interior courtyard space, was not implemented, due to cost.

In 1951, Syon House was opened to the public for the first time under Hugh Percy, 10th Duke of Northumberland and his wife Elizabeth. Later, in 1995 under Ralph Percy, 12th Duke of Northumberland, the family rooms became open to the public as well. As the Percy family continues to live there, they continue to enhance the house. Most recently the Duchess added a new central courtyard with the design of Marchioness of Salisbury.

A £600K restoration was undertaken in late 2007, primarily involving work to the roof area. In 2008 restoration work commenced on the Great Hall and a current long-term project is to restore the Adam Rooms.

== Architecture ==
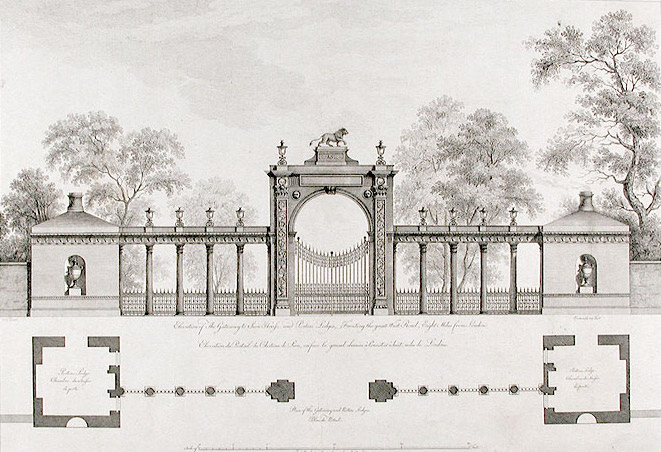
A design for a gateway and porters' lodges at Syon House by Robert Adam, c. 1769

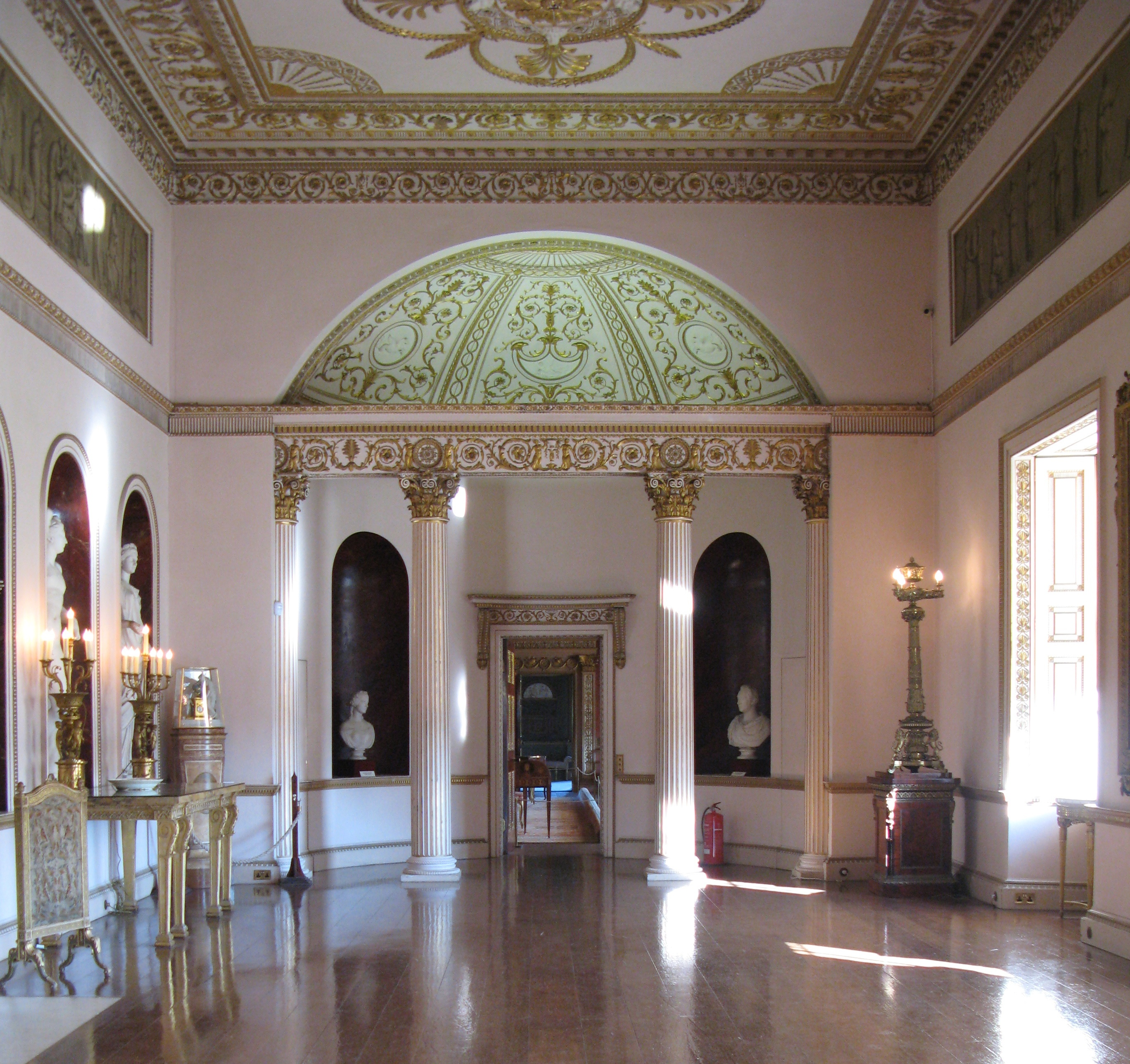
Grand Neoclassical interior by Adam

Syon House's exterior was erected in 1547 while under the ownership of the 1st Duke of Somerset. Syon's current interior was designed by Robert Adam in 1762 under the commission of the 1st Duke and Duchess of Northumberland.

The well known "Adam style" is said to have begun with Syon House. It was commissioned to be built in the Neo-classical style, which was fulfilled, but Adam's eclectic style doesn't end there. Syon is filled with multiple styles and inspirations including a huge influence of Roman antiquity, highly visible Romantic, Picturesque, Baroque and Mannerist styles and a dash of Gothic. There is also evidence in his decorative motifs of his influence by Pompeii that he received while studying in Italy. Adam's plan of Syon House included a complete set of rooms on the main floor, a domed rotunda with a circular inner colonnade meant for the main courtyard ('meant for' meaning that this rotunda was not built due to a lack of funds), five main rooms on the west, east and south side of the building, a pillared ante-room famous for its colour, a Great Hall, a grand staircase (though not built as grand as originally designed) and a Long Gallery stretching 136 feet long. Adam's most famous addition is the suite of state rooms and as such they remain exactly as they were built.

More specific to the interior of Adam's rooms is where the elaborate detail and colour shines through. Adam added detailed marble chimneypieces, shuttering doors and doorways in the Drawing Room, along with fluted columns with Corinthian capitals. The long gallery, which is about 14 feet high and 14 feet wide, contains many recesses and niches into the thick wall for books along with rich and light decoration and stucco-covered walls and ceiling. At the end of the gallery is a closet with a domed circle supported by eight columns; halfway through the columns is a doorway imitating a niche.

In the 1820s the north range of the house that was not completed by Adam was redesigned by Hugh Percy, 3rd Duke of Northumberland. At this time the house was also refaced in Bath stone and the porch rebuilt. This remodelling is thought to have been done by the architect Thomas Cady, who had worked on other estates belonging to the Percy family.

Syon House was refurbished again in the 1860s. Algernon Percy, 4th Duke of Northumberland had Renaissance-style plaster ceilings put into the Family Drawing Room, Family Dining Room and Print Room.

The final plan of Syon House includes an entrance hall, ante-room, State Dining Room, State Drawing Room, Long Gallery, study, sitting room, Print Room, Family Drawing Room, Family Dining Room, private apartments on the top floor for the family to live in and a grand staircase.

== Syon Park ==
Syon Park is a 200-acre (80 hectare) park bordering the Thames, looking across the river to Kew Gardens. Near its banks is a tidal meadow flooded twice a day by the river. It contains more than 200 species of rare trees. Although the park and lake were designed by Capability Brown in 1760, their character today is nineteenth century. The circular pool has a copy of Giambologna's Mercury. The park and the house in the background were painted from across the Thames by J. M. W. Turner c. 1802–1810 in the painting Zion House, Isleworth and in two capriccios in 1805.

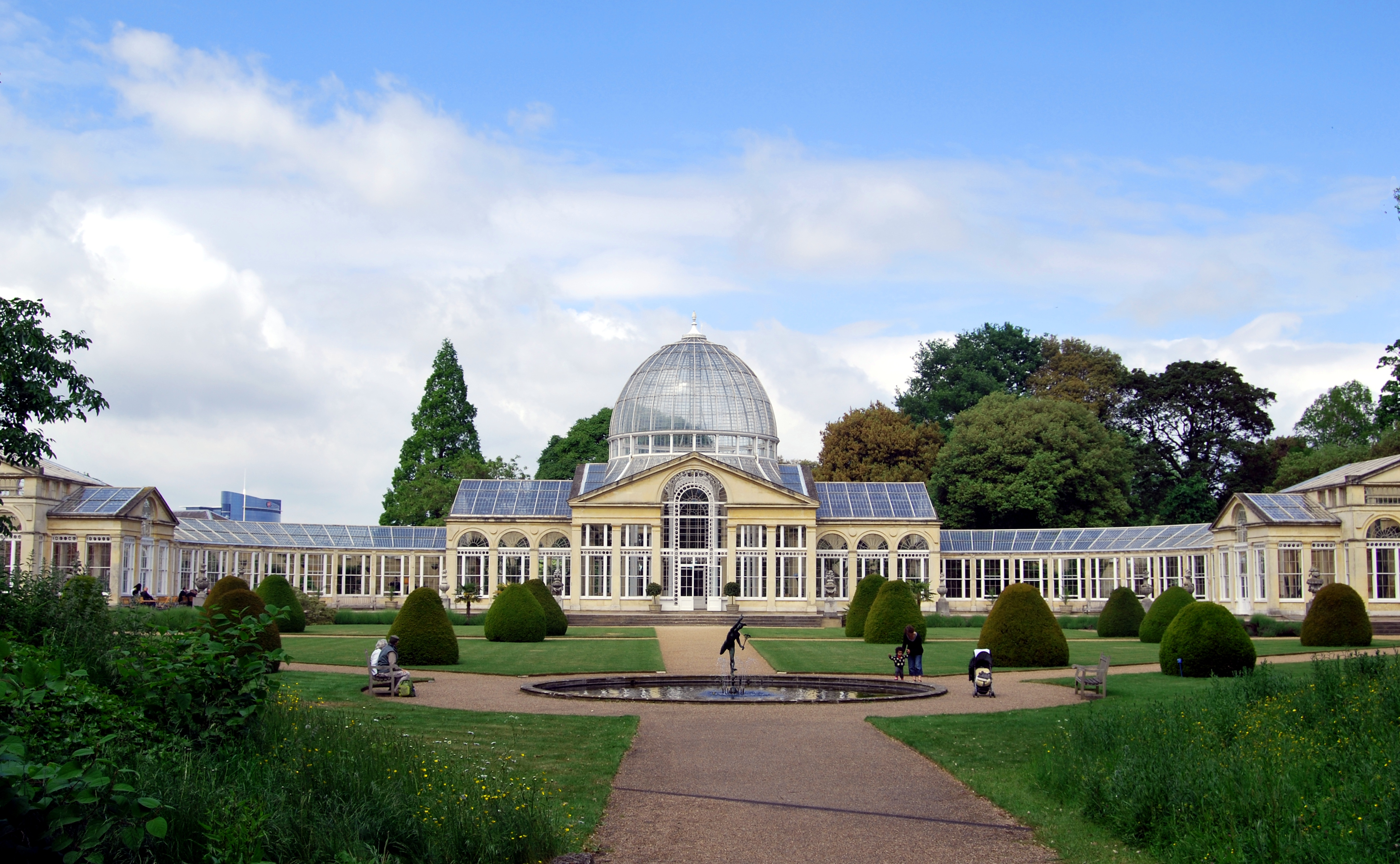
Syon House Great Conservatory

The Great Conservatory in the gardens, designed by Charles Fowler in the 1820s and completed in 1827, was the first conservatory to be built from metal and glass on a large scale. The conservatory is Grade I listed.

Henry Percy, 11th Duke of Northumberland, who was head of the family from 1988 to 1995, was noted for planting many trees in the grounds of Syon.

In 2002, the English poet Geoffrey Hill released a booklength poem, The Orchards of Syon, to much acclaim. The Orchards of Syon focuses on the history of the region and in particular on the orchard of rare trees first planted in Syon Abbey.

The London Butterfly House was based in the grounds of Syon Park from 1981 until its closure on 28 October 2007 due to Ralph Percy, 12th Duke of Northumberland's plans to build a hotel complex on the land. In 2004, planning permission was granted for the deluxe £35-million Radisson Edwardian Hotel. In 2008, the hotel became a Hilton project. In 2011, the Syon Park Waldorf Astoria hotel opened on the site. The hotel was renamed to the Hilton London Syon Park in 2013.

Also based in the grounds of Syon Park was the Heritage Motor Museum, a collection of vintage cars, which was also founded in 1981. Owing to a major increase in the number of vehicles acquired, in 1993 the museum closed and its collection was transferred to the Heritage Motor Centre at Gaydon in Warwickshire. Before that, Syon House was host to the London Transport Collection after the closure of the Clapham museum and prior to its move to Covent Garden in 1980.

In 2002 an annual archaeological dig was initiated, originally by the Channel 4 television Time Team programme, to excavate the remains of the lost abbey. The annual dig is now undertaken by Birkbeck College part of the University of London. It is backed up by a permanent exhibition in the undercroft.

In November 2010, the results from an archaeological dig made two years before on the site of the new hotel were reported, with the excavations uncovering the remains of a Roman village that existed in what was then the rural outskirts of Londinium. Artefacts uncovered included 11,500 pottery fragments, 100 coins and pieces of jewellery. Some of the finds remain unexplained, such as the discovery of skeletons "buried in ditches placed on their side". Although the skeletons date from the Roman period, this burial practice was said by the senior archaeologist to be "more suggestive of unknown prehistoric rites than Roman practice".

Syon Park is a Site of Special Scientific Interest and Grade I listed.

== Filming location ==
Syon House and its grounds have frequently been used as locations for filming including: Gosford Park, King Ralph, Emma, The Avengers, Killing Eve, Belgravia and Bridgerton.

== Gallery ==
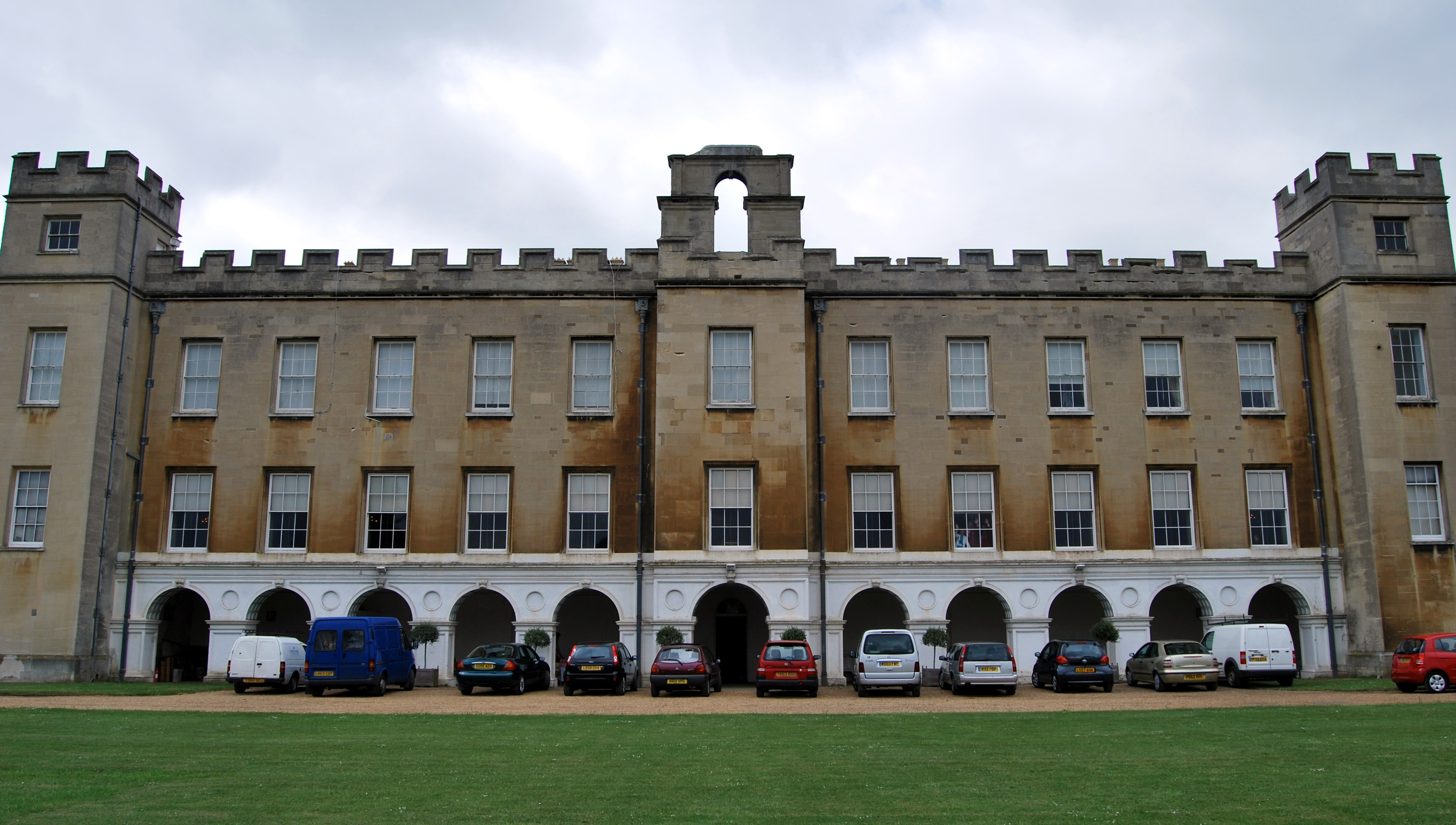
East Aspect of Syon House (c. 2010)

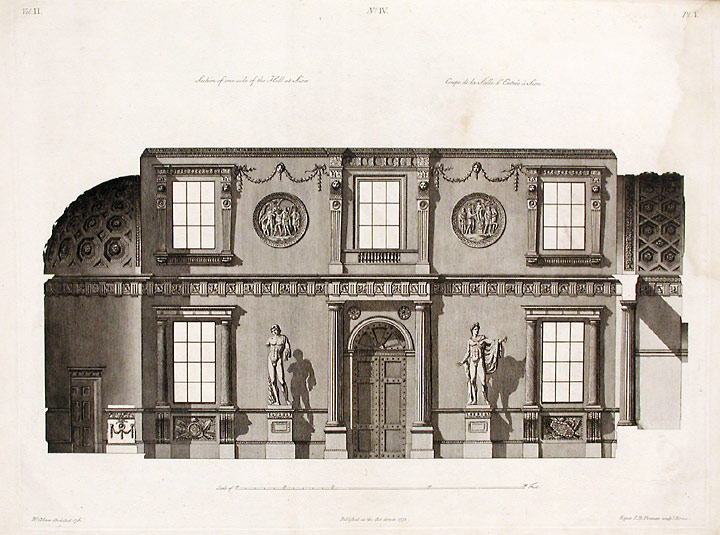
A design for the hall by Robert and James Adam

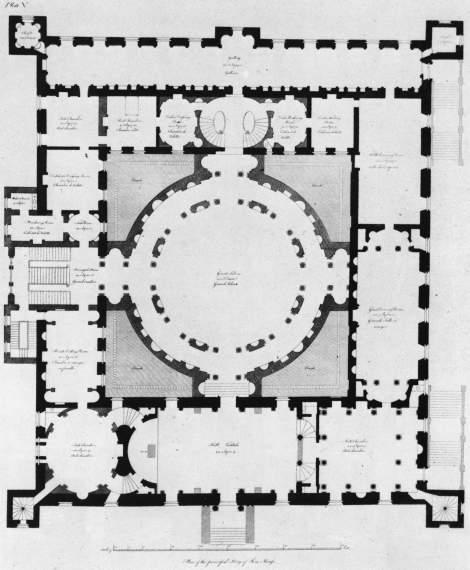
Robert Adam's plan for the reconstruction of Syon House

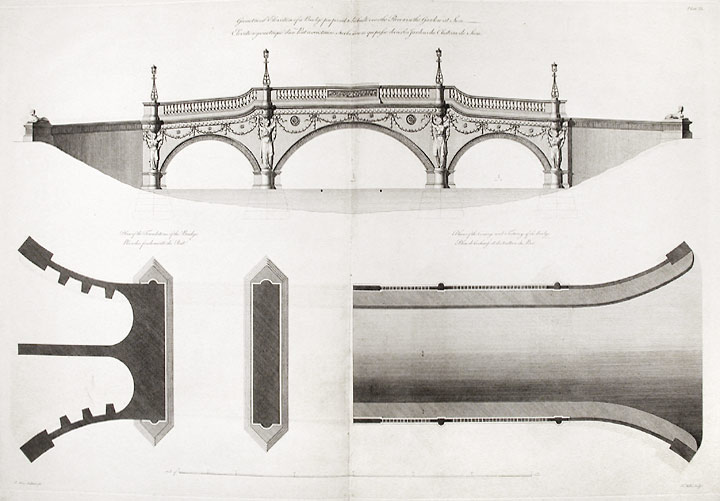
Adam design for a bridge at Syon Park

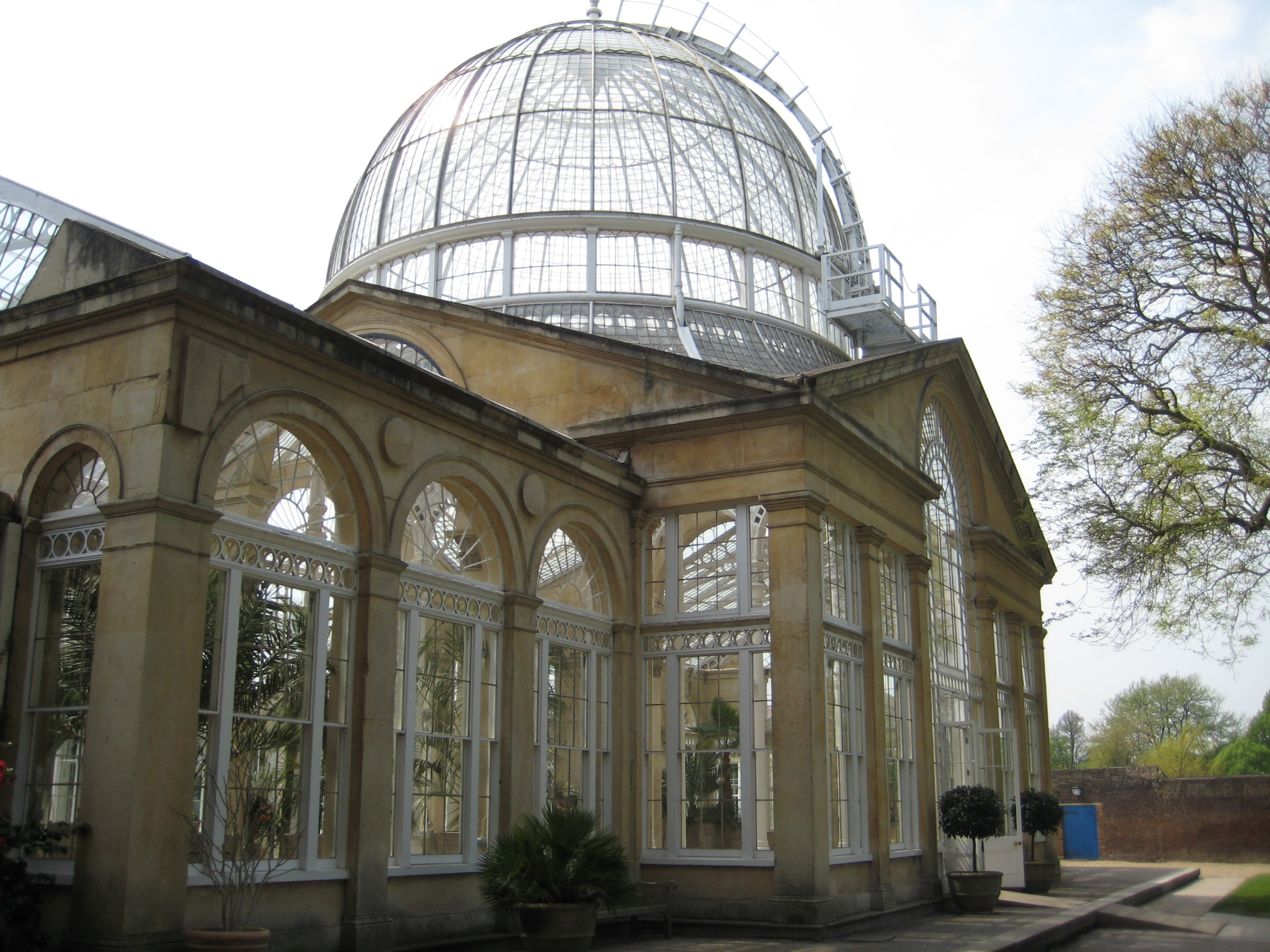
Side view of the conservatory

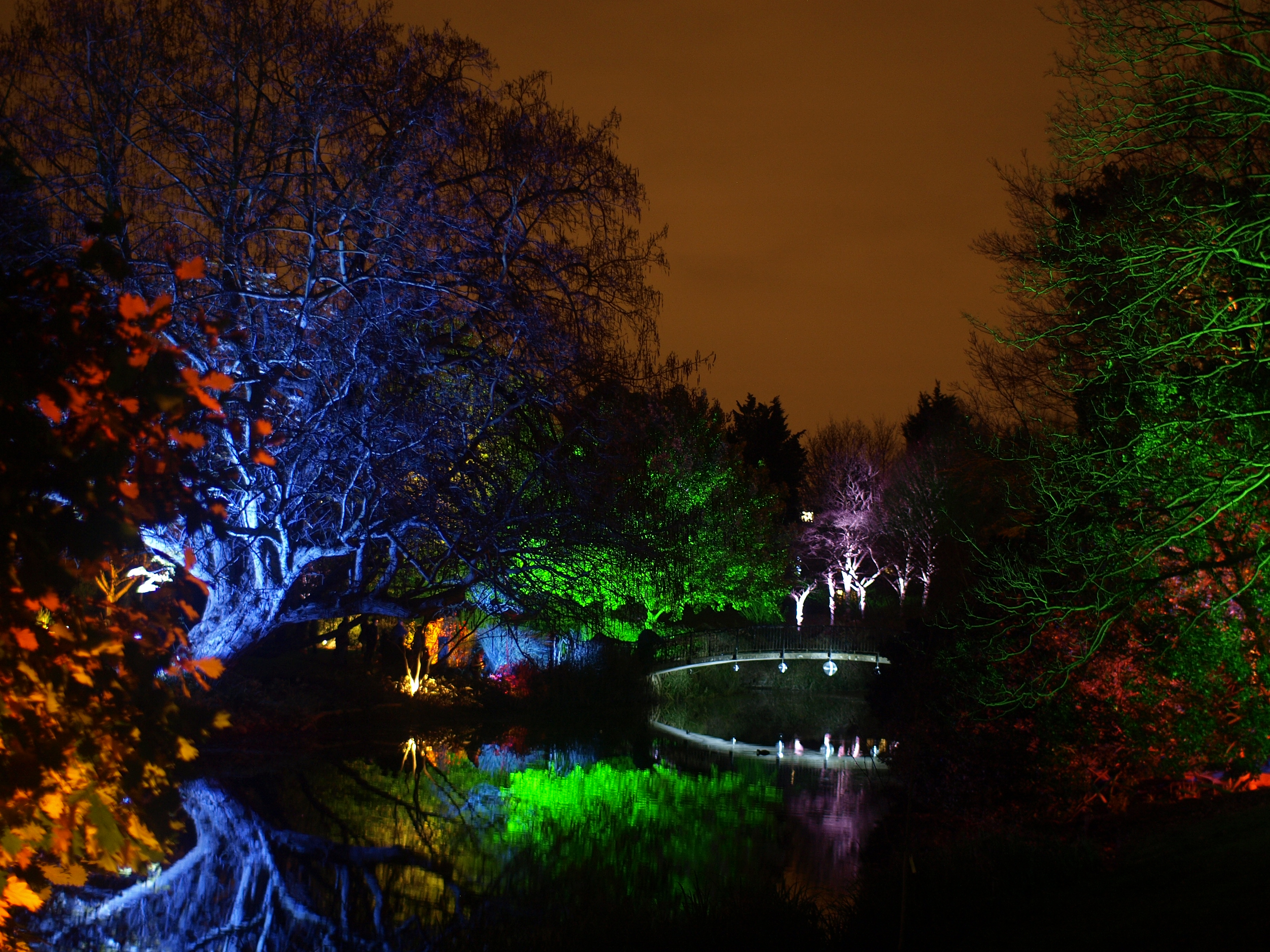
Syon Park Enchanted Woodland

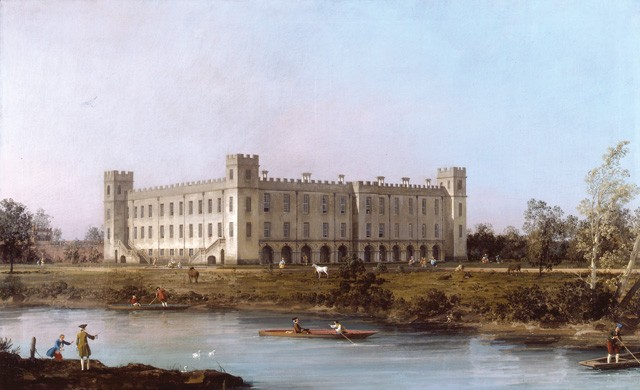
Syon House by Canaletto, 1749

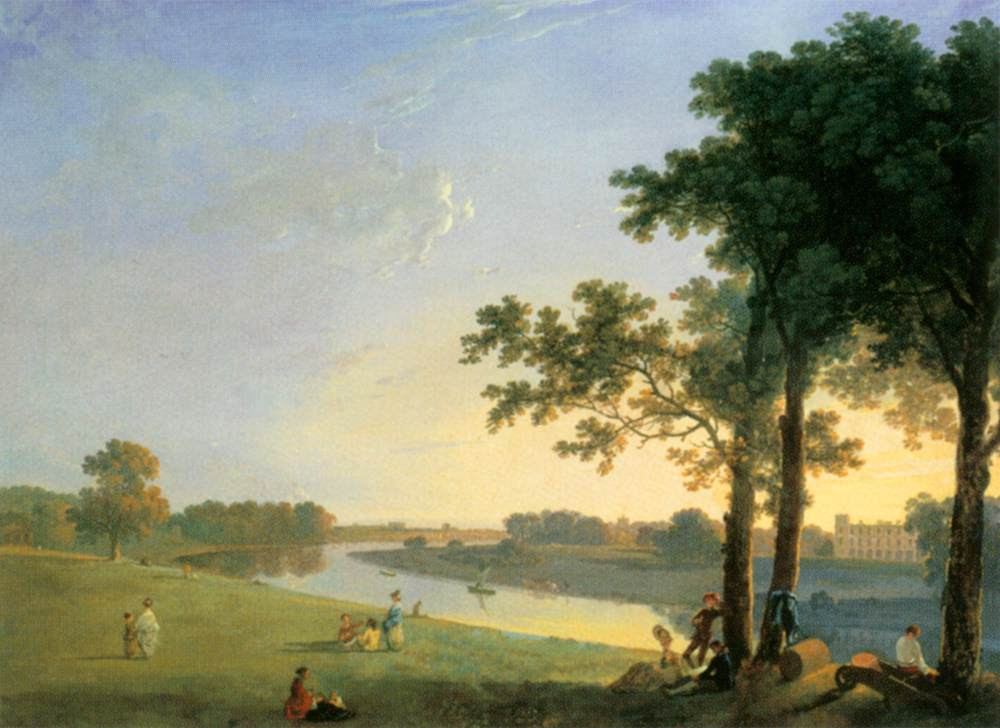
Syon House from Richmond Gardens by Richard Wilson, c.1761

== See also ==
- Alnwick Castle, the principal seat of the Dukes of Northumberland
- Hounslow parks and open spaces
- List of Sites of Special Scientific Interest in Greater London
- Northumberland House, the former central London residence of the Dukes of Northumberland, since demolished
- Treasure Houses of Britain, 1985 television documentary that shows parts of the house
