= Crane Park Island =

Nature reserve in Twickenham, London, England

Coordinates: 51.4436°N 0.3789°W

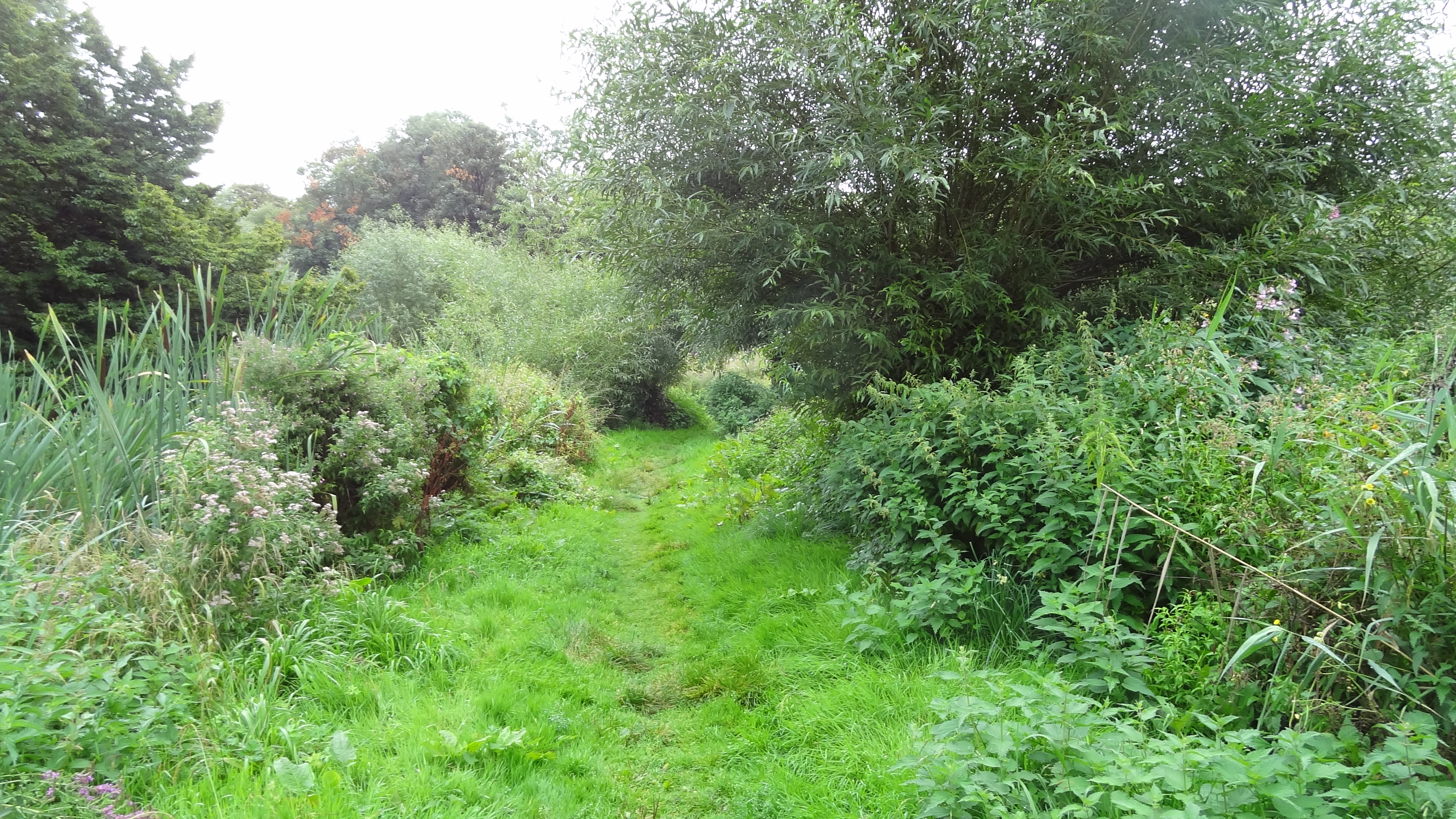
Path in Crane Park Island

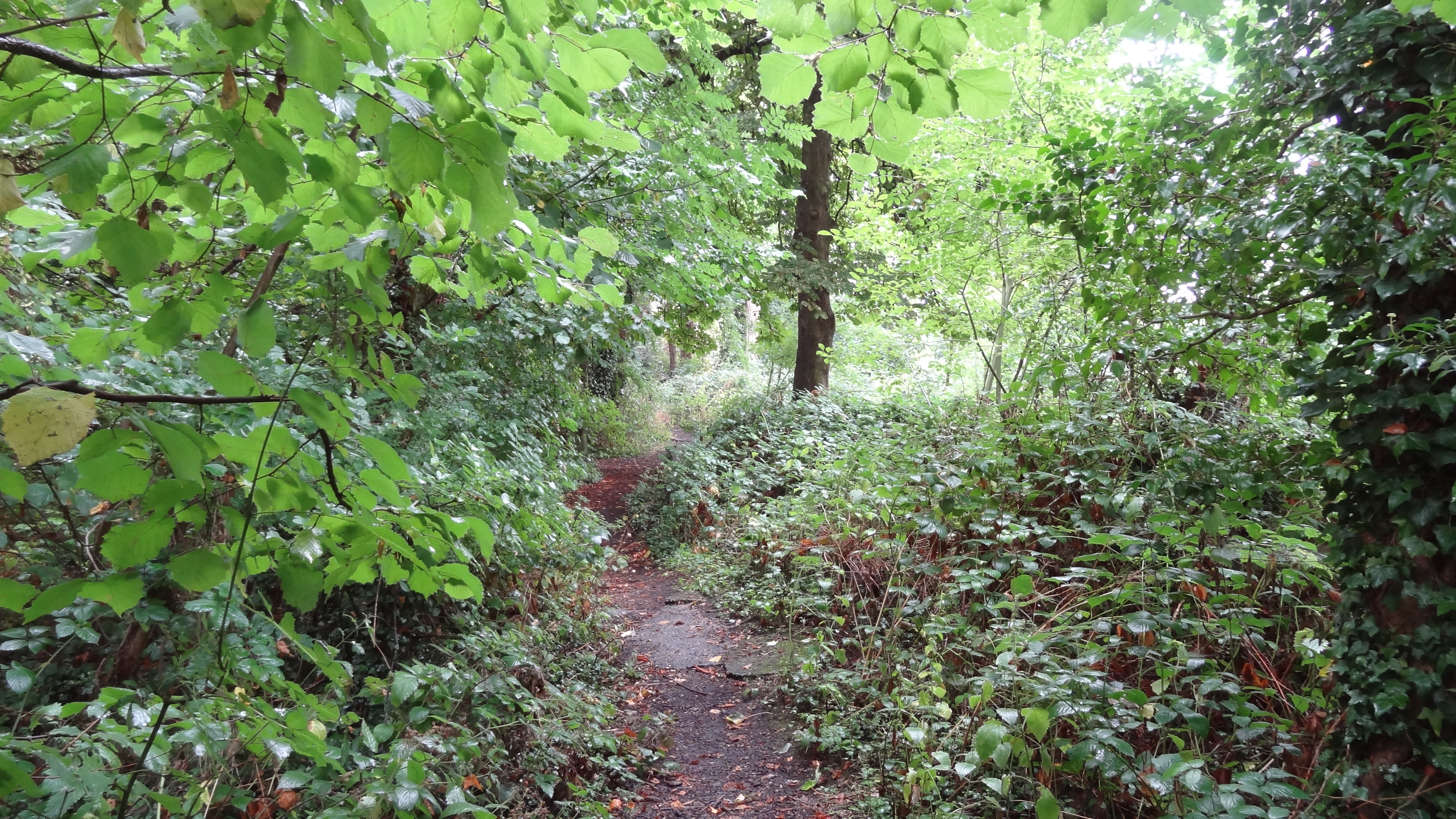
Narrow path in Crane Park Island

Crane Park Island is a Local Nature Reserve in Twickenham in the London Borough of Richmond upon Thames. It is also part of The Crane Corridor Site of Metropolitan Importance for Nature Conservation. The site is an island in the River Crane, which is owned by Richmond upon Thames London Borough Council and managed by the London Wildlife Trust. The entrance is next to the Shot Tower in Crane Park.

== History ==
The area was formerly the site of Hounslow Gunpowder Works, and the island was created to contain a mill pool to drive mill machinery. Some remains of it can still be seen, but the only major surviving structure is the Shot Tower, built in 1828. There were frequent explosions, and the Shot Tower was probably built as a watch tower to warn workers of fire hazards. The Ogden Standard on 9 July 1915 reported that there was a huge explosion heard for 10 miles (16 km). An initial small explosion warned factory workers and they were able to flee before the larger explosion. Only 1 person was killed but flying debris wounded many. In 1927 the licence to manufacture gunpowder was withdrawn, and part of the site was sold to Twickenham Council. The Council turned it into Crane Park, which opened in 1935. In 1990 Crane Park Island was designated a Local Nature Reserve.

== The site ==
The island is heavily wooded, and also has a pond and areas of scrub and reedbeds. Mammals include the rare water vole, and other animals such as kingfishers, woodpeckers, frogs, damselflies and dragonflies are also found there.
