= Crane Creek =

Crane Creek may refer to:

- Crane Creek (California), a stream in Sonoma County
- Crane Creek, California, a community in Mariposa County
- Crane Creek (Melbourne, Florida), a tributary of the Indian River
- Crane Creek (Straight River), a stream in Minnesota
- Crane Creek (James River), a stream in Missouri
- Crane Creek (Pomme de Terre River), a stream in Missouri
- Crane Creek (Bluestone River), a stream in West Virginia
