= Crane (given name) =

Crane is a masculine given name. Notable people with the name include:

- Crane Brinton (1898–1968), American historian
- Crane Kenney, American Major League Baseball executive
- Crane Wilbur (1886–1973), American writer, actor and director
