= London Butterfly House =

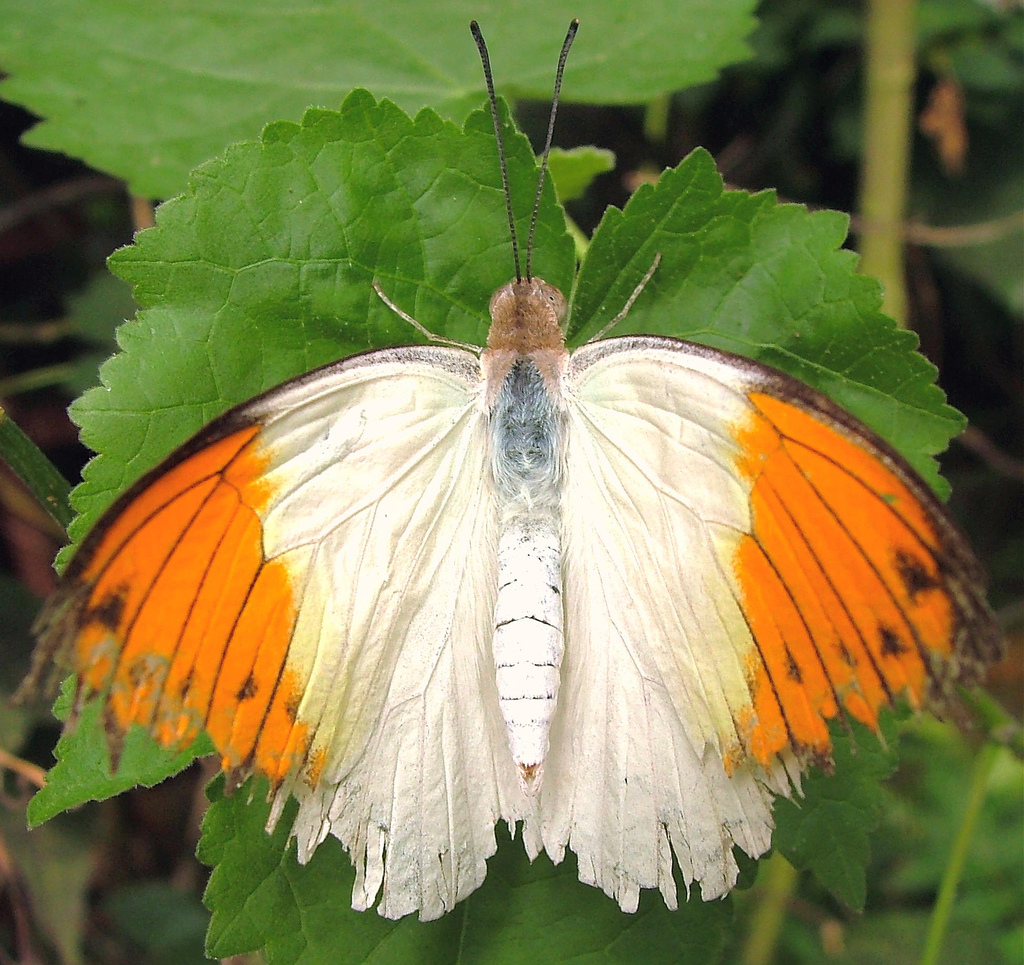
- Interactive map of London Butterfly House
- 51°28′42.88″N 0°19′1.26″W
- Date opened: 1981
- Date closed: 28 October 2007
- Location: Brentford, Greater London, England

The London Butterfly House was a visitor attraction in Brentford, Greater London, England where the public could view butterflies, birds, reptiles, amphibians, insects, and arachnids.

Set in Syon Park, the grounds of Syon House, the facility consisted of three purpose built greenhouses situated overlooking a lake. The facility contained hundreds of the world's most exotic species of butterfly, along with descriptions and illustrations. It also contained a small aviary.

The London Butterfly House closed on 28 October 2007, due to the Duke of Northumberland's plans to build a hotel complex on the land. The greenhouses were demolished in November/December 2007 and the 5 star hotel built in their place. The London Syon Park (part of the Hilton Worldwide Waldorf Astoria Hotels and Resorts) opened in March 2011 with conference facilities, restaurants, and a spa.

There was a proposal to build a replacement Butterfly House in Gunnersbury Park, but this was rejected.

The owners of the London Butterfly House acquired The Butterfly and Wildlife Park in Long Sutton, Lincolnshire, to which the creatures and many of the plants have been re-located. This location closed in 2012 due to rising costs and reduced visitor numbers.

== See also ==
- Butterfly zoo
