= On Hounslow Heath =

Painting by Richard Wilson

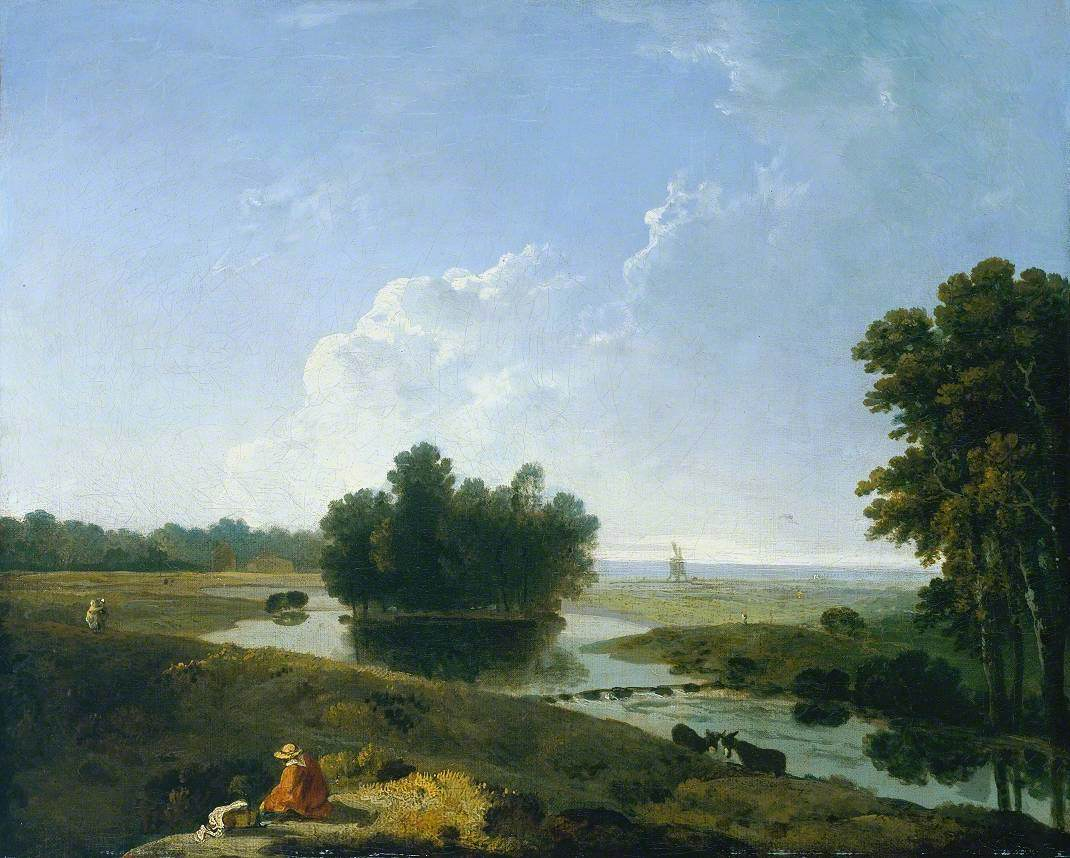
- Artist: Richard Wilson
- Year: c.1770
- Type: Oil on canvas, landscape painting
- Dimensions: 42.5 cm × 52.7 cm (16.7 in × 20.7 in)
- Location: Tate Britain, London

On Hounslow Heath is a 1770 landscape painting by the Welsh artist Richard Wilson. It depicts a view of Hounslow Heath, then located some miles to the west of London. The uncultivated landscape of the heath attracted Wilson, who returned to it as a subject several times in his work. His depiction of it is naturalistic, something of a new style for him. It emphasises the largely empty landscape, broken only by the River Crane flooding its banks in the foreground and a windmill in the distance.

It was commissioned by the bookseller Thomas Davies. The painting was displayed at the Royal Academy Exhibition of 1770. It is now in the collection of the Tate Britain in Pimlico, having been acquired in 1929. An engraved print was later produced based on the picture by Thomas Hastings.

== Bibliography ==
- Bury, Adrian. Richard Wilson, R.A.: The Grand Classic. F. Lewis, 1947.
- Fussell, George Edwin . Landscape Painting and the Agricultural Revolution. Pindar Press, 1984.
- Solkin, David H. Richard Wilson: The Landscape of Reaction. Tate Gallery, 1982.
- Waites, Ian. Common Land in English Painting, 1700-1850. Boydell Press, 2012.
