= Crane High School =

Crane High School may refer to one of the schools in the United States:

- Crane High School (Chicago)
- Crane High School (Illinois)
- Crane High School (Missouri)
- Crane High School (Texas)
- Crane Union High School, in Crane, Oregon
