= Jimmy Bishop =

American politician

Member of the Tennessee House of Representatives from the 79th district
- In office January 14, 1975 – January 9, 1979
- Preceded by: Elbert Gill (redistricted)
- Succeeded by: Floyd Crain

Personal details
- Born: May 4, 1941 Henry County, Tennessee, U.S.
- Died: January 10, 2013 (aged 71) Memphis, Tennessee, U.S.
- Party: Democratic
- Spouse: Judy Hay (m. 1962)
- Children: 3
- Website: House website

Jimmy Bishop (May 4, 1941 – January 10, 2013) was an American politician. He served as a Democratic member of the Tennessee House of Representatives.

== Life and career ==
Bishop was born in Henry County, Tennessee, the son of Lucile Goodman and William Bryan Bishop. He was a salesman.

Bishop served in the Tennessee House of Representatives from 1975 to 1979.

Bishop died in January 2013 in Memphis, Tennessee, at the age of 71.
