= Crane Creek (Straight River tributary) =

Stream in Minnesota, U.S.

Coordinates: 44°08′59″N 93°14′48″W

Crane Creek is a stream in the U.S. state of Minnesota. It is a tributary of the Straight River.

Crane Creek was named for the cranes which once frequented this waterway.

== See also ==
- List of rivers of Minnesota
