= Crane Kenney =

Baseball executive

Crane Kenney is a Major League Baseball executive with the Chicago Cubs, serving as their President of Business Operations. Kenney formerly served as chairman of the Cubs in 2010 and 2011.
