= Crane Park =

Public park next to the River Crane in Twickenham, England

Coordinates: 51.4432°N 0.37534°W

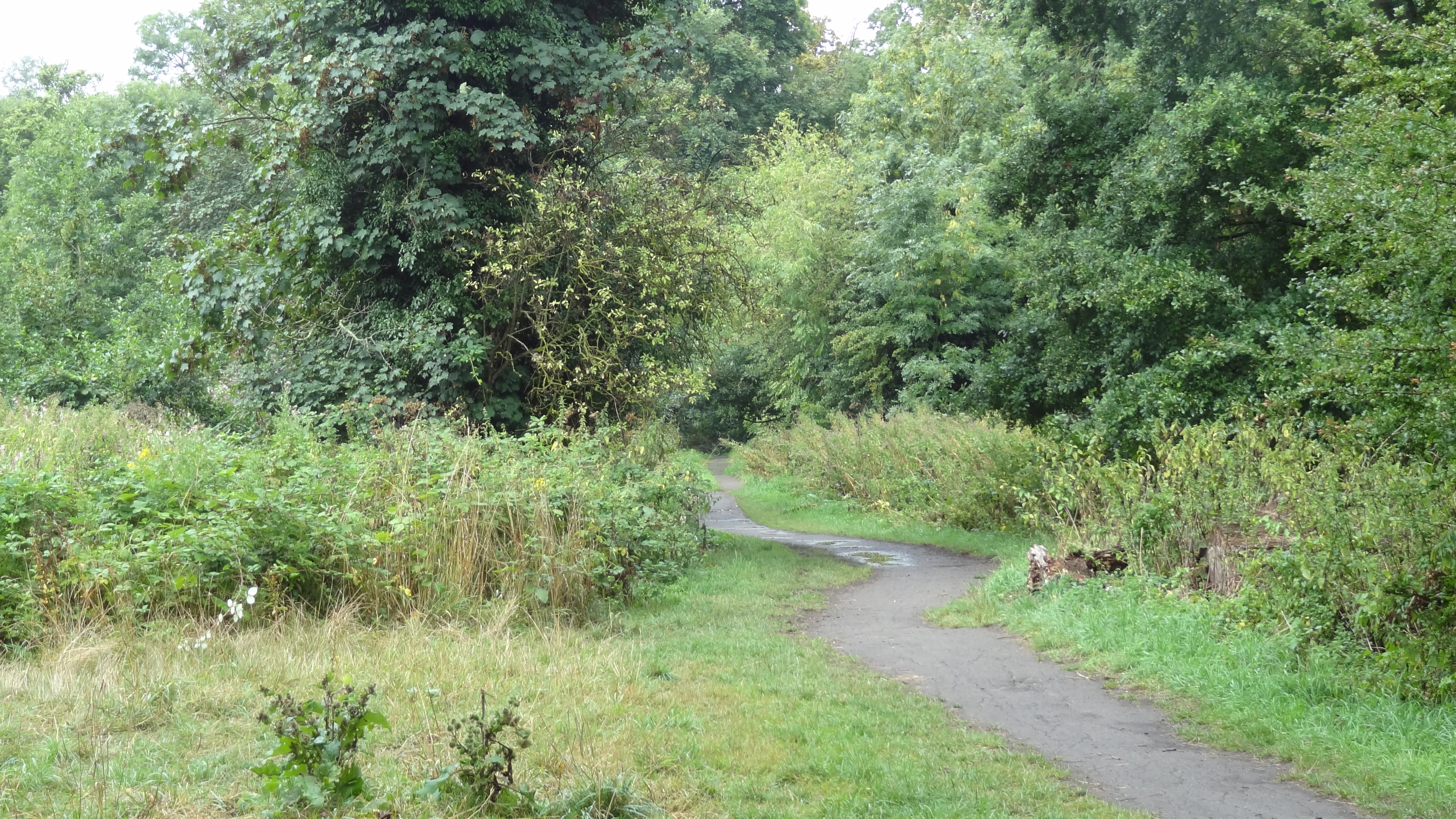
Path in Crane Park

Crane Park is a 30 hectare public park next to the River Crane in western Twickenham. The park north of the river is in the London Borough of Richmond upon Thames, and the south in the London Borough of Hounslow. It is part of The Crane Corridor Site of Metropolitan Importance for Nature Conservation, and includes two Local Nature Reserves, Crane Park Island and Pevensey Road.

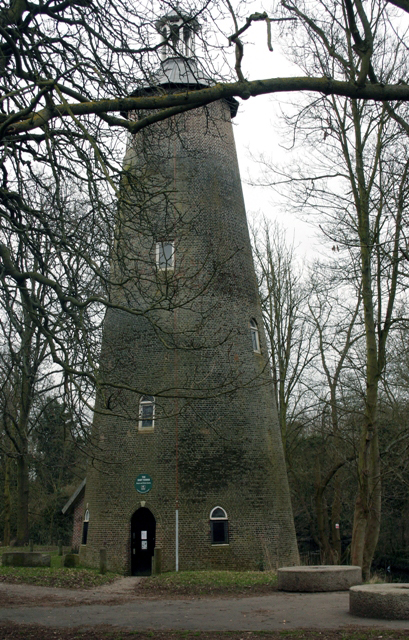
The Shot Tower

== History ==
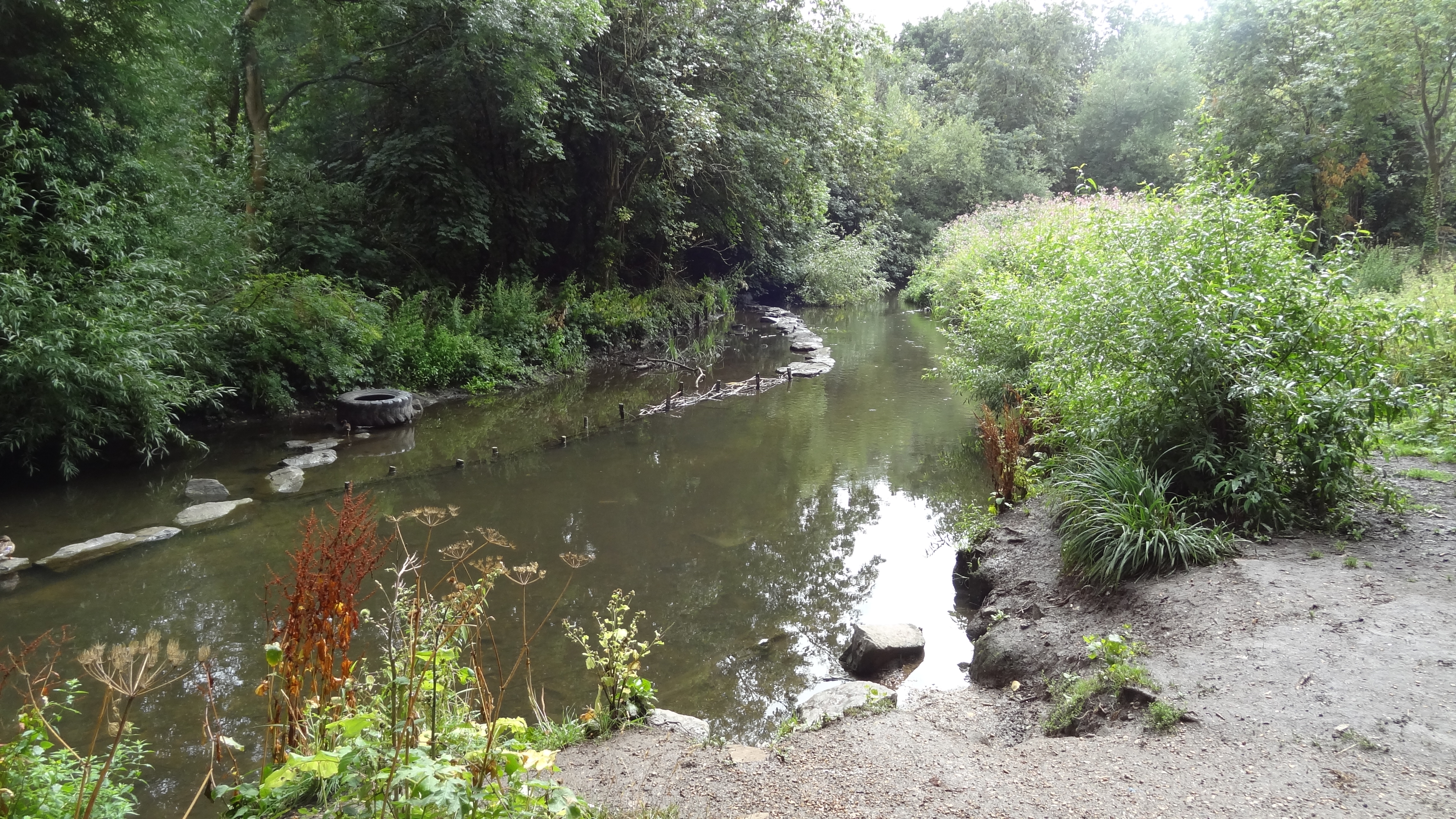
River Crane in Crane Park

The Hounslow Gunpowder Works opened in the late 1760s in what is now the western end of the park. Crane Park Island was created to provide a mill pond for the water to drive the machinery. There were many explosions and the Shot Tower (pictured right) is now thought to have been a windmill for recirculating water to power the mills, rather than a shot tower for making lead shot.

The licence to manufacture gunpowder was withdrawn in 1927, and part of the site was sold to Twickenham Council, which turned it into Crane Park. This opened in 1935, and was inherited by Richmond Council when Twickenham Council was abolished in 1965. The Shot Tower (now officially the Brick Tower) is a Grade II listed building.

== Wildlife ==
The park has large areas of woodland, as well as pasture areas and the river bank, and it also has important industrial archaeology. It is managed to encourage wildlife, and Marsh frogs and the scarce water vole breed on the banks of the river.

== Access ==
Although the park borders the London Borough of Hounslow, it is only accessible from Twickenham. There are entrances on Crane Park Road, Ellerman Avenue, Hanworth Road, Mill Road, Great Chertsey Road, Hospital Bridge Road and Meadway. The London Loop long-distance footpath goes through the park.
