= Floyd H. Crain =

American politician (1929–2023)

Floyd Crain

Member of the Tennessee House of Representatives
- In office January 9, 1979 – January 10, 1995
- Preceded by: Jimmy Bishop
- Succeeded by: Craig Fitzhugh
- Constituency: 79th district (1979-1983); 82nd district (1983-1995)

Personal details
- Born: Floyd Harrell Crain; June 3, 1929 Lauderdale County, Tennessee, U.S.
- Died: July 17, 2023 (aged 94) Ripley, Tennessee, U.S.
- Party: Democratic
- Spouse: Joann Biggs (m. 1954)
- Children: 3
- Education: University of Tennessee (PharmD)
- Website: House website

Military service
- Allegiance: United States
- Branch/service: United States Army
- Rank: First lieutenant

Floyd Harrell Crain (June 3, 1929 – July 17, 2023) was an American politician in the state of Tennessee. Crain served in the Tennessee House of Representatives from 1979 to 1995. A Democrat, he also served a stint as the Majority Floor Leader in the House. He represented the state's 82nd legislative district. Born in Lauderdale County, Tennessee, Crain was a pharmacist and member of the Methodist church. He was a graduate of Ripley High School and the University of Tennessee. He lived in Ripley, Tennessee.

Crain married Joann Elizabeth Biggs on June 4, 1954, in Polk County, Tennessee. He died on July 17, 2023.
