= River Crane, London =

River in Greater London, England

Crane
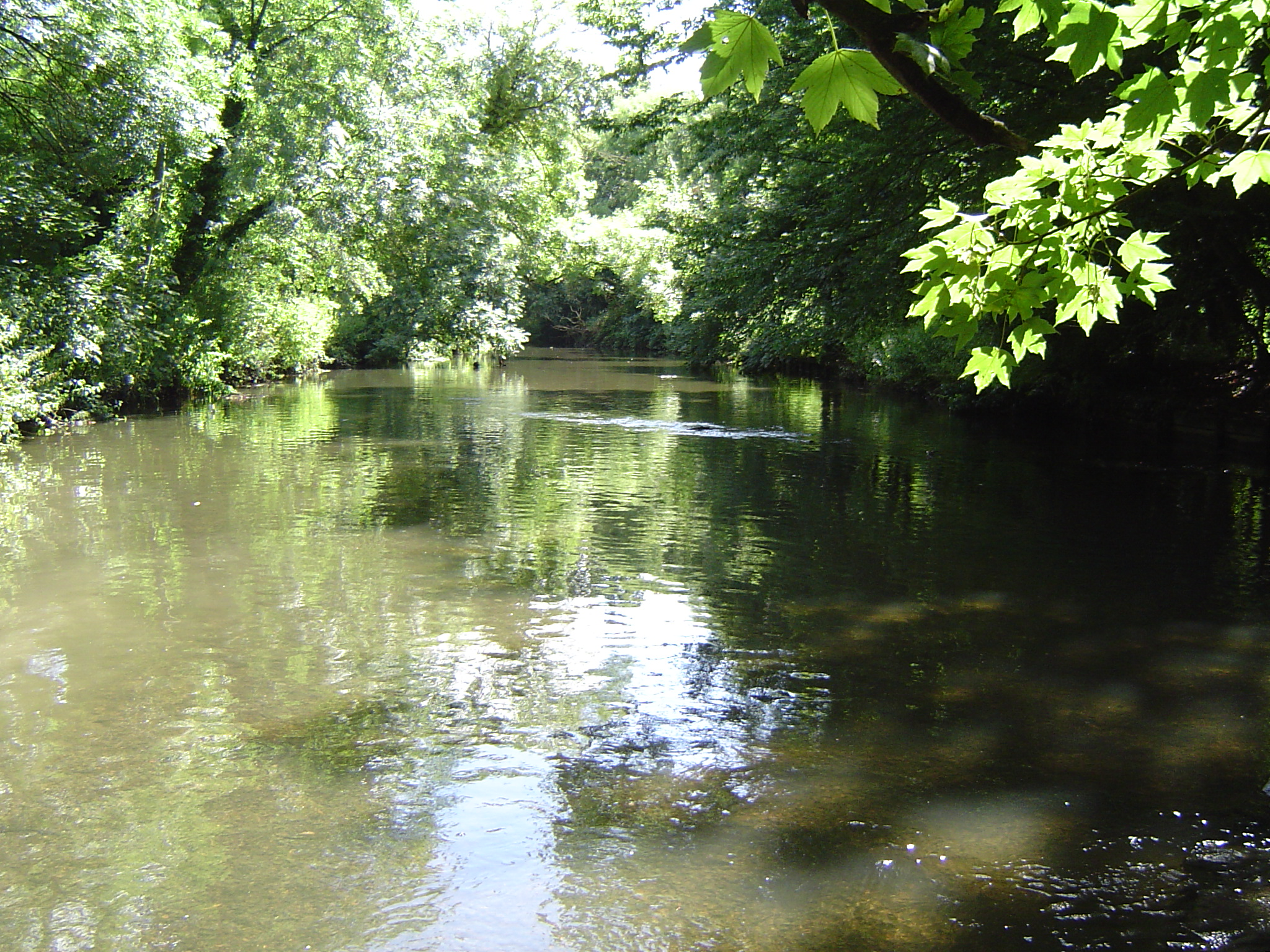
- River Crane in Crane Park, Twickenham below the nature reserve and powder mills site

- River Crane, London (London Borough of Hounslow) River Crane, London (Greater London)

Location
- Country: England
- Districts / Boroughs: London Boroughs of Hillingdon, Hounslow, Richmond upon Thames
- Places with main adjoining parkland: Cranford, Hounslow Heath, Whitton

Physical characteristics
- Source: nominal point of transition from Yeading Brook
  - location: Traditional tripoint of Cranford, Hayes and Southall (Note: Bridge of the former Cranford Lane, today North Hyde Road, over the river; today, in all but Anglican terms, the tripoint is the nearby unconnected canal junction 300 metres northeast.)
  - coordinates: 51°29′53″N 0°24′39″W
- Mouth: River Thames: Tideway
  - location: Isleworth
- Length: 13.6 km (8.5 mi)
- Discharge
  - location: Marsh Farm
  - average: 0.54 m^{3}/s (19 cu ft/s)
  - minimum: 0.00 m^{3}/s (0 cu ft/s)5 December 1982
  - maximum: 13.4 m^{3}/s (470 cu ft/s)28 December 1979
- Discharge
  - location: Cranford Park
  - average: 0.51 m^{3}/s (18 cu ft/s)

Basin features
- Tributaries
  - right: Yeading Brook, Upper Duke of Northumberland's River

The River Crane, a tributary of the River Thames, runs 8.5 miles (13.6 km) in West London, England. It forms the lower course of Yeading Brook. It adjoins or passes through three London boroughs: Hillingdon, Hounslow and Richmond upon Thames, in the historic county of Middlesex. The drainage basin is heavily urbanised but many of the Hayes to Whitton flood-meadows have been conserved, forming a narrow, green vale, opening out to what remains of Hounslow Heath in the centre – a near-continuous belt of semi-natural habitat.

At the start of the twentieth century, several small sewage works discharged to the river. However, these have been consolidated with others into one (Mogden Sewage Treatment Works) which discharges directly to the upper estuary of the Thames (the Tideway).

The Crane's form has been greatly altered by river engineering works: over centuries the watercourse has been subject to widening, narrowing, straightening, dredging and bank reinforcement. The greatest of such works has been the two-phase construction of the Duke of Northumberland's River (DNR), a tributary and distributary, to guarantee water power to mills, now demolished, across the south and southeast of Isleworth, which in latter decades worked calico cloth as well as grain. The Lower DNR also waters the grand fish pond inherited from Syon Abbey, which gave way in the dissolution of the monasteries to Syon House (Note: the southern main home of the Dukes mentioned, the seniormost nobles of the Percy family) and Syon Park. The semi-private park, with its scenic tea room, garden centre and hotel, has a nature reserve zone alongside the Thames. Its lake is still refreshed via sluice and culvert from the Lower DNR's Mill Plat, and thus is supplied by virtue of the Crane from the Colne and the Yeading Brook. The latter means the river system has sources in the London boroughs of Harrow and Ealing (in Southall as an overflow offtake from the Paddington Arm of the Grand Union Canal).

== Location ==
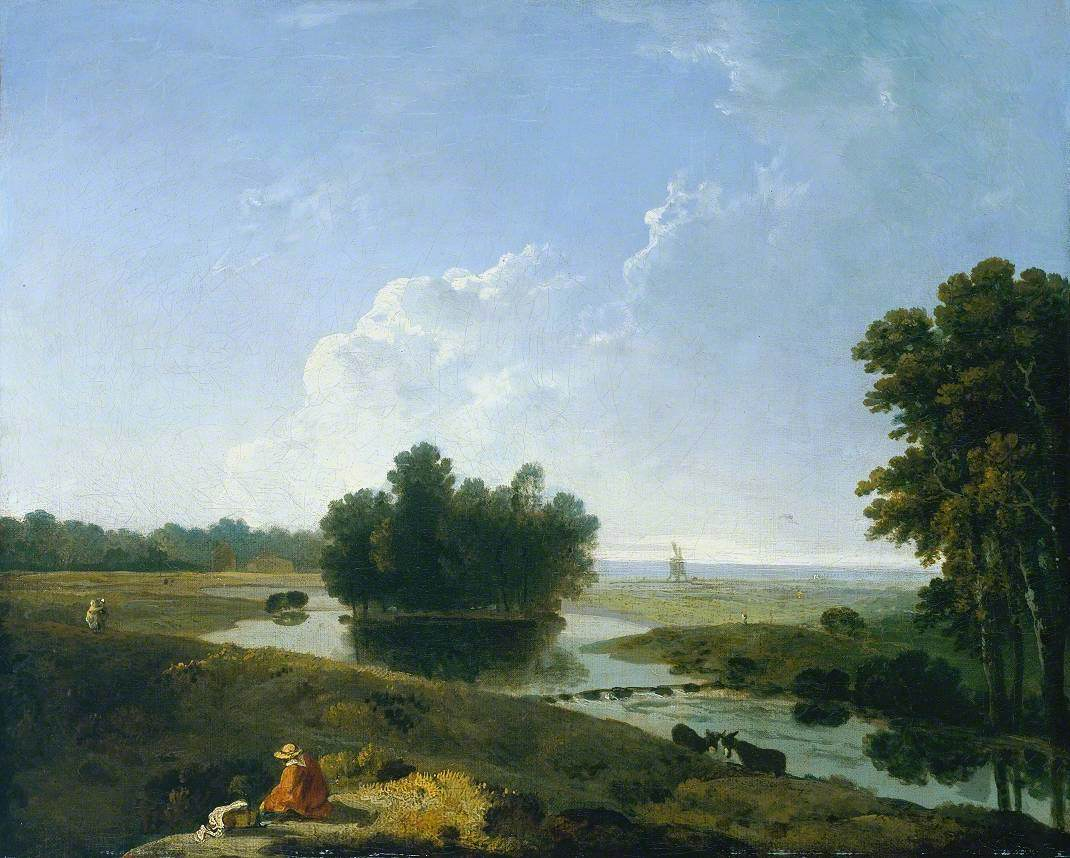
On Hounslow Heath by Richard Wilson, 1770.

The Crane has always been so marked in maps of Cranford, rather than as the Yeading Brook. Here the east end of North Hyde Road in the far south-east of Hayes has a bridge which is on the boundary between the two districts (and the traditional parishes), from where its course is nearly semi-circular to the south then east, joining the tidal Thames at the boundary of St Margarets and Isleworth, just to the south of Isleworth Ait.

Passing through Cranford, the river crosses Cranford Countryside Park, skirts the eastern side of Heathrow Airport's car parks (formerly the Cranford Heath part of Hounslow Heath) and North Feltham, the latter split from Hounslow West on the other bank by most of what is left of Hounslow Heath; here the (Upper) Duke of Northumberland's River joins the Crane. (Note: A distributary of the River Colne and passes along the west and southern perimeter of the airport before joining) From this point, the Crane turns gradually east and passes through Crane Park, Twickenham. In Crane Park is the site of the Hounslow Powder Mills which were built in the 16th century and continued to make gunpowder until 1927. The mills have disappeared, but the Shot Tower still stands nearby. The large millpool on an island above the mills is now a Local Nature Reserve, Crane Park Island. A distributary splits off (forming a second section of the Duke's River) at Kneller Gardens. The Crane itself flows north east through central Twickenham and then north through the Cole Park area. The river is tidal in the final stretch between Cole Park Island and the confluence with the Thames. The Lower Duke's River is tidal for the short distance below the weir by the bridge in Church Street, Isleworth, to its confluence with the Thames. Upstream in Isleworth it has been diverted to flow through Mogden Sewage Treatment Works, where it provides coolant for the power station. Treated sewage effluent from the works is not discharged here but is instead piped to the Tideway (upper estuary of the Thames) at Isleworth Ait.

The Crane in major part delimits the London boroughs of

- Hillingdon and Hounslow.
- Hounslow and "Richmond". (Note: Richmond upon Thames is usually abbreviated in Southern England sources as the other Richmond is in northern England)

When extending the Piccadilly line from Hounslow West to Heathrow Airport, the high water table of the ground beneath the Crane made it impractical to tunnel under the river channel, so the lines briefly emerge from their tunnels here and cross over the watercourse via a bridge.

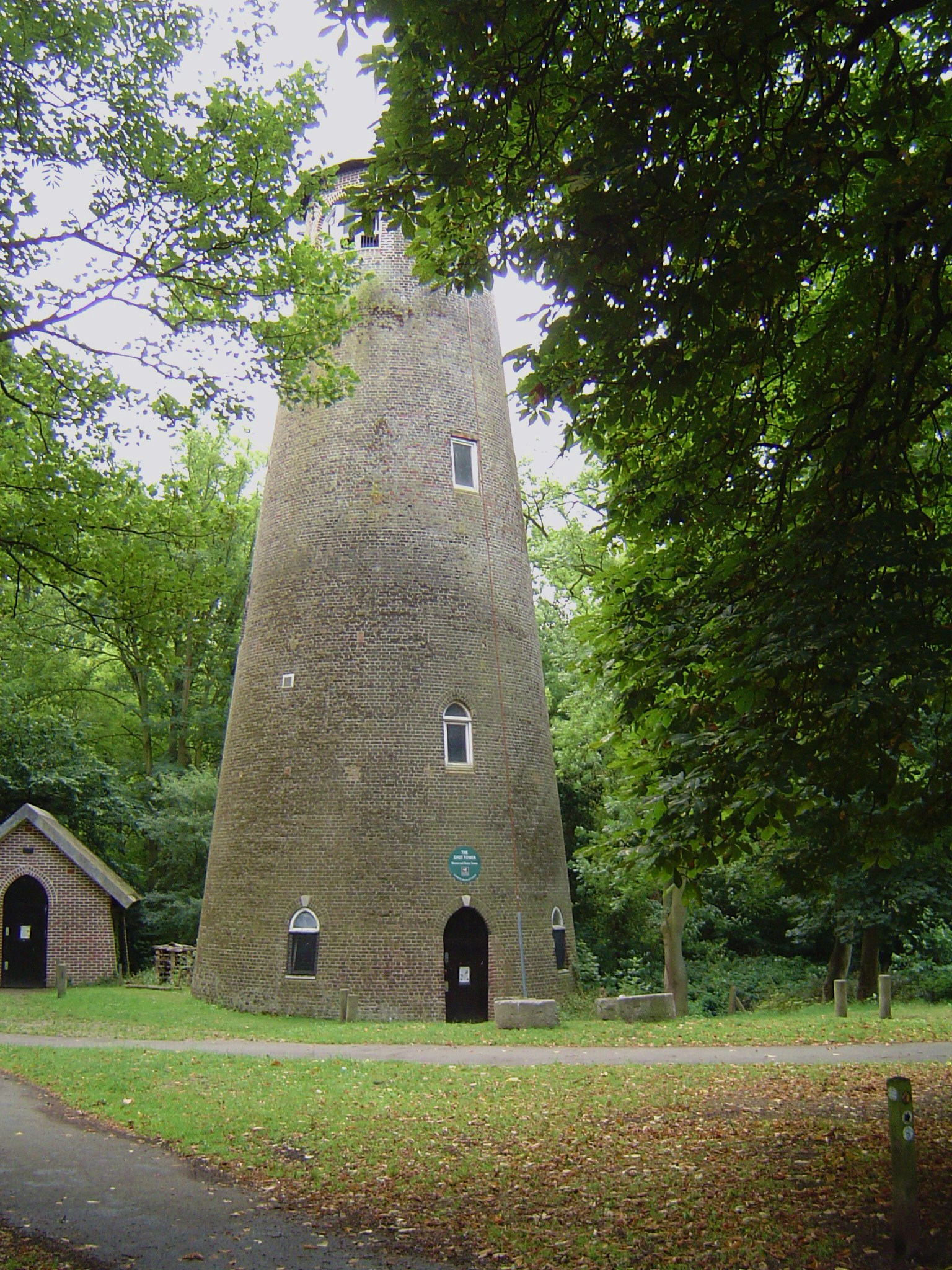
The Shot Tower in Crane Park

== Etymology ==
Its name is interwoven with Cranford and may be from crane (bird)s.

== Associated watercourses ==
- The Yeading Brook system forms the Crane's headwaters. There are two branches, the Yeading Brook West and Yeading Brook East, both of which arise in the London Borough of Harrow. They merge just south of the A40 in the London Borough of Hillingdon. The Yeading Brook becomes the River Crane in the stretch between Minet Country Park and Cranford Country Park. [The Environment Agency's Catchment Data Explorer shows the lower limit of the Yeading Brook and start of the River Crane to be approximately where the Great Western Railway crosses the river corridor at Southall.] Before the 19th century the Yeading Brook was also referred to as the Fish Bourne or Fishbourne.
- Duke of Northumberland's River: this man-made river has two distinct sections, constructed at different times. The Upper DNR is purely a tributary of the Crane and a distributary of the Colne. It taps the Colne at Longford; it feeds the Crane at the far west of Hounslow. The Lower DNR is a distributary of the Crane, flowing from the diffluence at Whitton to the upper estuary of the Thames (the Tideway) in the adjoining parish and former manor of Isleworth.
- Frogs Ditch flows from south west Hayes, crossing under the M4 motorway before running along the western and southern boundaries of Cranford Countryside Park to feed the Crane immediately upstream of the Cranford Lane road bridge at the southern end of the park.
- The Whitton Brook flows into the River Crane at the Cole Park Allotments site.

== Definitive Crane reaches ==
The inset map shows in highlighted blue the quite steady slope used for General Roy's baseline, used for the Anglo-French Survey (1784–1790), starting the first exact co-ordinating of two premier European observatories. It supposedly had about a millimetre of error per kilometre, by the mid-19th century shown to be a few centimetres. To the east of this it shows the definitive reaches of the Crane.

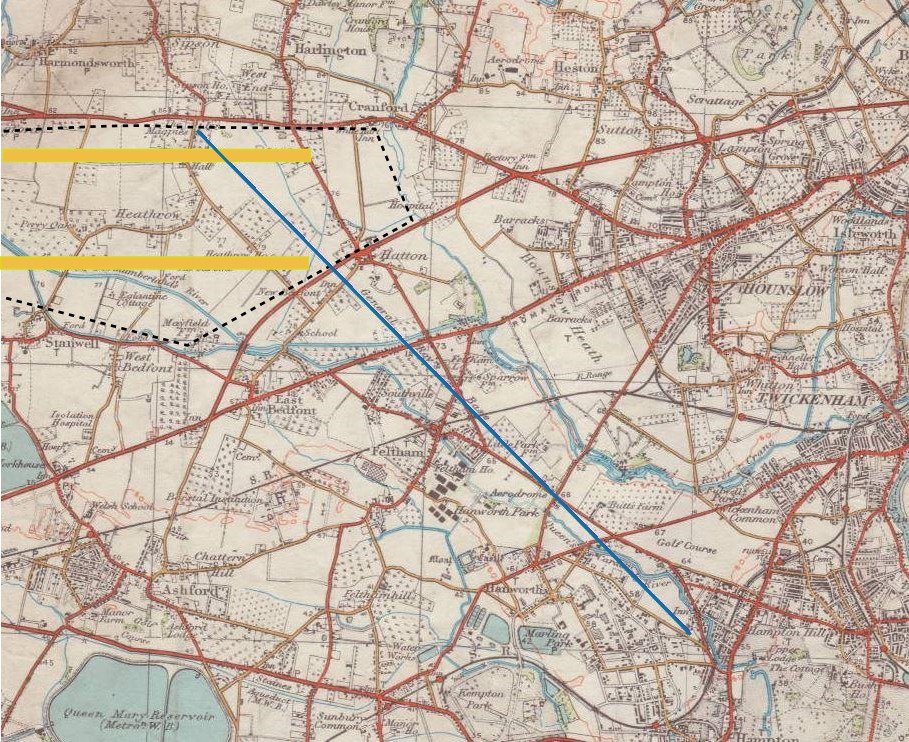
Map of 1930s showing all but the uppermost mile or so of the unambiguous reaches of the river. The south mouth of the two on the right (in the east) is the Crane's natural mouth to the Tideway, the upper estuary of the Thames. The other, at first a leat, is the Lower DNR.

== Pollution incidents ==
=== October 2011 ===
From 29 to 31 October 2011, about one day of the Heathrow zone's raw sewage was, due to a valve jam, diverted into the Crane. A two-metre inter-pipe valve jammed shut on Saturday morning at Cranford Bridge on the A4 Bath Road while Thames Water engineers carried out routine maintenance. Unable to force it back open, they arranged for the backed-up sewage to be taken away in tanker lorries for treatment. The volume of sewage meant tanker removal could not keep pace. Faced with a choice between letting the excess sewage back up into basements of Bath Road hotels and various airport roads or spill to the Crane, the much cheaper option prevailed, resulting in discharge until 3 am on Monday and damaged wildlife. This killed 3,000 fish.

=== October 2013 ===
The Environment Agency ("EA") has launched an investigation into a 'pollution incident' at the River Crane in which appeared to have killed many fish. The agency was called into action following several reports from members of the public that a section of the river at Twickenham had turned black and fish were seen in distress. The source of the pollution has been traced to an outfall pipe upstream of the A30, and EA officers are at the scene working with partners to minimise the impact of the incident.

— Get West London (Mirror Group Newspapers)

Three days later, a temporary coffer dam of sandbags spanned the river, just north of the Piccadilly Line bridge. A bulk road tanker with flexible hoses extracted polluted water above this.

The Crane Valley Partnership later noted that the EA traced the source to a fractured main (probably caused by illegal ground works) of sewage sludge between the Mogden works and Iver; escaping sludge drained away via legitimate surface water drains.

== Catchment partnership ==
The Crane Valley Partnership (CVP) is the relevant 'Catchment Based Approach' (CaBA) catchment partnership. It strategises and co-ordinates efforts to manage and improve the Crane and its tributaries, including enhancing biodiversity, water quality and quantity, connectivity, public access, community cohesion, and historical and educational opportunities. In summary, CVP aims to restore one of London’s most natural river systems, conserve surrounding habitats and improve public access so that nearby communities can enjoy contact with the natural world.

CVP stemmed from the West London Biodiversity Practitioners Group, derived from the partnerships of the Hounslow Local Biodiversity Action Plan. The Group held its first meeting on 13 November 2002, at Heathrow's "Mayfield Farm" classroom. The original members included: teams from the London Boroughs of Hounslow and Hillingdon, Groundwork Thames Valley, Syon Park Estate, Thames Water, Heathrow Airport Ltd, Glendale/British Airways, English Nature, London Wildlife Trust (LWT), Royal Society for the Protection of Birds (RSPB).

The main objective of the Group was to encourage local conservation work. The Group reconvened the next February and July. The partnership then evolved to become the River Crane Management Forum (RCMF), which had its first meeting the next June. Members present were:

- Environment Agency (EA)
- Greater London Authority (GLA)
- Heathrow Airport Landside Property Services
  - A Rocha, WSP for the above, Penny Anderson Associates.
- Glendale for Heathrow Airport Landside Property Services
- London Borough of Hounslow
- London Wildlife Trust
- Friends of the River Crane Environment (FORCE)
- London Borough of Hillingdon
- London Borough of Ealing

These agreed an aspiration for action along the Crane to improve water quality and biodiversity, as well as promoting the significance of the river corridor as part of the West London Green Chain. The Forum had another meeting on 20 July 2005, when the CVP was established. Up until 2021, its meetings were customarily hosted and chaired by an educational charity:

- Green Corridor

In April 2013, the Partnership appointed a Development Manager employed through this charity, initially utilising a sum of £400,000 provided by Thames Water following the 2011 incident. More recently CVP's staffing/administration costs have been met by annual contributions from a number of the partner organisations including Thames Water.

In 2021 the hosting/chairing service was taken on by the Crane Valley Community Interest Company (CVCIC), specifically set up for this purpose [Company Number:13302764].

== See also ==
- Tributaries of the River Thames
- List of rivers in England

== Notes and references ==
Footnotes

Citations
