= Hartwell Crain =

American politician

Hartwell G. Crain (November 29, 1900 - September 29, 1981) was an American Republican politician who served in the Missouri General Assembly. He served in the Missouri Senate between 1945 and 1961.

Born in St. Louis, Missouri, he was educated at Kirkwood High School and the Law School of the University of Michigan.
