= Richard Goodson =

English musician and composer

Richard Goodson (c.1655 – 13 January 1718) was an English musician and composer, who held the post of Heather Professor of Music at the University of Oxford.

== Life and career ==
Richard Goodson, the son of an Oxford publican also called Richard, was a member of the choir of Christ Church Cathedral, Oxford, firstly as a boy chorister from 1667 and then as one of the gentlemen of the choir from 1675 to 1681. At this time, Edward Lowe was the organist and master of the choristers at the cathedral and also Heather Professor of Music at the University of Oxford. The two of them became friends, and Lowe was Goodson's supporter and teacher. On Lowe's death in 1682, Goodson succeeded him as professor, and later also held the positions of organist of New College, Oxford (appointed 1683) and organist of Christ Church (1692). He obtained further music manuscripts to add to the resources of Oxford's music school. He died in Great Tew, Oxfordshire, on 13 January 1718 and was buried in the cathedral. He had at least three children with his wife Mary, including a son called Richard, who succeeded his father in his professorship and Christ Church position.

== Compositions ==
Goodson's choral music includes a setting of the canticles for Mattins in C major, found in the collections of Durham Cathedral. Most of his compositions are to be found only in manuscript form in Oxford, rather than having been published contemporaneously. Some of his pieces were written for official university ceremonies.
