= Harmondsworth =

Village in Greater London, England

Coordinates: 51.4865°N 0.4796°W

- Village
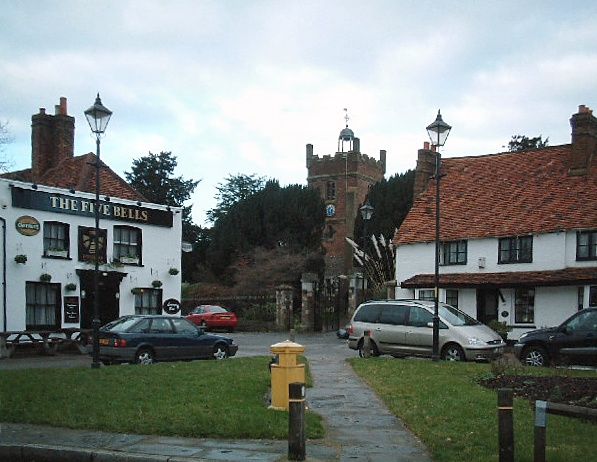
- Harmondsworth Village

- Location within Greater London
- Population: 1,478 – 2011 census
- OS grid reference: TQ055775
  - Charing Cross: 15 mi (24 km) E by NE
- London borough: Hillingdon
- Ceremonial county: Greater London
- Region: London
- Country: England
- Sovereign state: United Kingdom
- Post town: WEST DRAYTON
- Postcode district: UB7
- Dialling code: 020
- Police: Metropolitan
- Fire: London
- Ambulance: London
- UK Parliament: Hayes and Harlington
- London Assembly: Ealing and Hillingdon

Harmondsworth is a village in the London Borough of Hillingdon in the county of Greater London with a short border to the south onto London Heathrow Airport and close to the Berkshire county border. The village has no railway stations, but adjoins the M4 motorway and the A4 road (the Bath Road). Harmondsworth was in the historic county of Middlesex until 1965. It is an ancient parish that once included the large hamlets of Heathrow, Longford and Sipson. Longford and Sipson have modern signposts and facilities as separate villages, remaining to a degree interdependent such as for schooling. The Great Barn and parish church are medieval buildings in the village. The largest proportion of land in commercial use is related to air transport and hospitality. The village includes public parkland with footpaths and abuts the River Colne and biodiverse land in its Regional Park to the west, once the grazing meadows and woodlands used for hogs of Colnbrook.

The west of the parish has two major airline headquarters (international and local) and two immigration detention centres: the larger is for a maximum of 620 men without leave (permission) to enter or remain in the United Kingdom. Many international visitors stay within the church-based bounds of Harmondsworth, as all hotels are branded as "Heathrow", a former hamlet and other farmsteads that were absorbed by the airport.

In October 2016 it was announced by the government that Heathrow Airport would receive permission to apply for a third runway. According to current expansion plans, around half of the existing village of Harmondsworth will have to be demolished to make way for the north-west runway and surrounding grass safety area. The other half, including the parish church and Great Barn, will be only a few metres from the airport perimeter.

== History ==
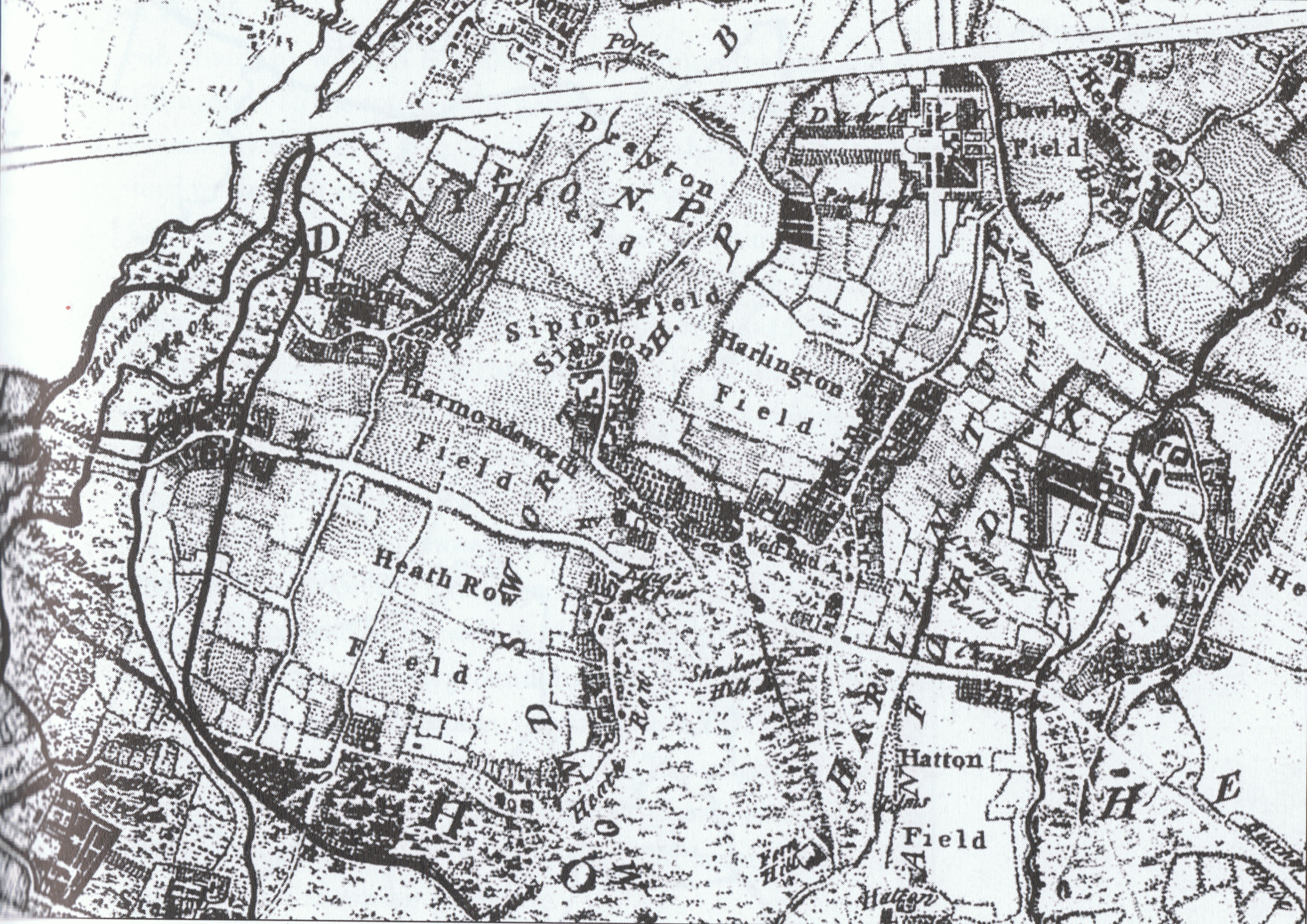
Detail of A Map of the County of Middlesex Reduced from an Actual Survey in four Sheets By John Rocque or Carte de la Province de Middlesex reduite D'apres un arpanlage en quatre feuilles Par Jean Rocque, 1757.

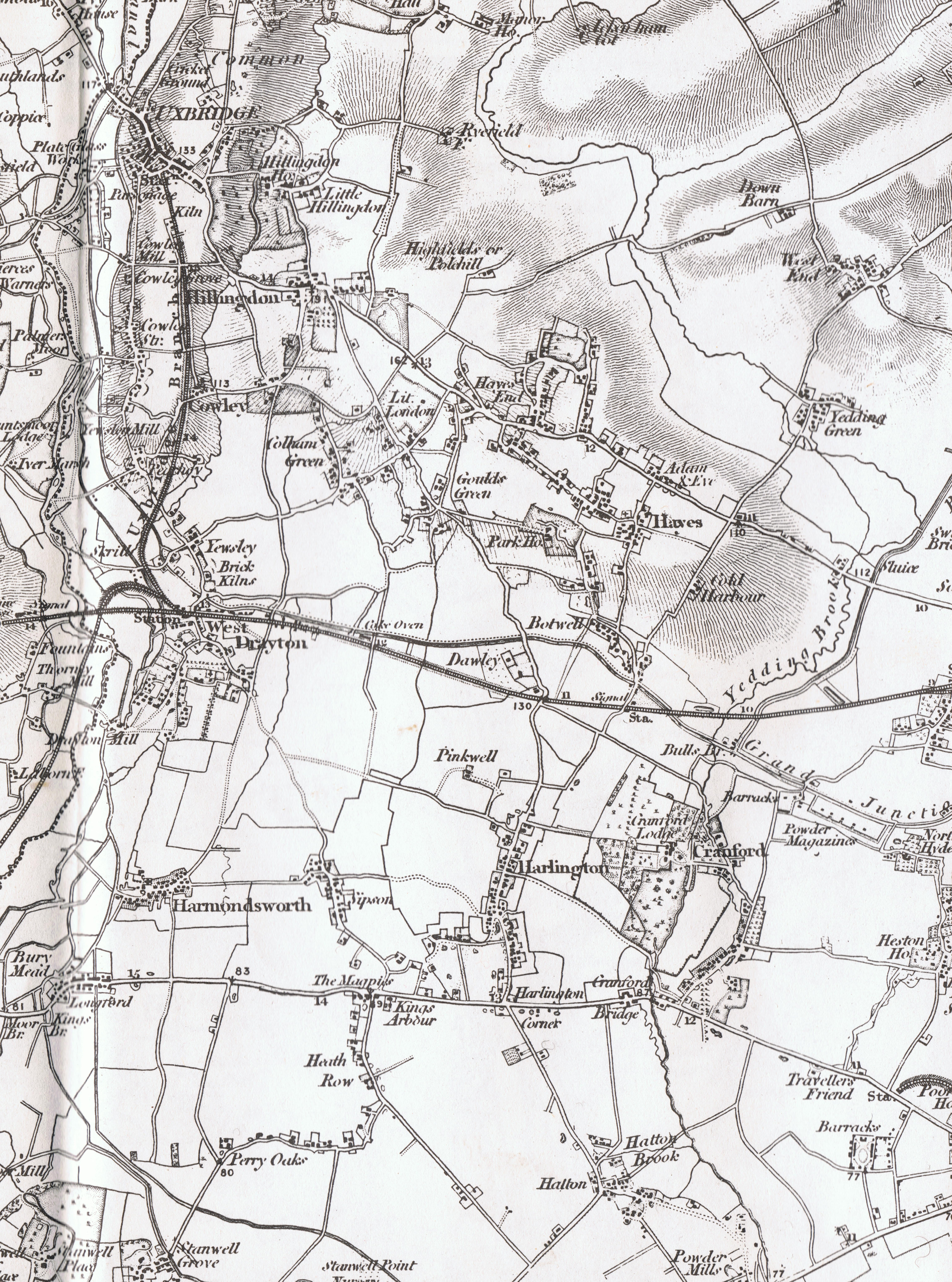
Harmondsworth as seen on Ordnance Survey map sheet 71, 1822–1890, with railway added 1891.

Harmondsworth is mentioned in Domesday Book, its name coming from the Anglo-Saxon Heremōdes worþ, meaning "Heremōd's enclosure", or Heremundes worþ, meaning "Heremund's enclosure".

Harmondsworth remains an ecclesiastical parish, with the name first recorded in AD 780 when King Offa granted land to his servant Aeldred.

Before 1066 the manor was owned by Harold Godwinson (Earl Harold), and at the Conquest (1066) it passed to William I. In 1069 it was granted by the king, on the suggestion of William FitzOsbern, 1st Earl of Hereford (c. 1020 – 1071), to the Benedictine Abbey of Holy Trinity, Rouen, afterwards known as St. Catherine's, which held it in 1086 and then until 1391.

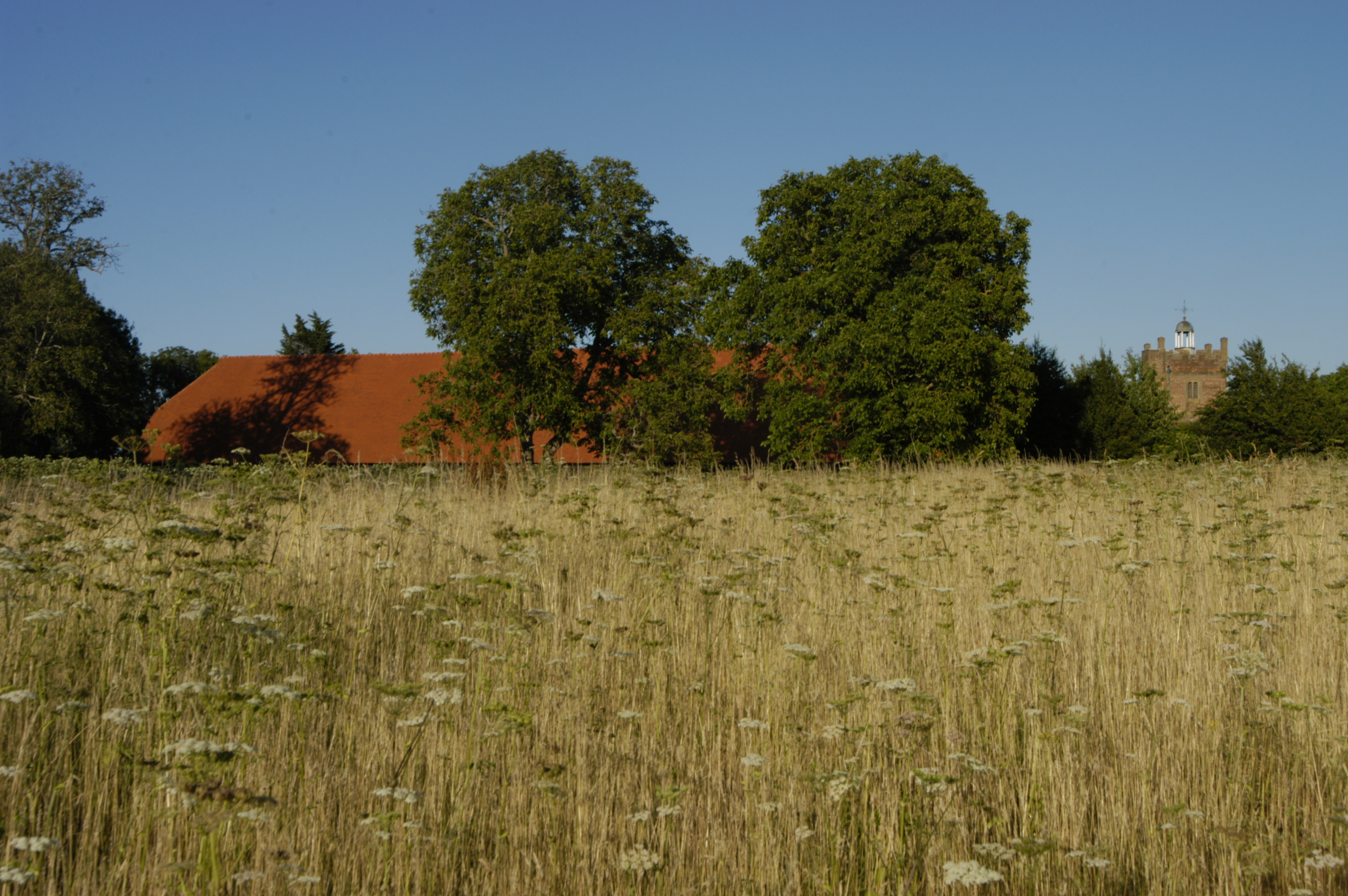
The Great Barn, 19 July 2015, from the west, showing its new roof and the church tower on the right.

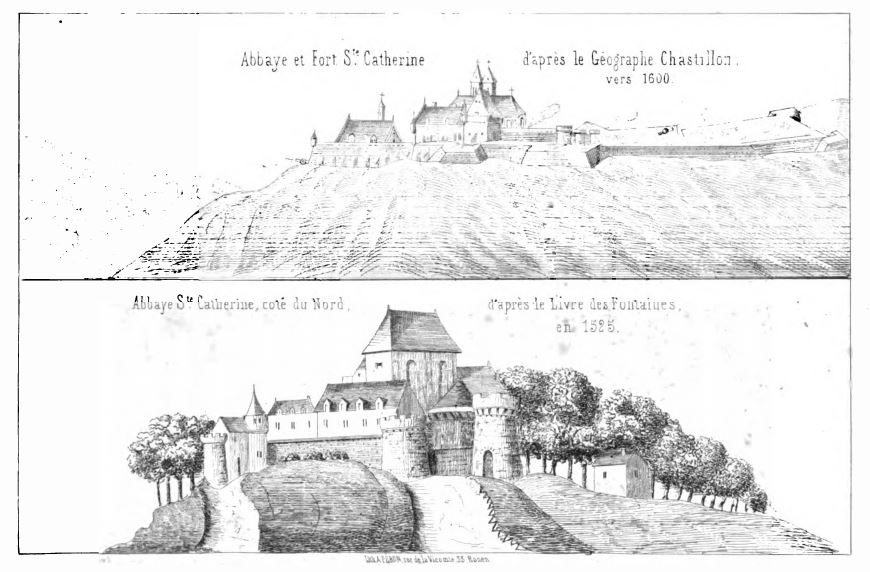
Owner from 1069: Abbaye Sainte-Catherine du Mont, or Abbey of the Holy Trinity and Saint Katherine, at Rouen in Normandy.

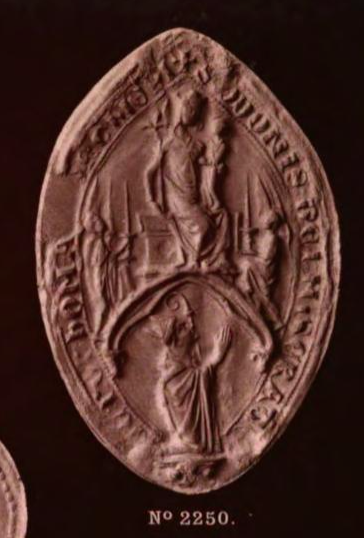
Seal of Eudes Rigaud or Odo Rigaldus (c.1200–1275), the Archbishop of Rouen, who visited the priory at Harmondsworth in 1265 and 1268 and recorded only two monks in the priory.

HARMONDSWORTH (Virgin Mary), a parish, in the union of Staines...Middlesex, 2½ miles (E. by N.) from Colnbrook; containing 1330 inhabitants. The living is a vicarage, with that of West Drayton united, net income, £530; patron, H. De Burgh, Esq...The church has a Norman door, and a tower with angular turrets, On Hounslow heath, in the parish, is a square intrenchment, each side measuring 100 yards, supposed to have been the work of Caesar in his war with Cassivelaunus. A Topographical Dictionary of England

— S. Lewis, 1848

The manor and advowson (this grant did not include the knight's fees held in the king's hands nor the property farmed out by the priory), together with those of Tingewick (Buckinghamshire), were acquired from the abbey and prior in 1391 by William of Wykeham, Bishop of Winchester, and formed part of the endowment of Winchester College and New College, Oxford, aka St. Mary College of Winchester in Oxford. Winchester College and New College retained the manor until 1543 when it was surrendered to Henry VIII in exchange for property elsewhere.

In 1547 the lordship and manor was granted to William Paget, 1st Baron Paget, KG, PC. The Pagets held on to the manor until the eighteenth century, selling most of early during the time of the heir of Henry Paget, 2nd Earl of Uxbridge (1719–1769), Henry Bayley-Paget, 1st Earl of Uxbridge (1744–1812). William, Lord Paget (1609–1678) sold some of it in 1672. Via his daughter Penelope Foley the Pagets were ancestors of Charles Darwin.

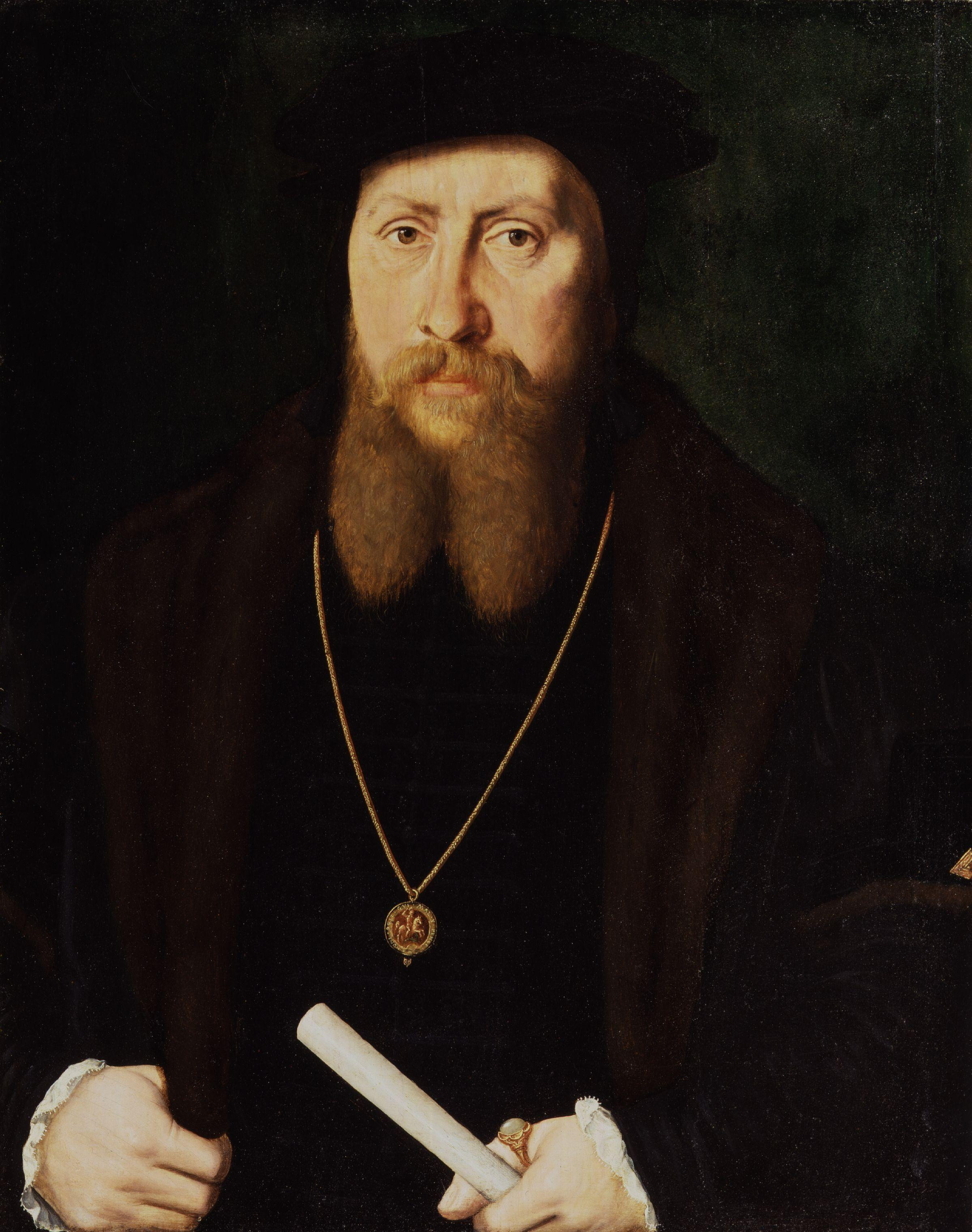
William Paget, granted the lordship and manor in 1547.

Harmondsworth as an ancient parish of 30 hides (as assessed at Domesday, 1086) or 3,480 acres (14.1 km^{2}) (rather than today's surviving village nucleus) changed from agrarian and a few, isolated London suburban homes to mostly industrial gradually in 1929 with the opening of the Colnbrook by-pass which by-passed diminutive Longford to the north.

Harmondsworth civil parish from its 1880s creation until its 1964 abolition contained the same areas as its religious counterpart. Industrial development began in 1930 with the opening of the Road Research Laboratory (RRL) on this road. In the same year, the Fairey Aviation Company opened an airfield, the Great West Aerodrome, south-west of Heathrow. This formed the nucleus of the later airport, and the Fairey hangar was eventually incorporated into Heathrow Airport as a fire station.

By the late 1930s some residential building had taken place, although almost entirely in the northern half of the parish. Small estates were built off Hatch Lane around Candover Close and Zealand Avenue and further building took place along Sipson Road, around Blunts Avenue, and along the north side of the Bath Road at Sipson Green. Longford remained virtually untouched. A brick-works was established by the corner of Cain's Lane and Heathrow Road and the area of former heathland was extensively worked for gravel, sand, and grit. In the 1930s Middlesex County Council opened a large sewage pumping station to the west of Perry Oaks, which was converted to Heathrow Terminal 5 in the early 21st century. The Great South West Road touched the south-east corner of the parish but played no part in its development. Although many of the orchards survived, their numbers had been greatly reduced and it seems probable that much of the former fruit-growing area was being used for market gardening. In 1944 Harmondsworth and Sipson retained their agricultural character despite some suburban housing. It was then suggested that further expansion in the Yiewsley and West Drayton area should be curtailed, as the land was primarily in demand for agriculture, which was greatly adhered to until 1971.

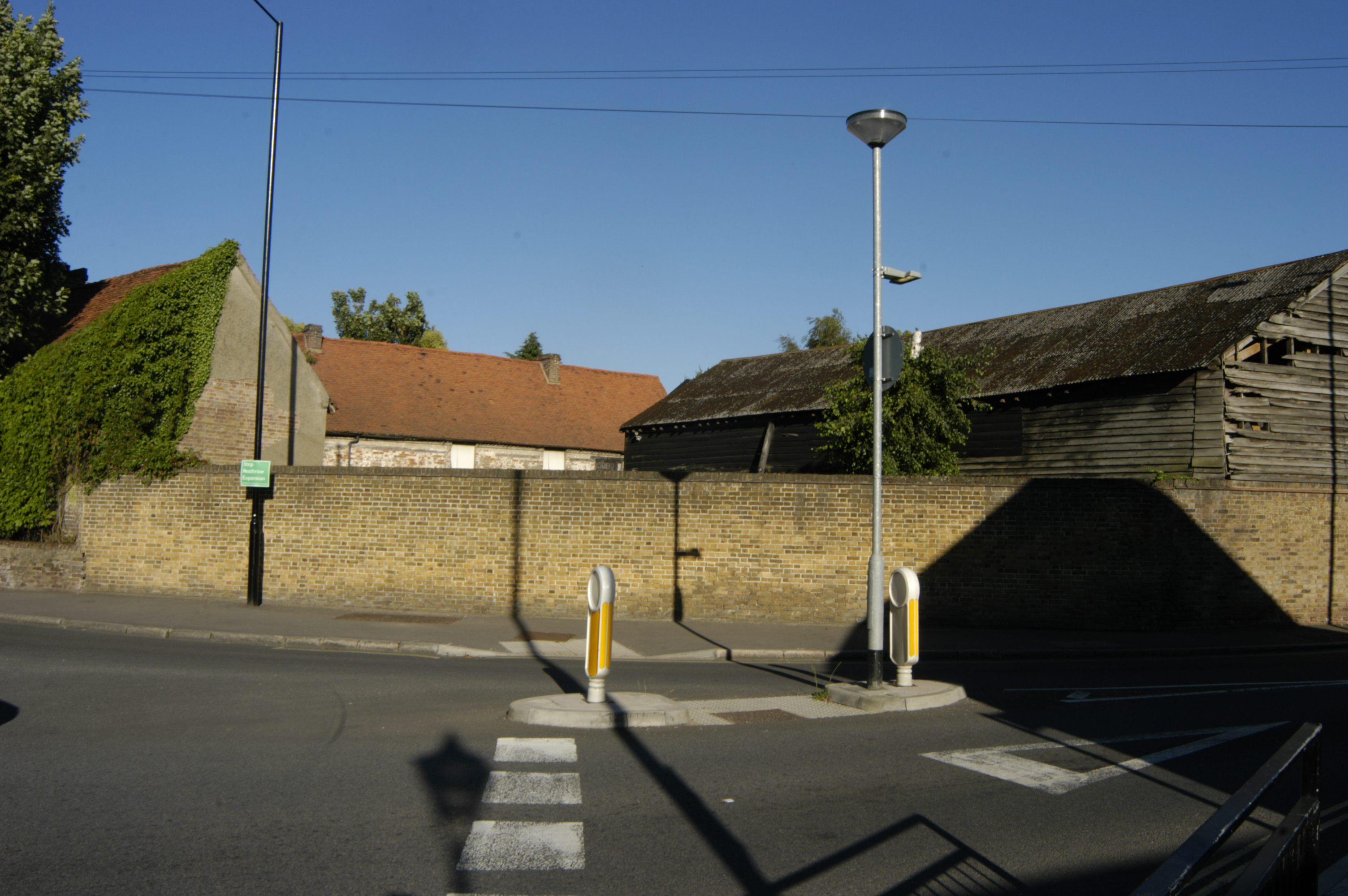
Farm buildings at the eastern end of Harmondsworth, July 2015.

In 1944, however, the modern pattern of Harmondsworth began to emerge with the transfer of the Fairey airfield to the Royal Air Force and its subsequent development by the Air Ministry as Heathrow RAF station. This entailed the complete demolition of Heathrow and Perry Oaks hamlets, and widespread draining of the old flooded gravel pits. Many of the small buildings along the south side of the Bath Road that were still standing in 1960 were erected by the RAF.

Although not a post town, in printed form Harmondsworth is frequently seen in books. From 1937 the offices and warehouses of Penguin Books were here until their gradual closure in the 1990s. In this period its books published in the country bore the publication location, "Harmondsworth, Middlesex".

In 1965 it became part of the London Borough of Hillingdon in the newly formed ceremonial county of Greater London.

== Proceedings of court, 26 July 1245 ==
Record of proceedings in the Church of Pinnore [Pinner], before the Dean of Middlesex, and Baldric, Chaplain acting on behalf of the Priors of Benetleye [Bentley] and Hermodesworth [Harmondsworth], in the cause between the Abbot and Convent of Bec, by Peter de Suynecumbe, Proctor, and John de Bleddel also Proctor for the Abbey of Bec [ Bec Herluin ] and the Rector of the Church of Great Wrothing [Great Wratting] by Master Henry de Trippeleawe his Proctor, and the Prior and Convent of Doure [Dover]. Question of certain proctorial letters received without seal of Prior, or Prior's name; necessary clause also deficient in them: decision that Prior of Doure pay all expenses.

== Henry III Fine Rolls ==
Fine rolls of Henry III.

- (13 January 1250): "For the abbot of Rouen. The abbot of Sainte-Trinité-du-mont-de-Rouen gives the king £10 for having seisin of the manor of Harmondsworth after the death of the abbot of the same place, his predecessor."
- (18 January 1250): 18 January Westminster. "For the abbot of Sainte-Trinité-du-mont-de-Rouen. By a fine of £10 which the abbot of Sainte-Trinité-du-mont-de-Rouen has made with him, the king has rendered to him the manors of Tingewick in Buckinghamshire and Harmondsworth in Middlesex, which the king caused to be taken into his hand by reason of the death of William, formerly abbot of the same place, predecessor of the aforesaid abbot. Order to Henry of Wingham and his co-escheators in the aforesaid counties to cause the aforesaid abbot to have full seisin of the aforesaid manors together with the issues received in the meantime."
- (24 June 1271): 24 June Westminster. "Concerning a fine for the abbot of St Katherine's Rotom'. The king, by a fine of ten marks which the abbot of St. Katherine's de monte Rotomagen' has made with the king, has rendered the manors of Tingewik in Buckinghamshire and Harmondsworth in Middlesex which were taken into the king’s hand by reason of the death of Robert sometime abbot of the same place predecessor of the aforesaid abbot. Order to Master Richard de Clifford', escheator this side of the Trent, to cause the same abbot to have full seisin without delay of the aforesaid manors together with everything taken therefrom."

== Priors of the alien priory of S. Catherine du Mont, Harmondsworth ==
- William, occurs 1260
- John de Walemond, occurs 1276
- Richard, occurs 1279
- William de Bosco alias de Yvelont, occurs 1297
- John de Ibelound
- Humphrey le Conte-Poyntour, occurs 1317
- John de Fraunkevyle, occurs 1321
- William de Pestlamore, occurs 1329
- John Busot(is)
- Roger Sorel, occurs 1342, 1345; recently dead in 1351
- John Cibe, occurs 1351;
- Robert Beauchamp (Bello Campo), occurs 1352; 'late prior' in 1392

In 1390 William of Wykeham, Bishop of Winchester, secured both papal and royal authority to acquire the lands of alien priories for his colleges, and in the following year he obtained from Richard II a licence for St. Catherine's Abbey to sell him all its possessions in England, apart from the Priory of Blyth. These possessions comprised the manor of Harmondsworth with the advowson of the church and vicarage, the manor of Tingewick with its advowson, the advowsons of Saham Toney and St. Leonard's, and certain yearly pensions. The Bishop sent a member of his household, Richard Altryncham, to Rouen to negotiate with the abbey and convent about this buying of the priory as an endowment for his colleges. A sale was agreed on 15 October 1391, the price being fixed at 8,400 gold francs, which were paid in 1392 through a firm of Genoese bankers. The bishop also undertook to provide for the prior Robert Beauchamp and for John le Cellier, his companion, all such things in the way of wine, food, clothing, and lodging as befitted religious of their estate for the rest of their lives. He would also furnish a chapel for the abbey. The Harmondsworth property, centred on the priory which stood to the west of Manor Farm and the tithe barn, thus became part of the endowment of his two colleges at Winchester and Oxford.

== Church ==
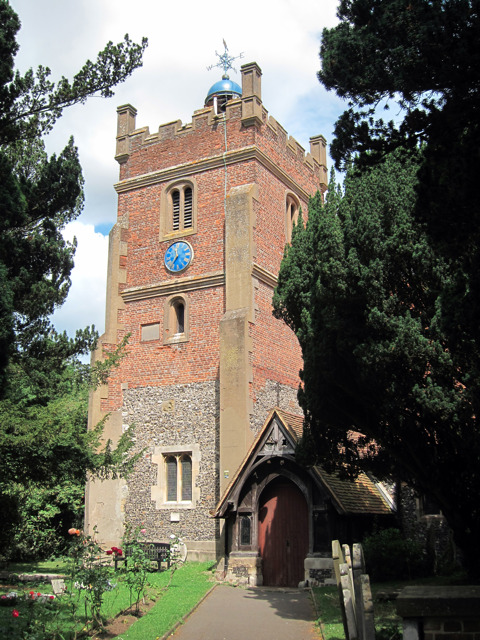
Church of St Mary

The historic parish church of Harmondsworth is the church of St Mary, of which parts date from the 12th century. There is an opinion that Heathrow Airport is legally responsible for maintaining this church's chancel, because the airport now owns land (formerly in Heathrow village) which in 1819 at the enclosing of the commons had been assigned in lieu of tithes used to maintain the chancel.

Some Harmondsworth clergy:

- 1437–1440† Richard Wyche (burned at the stake for Lollard heresy)
- 1511–1515 John Edmunds
- 1594–1623† Leonard Davies (also Sub-Dean of the Chapel Royal)
- 1628–1650† Emanuel Hodges
- 1664–1697† John Jenney
- 1698–1714† John Bush
- 1714–1727† Thomas Fyson
- 1727–1760† John Lidgould
- 1760–1764† William Rayner
- 1764–1772 William Harvest
- 1772–1779 Charles Jeffreys Cottrell
- 1779–1786 Robert Burt (Chaplain to George, Prince of Wales; officiated at his secret marriage to Maria Fitzherbert in 1785)
- 1786–1796 John Hubbard
- 1796–1808† John Theodosius Langhorne (son of the poet John Langhorne)
- 1809–1843† Frederick Tomkins
- 1844–1866 Robert Lill De Burgh
- 1866–1874† James Percy Arnold
- 1874–1875† John Hitchcock
- 1875–1879 Henry Worsley
- 1878–1882 Thomas Curling Lewis
- 1882–1916 John Charles Taylor
- 1916–1924† William Bellett Sealy

† Vicar died in post

== Great Barn ==
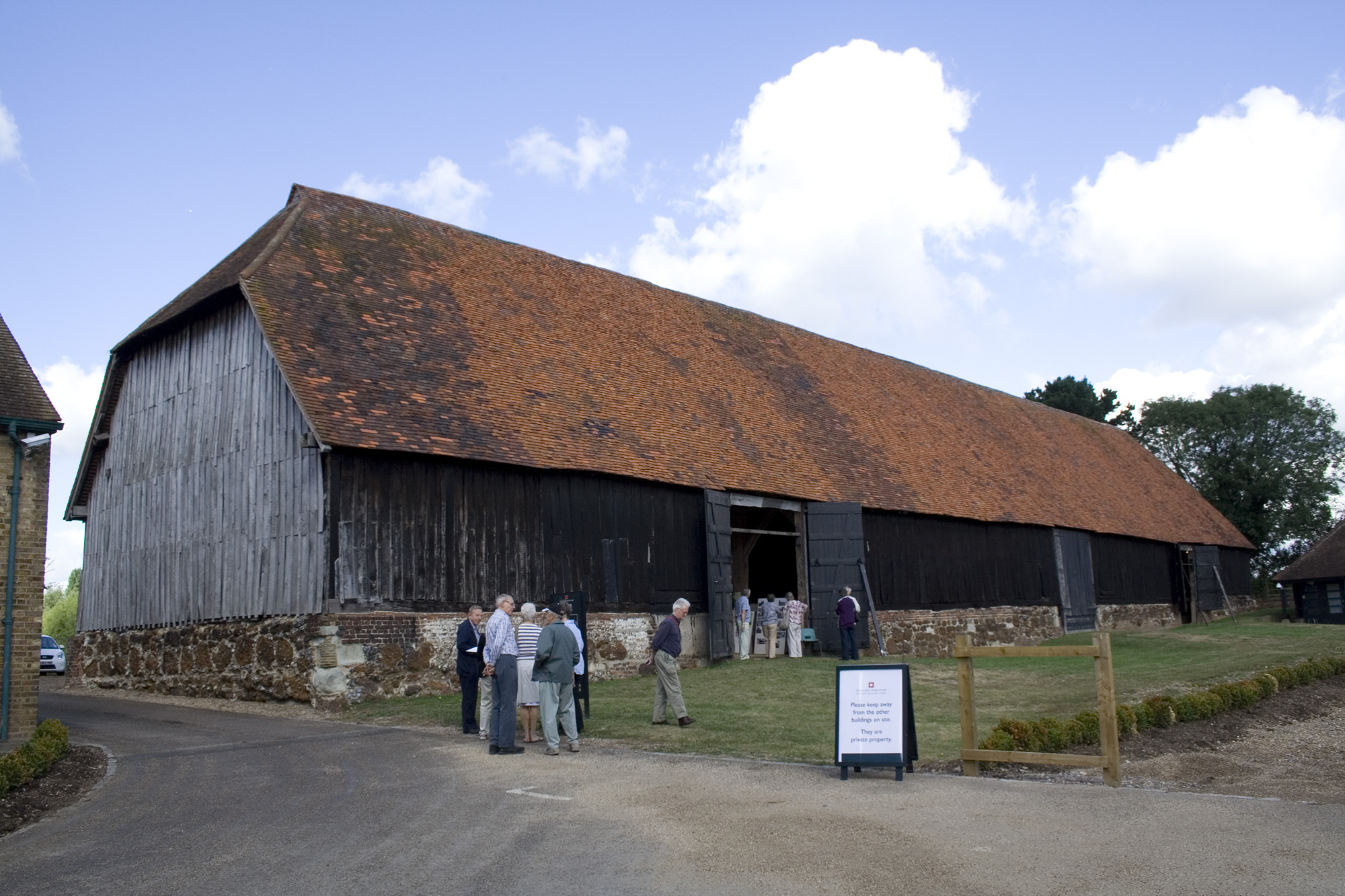
The Great Barn in Harmondsworth, dating back to the 14th or 15th century

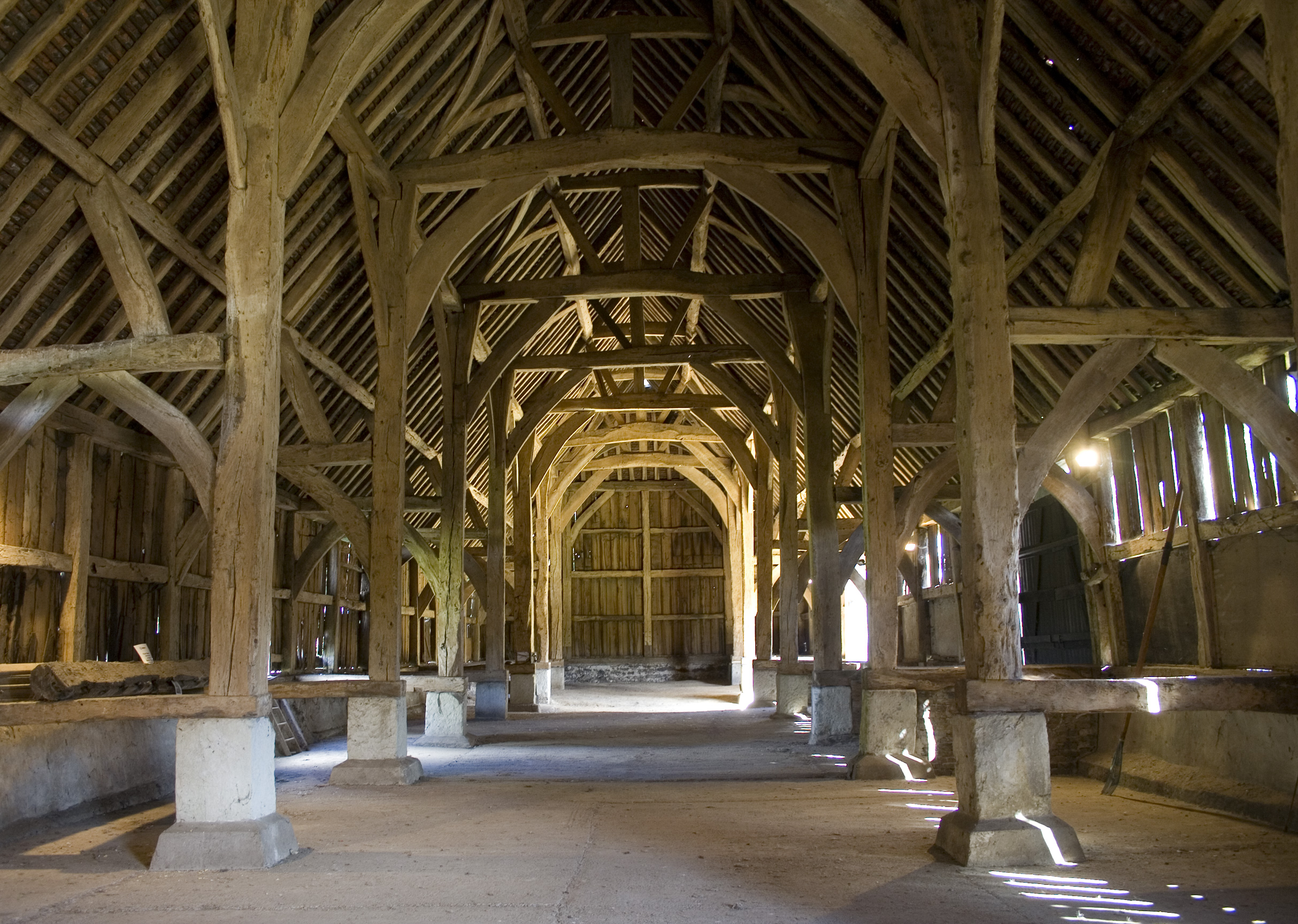
Interior of the Great Barn looking north

The other notable historic building in Harmondsworth is the Grade I-listed Harmondsworth Great Barn, Britain's largest barn. On the site of an earlier great barn, it was put up between 1425 and 1427 on land bought by William of Wykeham, Bishop of Winchester, in 1391, to endow his colleges Winchester College and New College, Oxford. It is the largest extant timber-framed building in England and was described by the English poet John Betjeman as the "Cathedral of Middlesex". As of January 2012 the barn is owned by English Heritage.

A similar barn, built 25 years later in 1451–53, but shorter (with eight bays as opposed to the Harmondsworth barn's 12), is at Old Burghclere, Hampshire. This monumental barn was also built on land acquired by William of Wykeham. While the Harmondsworth barn was part of Winchester College's endowment the Burghclere barn passed to the family of Fiennes who had married the heiress of Wykeham's great-nephew heir. It now is part of the Highclere estate belonging to Lord Carnarvon.

== Government ==
=== Local government ===
- 1894: Rural districts brought in. Harmondsworth civil parish, created in the 1870s was put in Staines Rural District.
- 1930: Harmondsworth civil parish was transferred to Yiewsley and West Drayton Urban District.
- At the 1931 census (one of the last before the abolition of the parish), Harmondsworth had a population of 3084.
- 1949: Harmondsworth civil parish was merged with Yiewsley and West Drayton.
- 1965: Middlesex county was abolished. Yiewsley and West Drayton was transferred to the London Borough of Hillingdon, in Greater London.
- Harmondsworth forms a minority of the Heathrow Villages ward (2008-date), which elects three councillors to Hillingdon London Borough Council and had a population of 12,199 in 2011.

=== United Kingdom government ===
There are two UK Border Agency immigration removal centres in Harmondsworth: Colnbrook Immigration Removal Centre and Harmondsworth Immigration Removal Centre.

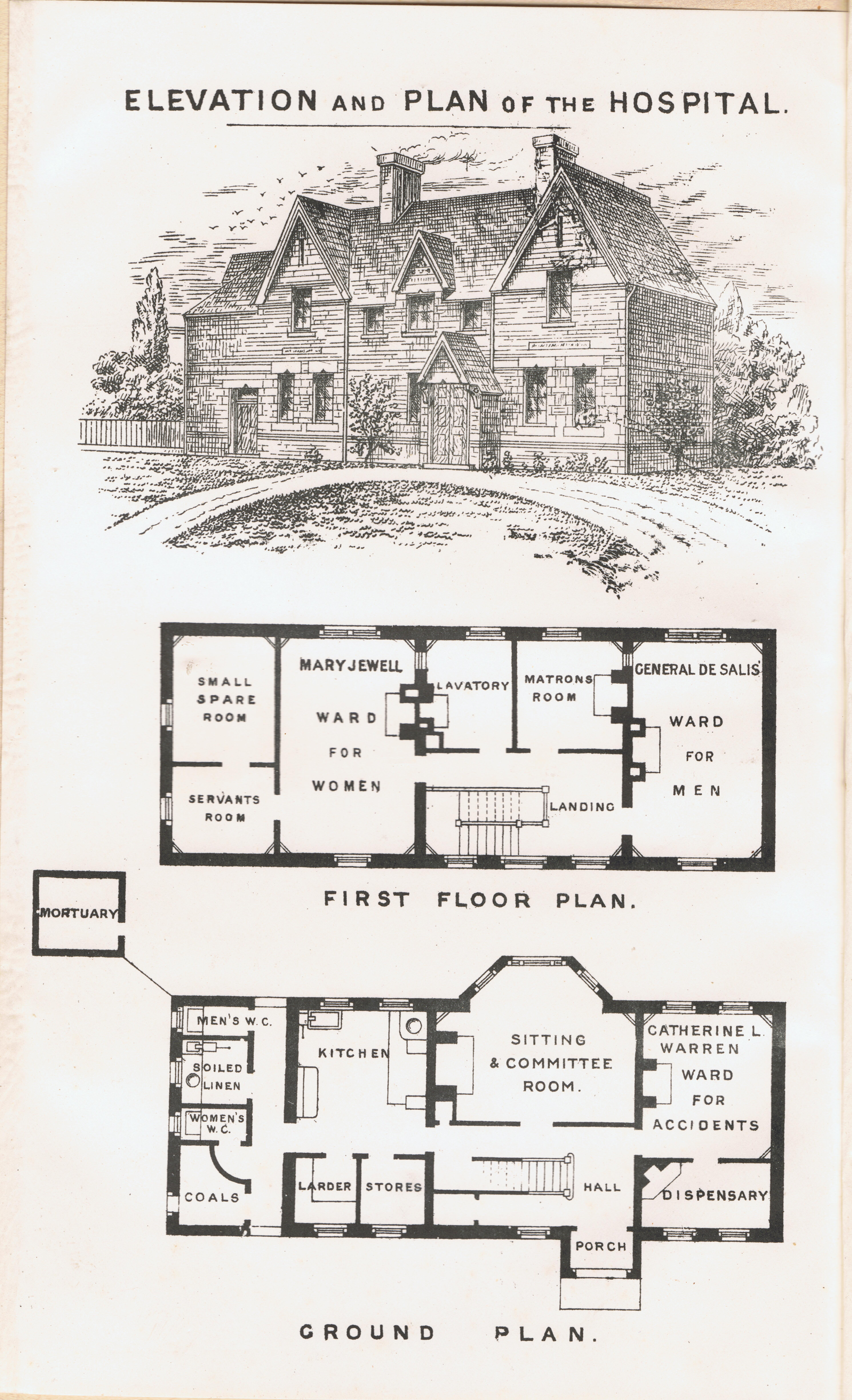
Harlington, Harmondsworth and Cranford Cottage Hospital, founded 1884.

== Cottage Hospital ==
The Harlington, Harmondsworth and Cranford Cottage Hospital was established in 1884 and opened in 1885. It was halfway between Harmondsworth and Cranford on the Sipson Road, about four furlongs west of Harlington.

== Economy ==
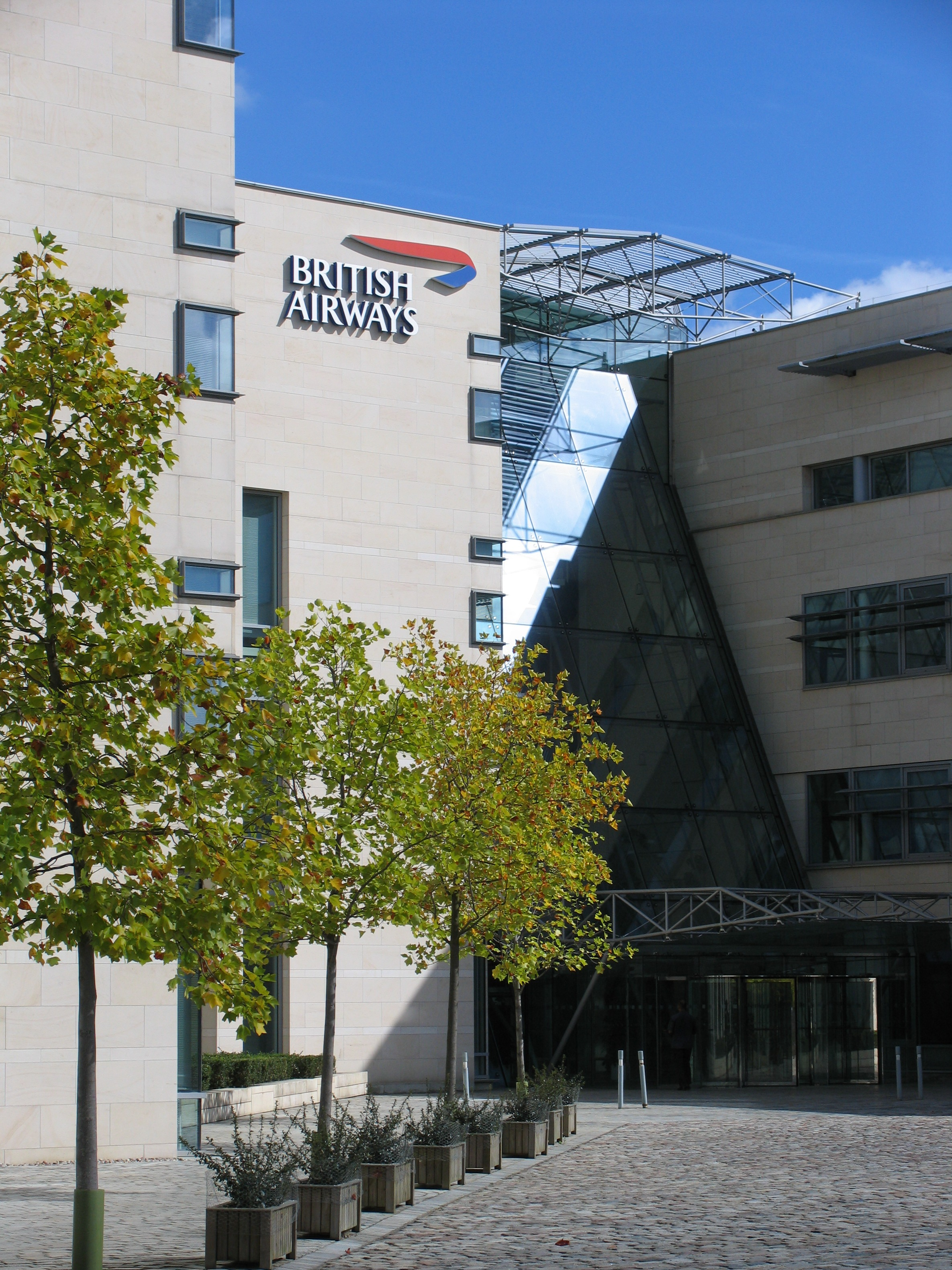
Waterside, the headquarters of British Airways

British Airways is headquartered in Waterside in Harmondsworth. The building officially opened in 1998. An office of American Airlines occupies Orient House, Waterside.

Harmondsworth has two pubs: The Crown and the Five Bells.

The village was formerly home to Penguin Books, from 1937.

== Education ==
Harmondsworth Primary School is in Harmondsworth.

== Transport ==
The area is served by various buses and by West Drayton railway station centred 2 miles (3.2 km) north, across the M4 motorway. The Bath Road (A4) is the predecessor to this route and passes through the village with junctions in the neighbouring villages leading to the M4 motorway.

Arable farmland between Harmondsworth and Heathrow airport, Middlesex, July 2015.

The tower of the church of St Mary, Harmondsworth, July 2015.

== Demography ==
The area comprises well-populated and scarcely populated areas but which have differing constitutions as to the buildings in which people live and stay: hotels, homes and the two immigration control institutions (in the east and north census output areas). Thus the population fluctuates to a greater or lesser extent, dependent on land use.

2011 Census statistics
Part	Population on date of census	Area in km^{2}
Centre and east	354	0.124
North	341	0.012
West	319	0.021
South: includes 25% of Heathrow Airport	464	0.422
Total	1478	0.589

== Some people associated with Harmondsworth ==
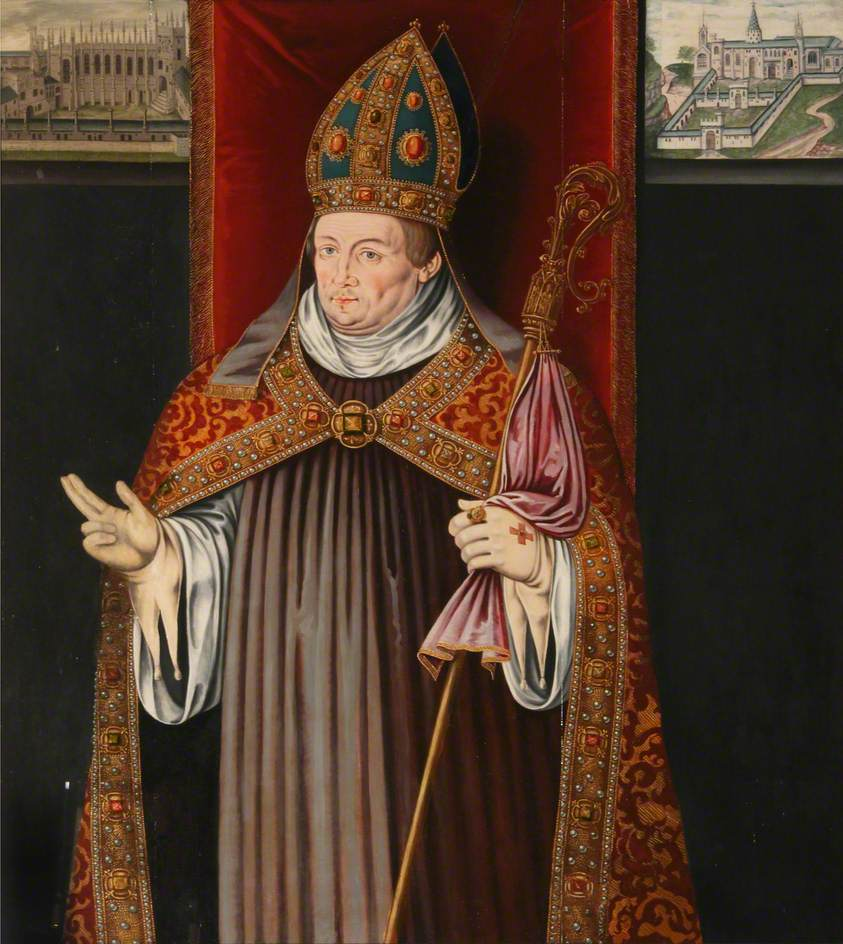
William of Wykeham, as imagined by Sampson Strong (c.1550–1611), oil on panel, 50 x 40 inches. New College, Oxford.

Shield of William of Wykeham. Argent two cheverons sable between three roses gules.

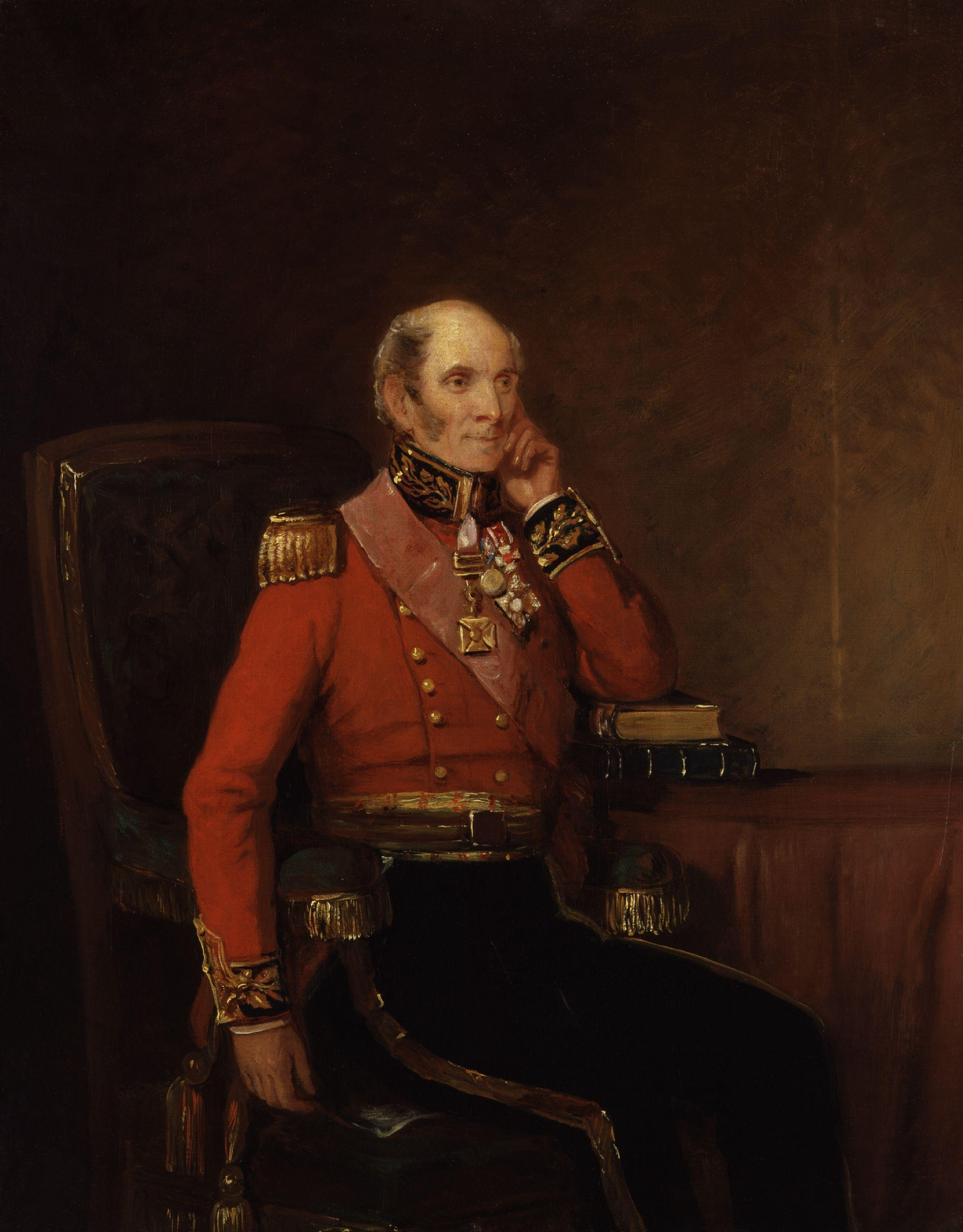
Baron Strafford, of Harmondsworth, in the county of Middlesex (1772–1860) by William Salter.

- Offa of Mercia, 780 AD, Hermonds (Harmondsworth) granted by Offa, King of Mercia, to his servant Aeldred
- Harold Godwinson (Earl Harold or Harold II) (killed 1066), the last Anglo-Saxon king of England
- William FitzOsbern, 1st Earl of Hereford (c. 1020 – 1071), advised King William I to grant Harmondsworth to an abbey in Rouen, the then capital of Normanandy
- William of Wykeham (1320 or 1324–1404), Bishop of Winchester and Chancellor of England, bought Harmondsworth in 1391
- Godfrey atte Perry, of Harmondsworth, MP for Middlesex, 1383 and 1388
- William Paget, 1st Baron Paget, KG, PC, Lord Privy Seal, granted lordship and manor of Harmondsworth in 1547
- Sir Philip Hoby (1505–1558), the king leased him Longford mills for 60 years
- Sir Thomas Paston, bought Hoby's interest in the Longford mill in 1548
- Thomas Paget, 3rd Baron Paget, attainted in 1587
- Sir Christopher Hatton (1540–1591), KG, on third Lord Paget's attainder manor leased to Hatton by Queen Elizabeth I, 1587
- William Paget, 4th Baron Paget, granted Harmondsworth and West Drayton in fee in 1597, and in blood 1604
- William Paget, 5th Baron Paget (1609–1678)
- William Paget, 6th Baron Paget
- Henry Paget, 1st Earl of Uxbridge
- Elizabeth, Dowager Countess of Uxbridge (1674–1749), (daughter of Sir Walter Bagot, 3rd Baronet), in 1747 she gave £100 stock to the parish to be distributed to ten poor families who did not receive parish relief, no one family receiving more than 10 shillings a year
- Thomas Paget, Lord Paget (1689–1742)
- Henry, Lord Paget, later Earl of Uxbridge, his heir sold Harmondsworth rectory 1772 and the barn 1774
- Henry Bayley-Paget, 1st Earl of Uxbridge (1744–1812)
- Field Marshal Henry Paget, 1st Marquess of Anglesey (1768–1854), KG, GCB, GCH, PC
- Henry Paget, 2nd Marquess of Anglesey, sold the manor
- William Heather (c.1563–1627), musician, founder of Heather Professor of Music, Oxford
- Hugh Percy, 1st Duke of Northumberland (c.1714–1786), KG, PC, and others, owners of the Duke of Northumberland's River
- Sir William Heathcote, 3rd Baronet (1746–1819), owned Harmondsworth rectory 1772–1789
- George Byng, MP
- Baron Strafford, of Harmondsworth, in the county of Middlesex (1772–1860), (aka Field Marshal John Byng, 1st Earl of Strafford, GCB, GCH, PC)
- Richard Cox (c.1766–1845), breeder of Cox's Orange Pippin
- Henry Smith of Harmondsworth Hall, in 1875 he bequeathed £300 to be given to the poor in blankets. In 1958 The Blanket Charity the charity income amounted to over £7, from which six blankets were purchased
- Thomas Wild (1848–1932), of Wild & Robbins, market gardener (1931 growing: "cabbages lettuce leeks kale spinach broccoli New Zealand spinach rhubarb chokes potatoes beet greens Brussels [sprouts] onions marrows parsnips"
- Rowland Richard Robbins (Dick) (1872–1960), CBE, JP, market gardener, President of the National Farmers' Union (NFU)
- Lionel Robbins (1898–1984) (Baron Robbins, CH, CB, FBA), economist;
- Caroline Robbins (1903–1999), historian
- Norman Macmillan (1892–1976), OBE, MC, AFC, DL
- Sir Charles Richard Fairey (1887–1956), MBE, of Fairey Aviation Company, founded the airport at Heathrow in 1930
- Sir John Betjeman, CBE (1906–1984), called the 1426 Great Barn the cathedral of Middlesex.

== Notable buildings ==
Name	Type	Built	Occupant	Demolished?	Current use
Harmondsworth Great Barn	Barn	Early 15th century		No	
Manor Farm	Farmhouse	Early 19th century		No	Farm until the early 1970s, then offices
Harmondsworth Hall	House	Early 18th century		No	Home and hotel
The Grange	House	From 1675		No	Offices
The Lodge	House	Early 19th century		No	Domestic until the early 1960s, then offices

== Memorials ==
=== Royal Canadian Air Force aircrew memorial ===
Situated on Harmondsworth Moor there is a stone of remembrance dedicated to the seven crew members of Handley Page Halifax Mk V DK253 ZL-M of 427 Squadron Royal Canadian Air Force based at RAF Leeming in Yorkshire, who died in the early hours of 16 September 1943 after the aircraft crashed on the moor. It was returning from a mission to the Dunlop rubber factory at Montlucan, an industrial town in central France 175 miles south of Paris.

The inscription on the stone of remembrance reads:
Harmondsworth Moor. At this site on 16 September 1943, an RCAF Halifax bomber crashed on return from a mission, with the loss of all seven crew members. This memorial is to all those who served in 427 Squadron, and in 6 Bomber Group RCAF. Dedicated on 7 July 1999 by British Airways, in association with the Community of Harmondsworth. United in Service.

- Crew of 427 Squadron Royal Canadian Air Force Halifax DK253
- Flying Officer Kendall B. Begbie RCAF of Riverside, Ontario. Aged 26 years
- Flying Officer Frederick V. Webb RCAF of Vancouver, British Columbia. Aged 27 years.
- Flight Sergeant Alexander Chibanoff RCAF of Glendon, Alberta. Aged 22 years.
- Sergeant Harold W. Frost RCAF of Toronto, Ontario. Aged 20 years.
- Sergeant Alfred R. J. Gaiger RAF (VR) of Alderley Edge, Cheshire. Aged 27 years
- Sergeant Eric T. Potts RAF (VR) of Knaresborough, Yorkshire. Aged 22 years.
- Sergeant David R. Coe RAF (VR) of Dersingham, Norfolk. Aged 19 years.

Road Research Laboratory - Sir Barnes Wallis memorial

=== Road Research Laboratory / Sir Barnes Neville Wallis memorial ===
On Moor Lane there is a memorial to the Road Research Laboratory (RRL) and Sir Barnes Wallis. The Road Research Laboratory had been established at Harmondsworth in 1933. Its main buildings were situated off the Colnbrook by-pass with a test track running north to Moor Lane. It was in this area near Moor Lane that a test site for dam models was located.

Barnes Wallis approached the RRL in October 1940 to discuss the possibility of attacking enemy dams, including the Möhne Dam. A team was set up at the RRL under Dr. A. R. Collins. A model dam was built at the Building Research Station at Garston which was used for the first set of test explosions, and was badly damaged by them. During 1941-42 a series of subsequent tests were carried out at Harmondsworth using 'simplified' versions of the model dam which were cast in concrete. From the results of these tests Dr. Collins concluded that to breach the full-scale Möhne dam 7,000Ib (3,400kgs) of explosive would be required, detonated 30 feet (9m) below the water level and against the inside face of the dam. These conclusions were applied by Barnes Wallis in his development of the Upkeep bouncing bomb used by 617 Squadron to breach the Ruhr dams on 16/17 May 1943.
