= Arthur Phillips (musician) =

English musician and composer

Arthur Phillips (1605 – 27 March 1695) was an English musician and composer. He was organist of Magdalen College, Oxford, and Heather Professor of Music at the University of Oxford. He converted to Catholicism and resigned his positions in 1656 to travel to France to become organist to Queen Henrietta Maria, widow of the executed King Charles I.

== Life and career ==
Arthur Phillips, from Winchester, Hampshire, was admitted to New College, Oxford, aged 17 in 1622. He was appointed organist of Magdalen College, Oxford, in 1639 (following an appointment as organist of Bristol Cathedral the previous year) and gained his Bachelor of Music degree in 1640. He succeeded Richard Nicholson as organist of Magdalen and also as Heather Professor of Music at the university, a position established in 1626 following a donation from William Heather.

Phillips joined the Catholic Church and resigned from his Oxford positions in 1656. He then travelled to France to serve as organist to Queen Henrietta Maria, widow of King Charles I (who had been executed in 1649). After the monarchy was restored in 1660, he returned to England to live in Harting, Sussex, where he owned some land; he died there on 27 March 1695.

== Compositions ==
Phillips wrote instrumental and vocal music. His surviving instrumental music, held in the Bodleian Library in Oxford, consists of some variations for keyboard, and some ensemble pieces. He set poems (including royalist poetry) and hymns to music, including "The Requiem, or, Liberty of an Imprisoned Royalist" (1641) by Thomas Pierce (another Magdalen student, who was a Fellow of Magdalen from 1643 until his expulsion by the Parliamentary visitation).
