= Richard Goodson (the younger) =

English organist, singer and academic

Richard Goodson (c.1688 – 1740 or 1741) was an English musician, who followed his father as Heather Professor of Music at the University of Oxford and organist of Christ Church Cathedral, Oxford.

== Life and career ==
Richard Goodson was baptised in 1688. His father (also called Richard Goodson) was at the time Heather Professor of Music at Oxford, and became also organist of Christ Church Cathedral, Oxford, in 1692. The son joined the cathedral choir in 1699 and left in 1707, becoming organist of the church at Newbury, Berkshire, in 1709. From 1712 to 1718, he was again a member of the cathedral choir, as one of the gentlemen singers. He matriculated at the university as a member of Christ Church, Oxford, in March 1713 and obtained his BMus degree in March 1717. His father died in 1718 and Goodson succeeded him as Heather Professor and organist of Christ Church. He died in late 1740 or early January 1741, and was buried at the cathedral on 7 January 1741. He gave his music library (which included copies of music that he and his father had made) to Christ Church in his will.
