= Beethoven: A Life in Nine Pieces =

Biographical book written by Laura Tunbridge

- Author: Laura Tunbridge
- Language: English
- Genre: Biography
- Published: 2020
- Publisher: Viking
- Publication place: United Kingdom
- Media type: Print, e-Book, audiobook
- Pages: 288
- ISBN: 978-0241414279

Beethoven: A Life in Nine Pieces is a biographical book written by Laura Tunbridge and published by Viking in 2020. Each chapter uses one of nine compositions of Ludwig van Beethoven in chronological order. The publishing year was intended to coincide with the 250th anniversary of the composer's birth.

== Compositions used in book chapters ==
- Septet in E♭ major, Op. 20 (1800)
- Violin Sonata No. 9, Op. 47 in A major (1803)
- Symphony No. 3 in E♭ major, Op. 55 (1804)
- Fantasy, Op. 80 (1808)
- An die Geliebte, WoO 140 (1812)
- Fidelio, Op. 72 (1814)
- Piano Sonata No. 29 in B♭ major, Op. 106 (Hammerklavier) (1818)
- Missa solemnis in D major, Op. 123 (1823)
- String Quartet No. 13 in B♭ major, Op. 130 (1826)

== Reception ==
The book received positive reviews from critics. The Guardian praised the book, adding that "in 288 pages, Tunbridge gives us detail enough to create a rounded portrait. She challenges, by example rather than theory, the presumption that Beethoven was curmudgeonly, friendless, loveless." The London Evening Standard called it "a rich accompaniment to [Beethoven's] music" and The Times called it thought-provoking.

== Publication ==
- Beethoven: A Life in Nine Pieces (2020) Viking Press ISBN 978-0241414279, Yale University Press ISBN 978-0300254587. 288 pages
