= Edward Lowe (composer) =

Organist and composer (c.1610–1682)

Edward Lowe (c.1610 – 11 July 1682) was an English musician, who was an organist at Christ Church Cathedral, Oxford, the Chapel Royal and the University of Oxford. He was also Heather Professor of Music at Oxford from 1661 until his death.

== Life and career ==
Edward Lowe was born in Salisbury, Wiltshire, and sang in the choir of Salisbury Cathedral as a boy at Salisbury Cathedral School. At some point between 1631 and 1641, he became organist and master of the choristers of Christ Church Cathedral, Oxford. Documents at the University of Oxford for the year 1657–58 record him as holding the position of university organist. He deputised for John Wilson as Heather Professor of Music, succeeding him in 1661; he also became an organist of the Chapel Royal soon afterwards. At Oxford, he increased the university's collection of music by purchases and by receiving gifts. He retained his various positions until his death on 11 July 1682. He was married twice: to Alice Peyton from 1633 until her death in 1649 (with whom he had nine children); and from about 1654 to Mary (with whom he had at least two children). He was buried in the cathedral, close to the grave of his first wife.

== Compositions and writings ==
In 1661, after the restoration of the monarchy, Lowe wrote a collection of simple settings of music for church and cathedral services, for the use of choirs newly reestablished after the end of the Commonwealth. He composed various pieces for Oxford occasions, including "Nunc est canendum" (possibly to mark the opening in 1669 of the Sheldonian Theatre), and for Christ Church; some vocal compositions and one work for keyboard also survive.
