= Harmondsworth Great Barn =

Grade I listed building in Harmondsworth, UK

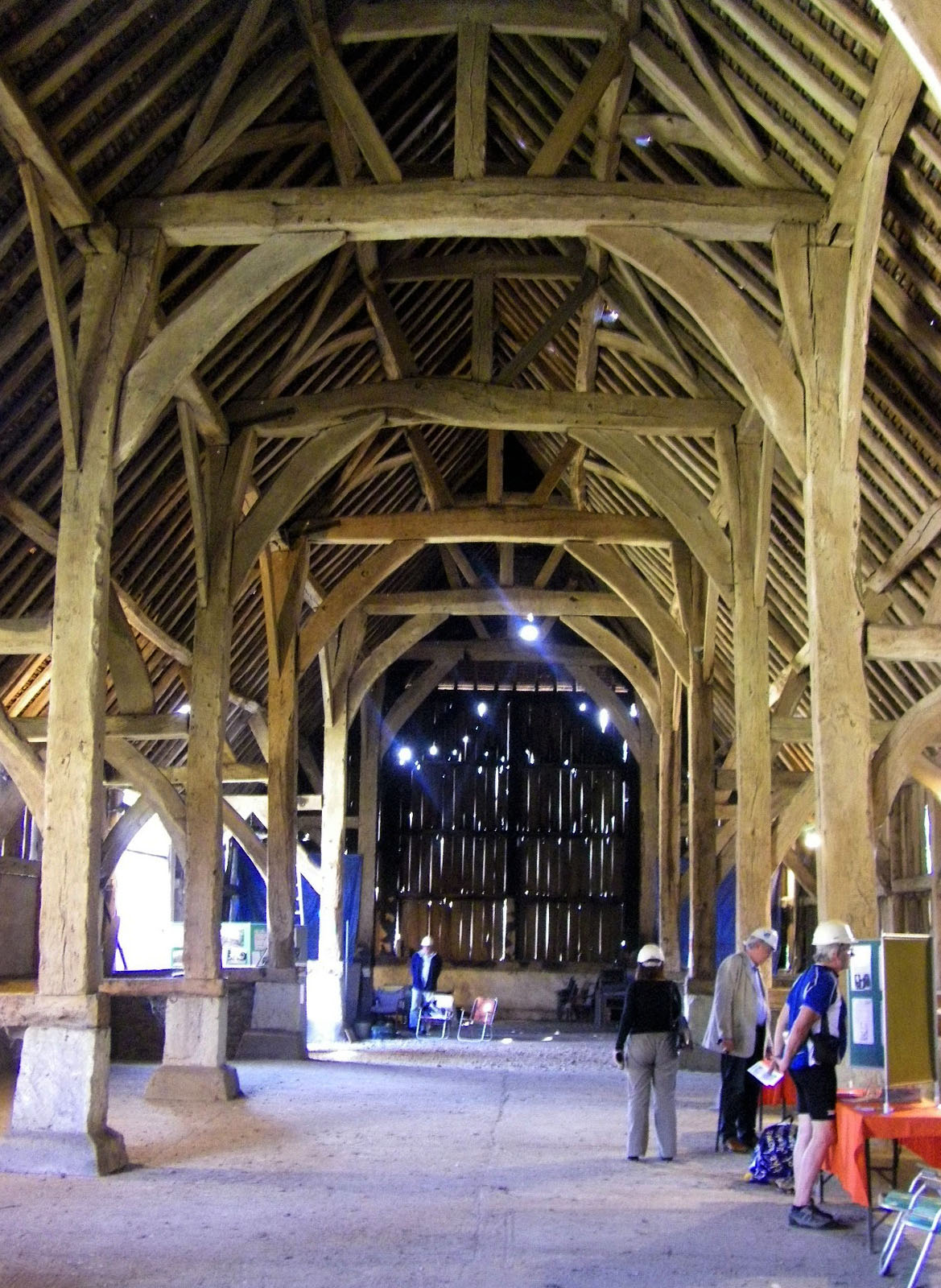
- The Great Barn in Harmondsworth

- Location within Greater London

General information
- Architectural style: Medieval
- Location: Harmondsworth, Greater London, England
- Coordinates: 51.4897°N 0.4799°W
- Completed: 15th century
- Client: William of Wykeham, Bishop of Winchester

Technical details
- Structural system: wooden frame

Harmondsworth Great Barn (also known as Manor Farm Barn) is a medieval barn on the former Manor Farm in the village of Harmondsworth, in the London Borough of Hillingdon, England. It is north-west of fields and the A4 next to Heathrow Airport. Built in the early 15th century by Winchester College, it is the largest timber-framed building in England and is regarded as an outstanding example of medieval carpentry. It was described by the English poet John Betjeman as the "Cathedral of Middlesex". A similar though smaller barn is part of the Manor Farm complex in Ruislip.

The barn was briefly in royal ownership but passed into the hands of three families who continued to use it for agricultural purposes until as late as the 1970s. It was subsequently owned by a property development company which redeveloped the farm complex. After the company went bankrupt in 2006, the barn was bought by property speculators betting on its compensation value if the nearby Heathrow Airport was expanded. The barn fell into disrepair and was closed to the public for all but one day a year. English Heritage stepped in, using a rare legal procedure to carry out repairs without the owner's consent, and eventually purchased the barn in January 2012. It is now open to the public from April to October on the second and fourth Sunday of each month under the management of the Friends of the Great Barn group.

== Structure ==
The barn is constructed nearly entirely of oak. It measures 192 feet (59 m) long, 37 feet (11 m) wide, and 39 feet (12 m) high, with twelve bays, running in a north–south direction. It occupies a footprint of about 7,110 square feet (661 m^{2}) and has an internal volume of about 173,000 cubic feet (4,900 m^{3}). There are three doors on the east side to permit the entry of wagons. The exterior of the barn is weatherboarded, with a hipped tiled roof. It was originally a much larger structure, with two wings, but the north wing was dismantled in 1774 and rebuilt in the now-demolished hamlet of Heathrow, on the site of the modern airport. It has been estimated that 95 per cent of the timbers, including the external weatherboarding, have survived from the original building. The barn has been described by English Heritage as "a supreme example of late-medieval craftsmanship – a masterpiece of carpentry containing one of the best and most intact interiors of its age and type in all of Europe."

The barn is an outstanding example of a late medieval aisled barn and is the largest timber-framed building in England. Barns of this type were based on a longitudinal frame, with two rows of posts connected by arcade plates. Because such barns tend to be both long and high, they experience high structural loads from the wind. They therefore have numerous internal braces, acting in much the same way as buttresses, to strengthen the structure. This gives the barn its distinctive internal appearance, with a lattice of beams and braces holding up the roof. The techniques used in its construction are similar to those employed on the great cathedrals being built at the time, and some of the same craftsmen were probably involved.

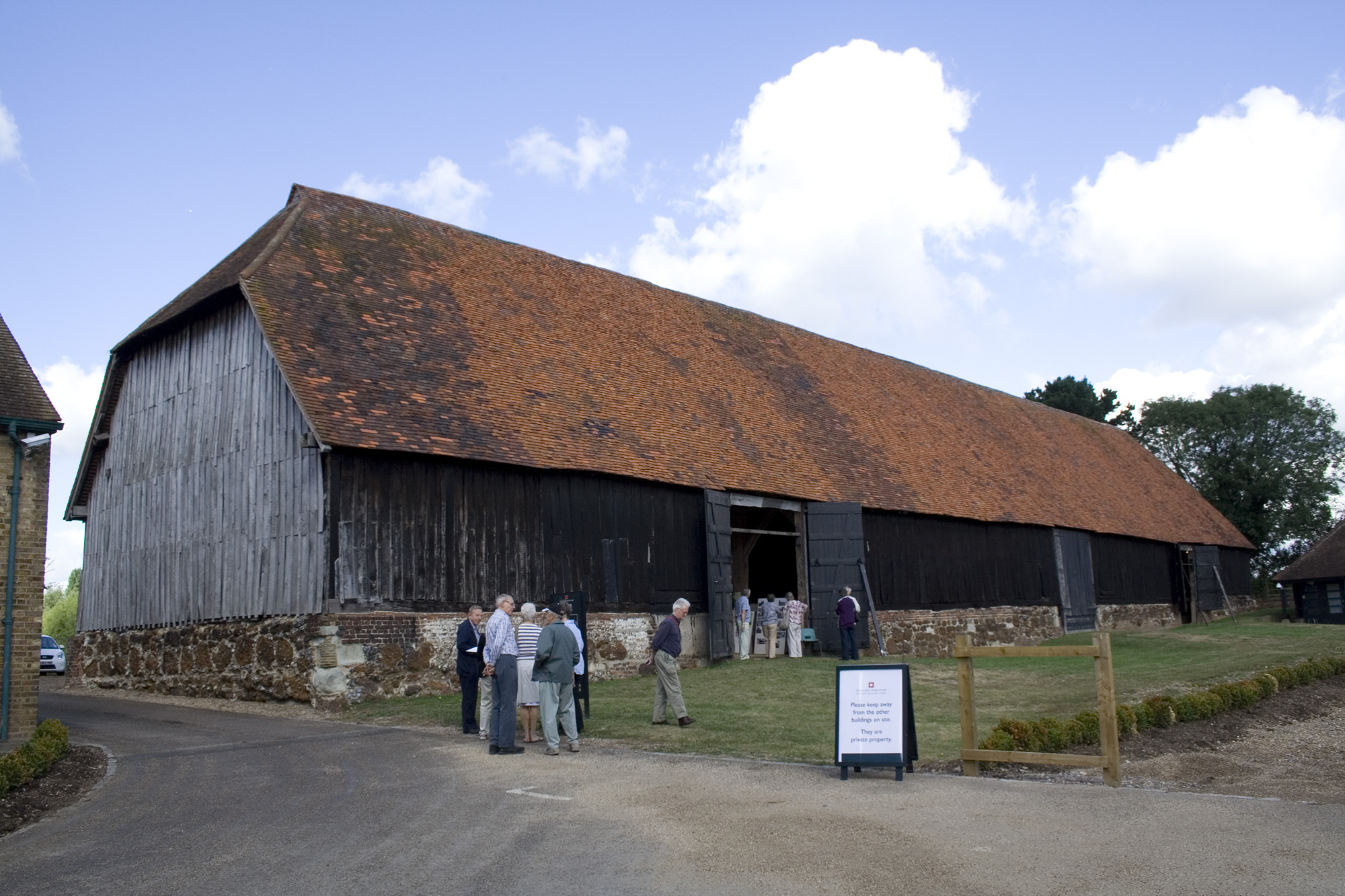
Exterior, eastern side

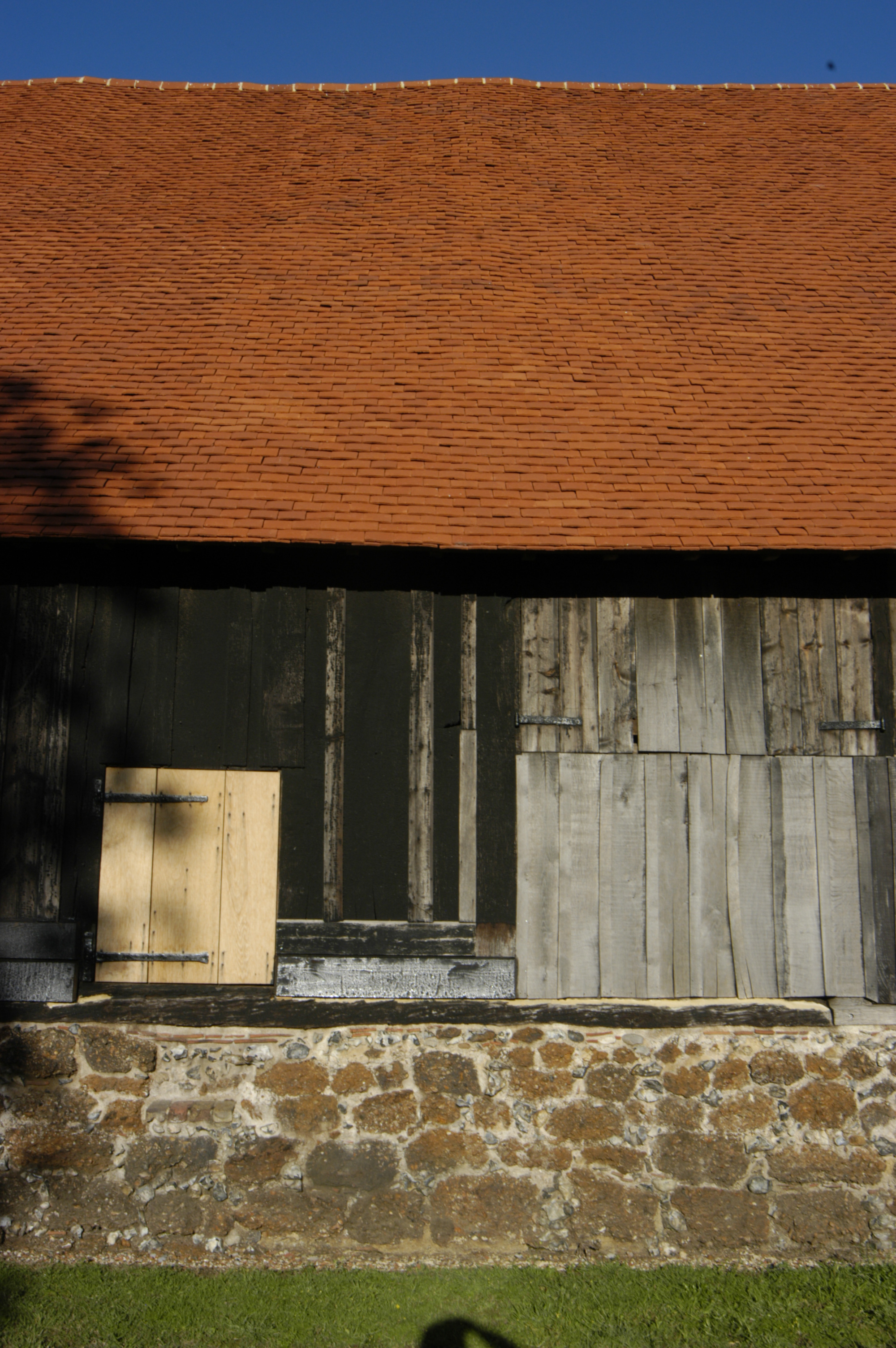
Section of the western side

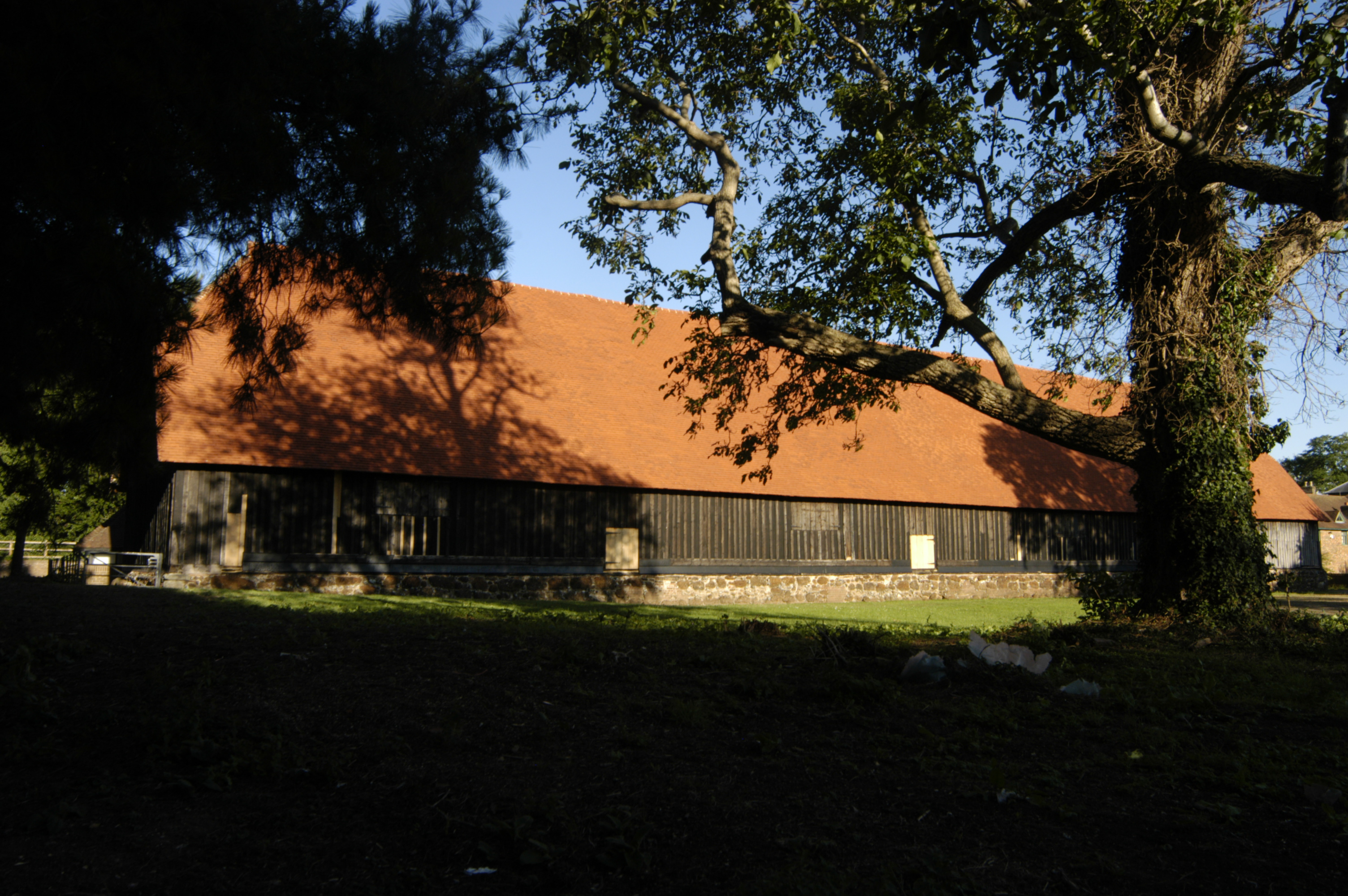
View from the north-west

Some aspects of the barn's design are unusual, both in the way that they are executed and in terms of their early date. The wall-plates of the aisle are made in sections and fixed (with tenon joints) into the aisle ties, rather than being strong and continuous, with the aisle ties fixed to the wall-plates. Another feature is that the purlins of the nave are fixed to the main rafters, rather than the normal method of being clasped between rafters and collar. Further, there is a crown-strut between the collar and the tie-beam. These features in the barn's carpentry are described by English Heritage as "experimental, precocious and regionally unusual". They attribute these to the high level of skill of the barn's master carpenters.

The use of aisles enabled the barn's architects to increase its width and by doing so, provided the maximum space for threshing floors. The longer the barn was, the more threshing floors could be provided. English barns went through an evolution in the number of threshing floors; the earliest had just one central floor, a design that became the commonest to be found in Britain. Harmondsworth Great Barn is unusual in having three threshing floors, allowing much more grain to be threshed at one time.

The barn features multiple apotropaic marks intended to turn away evil influences by magic. Its carpenters have left an extensive array of assembly marks on the woodwork, indicating how the wooden structure was to be put together.

The design of the barn has provided inspiration to a number of architects in the 19th and 20th centuries who were involved with the Gothic Revival movement. Sir George Gilbert Scott visited the barn in 1850 and sketched it, using its design as the basis for proposals for the new ChristChurch Cathedral in Christchurch, New Zealand. The library of Mansfield College, Oxford designed by Basil Champneys in the late 1880s also owes its inspiration to the barn. Bedales School's library, completed in 1922 and designed by Ernest Gimson, may also have had its origins in the barn's design.

== History ==
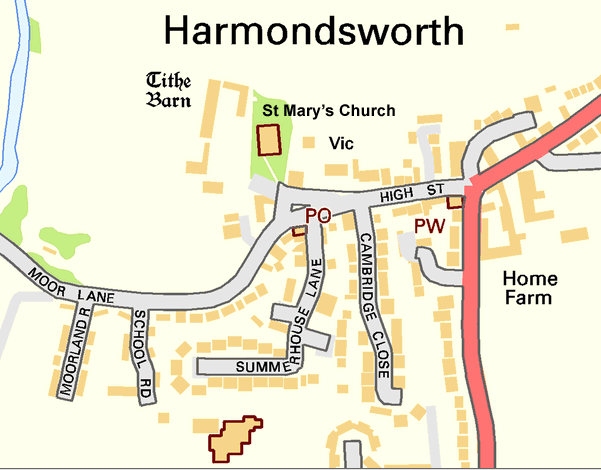
Location of Harmondsworth Great Barn (marked as "Tithe Barn")

The manor of Harmondsworth was owned before the Norman Conquest by King Harold Godwinson, but was seized by William the Conqueror after Harold's death at the Battle of Hastings in 1066. Three years later, William granted it to William FitzOsbern, one of his close confidants. It was subsequently transferred to the Abbey of Rouen. In 1391, it was acquired from the abbot and prior by William of Wykeham, the Bishop of Winchester. He gave it to Winchester College, which he had founded in 1382, as part of his endowment of that establishment.

By that time, the manor's existing barn was evidently becoming inadequate. The college's records indicate that in 1426–27 it commissioned two men, William Kypping (or Kipping) and John atte Oke, to obtain timbers from Kingston upon Thames to use for a new barn at Harmondsworth. This date matches an early fifteenth-century origin for the Great Barn's timbers, which has been established through dendrochronology.

The barn was given Grade I listed building status on 1 March 1950. The barn continued to be used for agricultural purposes until the 1970s. It had a narrow escape during the Second World War, when a German V-1 flying bomb destroyed a nearby barn, but only dislodged a few roof tiles on the Great Barn. The barn's southern bay was seriously damaged by fire in 1972 but it was subsequently restored. It underwent a detailed eighteen-month survey in the late 1980s by the craftsman Peter McCurdy (who later went on to rebuild Shakespeare's Globe theatre), supported by the Museum of London. The building was greatly admired by the Poet Laureate Sir John Betjeman, who dubbed it "the cathedral of Middlesex".

== Neglect and rescue ==
The barn and the surrounding Manor Farm property were purchased in 1986 by the John Wiltshier Group, a builder/property developer which aimed to restore the barn to serve as a showcase for the company. When the company went into receivership, the receiver offered the barn to Hillingdon Council and English Heritage for £1, but both refused the offer. Instead, a Gibraltar-based company calling itself Harmondsworth Barn Ltd bought the barn. It was reported that the company was seeking to speculate on obtaining compensation from a proposed expansion of Heathrow Airport. Such compensation would be paid should the land be required and the property demolished, although the barn fell just slightly outside the area required for a new runway. The new owners made no effort to maintain the barn, which fell into disrepair and was closed to the public apart from an annual one-day opening in conjunction with the Open House Weekend each September.

Neglect and repair: 2009–2012

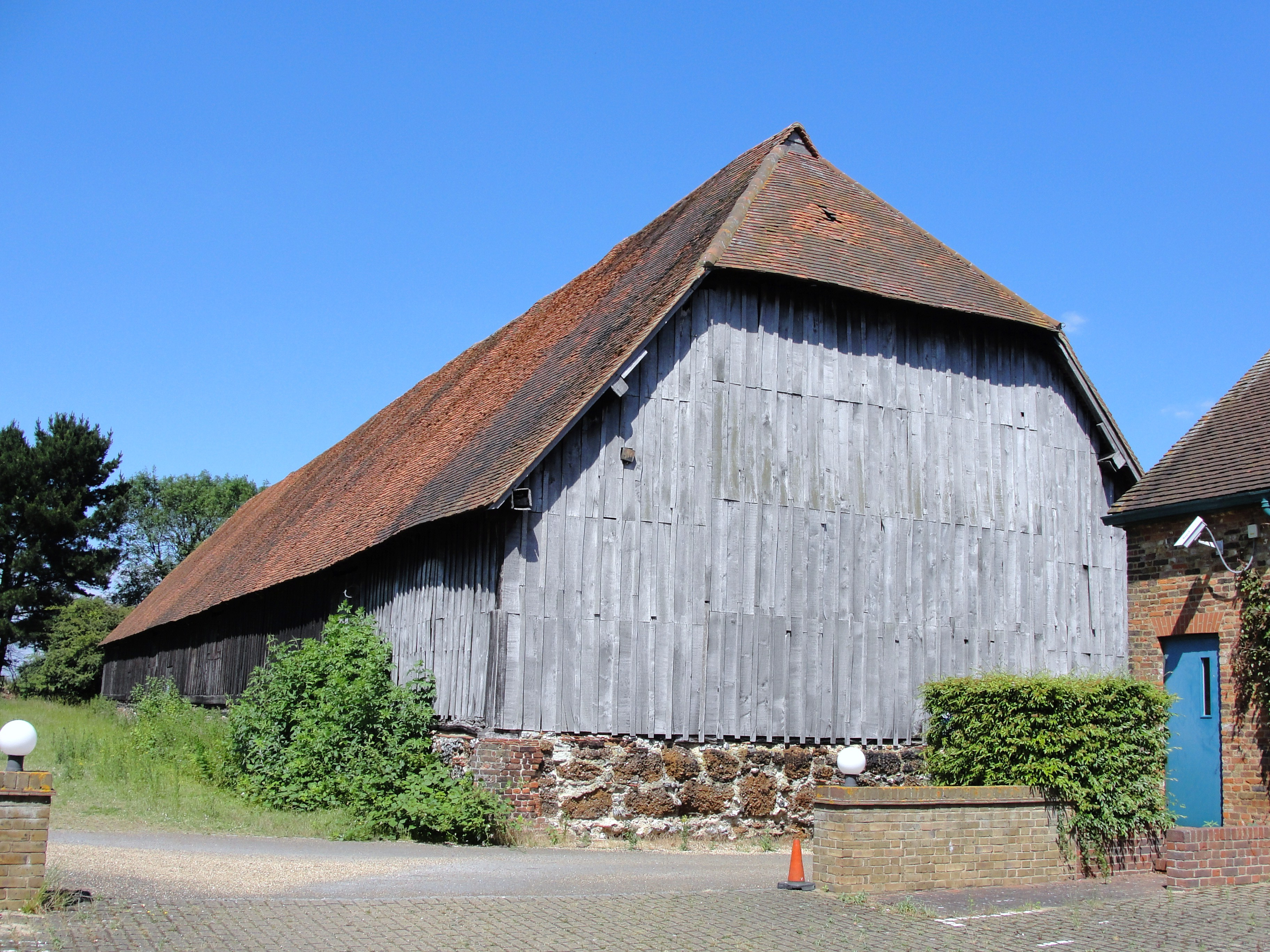
West view in 2009, showing plant growth and unrepaired damage to the south end roof

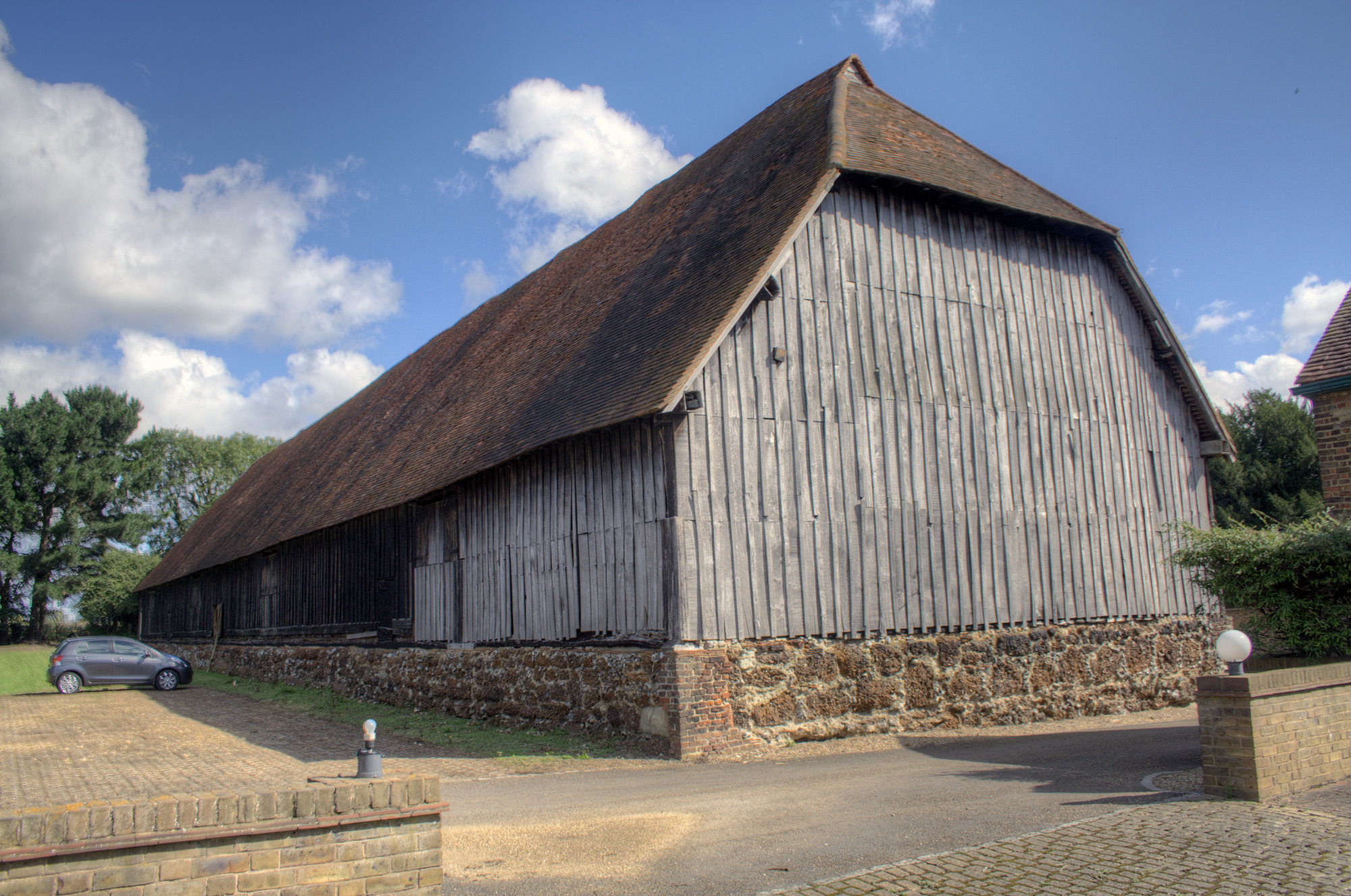
West view in 2012, showing repairs and improvements after English Heritage bought it

In 2009, the Society for the Protection of Ancient Buildings raised the alarm about the deteriorating condition of the barn. It reported that "more than a dozen gaps in the tiled roof were seen, some large. The site appeared to lack fire-fighting equipment or alarms, and could be easily accessed. Plants have taken root in the stone-and-brick plinth, and have begun to damage the medieval blocks upon which the barn stands." English Heritage stated: "The absentee owner of the barn has declined to engage with English Heritage (and the local authority) for some years despite our offers of help, support, advice and grants. The Heathrow expansion area would surround the site of the barn on three sides but would not, according to plans we have seen, propose its demolition or removal. However, this still leaves question marks over the barn's future and in particular, the issues of viability and setting."

Following this exchange, English Heritage stepped in to begin legal proceedings that could lead to the compulsory purchase of the barn. It carried out emergency repairs of the barn in November 2009, without the owners' consent, under an Urgent Works Notice. The repairs mainly involved fixing holes in the roof and preventing the ingress of rain water, as well as repairing the weatherboards on the sides. The intervention by English Heritage led to a protracted dispute over the £30,000 cost of the repairs that was scheduled to come to trial at the High Court of Justice in April 2012. In January 2012, a settlement was reached in which Harmondsworth Barn Ltd sold the barn to English Heritage for £20,000. By that time the government had abandoned its plans to expand Heathrow Airport, and the barn had become a liability for the company.

Simon Thurley, the Chief Executive of English Heritage, called the barn "one of the greatest medieval buildings in Britain, built by the same skilled carpenters who worked on our magnificent medieval cathedrals. Its rescue is at the heart of what English Heritage does." The local Member of Parliament, John McDonnell, said that he was "now overjoyed that we have secured this wonderful building for future generations." The Society for the Protection of Ancient Buildings welcomed the decision, calling the barn one of the "symbols of the dominance of the rural economy in the past, and the immense investment in craftsmanship and materials that agriculture deserved."

== Reopening and outlook ==
The barn is managed by volunteers from the Friends of the Great Barn at Harmondsworth, a local preservation group, acting on behalf of the owners, English Heritage. It is open to the public for free on the second and fourth Sunday of each month between April and October.

The 2015 Airports Commission report stated that while listed buildings in Longford and Harmondsworth would be lost if Heathrow Airport were to be expanded with a third runway, the Great Barn would remain standing "immediately outside the boundary of the expanded airport".

== See also ==
- Great Coxwell Barn, a barn of similar construction built c1292
- World's Largest Round Barn
