= Heather Professor of Music =

Endowed chair at the University of Oxford

The Heather Professor of Music is the title of an endowed chair at the University of Oxford. The post and the funding for it come from a bequest by William Heather (c. 1563 – 1627). Following the example of his friend William Camden who had left property to fund the establishment of a chair of history at Oxford in 1622, Heather founded a music lecture at Oxford and proposed to present the university "with some instruments and music books to promote a weekly music practice". He included specific instructions for music practice on Thursday afternoons during term times (except during Lent) and that there should be a Master of the Musicke. This master was to look after the musical instruments and the music books and to undertake rehearsals and provide both a theoretical and practical training in music.

The chair is linked to a fellowship of Wadham College.

The names of many of the Heather Professors have been memorialised in street names in and around the Wadham Park suburb of New Marston, Oxford. These include Nicholson Road, Goodson Walk, Hayes Close, Crotch Crescent, Ouseley Close, Stainer Place, Parry Close, Hugh Allen Crescent, Westrup Close. William Heather is himself remembered in Heather Place.

== List of Heather Professors of Music ==
- Richard Nicholson (1626)
- Arthur Phillips (1639)
- John Wilson (1656)
- Edward Lowe (1661)
- Richard Goodson (1682)
- Richard Goodson (1718)
- William Hayes (1741)
- Philip Hayes (1777)
- William Crotch (1797)
- Henry Bishop (1848)
- Frederick Ouseley (1855)
- John Stainer (1889)
- Hubert Parry (1900)
- Walter Parratt (1908)
- Hugh Allen (1918)
- Jack Westrup (1947)
- Joseph Kerman (1971)
- Denis Arnold (1975)
- Brian Trowell (1986)
- Reinhard Strohm (1996)
- Eric Clarke (2007)
- Laura Tunbridge (2025)

== Other references ==
- 'The Heather Professor of Music, 1626-1976: Exhibition in the Divinity School, October 1976' (Bodleian Library pamphlet)
