= Harlington, Harmondsworth and Cranford Cottage Hospital =

Hospital in Greater London, England

Coordinates: 51.4896°N 0.4482°W

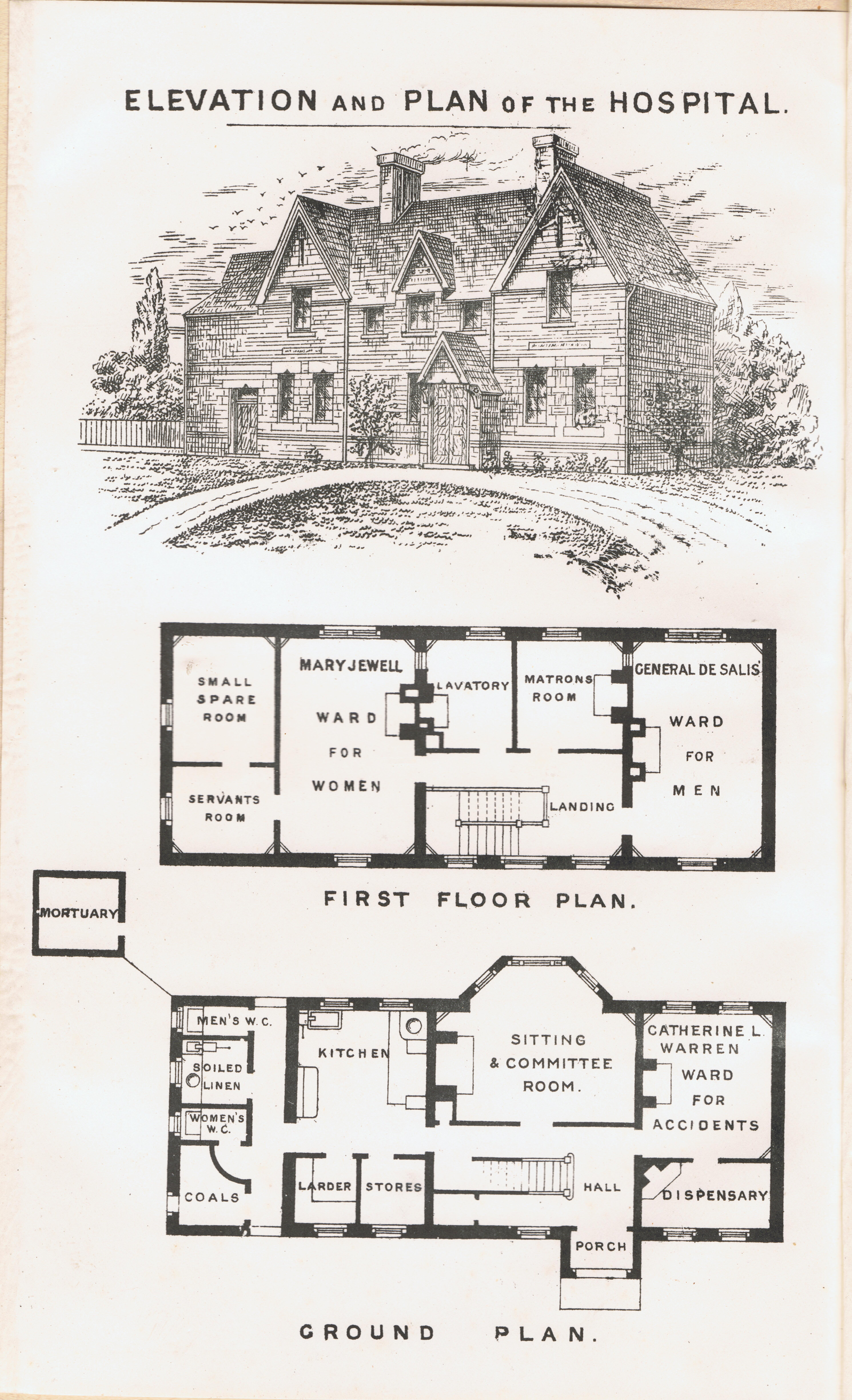
Elevation and Plan of the Cottage Hospital. (1884).

Harlington, Harmondsworth and Cranford Cottage Hospital was established in 1884 and opened in 1885.

== History ==
The cottage hospital, which was halfway between Harmondsworth and Cranford on the Sipson Road, about four furlongs west of Harlington in western Middlesex, opened in 1884. The earliest contributors were W. Fane De Salis and John Derby Allcroft, who produced the £428 needed for the site; the Honourble. Lady Cowell Stepney £100; Mrs. Fane De Salis £50; Mr. Goodbun £50. After patients were transferred to local general hospitals, it closed in 1977.

== External ==
- Harlington, Harmondsworth and Cranford Cottage Hospital Lost Hospitals of London
