= Richard Nicholson (musician) =

English organist and composer

Richard Nicholson (baptised 26 September 1563 – 1638 or 1639) was an English composer and organist and the first Heather Professor of Music at the University of Oxford.

== Life ==
Richard Nicholson was baptised in Durham and sang in Durham Cathedral choir from 1576 to 1580. He became organist of Magdalen College, Oxford, in January 1596 and obtained his Bachelor of Music degree from the University of Oxford in the following month. In 1626, William Heather appointed him as the first "Master of the Musicke" for the university, following a donation by Heather of music books, instruments and money for the purpose of theoretical and practical instruction in music. He was succeeded in the professorship by Arthur Phillips in November 1639, but he may have died in the previous year as the Magdalen College account books do not mention Nicholson after 1638.

Music known to be by Nicholson is mostly choral, although a few pieces for groups of instruments have been attributed to him. "O pray for the peace of Jerusalem" shows the influence of Thomas Tomkins. "When Jesus sat at meat" is for singers, including boy soloists, and instruments (viols), suggesting that it was composed for the classes that Nicholson was required to teach at Oxford. The Jews Dance for instrumental ensemble was recorded by the Julian Bream Ensemble in 1988. He also composed a five-part Latin motet, "Cantate Domino", which may have been for the purposes of his Oxford degree. He also contributed to The Triumphs of Oriana in 1601.
