= John Wilson (composer) =

English composer, lutenist and teacher

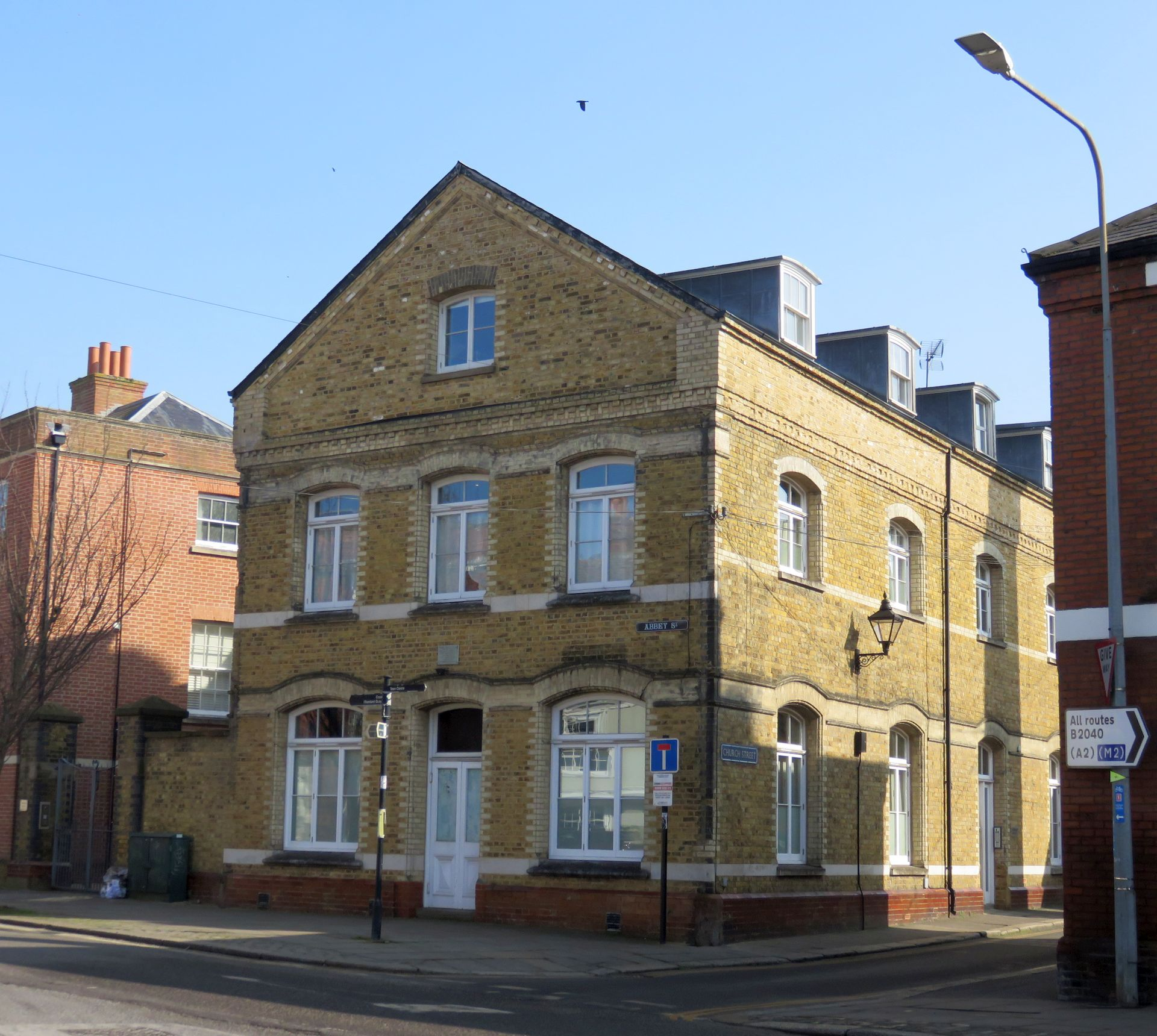
Wilson's birthplace, Faversham, Kent.

John Wilson (5 April 1595 – 22 February 1674) was an English composer, lutenist and teacher. Born in Faversham, Kent, he moved to London by 1614, where he succeeded Robert Johnson as principal composer for the King's Men, and entered the King's Musick in 1635 as a lutenist. He received the degree of D.Mus from Oxford in 1644, and he was Heather Professor of Music there from 1656 to 1661. Following the Restoration, he joined the Chapel Royal in 1662. He died at Westminster.

Wilson was part of a coterie of artists and musicians surrounding the court of Charles I that included the likes of Ben Jonson, Inigo Jones, Anthony van Dyck, Henry Lawes and Giovanni Coprario. Following the execution of the King in 1649 he showed his clearly Royalist sympathies in his Psalterium Carolinum, a versification of the Eikon Basilike by Thomas Stanley, with a dedicatory poem by Henry Lawes, published in 1657.

== Works ==
1. Select Ayres 1652
2. Catch that catch can
3. Pleasant Musical Companion 1667
4. Psalterium Carolinum, the devotions of His Sacred Majestie in his solitude and suffering, rendered in verse by T. Stanley, and set to musick for three voices and an organ or theorbo, 1657
