= William Heather =

English musician and benefactor (c. 1563 – 1627)

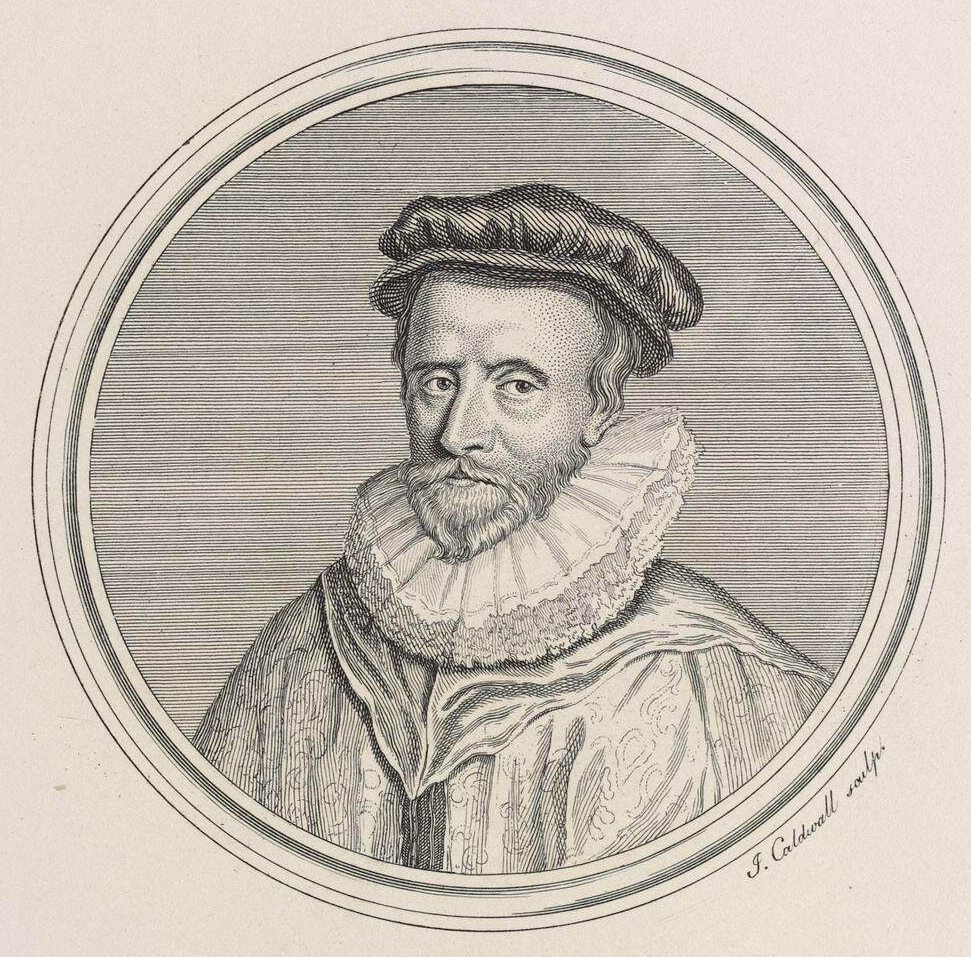
- Heather in 1622
- Born: c. 1563; Harmondsworth, Greater London, England
- Died: 1627 (aged 63–64)
- Burial place: Westminster Abbey
- Education: University of Oxford (BMus, DMus)
- Occupations: musician; benefactor to the University of Oxford
- Years active: 1586–1627

William Heather, or Heyther, (c. 1563 – 1627) was a musician and the founder of the position of the Heather Professor of Music at the University of Oxford.

== Life and career ==
William Heather was born in Harmondsworth and sang in the choir of Westminster Abbey as a lay clerk (i.e. he was not ordained) between 1586 and 1615, when he joined the choir of the Chapel Royal. In these roles he was present at the funerals of Elizabeth I of England (1603), James I (1625) and James's wife Anne of Denmark (1619), and at the coronation of Charles I (1626). He married Margery Fryer at the adjoining church of St Margaret's, Westminster, in 1589. The composer Thomas Tomkins dedicated a madrigal, "Music Divine" (1622), to him. Heather died in late July 1627 at Westminster Abbey (in the Almonry) and was buried in the abbey on 1 August 1627. His will (dated 21 July 1627) left instructions for 64 mourning gowns to be given to poor men, which has been taken to indicate his age.

== Oxford ==
Through his role at the abbey, Heather came to know William Camden, the historian and headmaster of Westminster School, whom he looked after during two periods of illness in 1601 and 1609. Upon establishing the position of Camden Professor of Ancient History at the University of Oxford in 1622, Camden gave the manor of Bexley, Kent, to the university on condition that the profits of the manor should be paid to Heather and his heirs for 99 years; in turn, they were to pay £140 from the £400 in profits to the Camden Professor. It was Heather who presented Camden's deed to the university, and in return he was awarded the degrees of BMus and DMus.

In 1626, Heather put forward the idea of promoting a weekly music practice at Oxford through donating instruments and music books. The university approved a weekly practice on a Thursday afternoon (except during Lent), under the supervision of a "Master of the Musicke" who would also care for the books and instruments. Heather's donation included a set of partbooks containing music by 16th-century English composers, now known as the "Forrest-Heather partbooks". The scheme also required the professor to provide theoretical and practical training in music. Heather chose Richard Nicholson of Magdalen College as the first professor. In 1627, Heather arranged to give an annual sum of £16, 6 shillings and 8 pence to the university, from which a lecturer on music theory would draw £3 (although in the end only one person held this position, and the money was later reallocated elsewhere) and the balance would go to the professor of music. A commemorative stone was placed in Westminster Abbey in 1926 to mark the 300th anniversary of the foundation by Heather of the chair; it was placed near the monument to Camden.
