= Laura Tunbridge =

British musicologist and academic

Laura Tunbridge, FBA, MAE (born 1974) is a British musicologist and academic, specialising in 19th and 20th-century music, Robert Schumann, Beethoven, chamber music, song, and opera. She is the Heather Professor of Music at the University of Oxford and a Professorial Fellow at Wadham College.

== Biography ==
Tunbridge was born in London, England in 1974. She studied music at The Queen's College, Oxford, graduating with a Bachelor of Arts (BA) degree in 1996. She studied for a Master of Arts (MA) degree in musicology from the University of Nottingham, graduating in 1997 with a distinction. She then moved to the United States where she studied for Master of Fine Arts (MFA) and Doctor of Philosophy (PhD) degrees at Princeton University: she completed her PhD in musicology in 2002.

Tunbridge began her academic career as a lecturer in music at the University of Reading from 2002 to 2004. She then moved to the University of Manchester where she was a senior lecturer in music analysis and critical theory. In October 2014, she joined the University of Oxford, and was elected a Henfrey Fellow and tutor in music at St Catherine's College, Oxford. In 2017, she was awarded a Title of Distinction as Professor of Music.

In 2020, she was elected a Member of the Academia Europaea (MAE). In 2021, she was elected a Fellow of the British Academy (FBA), the United Kingdom's national academy for the humanities and social sciences. She was appointed as the Heather Professor of Music at the University of Oxford, and as a Professorial Fellow at Wadham College, in October 2025.

== Selected works ==
- Tunbridge, Laura (2007). Schumann's late style. Cambridge: Cambridge University Press. ISBN 978-0521871686.
- Tunbridge, Laura (2010). The song cycle. Cambridge Introductions to Music. Cambridge: Cambridge University Press. ISBN 978-0521896443.
- Kok, Roe-Min; Tunbridge, Laura, eds. (2011). Rethinking Schumann. New York: OUP USA. ISBN 978-0195393859.
- Tunbridge, Laura (2018). Singing in the age of anxiety: lieder performances in New York and London between the World Wars. Chicago: University of Chicago Press. ISBN 978-0226563572.
- Tunbridge, Laura (2020). Beethoven: A Life in Nine Pieces. London: Viking. ISBN 978-0241414279.
