= Percy family =

English noble family

Percy
- Arms of Percy modern: Or, a lion rampant azure, as shown on the seal of Henry de Percy, 1st Baron Percy (d. 1314) affixed to the Barons' Letter, 1301 and blazoned with tinctures as his arms in the Caerlaverock Poem Roll of Arms of 1300
- Parent house: House of Brabant (since the late 12th century); House of Smithson (since the mid 18th century)
- Country: England; United Kingdom
- Founded: 1067; 959 years ago
- Founder: William de Percy (d. 1096), 1st feudal baron of Topcliffe
- Current head: Ralph Percy, 12th Duke of Northumberland
- Seat: Alnwick Castle
- Titles: Duke of Northumberland; Earl of Worcester; Earl of Egremont; Baron Percy
- Estates: See list: Warkworth Castle; Northumberland House; Petworth House; Stanwick Park; Prudhoe Castle; Albury Park; Syon House; Topcliffe Castle; Kielder Castle; Wressle Castle; Spofforth Castle

Arms of Percy: Azure, five fusils conjoined in fesse or These arms are still quartered by the Dukes of Northumberland, but were superseded c. 1300 by the adoption by Henry de Percy, 1st Baron Percy (d.1314) of the arms Or, a lion rampant azure, the source for which is variously given as the "Lion of Brabant", the extinct arms of Redvers, Earls of Devon, or the Lion of Arundel combined with the tinctures of Warenne

The Percy family is an old English noble family. They were among the oldest and most powerful noble families in Northern England for much of the Middle Ages. The noble family is known for its long rivalry with the House of Neville, another family powerful in northern England during the 15th century. The feud between the two families, known as the Percy-Neville feud led to the Wars of the Roses, at the time known as the Civil Wars, in England.

The House of Percy descends from William de Percy (d. 1096), a Norman who crossed to England after William the Conqueror in early December 1067. William de Percy was created as the 1st feudal baron of Topcliffe in Yorkshire. He was rebuilding York Castle in 1070.

The Percy surname derives from the manor of Percy-en-Auge in Normandy, the home of the Percy family at the time of the Norman Conquest. Family members have held the titles of Earl of Northumberland or Duke of Northumberland to this day, in addition to Baron Percy and others.

The Percy surname twice died out in the male line only to be re-adopted later by the husband or son of a Percy heiress. In the 12th century, the original Percy line was represented by Agnes de Percy, whose son by her husband Joscelin of Louvain adopted the surname. Again in the 18th century, the heiress Elizabeth Seymour married Sir Hugh Smithson, who adopted the surname Percy and was created Duke of Northumberland.

== Earls of Northumberland ==
Left: Paternal arms of Henry de Percy, 1st Baron Percy (1273–1314): Azure, five fusils in fess or,("Percy ancient") which he abandoned in favour of right: Or, a lion rampant azure ("Percy modern"/Brabant) Both arms were quartered by the Percy Earls of Northumberland and remain quartered by the present Duke of Northumberland

William de Percy, 1st Baron Percy, was in the train of William I. After arriving in England following the Harrying of the North (1069–70), he was bestowed modest estates in Yorkshire by Hugh d'Avranches. However, by the reign of Henry II the family was represented by only an heiress, Agnes de Percy (died 1203) following the death of the third feudal baron. As her dowry contained the manor of Topcliffe in Yorkshire, Adeliza of Louvain, the widowed and remarried second wife of Henry I, arranged the marriage of Agnes with her own young half-brother, Joscelin of Louvain. After their wedding, the nobleman from the Duchy of Brabant in the Holy Roman Empire settled in England. He adopted the surname Percy and his descendants were later created Earls of Northumberland. The Percys' line would go on to play a large role in the history of both England and Scotland. As nearly every Percy was a Warden of the Marches, Scottish affairs were often of more concern than those in England.

==== 1309: 1st Baron Percy ====
In 1309, Henry de Percy, 1st Baron Percy purchased Alnwick Castle from Antony Bek, Bishop of Durham. The castle had been founded in the late 11th century by Ivo de Vesci, a nobleman from Vassy or Vichy. A descendant of Ivo de Vesci, John de Vesci, succeeded to his father's titles and estates upon his father's death in Gascony in 1253. These included the barony of Alnwick and a large property in Northumberland and considerable estates in Yorkshire, including Malton. Due to being under age, King Henry III of England conferred the wardship of John's estates to a foreign kinsman, which caused great offence to the de Vesci family. The family's property and estates had been put into the guardianship of Bek, who sold them to the Percys. From this time, the fortunes of the Percys, although they still held their Yorkshire lands and titles, were linked permanently with Alnwick and its castle.

==== 1316: 2nd Baron Percy ====
Henry de Percy, 2nd Baron Percy, who was granted the lands of Patrick IV, Earl of March, in Northumberland, by Edward II in 1316, began to improve the size and defences of the castle. He was appointed to Edward III's Council in 1327 and was given the manor and castle of Skipton. He was also granted, by Edward III, the castle and barony of Warkworth in 1328. He was at the siege of Dunbar and the Battle of Halidon Hill and was subsequently appointed constable of Berwick-upon-Tweed. In 1346, Henry commanded the right wing of the English army which defeated a larger Scottish force at the Battle of Neville's Cross near Durham. His son, Henry de Percy, 3rd Baron Percy married Mary of Lancaster, an aunt of John of Gaunt's wife Blanche of Lancaster.

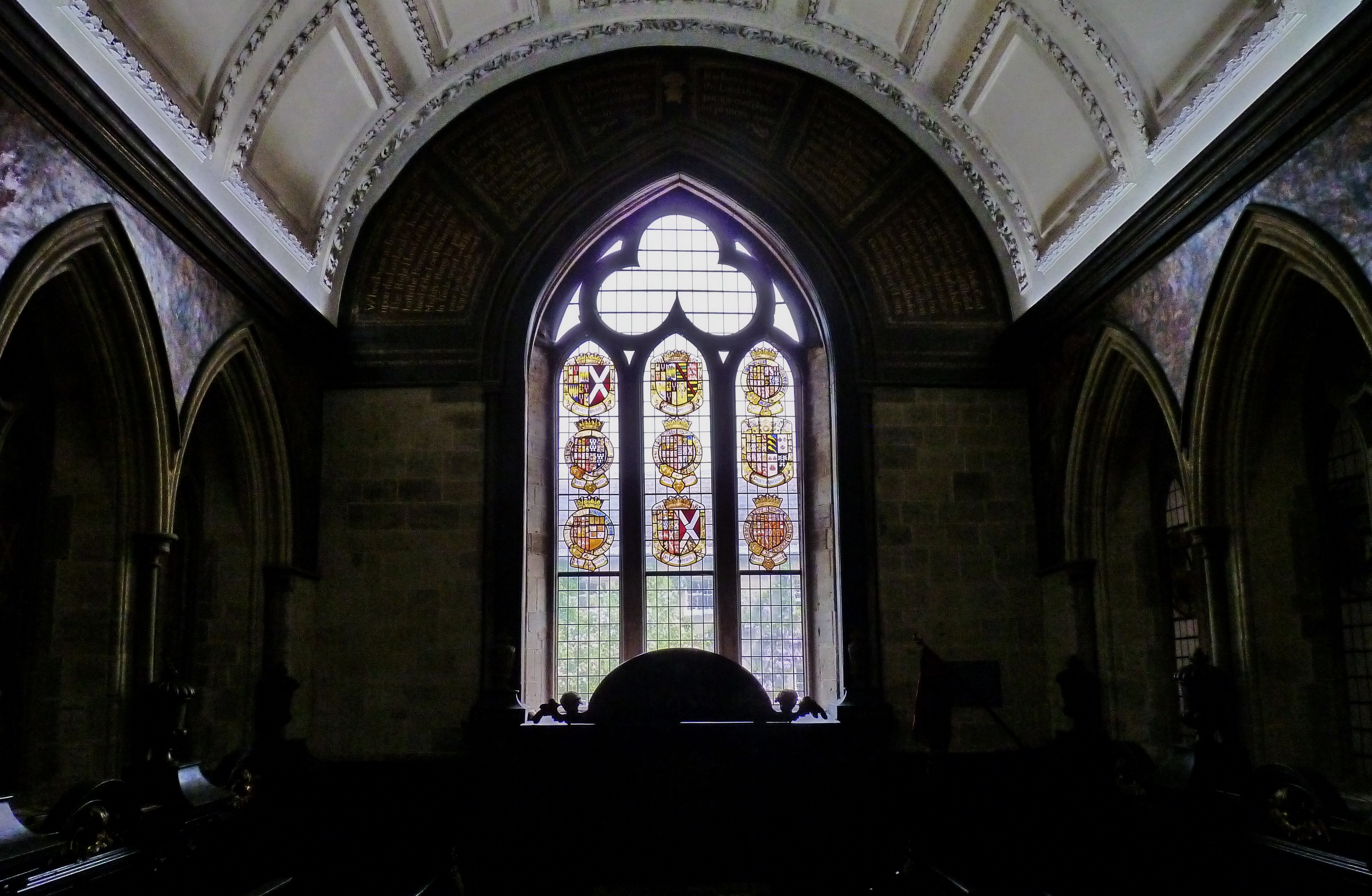
17th-century Percy Window in Petworth House, Sussex, displaying in stained glass 9 heraldic escutcheons of quartered arms of 1st, 3rd, 4th, 5th, 6th, father of 7th & 8th, 7th, 8th & 9th Percy Earls of Northumberland, each impaling the quartered arms of his wife.

In 1377, the next Henry Percy was created Earl of Northumberland, a title given to him after the coronation of Richard II. He supported the takeover by Henry IV but subsequently rebelled against the new king, leading to his estates being forfeited under attainder. In his rebellion he was aided by his son, the most famous Percy of all, Henry "Hotspur", who was slain at Shrewsbury in the lifetime of his father. Both the 1st Earl of Northumberland as well as his son Hotspur play a chief role in Shakespeare's Henry IV. Henry V restored Hotspur's son, the second Earl, to his family honours, and the Percys were staunch Lancastrians during the Wars of the Roses which followed, the third Earl and three of his brothers losing their lives in the cause.

Henry Percy, 4th Earl of Northumberland was involved in the political manoeuvrings of the last Yorkist kings Edward IV and Richard III. Through either indecision or treachery he did not respond in a timely manner at the Battle of Bosworth Field, and thus helped cause his ally Richard III's defeat at the hands of Henry Tudor (who became Henry VII). In 1489, he was pulled from his horse and murdered by some of his tenants.

Henry Percy, 6th Earl of Northumberland, loved Anne Boleyn, and was her accepted suitor before Henry VIII married her. He married later to Mary Talbot, the daughter of George Talbot, 4th Earl of Shrewsbury, but as he died without a son, his nephew Thomas Percy became the seventh Earl.

Thereafter, a succession of plots and counterplots—the Rising of the North, the plots to liberate Mary, Queen of Scots, and the Gunpowder Plot – each claimed a Percy among their adherents. On this account the eighth and ninth Earls spent many years in the Tower of London, but the tenth Earl, Algernon, fought against King Charles in the Civil War. The male line of the Percy-Louvain house and the earldom ended with Joceline Percy, 11th Earl of Northumberland.

Elizabeth Percy, heiress to the vast Percy estates married Charles Seymour, 6th Duke of Somerset. Upon the death of her grandson George Seymour, Viscount Beauchamp, the Percy inheritance was divided and Algernon Seymour, 7th Duke of Somerset was created Earl of Northumberland in 1749, with special remainder to his daughter Elizabeth Seymour, who had married a Yorkshire baronet, Sir Hugh Smithson. He inherited the earldom the following year and in 1766 was created the first Duke of Northumberland and Earl Percy, and it is their descendants who now represent the famous old house.

The current duke lives at Alnwick Castle and Syon House, just outside London.

== Dukes of Northumberland ==
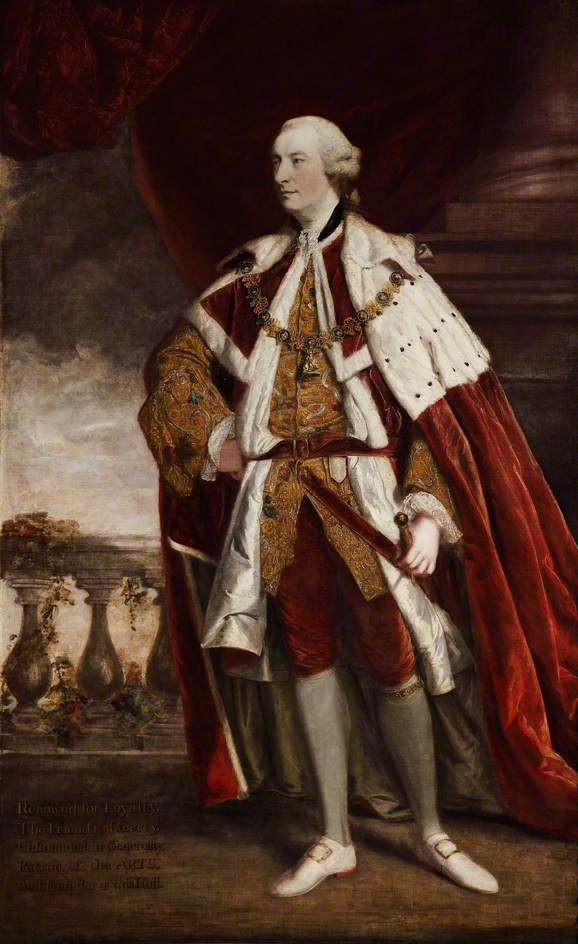
A portrait of Hugh Percy, 1st Duke of Northumberland

The title was created for the third time in 1766 for Hugh Percy, 2nd Earl of Northumberland (formerly Sir Hugh Smithson, 4th Baronet), who had assumed in 1750, by an act of Parliament, Hugh Earl of Northumberland's Name and Arms Act 1749 (23 Geo. 2. c. 14 Pr.), for himself and his descendants the surname Percy, due to his having married in 1740 the daughter of Algernon Seymour, 7th Duke of Somerset (1684–1750), whose mother Lady Elizabeth Percy (1667–1722) was the last of the senior blood line of the ancient House of Percy, being the only surviving child of Josceline Percy, 11th Earl of Northumberland (1644–1670). In 1749 King George II created Algernon (who had inherited the Dukedom of Somerset in 1748) Earl of Northumberland and Baron Warkworth, of Warkworth Castle in the County of Northumberland, with special remainder to his son-in-law Sir Hugh Smithson, 4th Baronet.

The above steps formed a deliberate move to allow ancient names and titles of the Percys to be revived in the male-heir exhausted senior branch of the Dukedom of Somerset, which at that time was about to see its largest removal – to another noble but very cadet branch (a fourth cousin) on Algernon's death. Algernon was also created Earl of Egremont at the same time, with a different remainder.

In 1784 the 1st Duke was also granted the substantive title Lord Lovaine, Baron of Alnwick in the County of Northumberland, in the Peerage of Great Britain, with remainder to his second son Lord Algernon Percy, who succeeded and who was created Earl of Beverley in 1790, and thus it too became a courtesy title.

The 1st Duke was succeeded in the dukedom and associated titles by his eldest son, Hugh, the 2nd Duke, a lieutenant-general in the British Army. The 2nd Duke was in his turn succeeded by his eldest son, Hugh, the 3rd Duke, who in 1812, five years before he succeeded in the dukedom, had been summoned to the House of Lords through a writ of acceleration in his father's junior title of Baron Percy. The 3rd Duke later held office as Lord-Lieutenant of Ireland from 1829 to 1830. He was childless and was succeeded by his younger brother, Algernon, 1st Baron Prudhoe, the 4th Duke, who in 1814 had been created Baron Prudhoe, of Prudhoe Castle in the County of Northumberland, in the Peerage of the United Kingdom. The 4th Duke was an admiral in the Royal Navy and notably served as First Lord of the Admiralty in 1852. He was also childless and on his death in 1865 the barony of Prudhoe became extinct while the barony of Percy (which could be passed on through the female line) was inherited by his great-nephew, John Stewart-Murray, 7th Duke of Atholl. The Admiral was succeeded in the dukedom and remaining titles by his first cousin, George, the 2nd Earl of Beverley, eldest son of the second son of the 1st Duke. The barony of Lovaine and earldom of Beverley have since been merged in the dukedom as courtesy titles.

The 5th Duke was succeeded by his eldest son, Algernon, the 6th Duke, who notably served as Lord Privy Seal between 1879 and 1880 under Lord Beaconsfield. The 6th Duke's eldest son, Henry, the 7th Duke, was summoned to the House of Lords through a writ of acceleration in his father's junior title of Lord Lovaine in 1887. The 7th Duke's eldest son, Henry Percy, Earl Percy, predeceased him. He was succeeded by his fourth but eldest surviving son, Alan, the 8th Duke, whose eldest son, Henry, the 9th Duke, was killed during the retreat to Dunkirk during the Second World War. Henry was succeeded by his younger brother, Hugh, the 10th Duke. In 1957, on the death of his fourth cousin once removed, James Stewart-Murray, 9th Duke of Atholl, Hugh succeeded as 9th Baron Percy, the title thus re-merging with the Dukedom. As of 2012 the titles are held by his second son, Ralph, the 12th Duke, who succeeded on the death of his elder brother in 1995. Northumberland Estates manages 100,000 acres (40,000 hectares): directly managing 4,000 acres (1,600 hectares) of forestry and 20,000 acres (8,000 hectares) of farmland, with approximately 100 tenant farmers managing the remaining bulk of the land.

== Other members of the Percy family ==
Several other members of the Percy family have also gained distinction. Charlotte Percy, Duchess of Northumberland, wife of the third Duke, was governess of the future Queen Victoria. Lord Josceline Percy, second son of the fifth Duke, was a politician. Lord Henry Percy, third son of the fifth Duke, was a soldier. Lord Algernon Percy, second son of the sixth Duke, was a politician. Lord Eustace Percy, seventh son of the seventh Duke, was a politician who was raised to the peerage as Baron Percy of Newcastle in 1953. Jane Percy, Duchess of Northumberland, wife of the twelfth Duke, is Lord-Lieutenant of Northumberland since 2009. See also Earl of Beverley for younger sons of the first Earl of Beverley.

== Estates and residences ==
=== Country seat ===
The seat of the Dukes of Northumberland is Alnwick Castle, which is located in Alnwick, Northumberland.

The traditional burial place of the Dukes is the Northumberland Vault in Westminster Abbey in London, the Percys thus being the last family to maintain such a privilege. The family vault is however nearly full and a new private graveyard has been created in Hulne Park near Alnwick.

== Recurring names ==
Recurring names in the Percy genealogy include:

- Henry (first borne by the 7th feudal baron of Topcliffe and his 10 immediate successors, including the 1st Earl and Harry Hotspur)
- Hugh (first borne by the 1st Duke)
- Joscelin/Josceline (first borne by Joscelin of Louvain)
- Algernon (first borne by the 1st Baron as a nickname: Aux Gernons or "with moustaches").

== Prominent members ==
Prominent members of the family include:

- William de Percy (d. 1096) (d. 1096), 1st feudal baron of Topcliffe, Yorkshire, nicknamed "Aux Gernons" ("with moustaches"), a Norman who emigrated to England at the time of the Conquest
- Alan de Percy, 2nd feudal baron of Topcliffe (d. circa 1130–5)
- William II de Percy, 3rd feudal baron of Topcliffe (d. 1174–5), who left two daughters Maud and Agnes as co-heiresses.
- Agnes de Percy (1134–1205), married Joscelin of Louvain (d. 1180). He was a son of Godfrey I, Count of Louvain of the House of Louvain, ancestor of the Dukes of Brabant, House of Hesse, and so the Mountbattens) either by his second wife, Clementia of Burgundy, or by a mistress (see Dukes of Brabant family tree). He was also brother-in-law to King Henry I, whose second wife was Joscelin's half-sister Adeliza of Louvain.
- Richard de Percy (d. 1244), 5th feudal baron of Topcliffe, signatory to Magna Carta. Died childless. Succeeded his elder brother Henry de Percy (d. 1198), the 4th Baron Topcliffe, whose son William III de Percy (1197–1245) became Richard's heir.
- William de Percy, (1197–1245), 6th feudal baron of Topcliffe
- Henry de Percy, 7th feudal baron of Topcliffe (1228–1272)
- Henry de Percy, 1st Baron Percy of Alnwick (1273–1314), 7th feudal baron of Topcliffe and 1st baron by writ.
- Henry de Percy, 2nd Baron Percy of Alnwick (1299–1352)
  - Henry de Percy, 3rd Baron Percy of Alnwick (see below)
  - Thomas Percy (d. 1369), Bishop of Norwich
- Henry de Percy, 3rd Baron Percy of Alnwick (1320–1368)
- Henry Percy, 1st Earl of Northumberland (1341–1408) (forfeit 1405), helped Henry IV seize the throne, later rebelled against him
- Henry Percy (1364/1366–1403), also called Harry Hotspur, helped Henry IV seize the throne but later rebelled against him, killed at the Battle of Shrewsbury
  - Henry Percy, 2nd Earl of Northumberland (see below)
  - Lady Elizabeth Percy (c. 1390 – 1437)
- Henry Percy, 2nd Earl of Northumberland (1394–1455), supporter of King Henry VI, killed at the beginning of the Wars of the Roses
  - Henry Percy, 3rd Earl of Northumberland (see below)
  - Thomas Percy, 1st Baron Egremont (1422–1460)
  - Katherine Percy, Countess of Kent (1423 – c. 1475)
  - Ralph Percy (d. 1464), knight, Lancastrian supporter in the Wars of the Roses
  - William Percy (1428–1462), Bishop of Carlisle
- Henry Percy, 3rd Earl of Northumberland (1421–1461) (forfeit 1461), Lancastrian leader in the Wars of the Roses, killed at the Battle of Towton
  - Henry Percy, 4th Earl of Northumberland (see below)
  - Margaret Percy (b. c. 1447)
- Henry Percy, 4th Earl of Northumberland (1449–1489) (restored 1470), aligned with Yorkists, present but inactive at the Battle of Bosworth Field
  - Henry Algernon Percy, 5th Earl of Northumberland (see below)
  - Eleanor Percy, Duchess of Buckingham (1474–1530), daughter of the 4th Earl
  - Alan Percy (c. 1480 – 1560), son of the 4th Earl, English churchman and academic
  - Anne FitzAlan, Countess of Arundel (1485–1552), daughter of the 4th Earl
  - Thomas Percy (1560–1605), great-grandson of the 4th Earl, participated in the Gunpowder Plot
- Henry Algernon Percy, 5th Earl of Northumberland (1478–1527)
  - Henry Percy, 6th Earl of Northumberland (1502–1537), betrothed to Anne Boleyn
  - Thomas Percy (c. 1504 – 1537), participated the Pilgrimage of Grace revolt
    - Blessed Thomas Percy, 7th Earl of Northumberland (1528–1572) (forfeit 1571; restored 1572), led the Rising of the North
    - Henry Percy, 8th Earl of Northumberland (see below)
- Henry Percy, 8th Earl of Northumberland (1532–1585)
  - Henry Percy, 9th Earl of Northumberland (see below)
  - William Percy (c. 1570/1574–1648), poet and playwright
  - Allan Percy (1577–1611) , member of parliament, married Mary Fitz (granddaughter of Sir William Courtenay)
  - George Percy (1580–1632), explorer, author, early governor of Virginia
- Henry Percy, 9th Earl of Northumberland (1564–1632), known as "The Wizard Earl" for his intellectual pursuits, imprisoned after the Gunpowder Plot
  - Dorothy Sidney, Countess of Leicester (c. 1598 – 1659)
  - Lucy Hay, Countess of Carlisle (1599–1660)
  - Algernon Percy, 10th Earl of Northumberland (see below)
  - Henry Percy, Baron Percy of Alnwick (d. 1659), royalist in the English Civil War
- Algernon Percy, 10th Earl of Northumberland (1602–1668), Lord High Admiral of England, later a Parliamentarian in the English Civil War
- Joceline Percy, 11th Earl of Northumberland (1644–1670), no male heirs, becomes the last male of direct Percy lineage to inherit the Earldom.
- Elizabeth Seymour, Duchess of Somerset (1667–1722), only daughter and heiress of the 11th Earl
- Algernon Seymour, 7th Duke of Somerset, 1st Earl of Northumberland (1684–1750), son of Elizabeth Seymour
- Elizabeth Percy (née Seymour), Duchess of Northumberland, 2nd Baroness Percy (1716–1776), daughter and heiress of the 7th Duke of Somerset, married Sir Hugh Smithson (who adopted the name Percy)
- Hugh Percy, 1st Duke of Northumberland (1714–1786), né Smithson
  - Hugh Percy, 2nd Duke of Northumberland (1742–1817), British army officer during the American Revolutionary War
    - Hugh Percy, 3rd Duke of Northumberland (1785–1847)
    - Algernon Percy, 4th Duke of Northumberland (1792–1865)
  - Algernon Percy, 1st Earl of Beverley (1750–1830), second son of the 1st Duke
    - George Percy, 2nd Earl of Beverley, 5th Duke of Northumberland (see below)
    - Algernon Percy (1779–1833), diplomat
    - Hugh Percy (1784–1856), bishop
    - Josceline Percy (1784–1856), Royal Navy officer
    - William Henry Percy (1788–1855), Royal Navy officer
- George Percy, 2nd Earl of Beverley, 5th Duke of Northumberland (1778–1867), politician
  - Algernon George Percy, 6th Duke of Northumberland (see below)
  - Lord Josceline Percy (1811–1881), politician
  - Lord Henry Percy (1817–1877), lieutenant-general in the British Army
- Algernon George Percy, 6th Duke of Northumberland (1810–1899), politician
  - Henry George Percy, 7th Duke of Northumberland (see below)
  - Lord Algernon Percy (1851–1933), politician
- Henry George Percy, 7th Duke of Northumberland (1846–1918), politician
  - Henry Percy, Earl Percy (1871–1909), politician
  - Alan Ian Percy, 8th Duke of Northumberland (see below)
  - Eustace Percy, 1st Baron Percy of Newcastle (1887–1958), politician
- Alan Ian Percy, 8th Duke of Northumberland (1880–1930)
  - Henry George Alan Percy, 9th Duke of Northumberland (1912–1940), killed in World War II
  - Hugh Algernon Percy, 10th Duke of Northumberland (see below)
  - Elizabeth Douglas-Hamilton, Duchess of Hamilton and Brandon (1916–2008)
- Hugh Algernon Percy, 10th Duke of Northumberland (1914–1988)
  - Henry Alan Walter Richard Percy, 11th Duke of Northumberland (1953–1995)
  - Ralph George Algernon Percy, 12th Duke of Northumberland (b. 1956)
    - Lady Katie Percy (b. 1982)
    - George Dominic Percy, Earl Percy (b. 1984)
    - Lady Melissa Jane Percy (b. 1987)
    - Lord Max Percy (b. 1990), husband of Princess Nora zu Oettingen-Spielberg

== Family tree ==
part of this is taken from the article on the Duke of Northumberland

=== Origins of the Percies and Relation to House of Louvain/Brabant ===
The original de Perci family in England was continued by Joscelin of Louvain, a member of the House of Louvain/Brabant, Dukes of Lower Lorraine and Brabant.

Genealogy of the House of Louvaine in England (Percy)

William de Perci aux Gernons ("with whiskers", later became a common name in the family, "Algernon") arrived in England from Normandy 1067 from Percy-en-Auge in Normandy; 1st feudal baron of Topcliffe, North Yorkshire (d. 1096/9)
Alan de Perci; 2nd feudal baron of Topcliffe (d. circa 1130/5)
William II de Perci (d. 1174/5); 3rd feudal baron of Topcliffe	Godfrey I, Count of Louvain	Ida of Chiny (1078–1117)
Agnes de Perci (1134–1205)	Joscelin of Louvain (d. 1180); 4th feudal baron of Topcliffe	Adeliza of Louvain	2. King Henry I of England 1.	Matilda of Scotland	Dukes of Brabant
Henry de Perci	Richard de Perci (d. 1244); 5th feudal baron of Topcliffe	Empress Matilda	William Adelin	House of Hesse; Mountbattens
William III de Perci (1197–1245); 6th feudal baron of Topcliffe	King Henry II "FitzEmpress" of England
Henry de Perci (1228–1272); 7th feudal baron of Topcliffe
Henri de Perci 8th feudal baron of Topcliffe; 1st Baron Percy of Alnwick by writ. (1273–1314)
Henry de Percy; 9th feudal baron of Topcliffe; 2nd Baron Percy of Alnwick (1299–1352)
Henry de Percy; 10th feudal baron of Topcliffe; 3rd Baron Percy of Alnwick (1320–1368)	Mary of Lancaster	Thomas Percy bishop of Norwich (d. 1369)
Margaret Neville	Henry Percy; 11th feudal baron of Topcliffe; 4th Baron Percy of Alnwick; 1st Earl of Northumberland, 1377 forfeit 1405 (1341–1408)	Maud Lucy heiress of Egremont	Thomas Percy; 1st Earl of Worcester (1343 – 1403)
Henry Percy (Hotspur) (1364 – 1403)	Thomas Percy	Ralph Percy	Alan Percy	Mary Percy
Elizabeth (c. 1390 – 1437)	Henry Percy; 2nd Earl of Northumberland, 1416 (1394–1455)
Henry; 3rd Earl of Northumberland (1421–1461 )	Thomas Percy; 1st Baron Egremont (1422–1460)	Katherine (1423 Aft. 1475 )	George Percy (1424–1474 )	Ralph Percy ( 1425–1464)	Richard Percy	William Percy; Bishop of Carlisle (1428–1462)	Joan Percy (1430–1482) married Lord Edmund d'Aganet, 8th Baron of Blyth	Anne Percy (1436–1522) married Thomas Hungerford of Rowden
Henry Percy; 4th Earl of Northumberland (1449–1489) (restored 1470)	Sir Ralph Percy	Peter Percy	Sir Henry Percy	George Percy	John Percy
Henry Algernon Percy; 5th Earl of Northumberland (1478–1527)	Alan Percy (c. 1480 – 1560)	Joscelin Percy	Richard Pearce
Henry Percy; 6th Earl of Northumberland (1502–1537) betrothed to Anne Boleyn	Thomas Percy (c. 1504 – 1537) participated the Pilgrimage of Grace revolt	Edward Percy
Thomas Percy; 7th Earl of Northumberland (forfeit 1571; restored 1572) led the Rising of the North (1528–1572)	Henry Percy; 8th Earl of Northumberland (1532–1585)	Thomas Percy convicted in the Gunpowder Plot (c. 1560 – 1605)
Henry Percy; 9th Earl of Northumberland "the Wizard Earl" (1564–1632)	Thomas Percy	William Percy	Sir Charles Percy	Richard Percy	Sir Joscelin Percy	Sir Alan Percy	Sir George Percy explorer, author, gov. of Virginia (1580–1632)
Algernon Percy; 10th Earl of Northumberland (1602–1668); Lord High Admiral of England, later a Parliamentarian in the English Civil War	Henry Percy; Baron Percy of Alnwick (d. 1659) royalist in the English Civil War
Joceline Percy; 11th Earl of Northumberland (1644–1670) no male heirs, becomes the last male of direct Percy lineage to inherit the Earldom
Henry Percy; Lord Percy (1668–1669) only son and heir apparent	Elizabeth Percy suo jure Baroness Percy (1667–1722)	Charles Seymour, 6th Duke of Somerset
Algernon Seymour, 7th Duke of Somerset; Baron Percy (1684–1750) created Earl of Northumberland, with remainder to his son-in-law
George Seymour; Viscount Beauchamp (1725–1744)	Elizabeth Percy suo jure 2nd Baroness Percy (1730–1776)	Sir Hugh Percy né Smithson; 4th Baronet; 2nd Earl of Northumberland by special remainder, 1750, and 1st Duke of Northumberland by creation 1766 (1714–1786)

=== Later Medieval and Early Modern Percies/Earls of Northumberland ===
This summary genealogical tree shows how the current house of Percy is derived from the later Medieval :

Family tree of the Earls and Dukes of Northumberland and Earls of Beverley

King Henry III; 1207–1272
Baron Percy of Alnwick (2nd creation), 1299
Henry de Percy; 1273–1314; 8th Baron Percy of Topcliffe, 1st Baron Percy	Edmund Crouchback; 1245–1296; Earl of Leicester, Earl of Lancaster, Earl of Derby	King Edward I 1239–1307
Henry de Percy; 1300–1351; 9th Baron Percy of Topcliffe, 2nd Baron Percy	Henry c. 1281–1345; Earl of Leicester, Earl of Lancaster	King Edward II; 1284–1327
Henry de Percy; 1320–1368; 3rd Baron Percy	Mary of Lancaster c. 1320–1321–1362	Henry of Grosmont c. 1310–1361; Duke of Lancaster, Earl of Leicester	King Edward III; 1312–1377
Earl of Northumberland (1st creation), 1377	Earl of Worcester
Henry Percy; 1341–1408; 1st Earl of Northumberland, 4th Baron Percy	Thomas Percy; 1343–1403; Earl of Worcester	Blanche of Lancaster; 1342–1368	John of Gaunt; 1340–1399; Duke of Lancaster, Earl of Leicester, Earl of Derby, Earl of Richmond
(attainted 1405)
Henry Percy "Hotspur" c. 1365–1403	Joan Beaufort c. 1379–1440	John Beaufort c. 1370–1410; Earl of Somerset
Earl of Northumberland (2nd creation), 1416
Henry Percy; 1394–1455; 2nd Earl of Northumberland, 5th Baron Percy	Eleanor Neville c. 1398–1472	Richard Neville; 1400–1460; Earl of Salisbury	John Beaufort; 1404–1444; Duke of Somerset	Edmund Beaufort; 1406–1455; Duke of Somerset
Earl of Northumberland (3rd creation), 1464; Marquess of Montagu, 1470
Henry Percy; 1421–1461; 3rd Earl of Northumberland, 6th Baron Percy	John Neville c. 1431–1471; Marquess of Montagu, etc.	Eleanor Beaufort; 1431–1501	Margaret Beaufort; 1443–1509
(forfeit 1461)	Marquessate of Montagu and Earldom of Northumberland (3rd creation) forfeit, 1470
(restored 1470)
Henry Percy; 1449–1489; 4th Earl of Northumberland, 7th Baron Percy	King Henry VII; 1457–1509
Henry Algernon Percy; 1478–1527; 5th Earl of Northumberland, 8th Baron Percy	Katherine Spencer; 1477–1542	Mary Tudor (Queen of France); 1496–1533 m.(2) Charles Brandon; Duke of Suffolk	Margaret Tudor; 1489–1541
Duke of Northumberland (1st creation), 1551
Henry Percy; 1502–1537; 6th Earl of Northumberland, 9th Baron Percy	Thomas Percy c. 1504–1537	John Dudley; 1504–1553; 1st Duke of Northumberland	Frances Brandon; 1517–1559 m. Henry Grey; Duke of Suffolk	James V of Scotland; 1512–1542
(attainted 1537)	(extinct 1553)
Earl of Northumberland (2nd creation) restored and Baron Percy of Alnwick (3rd creation), 1557
Thomas Percy; 1528–1572; 7th Earl of Northumberland, 1st Baron Percy	Henry Percy; 1532–1585; 8th Earl of Northumberland, 2nd Baron Percy	Guildford Dudley c. 1535–1554	Jane Grey c. 1537–1554	Lady Katherine Grey; 1540–1568 m. Edward Seymour; Earl of Hertford	Mary, Queen of Scots; 1542–1587
Henry Percy; 1564–1632; 9th Earl of Northumberland, 3rd Baron Percy	Edward Seymour; 1561–1612; Viscount Beauchamp	King James VI and I 1566–1625
Algernon Percy; 1602–1668; 10th Earl of Northumberland, 4th Baron Percy	Francis Seymour c. 1590–1664; Baron Seymour of Trowbridge	King Charles I 1600–1649
Josceline Percy; 1644–1670; 11th Earl of Northumberland, 5th Baron Percy	Charles Seymour c. 1621–1665; Baron Seymour of Trowbridge	King Charles II; 1630–1685
Earldom of Northumberland and Barony Percy extinct, 1670
Earl of Northumberland (4th creation), Viscount Falmouth (1st creation), and Baron of Pontefract, 1674; Duke of Northumberland (2nd creation), 1683
Elizabeth Seymour; 1667–1722	Charles Seymour; 1662–1748; Duke of Somerset	George FitzRoy; 1665–1716; Duke of Northumberland, etc.
Earldom of Northumberland and Dukedom of Northumberland extinct, 1716
Baron Percy (4th creation) created erroneously, 1722; Earl of Northumberland (5th creation) and Baron Warkworth, 1749
Algernon Seymour; 1684–1750; Duke of Somerset, 1st Earl of Northumberland, etc. 1st Baron Percy
Duke of Northumberland (3rd creation), 1766; Lord Lovaine, Baron of Alnwick in the County of Northumberland
Hugh Percy formerly Hugh Smithson; 1714–1786; 1st Duke of Northumberland, 2nd Earl of Northumberland, etc. 1st Baron Lovaine, 4th Baronet Smithson	Elizabeth Seymour; 1716–1776; 2nd Baroness Percy suo jure
Earl of Beverley, 1790
Hugh Percy; 1742–1817; 2nd Duke of Northumberland, 3rd Earl of Northumberland, etc. 3rd Baron Percy	Algernon Percy; 1750–1830; 1st Earl of Beverley, 2nd Baron Lovaine
Baron Prudhoe, of Prudhoe Castle in the County of Northumberland, 1814
Hugh Percy; 1785–1847; 3rd Duke of Northumberland, 4th Earl of Northumberland, etc. 4th Baron Percy	Emily Frances Percy; 1789–1844	Algernon Percy; 1792–1865; 4th Duke of Northumberland, 5th Earl of Northumberland, etc. 1st Baron Prudhoe, 5th Baron Percy	George Percy; 1778–1867; 5th Duke of Northumberland, 6th Earl of Northumberland, etc. 2nd Earl of Beverley, 3rd Baron Lovaine
Barony Prudhoe extinct, 1865
George Augustus Frederick John Murray; 1814–1864; Duke of Atholl, Baron Strange	Algernon George Percy; 1810–1899; 6th Duke of Northumberland, 7th Earl of Northumberland, etc. 3rd Earl of Beverley, 4th Baron Lovaine
John James Hugh Henry Stewart-Murray; 1840–1917; Duke of Atholl, Baron Strange, 6th Baron Percy	Henry George Percy; 1846–1918; 7th Duke of Northumberland, 8th Earl of Northumberland, etc. 4th Earl of Beverley, 5th Baron Lovaine
John George Stewart-Murray; 1871–1942; Duke of Atholl, Baron Strange, 7th Baron Percy	James Thomas Stewart-Murray; 1879–1957; Duke of Atholl, Baron Strange, 8th Baron Percy	Alan Ian Percy; 1880–1930; 8th Duke of Northumberland, 9th Earl of Northumberland, etc. 5th Earl of Beverley, 6th Baron Lovaine
Henry George Alan Percy; 1912–1940; 9th Duke of Northumberland, 10th Earl of Northumberland, etc. 6th Earl of Beverley, 7th Baron Lovaine	Hugh Algernon Percy; 1914–1988; 10th Duke of Northumberland, 11th Earl of Northumberland, etc. 7th Earl of Beverley, 8th Baron Lovaine, 9th Baron Percy
Henry Alan Walter Richard Percy; 1953–1995; 11th Duke of Northumberland, 12th Earl of Northumberland, etc. 8th Earl of Beverley, 9th Baron Lovaine, 10th Baron Percy	Ralph George Algernon Percy b. 1956; 12th Duke of Northumberland, 13th Earl of Northumberland, etc. 9th Earl of Beverley, 10th Baron Lovaine, 11th Baron Percy
George Dominic Percy b. 1984 styled Earl Percy
Heir apparent to the Dukedom of Northumberland

=== Modern House of Percy ===
This shows the descent of the present Percy family from the current creation of the 1st Duke of Northumberland:

Family tree of the Modern Dukes of Northumberland

DUKE OF NORTHUMBERLAND, 1766
Hugh Percy, 2nd Earl of Northumberland, 1st Duke of Northumberland (1714–1786) formerly Sir Hugh Smithson, Bt.	Elizabeth Seymour, 2nd Baroness Percy (1716–1776)
Earl of Beverley
Hugh Percy, 2nd Duke of Northumberland (1742–1817)	Algernon Percy, 1st Earl of Beverley (1750–1830)
Hugh Percy, 3rd Duke of Northumberland (1785–1847)	Algernon Percy, 4th Duke of Northumberland (1792–1865)	George Percy, 5th Duke of Northumberland (1778–1867)
Algernon George Percy, 6th Duke of Northumberland (1810–1899)
Henry George Percy, 7th Duke of Northumberland (1846–1918)
Alan Ian Percy, 8th Duke of Northumberland (1880–1930)
Henry George Alan Percy, 9th Duke of Northumberland (1912–1940)	Hugh Algernon Percy, 10th Duke of Northumberland (1914–1988)
Henry Alan Walter Richard Percy, 11th Duke of Northumberland (1953–1995)	Ralph George Algernon Percy, 12th Duke of Northumberland (b. 1956)

== Coats of arms ==
Paternal arms of Henry de Percy, 1st Baron Percy (1273–1314): Azure, five fusils in fess or,("Percy ancient") which he abandoned in favour of right: Or, a lion rampant azure ("Percy modern"/Brabant) Both arms were quartered by the Percy Earls of Northumberland and remain quartered by the present Duke of Northumberland

Arms of original de Perci family

Arms of the Percy family descended from Joscelin de Louvain

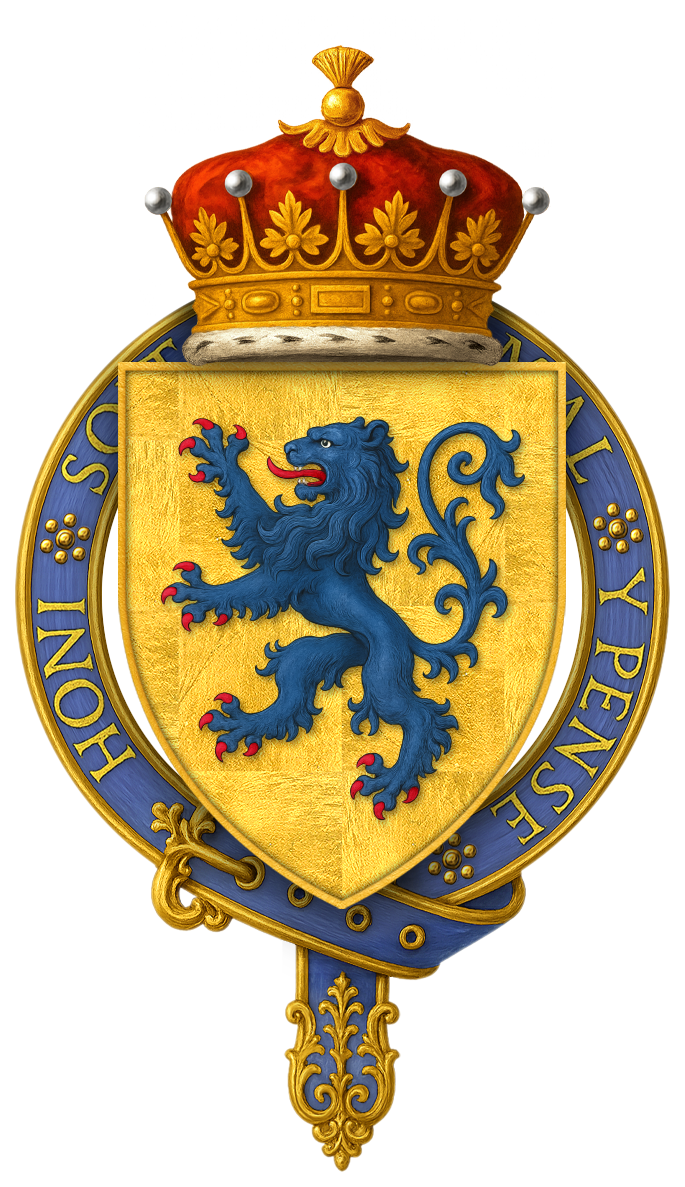
Sir Henry Percy, 1st Earl of Northumberland, KG

Coat of arms of Percy and Lucy families quartered, arms of the Earls and Dukes of Northumberland.

Henry "Hotspur" Percy

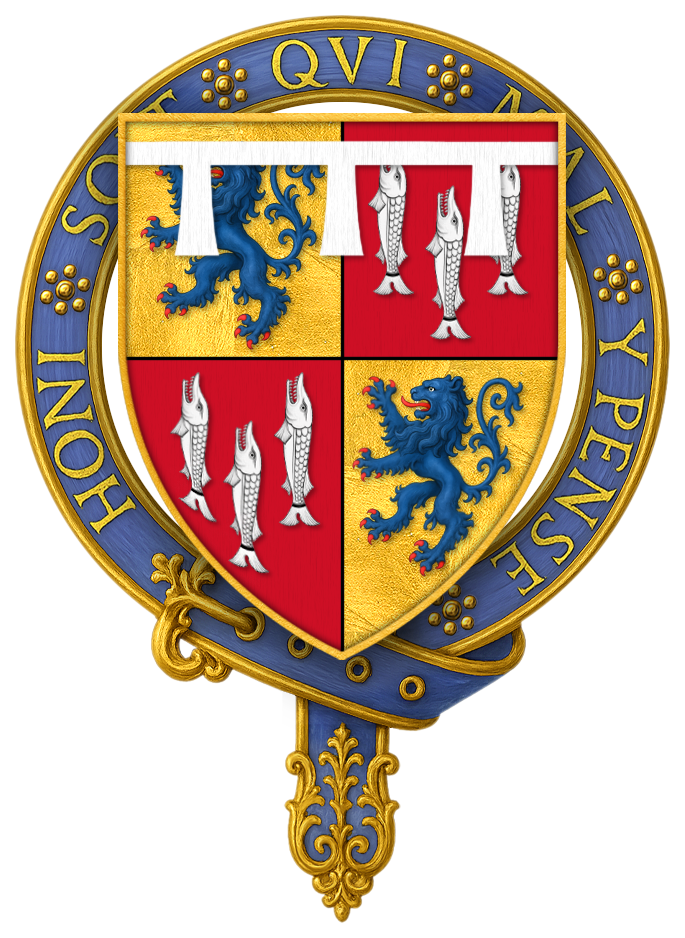
Sir Henry "Hotspur" Percy, Knight of the Garter

Sir Henry Percy, 4th Earl of Northumberland, KG

Sir Henry Algernon Percy, 5th Earl of Northumberland, KG

Sir Henry Percy, 6th Earl of Northumberland, KG

Sir Thomas Percy, 7th Earl of Northumberland, KG

Sir Henry Percy, 9th Earl of Northumberland, KG

Sir Algernon Percy, 10 Earl of Northumberland, KG

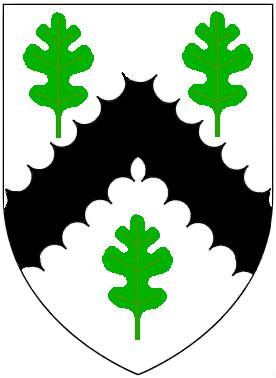
Arms of Smithson of Stanwick, Yorkshire (ancient): Argent, a chevron engrailed sable between three oak leaves erect slipped vert

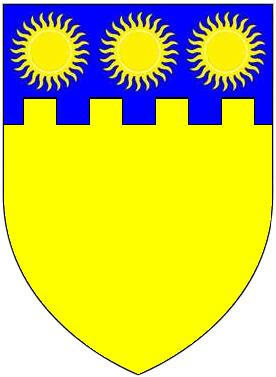
Augmented arms of Smithson Baronets of Stanwick to Sir Hugh Smithson, 1st Baronet by King Charles II of England for loyalty: Or, on a chief embattled azure three suns proper

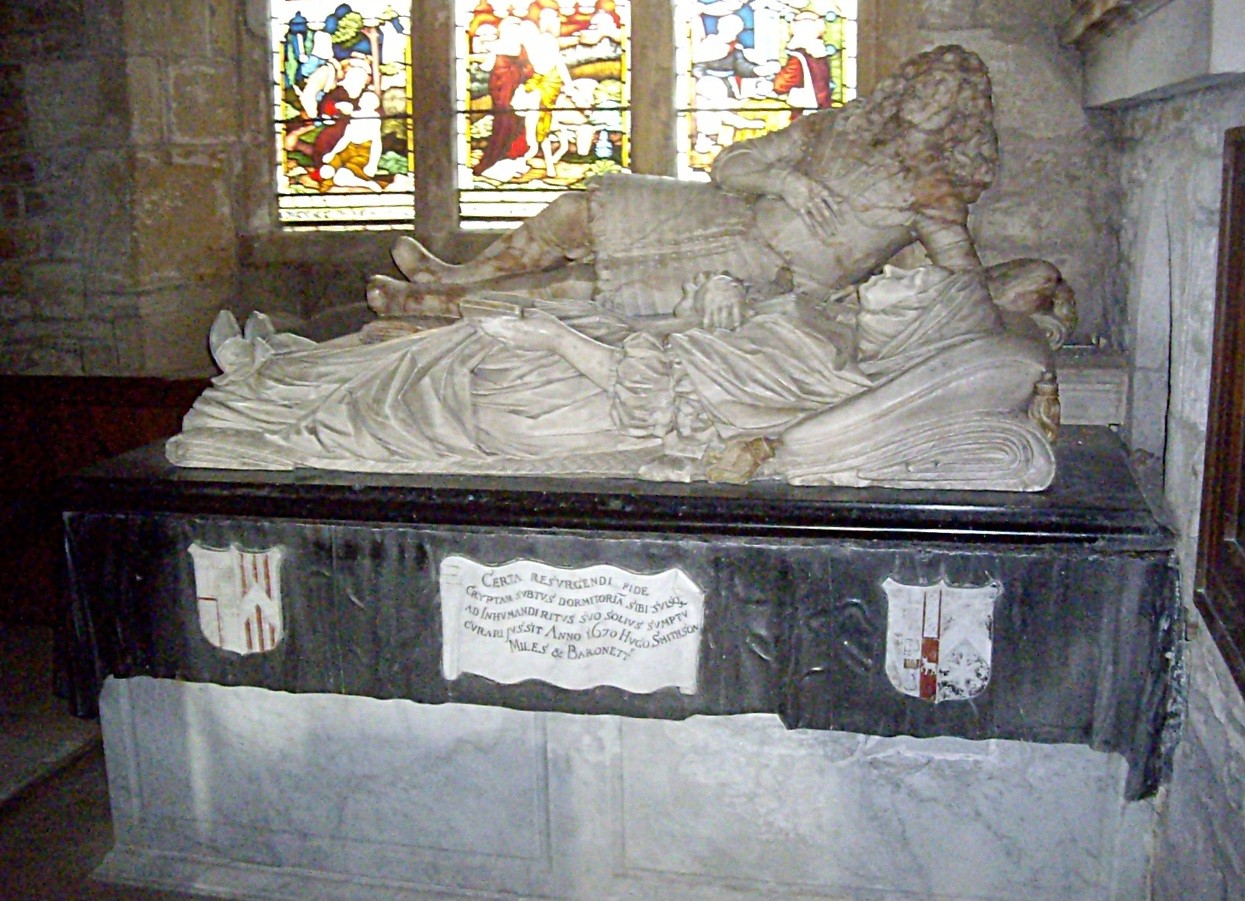
Monument of Sir Hugh Smithson, 1st Baronet (d. 1670), St John the Baptist's Church, Stanwick, Yorks.

Arms of Hugh (Smithson) Percy, 1st Duke of Northumberland.

Duke of Northumberland

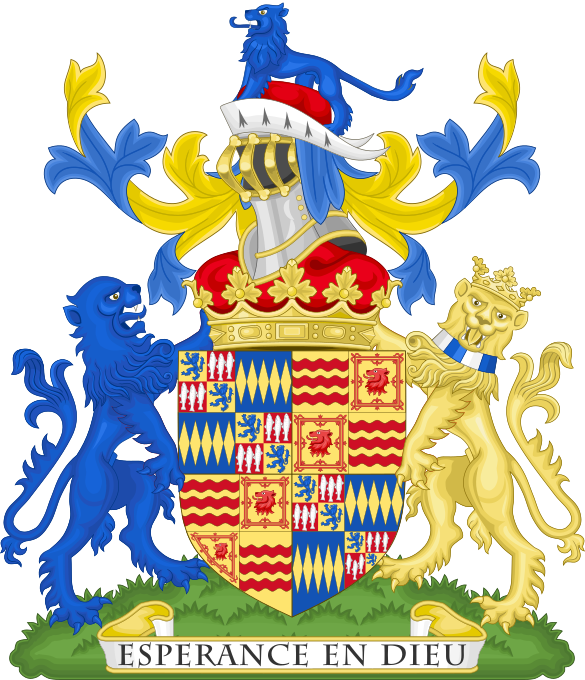
Current duke of Northumberland

== Buildings associated with the Percy family ==
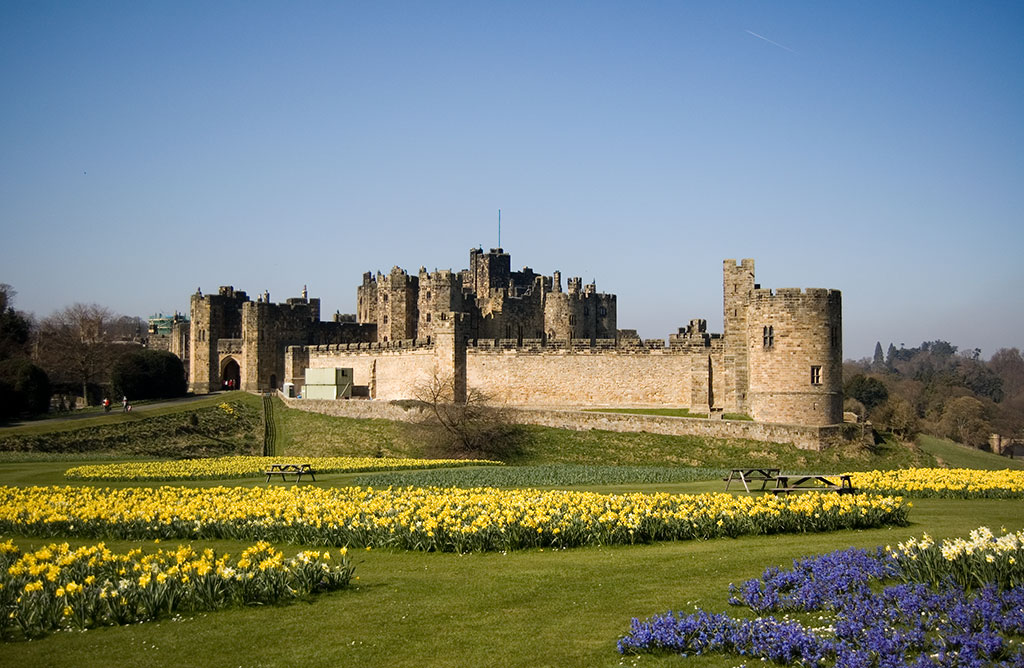
Alnwick Castle

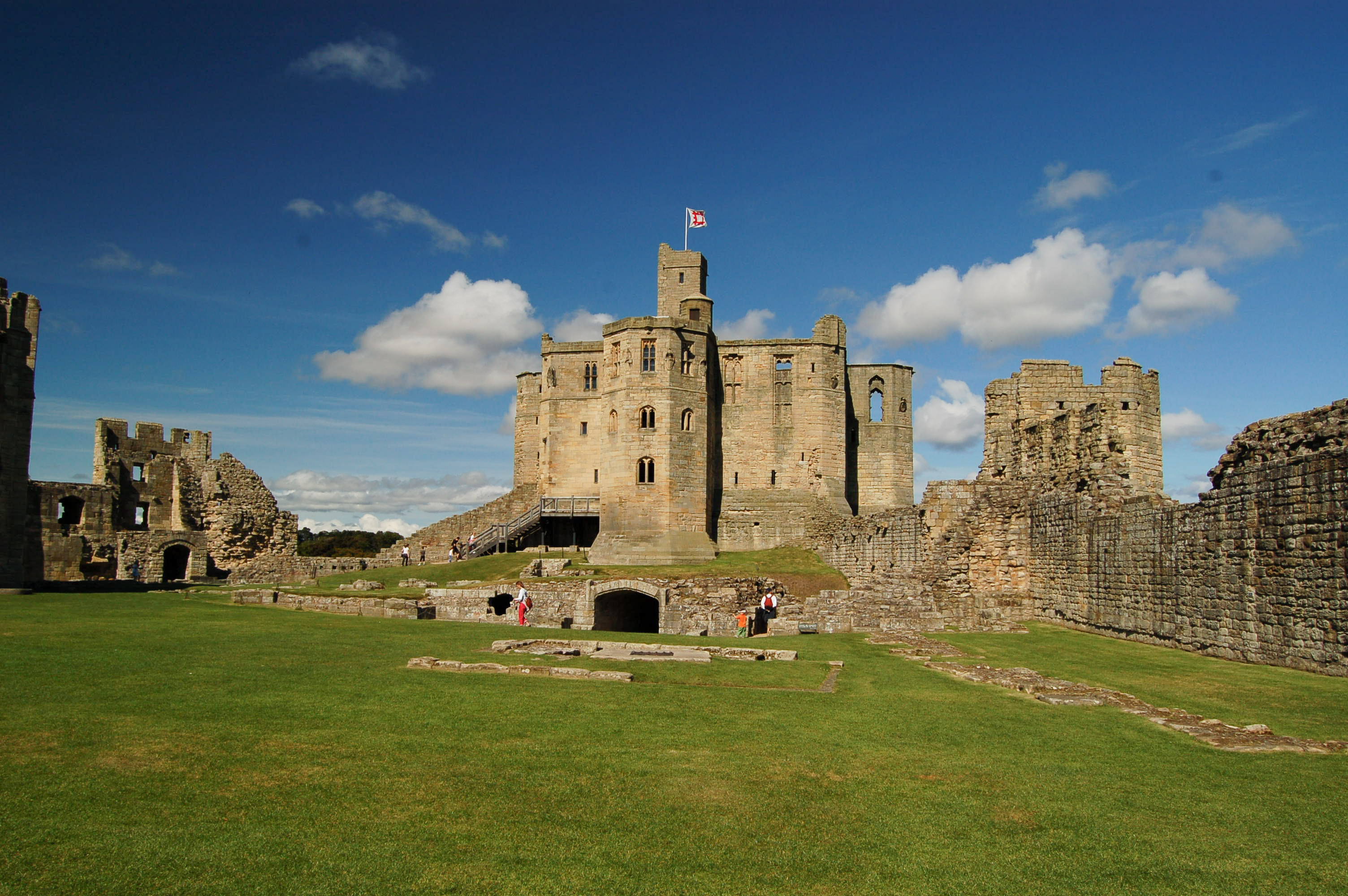
Warkworth Castle

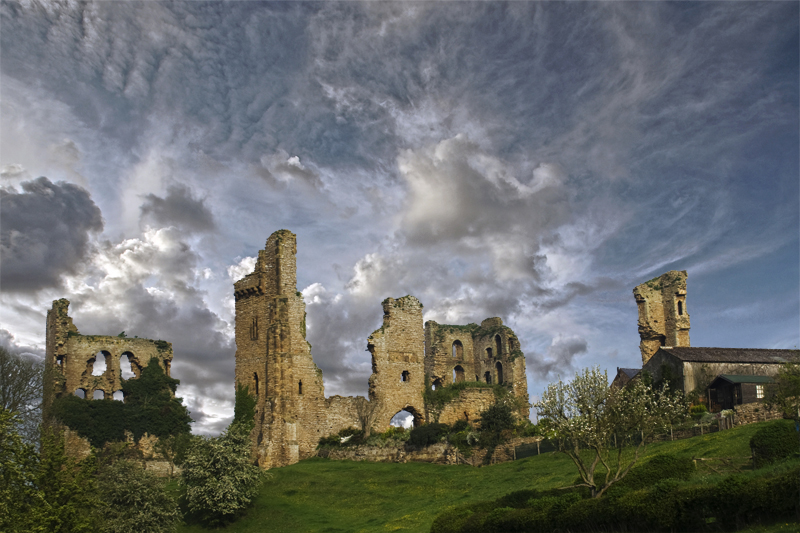
Sheriff Hutton Castle

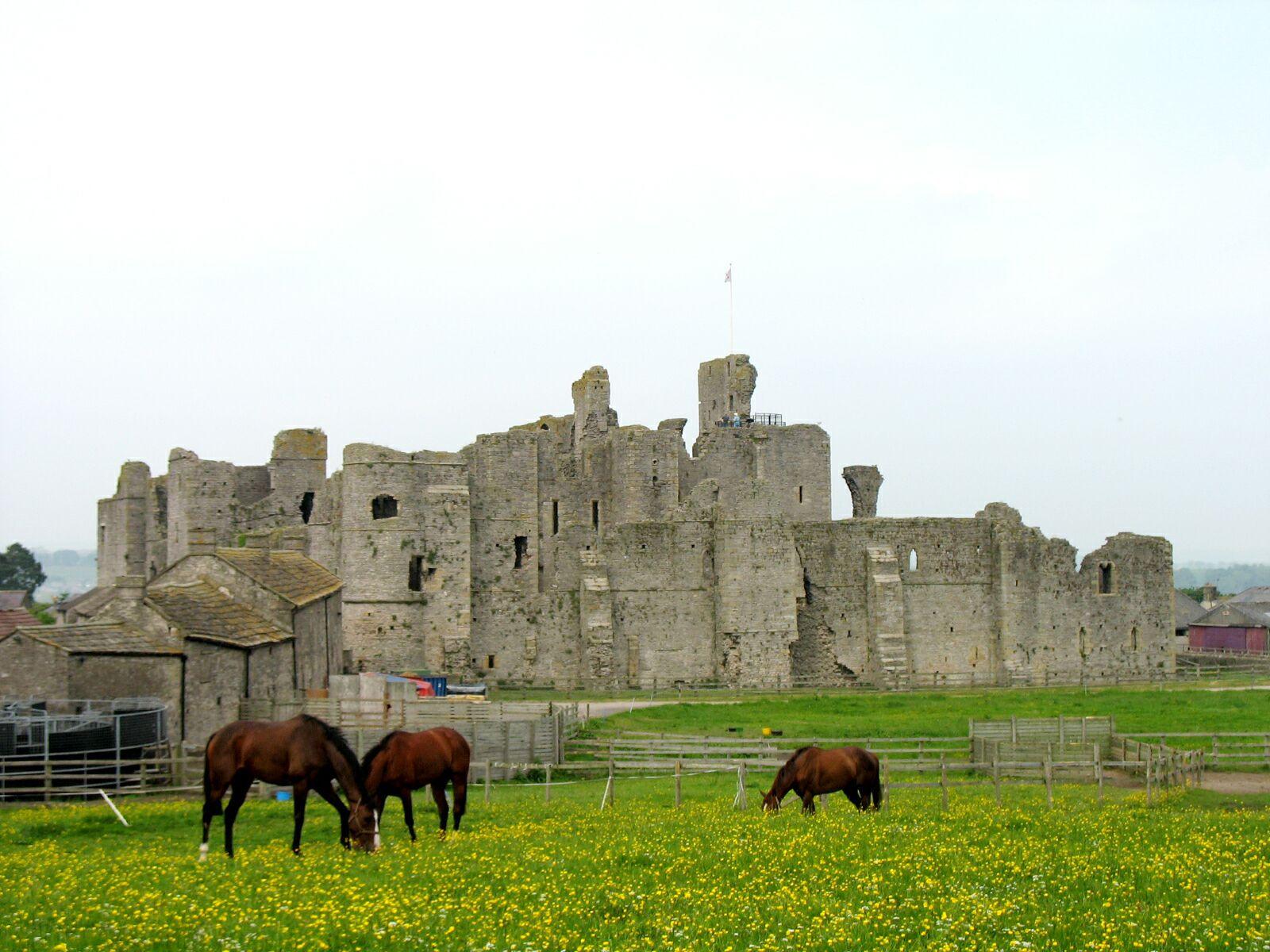
Middleham Castle

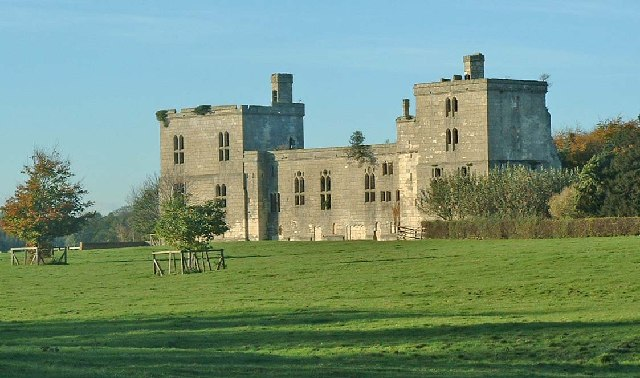
Wressle Castle
- Topcliffe Castle, Yorkshire, recorded in the Domesday Book of 1086 as held by William I de Percy (d. 1096), whom it served as the caput of the feudal barony of Topcliffe. The Percy family's most ancient English seat.
- Petworth, Sussex, acquired by Joscelin of Louvain (d. 1180), husband of Agnes de Percy, one of the two daughters and co-heiresses of William II de Percy (d. 1174–5), feudal baron of Topcliffe in Yorkshire (grandson of William I de Percy (d. 1096)). Jocelin's younger son Richard "de Percy" (d. 1244) adopted the surname "de Percy" and inherited his father's estate of Petworth and a moiety of his maternal barony of Topcliffe. Richard died without progeny when his estates descended to his nephew William III "de Percy" (1197–1245), grandson of Jocelin de Louvain, who had inherited the other moiety of Topcliffe from his great-aunt Maud de Percy.

Canting arms of Lucy of Cockermouth Castle: Gules, three lucies hauriant argent

- Alnwick Castle, Northumberland, purchased in 1309 by Henry de Percy, 1st Baron Percy (1273–1314) from Anthony Bek, Prince Bishop of Durham.
- Warkworth Castle, Northumberland
- Cockermouth Castle, Cumbria, inherited by Henry Percy, 1st Earl of Northumberland (1341–1408) and his heirs male, from his 2nd wife Maud de Lucy, sister and heiress of Anthony de Lucy, 3rd Baron Lucy (d. 1368), on condition that they should bear the arms of Lucy (Gules, three lucies hauriant argent) quarterly with their own.
- Egremont Castle, Cumbria, purchased in 1529 by Henry Percy, 15th Earl of Northumberland from Robert Radclyffe, 1st Earl of Sussex (1483–1542).
- Leconfield Castle, Yorkshire.
- Syon House, Isleworth, Middlesex, the former Syon Monastery, acquired in 1594 by Henry Percy, 9th Earl of Northumberland (1564–1632).

Following the death of his grandson Algernon Seymour, 7th Duke of Somerset in 1750, the former Percy estates were split between the Smithson ("Percy", Duke of Northumberland) and Wyndham (Earl of Egremont) families

== See also ==
- Percy (surname)
- Percy (given name)
- Percy (disambiguation)
