= Elizabeth Percy =

Elizabeth Percy may refer to:

- Elizabeth Mortimer, Lady Percy and Baroness Camoys (1371–1417)
- Lady Elizabeth Percy (1395–1436), wife of John Clifford, 7th Baron de Clifford and Ralph Neville, 2nd Earl of Westmorland
- Elizabeth Howard Percy, Countess of Northumberland (~1623–1705), wife of Algernon Percy, 10th Earl of Northumberland
- Elizabeth Capell, Countess of Essex (1636–1718), née Elizabeth Percy
- Elizabeth Percy, Countess of Northumberland (1646–1690)
- Elizabeth Seymour, Duchess of Somerset (1667–1722), née Elizabeth Percy
- Elizabeth Percy, Duchess of Northumberland (1716–1776)
- Elizabeth Douglas-Hamilton, Duchess of Hamilton (1916–2008), née Elizabeth Percy
- Elizabeth Percy, Duchess of Northumberland (1922–2012)
