= Baronies created by error =

Baronies in England and Ireland awarded in error

Several baronies created by error exist or have existed in the Peerage of England and the Peerage of Ireland. The usual type of error was perpetrated in the Committee on Privileges of the British House of Lords, whether by the Committee itself or by a clerk, in mistaking the origins of a dormant, abeyant, or extinct title, and in awarding that title to a person who was not the heir to that peerage. Such mistakes are rare.

One such error was made when the barony of Wharton was conferred upon a claimant, believing that the barony had been created by writ of summons; however, the original barony had been created by letters patent to the heirs male of the original grantee. In this case, the original documentation had been lost. As a result, a new barony in the peerage of the United Kingdom was created by writ.

Similar errors were made for the Percy barony when the 7th Duke of Somerset was summoned to Parliament erroneously in 1722 as Baron Percy (in the belief that the 1299 barony had descended to his mother), and the Strange barony created in 1628 for the 7th Earl of Derby by error. Another example is the barony of Clifford created by the writ of summons to Henry Clifford in 1628: this was intended as a writ of acceleration in the belief that the Baron de Clifford title created in 1299 was held by his father Francis Clifford, 4th Earl of Cumberland. Similarly, the title Baron Powlett of Basing was created by error in 1717 when a clerk incorrectly recorded the name of the subsidiary title (Baron St John (of Basing)) of the Duke of Bolton when executing a writ of acceleration to summon the Marquess of Winchester.

Since the early 20th century, the Committee on Privileges has been reluctant to revive older English baronies on various grounds, and thus opportunities for new baronies to be created by clerical error or failure in research are rare.

== Other errors ==
The most famous error made by the House of Lords in awarding a title was not in the case of a barony, but for the Scottish earldom of Mar which was awarded to a distant collateral heir male of a previous earl, and not to the heir general, as customary under Scottish peerage law. This 1875 Committee finding declared that a separate Scottish earldom with remainder to heirs male had been created in 1565, and in 1885 an Act of Parliament revived the ancient title for the heir general. As a result, there are two peers holding the Mar title today; the Countess of Mar (holder of the oldest surviving Scottish peerage) and the Earl of Mar and Kellie.

The most common errors are made in the spelling of a title as granted in letters patent.

This category does not include baronies such as the very old English Barony de Ros or the Barony of Hastings that were awarded to persons who were not the senior heir (or co-heir) general. Nor does it include baronies that were not awarded at all to the claimant, for various other reasons.
