= Josceline Percy, 11th Earl of Northumberland =

English peer (1644–1670)

Josceline Percy
- Earl of Northumberland
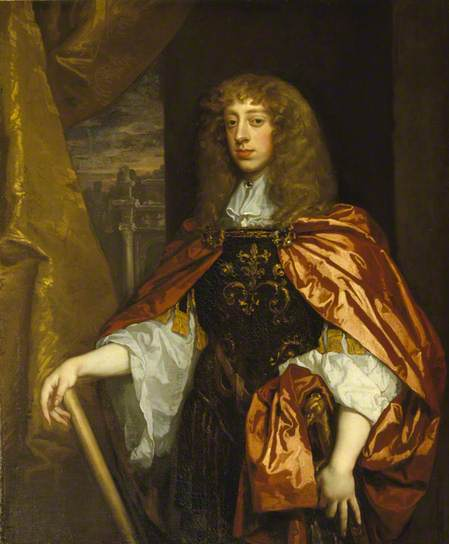
- Josceline Percy, 11th Earl of Northumberland, portrait c.1670/1673 by Sir Peter Lely (1618–1680), collection of National Trust, Petworth House
- Born: 4 July 1644
- Died: 31 May 1670 (aged 25)
- Noble family: House of Percy
- Spouse: Lady Elizabeth Wriothesley (m. 1662)
- Issue: Henry Percy, Lord Percy; Lady Elizabeth Percy
- Father: Algernon Percy, 10th Earl of Northumberland
- Mother: Elizabeth Howard

Josceline (or Joceline) Percy, 11th Earl of Northumberland, 5th Baron Percy (4 July 1644 – 31 May 1670), of Alnwick Castle, Northumberland and Petworth House, Sussex, was an English peer.

== Origins ==
Percy was the eldest son of Algernon Percy, 10th Earl of Northumberland (1602–1668), by his second wife, Elizabeth Howard, daughter of Theophilus Howard, 2nd Earl of Suffolk (1584–1640).

== Career ==
He served as a Page of Honour at the coronation of Charles II on 23 April 1661 and on 4 November 1661 entered the Inner Temple for legal training.

== Marriage and children ==
On 23 December 1662 he married Lady Elizabeth Wriothesley, 3rd daughter and co-heiress of Thomas Wriothesley, 4th Earl of Southampton, by whom he had children as follows:

- Henry Percy, Lord Percy (1668–1669), only son and heir apparent, who died in infancy.
- Lady Elizabeth Percy (1667–1722), sole daughter and heiress, wife of Charles Seymour, 6th Duke of Somerset (1662–1748).

== Principal estates ==
- Topcliffe Castle, Yorkshire, recorded in the Domesday Book of 1086 as held by William de Percy (died 1096), whom it served as the caput of the feudal barony of Topcliffe. The Percy family's most ancient English seat.
- Petworth House, Sussex, acquired by Joscelin of Louvain (died 1180), husband of Agnes de Percy, one of the two daughters and co-heiresses of William de Percy (died 1174/5), feudal baron of Topcliffe in Yorkshire (grandson of William de Percy (died 1096)). Jocelin's younger son Richard "de Percy" (died 1244) adopted the surname "de Percy" and inherited his father's estate of Petworth and a moiety of his maternal barony of Topcliffe. Richard died without children when his estates descended to his nephew William "de Percy" (1197–1245), grandson of Jocelin de Louvain, who had inherited the other moiety of Topcliffe from his great-aunt Maud de Percy.

Canting arms of Lucy of Cockermouth Castle: Gules, three lucies hauriant argent

- Alnwick Castle, Northumberland, purchased in 1309 by Henry de Percy, 1st Baron Percy (1273–1314) from Anthony Bek, Prince Bishop of Durham.
- Warkworth Castle, Northumberland
- Cockermouth Castle, Cumbria, inherited by Henry Percy, 1st Earl of Northumberland (1341–1408) and his heirs male, from his 2nd wife Maud de Lucy, sister and heiress of Anthony de Lucy, 3rd Baron Lucy (died 1368), on condition that they should bear the arms of Lucy (Gules, three lucies hauriant argent) quarterly with their own.
- Egremont Castle, Cumbria, purchased in 1529 by Henry Percy, 5th Earl of Northumberland from Robert Radclyffe, 1st Earl of Sussex (1483–1542).
- Leconfield Castle, Yorkshire.
- Syon House, Isleworth, Middlesex, the former Syon Monastery, acquired in 1594 by Henry Percy, 9th Earl of Northumberland (1564–1632).

Following the death of his grandson Algernon Seymour, 7th Duke of Somerset in 1750, the former Percy estates were split between the Smithson (later "Percy", Duke of Northumberland) and Wyndham (Earl of Egremont) families.

== Death and succession ==
Following his death in 1670, without a male heir, the earl's titles became extinct and his estates reverted to the Crown. King Charles II awarded the estates to his (illegitimate) son, the Duke of Monmouth. The Countess of Northumberland successfully sued for the estates to be returned to the late Earl's only daughter and sole heiress, Lady Elizabeth Percy (1667–1722).

Lady Elizabeth married Charles Seymour, 6th Duke of Somerset (1662–1748), thus forming one of the most wealthy couples in England. The title Earl of Northumberland was re-created in 1748 for his daughter's son Algernon Seymour, 7th Duke of Somerset (1684–1750), with special remainder to the latter's son-in-law Sir Hugh Smithson, 4th Baronet (1715–1786), later created Duke of Northumberland, who changed his surname to Percy and inherited the ancient Percy seat of Alnwick Castle. The 7th Duke of Somerset was also created Earl of Egremont in 1749, with special remainder to his nephew Sir Charles Wyndham, 4th Baronet (1710–1763), who inherited the other part of the Percy estates, namely Petworth House in Sussex and Egremont Castle in Cumbria.

Honorary titles
English Interregnum	Lord Lieutenant of Northumberland jointly with The Earl of Northumberland 1660–1668; 1660–1670	Succeeded by The Duke of Newcastle-upon-Tyne
Preceded by The Earl of Southampton	Custos Rotulorum of Hampshire; 1667–1670	Succeeded by The Marquess of Winchester
Preceded by The Earl of Northumberland	Lord Lieutenant of Sussex; 1668–1670	Succeeded by The Earl of Dorset; Lord Buckhurst
Preceded by The Earl of Northumberland	Custos Rotulorum of Sussex; 1668–1670	Succeeded by The Earl of Dorset
Peerage of England
Preceded by Algernon Percy	Earl of Northumberland; 1668–1670	Extinct
