= Henry Percy, 9th Earl of Northumberland =

English nobleman (1564–1632)

Henry Percy
- Earl of Northumberland
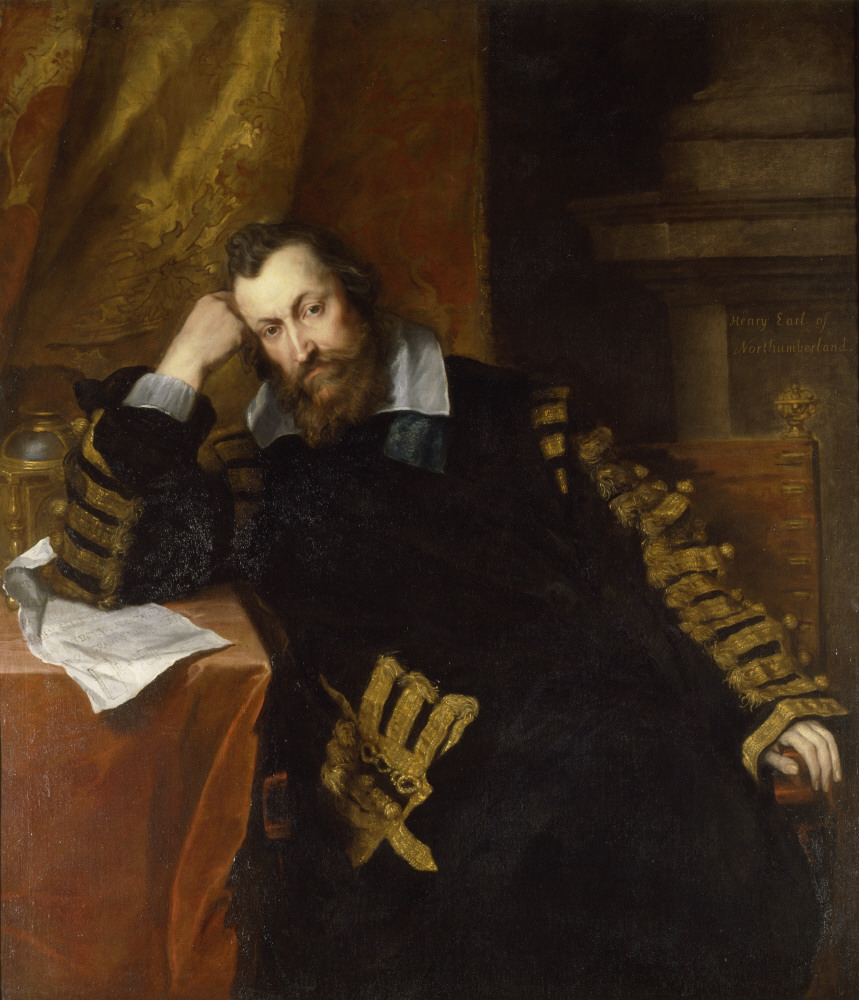
- Born: 27 April 1564; Tynemouth Castle, Northumberland, Kingdom of England
- Died: 5 November 1632 (aged 68); Petworth House, Sussex, Kingdom of England
- Noble family: Percy
- Spouse: Lady Dorothy Devereux (m. 1594; died 1619)
- Issue: Lady Dorothy Percy; Lady Lucy Percy; Algernon Percy, 10th Earl of Northumberland; Henry Percy
- Father: Henry Percy, 8th Earl of Northumberland
- Mother: Katherine Neville

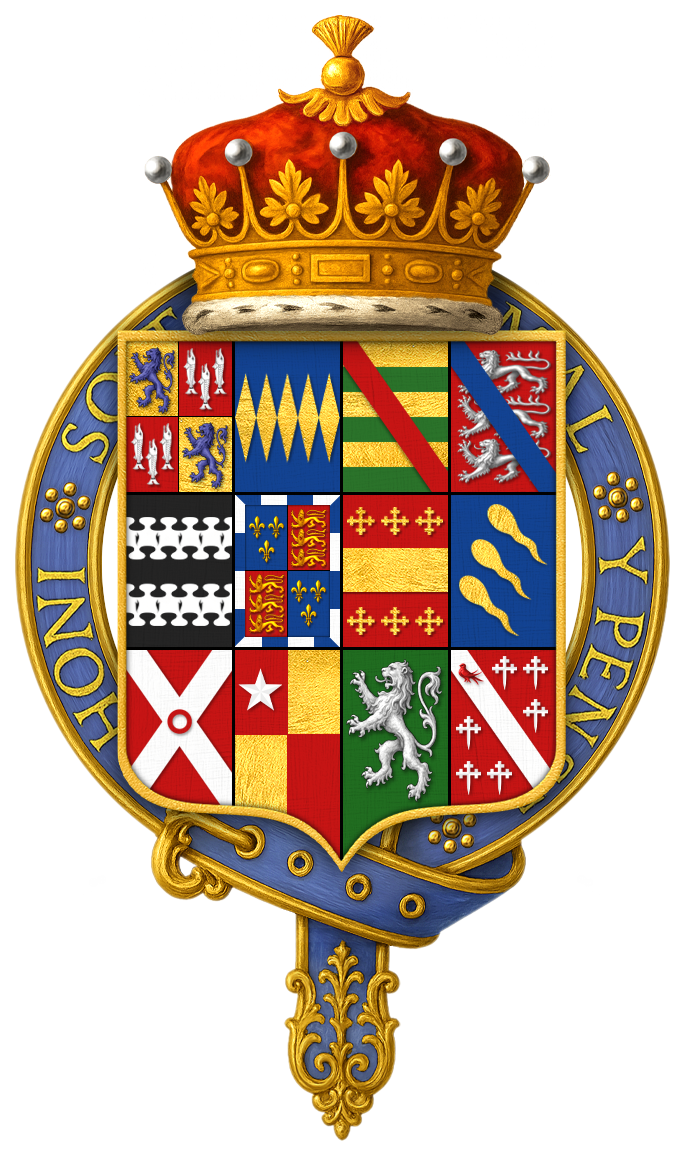
Quartered arms of Henry Percy, 9th Earl of Northumberland, KG (as displayed on his Garter stallplate in St. George's chapel)

Henry Percy, 9th Earl of Northumberland, KG (27 April 1564 – 5 November 1632) was an English nobleman. He was a grandee and one of the wealthiest peers of the court of Elizabeth I. Under James I, Northumberland was a long-term prisoner in the Tower of London, due to the suspicion that he was complicit in the Gunpowder Plot. He is known for the circles he moved in as well as for his own achievements. He acquired the sobriquet The Wizard Earl (also given to Gerald FitzGerald, 11th Earl of Kildare), from his scientific and alchemical experiments, his passion for cartography, and his large library.

== Early life and marriage ==
He was born at Tynemouth Castle in Northumberland, the son of Henry Percy, 8th Earl of Northumberland, whom he succeeded in 1585. His father died, an apparent suicide, in the Tower of London, where he was being questioned about his allegedly treasonable dealings with Mary, Queen of Scots. His mother was Katherine Neville, daughter and co-heiress of John Neville, 4th Baron Latimer and Lucy Somerset. She remarried Francis Fitton of Binfield.

He was brought up a Protestant, as his father had been, taking instruction from the vicar of Egremont. This did not prevent suspicions in later life, particularly when he associated with Charles Paget, that he was a crypto-Catholic. Around 1586, he first employed the artist Nicolas Hilliard, paying 60 shillings for his portrait. In 1598 he bought a jewel called the "Rainbow" for £21 from John Spilman. The earl had an African servant who was called the "Blackamore" in his accounts. This servant was brought to the earl in 1586 by Mr Crosse's servant, who was rewarded with 20 shillings, and the earl bought new clothes for the African servant costing £6-12s-6d. New shoes in 1588 cost 18 pence.

Although his earldom was in the north of England, Northumberland also had estates in the south at Petworth House in Sussex and at Syon House in Middlesex, acquired by his marriage to Lady Dorothy Devereux (sister of Robert Devereux, 2nd Earl of Essex) in 1594.

They had four children:

- Lady Dorothy Percy (c. 1598 – 20 August 1659); married Robert Sidney, 2nd Earl of Leicester, by whom she had six children.
- Lady Lucy Percy (1599/1600 – 5 November 1660); married, as his second wife, James Hay, 1st Earl of Carlisle.
- Algernon Percy, 10th Earl of Northumberland (29 September 1602 – 13 October 1668); married, firstly, Anne Cecil, by whom he had five daughters, including Elizabeth Percy, Countess of Essex; he married, secondly, Lady Elizabeth Howard, by whom he had his heir, Joceline Percy, 11th Earl of Northumberland.
- Henry Percy, Baron Percy of Alnwick (1604 – April 1659); died unmarried.

Though it did produce a male heir, Algernon, the marriage was not successful, and the couple separated after a time, despite efforts by the Queen, who was fond of Dorothy, to reconcile them.

== Catholic sympathiser ==
The Percy family was still largely Catholic, while Northumberland was at least nominally Protestant. When it became clear that the Protestant James VI of Scotland was likely to succeed Elizabeth, Northumberland sent his cousin Thomas Percy, a recent Catholic convert, on a secret mission to James's court three times in 1602. He said that English Catholics would accept James as king if he reduced the persecution of Catholics. Northumberland employed Thomas Percy as a rent collector at Syon House. Thomas was the great-grandson of Henry Percy, 4th Earl of Northumberland, but was unscrupulous, with 34 charges of dishonesty brought against him. Henry wrote to James "It were a pity to lose a good Kingdom for not tolerating a mass in a corner". Through Thomas Percy, Henry received loosely worded assurances of religious tolerance from James.

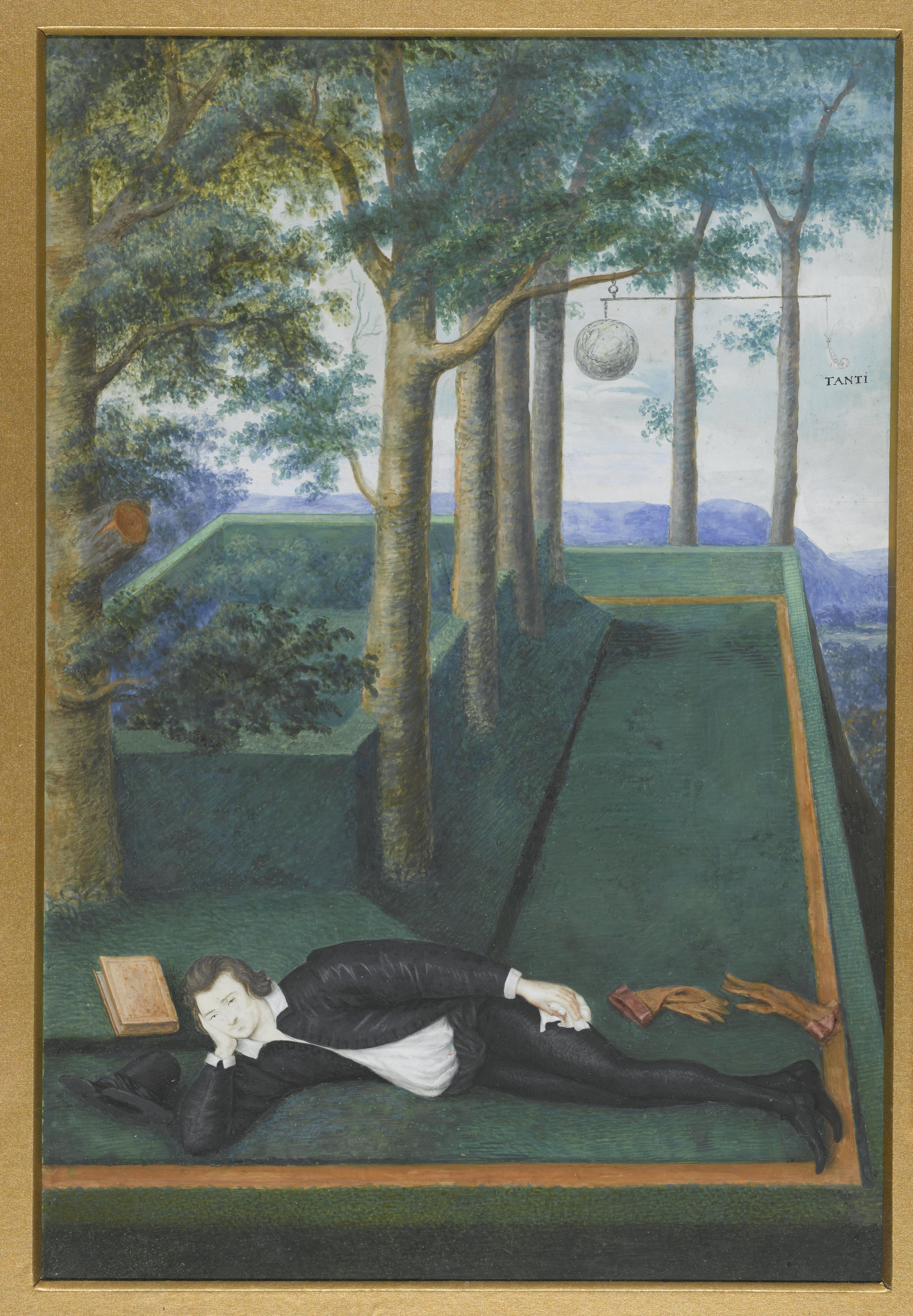
Large portrait miniature by Nicholas Hilliard, 1590–95

Shortly before James's accession to the English throne in 1603, Robert Cecil, 1st Earl of Salisbury through Lord Henry Howard particularly warned the King against Henry Brooke, 11th Baron Cobham, Sir Walter Raleigh, and Northumberland. This theory of the "diabolical triplicity" rested on innuendo, about the occult interests supposedly cultivated by the intellectual circles led by Percy and Raleigh, and possibly on the traitorous intent suggested only by rumours from the 1580s that Percy would marry Arbella Stuart, the next heir to the throne after the King and his offspring. Brooke led the Main Plot against James, and Raleigh soon lost his freedom. Northumberland, on the other hand, was appointed to the Privy Council.

The Earl of Northumberland bought Walsingham House in London's Seething Lane for £2,200 in 1603. In 1604, the house was visited by the Jesuit Henry Garnet and the Spanish ambassador Juan de Tassis, 1st Count of Villamediana.

Thomas Percy went on to become one of the five conspirators in the Gunpowder Plot of 1605, aiming to overthrow the Parliament under King James I. When the plot was discovered, Percy fled and was besieged at Holbeche House in Warwickshire. On 8 November 1605, a marksman shot dead both Robert Catesby and Thomas Percy with a single bullet.

The Earl of Northumberland was suspected of misprision (having knowledge of the plot but not notifying the authorities). However, the Star Chamber did not have sufficient evidence to convict him of misprision and was unable to disprove his claim that he planned to be present at the fatal meeting of Parliament. They had to resort to more minor charges including his appointment of Thomas Percy to the Gentlemen Pensioners, of which Northumberland was captain, without the King's permission and without Percy taking the Oath of Supremacy. Northumberland was sent to the Tower of London at the king's pleasure and remained there for almost 16 years. He was also fined £30,000, equivalent to £7,800,000 in 2025, but in 1613, the King accepted £11,000 in final payment.

== In the Tower ==
Still a rich man, Northumberland made himself comfortable in the Tower of London. He had spacious apartments in the Martin Tower, which he redecorated and refurbished. He was attended by 20 servants, some of whom he lodged on Tower Hill. He spent £50 per year on books and grew a considerable library. He had his own covered bowling alley and access to facilities for tennis and fencing. He regularly met scholars whom he patronised, including Thomas Harriot, Walter Warner and Robert Hues, who were known as the "Earl of Northumberland's Magi". Together with Sir Walter Raleigh, who had preceded Northumberland to the Tower with a death sentence hanging over him, they discussed advanced scientific ideas and smoked tobacco.

From 1616, Robert Carr, 1st Earl of Somerset and Frances Carr, Countess of Somerset were inmates of the Tower and on social terms with Northumberland. Frances promoted the marriage of his second daughter Lucy Percy to James Hay, 1st Earl of Carlisle. He disapproved of the proposed marriage ,saying that he would not see his daughter "dance to a Scotch jig." For a period, he forced Lucy to reside with him in the Tower but Frances outwitted him. Despite Northumberland's extreme disapproval of the marriage, Hay was determined to win his father-in-law's respect and fought for Northumberland's release from the Tower, which was achieved in July 1621.

After his release, experiencing deafness and poor eyesight, he went to the Bath Inn, later referred to as the Arundel House, to regain his health. Once recovered Northumberland retired to Petworth House where he remained until his death on 5 November 1632.

His wife died in 1619.

== Intellectual interests and associates ==
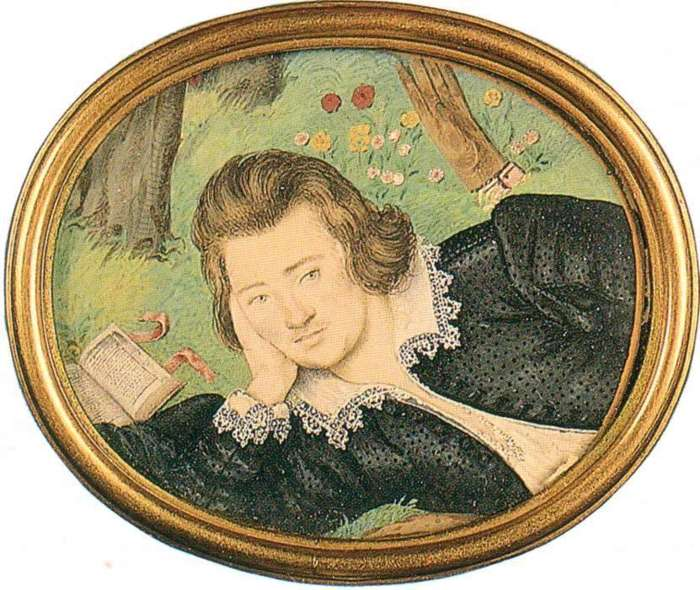
Peele wrote a poem The Honour of the Garter, dedicated to Northumberland and for the occasion of his admission to the Order of the Garter, on 26 June 1593.

Because of his interest in scientific experiments and his library, Northumberland acquired the nickname "The Wizard Earl". The library was one of the largest in England at the time. He was a patron to Thomas Harriot, Nicholas Hill, Robert Hues, Nathaniel Torporley and Walter Warner. The astrologer John Dee, nearby Syon House at Mortlake, was also a friend of Henry, and their circles overlapped.

Harriot had been a navigational tutor to Raleigh and his captains. From 1598 (or possibly from 1607) Harriot lived at Syon House. There he used a telescope to make a map of the Moon several months before Galileo did the same. He may have been the first person to observe sunspots.

Northumberland had also connections to the literati. George Peele wrote a poem, The Honour of the Garter, dedicated to Percy and for the occasion of his admission to the Order of the Garter, on 26 June 1593. For his efforts Peele was paid £3. Christopher Marlowe claimed his acquaintance and certainly moved in the same group. Percy was a friend to John Donne. After Donne's elopement and clandestine marriage in 1601, he had the task of taking a letter for him to the new father-in-law, Sir George More.

In William Shakespeare's Love's Labour's Lost (1594), there is a mention of the "School of Night". It has been argued that this refers to a circle of scientific investigators who met at Syon House, though other commentators think the word "school" is a misprint for something like "shawl". Since Percy was often considered to be an atheist, the "school" was sometimes referred to as the "School of Atheism". Raleigh was the supposed leader and Thomas Harriot and Marlowe were supposedly members. Frances Yates comments on this hypothetical group, supposedly including also George Chapman as the author of Shadow of Night, as arguably part of Raleigh's circle, to the effect that they would be "Saturnians" in the sense of her study.

== Notes ==
Honorary titles
Preceded by The Lord Hunsdon	Captain of the Gentlemen Pensioners; 1603–1615	Succeeded by The Earl of Suffolk
Peerage of England
Preceded by Henry Percy	Earl of Northumberland; 1585–1632	Succeeded by Algernon Percy
Preceded by Henry Percy	Baron Percy (descended by acceleration); 1585–1626	Succeeded by Algernon Percy
