= Richard de Percy =

Anglo-Norman nobleman

Coat of arms of Richard de Percy, Baron

Sir Richard de Percy (c. 1170–1244), 5th Baron Percy, was a Magnate from the North of England, and a participant in the First Barons' War.

He was the son of Agnes de Perci, suo jure Baroness Percy, the heiress of the Percy estates, and her husband Joscelin of Louvain (1121–1180), who was styled "brother of the queen" (referring to Adeliza of Louvain, second wife of Henry I). It is from this marriage descends the House of Percy, following the assumption of the name Percy by Louvain.

Percy was one of the twenty five barons appointed to enforce the observance of Magna Carta. Along with his nephew William (c. 1183–1245), latterly the 6th Baron Percy, he was amongst the lords who rose in arms against King John and his estates declared forfeit. Upon John's death Percy immediately made his peace with Henry III, and had his lands restored to him.

Baron Percy died in 1244, and is buried at Whitby Abbey.
