= William de Percy =

Norman feudal baron of Topcliffe in Yorkshire

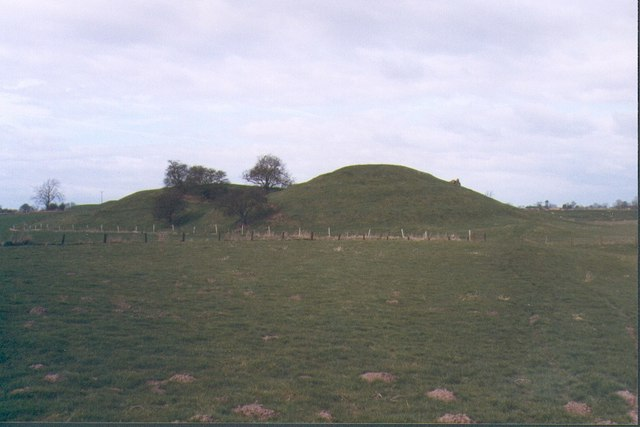
Remains of the motte of Topcliffe Castle, North Yorkshire, seat of William I de Percy

William I (Willame) de Percy (d. 1096/9), first feudal baron of Topcliffe in North Yorkshire, known as Willame als gernons (Old French, meaning 'with whiskers'), was a Norman nobleman who arrived in England immediately after the Norman Conquest of 1066. He was the founder via an early 13th-century female line of the powerful English House of Percy, Earls of Northumberland, and via an 18th-century female line of the Dukes of Northumberland.

== Origins ==
The Cartulary of Whitby Abbey states that Hugh d'Avranches (later first Earl of Chester) and William de Percy arrived in England in 1067, one year after the Norman Conquest.

It is possible that Percy had been one of the Normans to whom King Edward the Confessor had given lands, but who were later expelled by King Harold Godwinson (d. 1066). The term Als gernons ('bewhiskered'), may explain Percy's unusual Norman epithet, as the Normans were generally clean-shaven, unlike the English, and possibly Percy had assimilated the local custom. Later generations of Percys would use the sobriquet in the form of the first name "Algernon".

The name was taken from Percy, a fief near Villedieu in the Cotentin Peninsula in Normandy.

== Landholdings ==
He appears in the Domesday Book of 1086 as a great landowner, holding 30 knight's fees, including some lands which had belonged to a Saxon lady, whom, "as very heire to them, in discharging of his conscience", he afterwards married. Hugh Lupus, on becoming Earl of Chester, transferred to him his great estate of Whitby in the North Riding of Yorkshire, where he re-founded the Abbey of St. Hilda's, and appointed his brother Serlo de Percy the first prior.

== Consolidation ==
Following the rebellion of Gospatric Earl of Northumbria, and the subsequent Harrying of the North, much territory in northern England and the Earldom of Chester were granted to Hugh d'Avranches, who had been instrumental in the devastation. Percy in turn was granted territory by d'Avranches, in addition to those already held by him in-chief from the king. At the time of the Domesday Book of 1086, Percy held as a tenant-in-chief 118 manors in Lincolnshire and the North Riding of Yorkshire, with further lands in Essex and Hampshire.

== Building works ==
Percy set about fortifying his landholdings, constructing motte and bailey castles at Spofforth (Note: Paul Dalton, Lecturer in Medieval History, states that Spofforth Castle may date from the reign of William the Conqueror.) and at Topcliffe, (Note: Adam Pettifer states Topcliffe castle may have been built by William.) where was situated the caput of his feudal barony. He granted land to the Benedictine order and financed the construction of the new Whitby Abbey from amongst the ruins of the Anglo-Saxon Abbey of Streoneshalh.

== Marriage and progeny ==
Percy married an English noblewoman called Emma de Port, her epithet presumably came from her landholdings at Seamer, a once thriving manor in North Yorkshire. Possibly, the lands granted to Percy by the king were jure uxoris. By Emma de Porte, Percy had four sons:

- Alan de Percy (d.1130/5), 2nd feudal baron of Topcliffe, who married Emma de Ghent, daughter of Gilbert I de Ghent
- Walter de Percy
- William de Percy, 2nd Abbot of Whitby
- Richard de Percy of Dunsley, married Athaliza (Aaliza) who previously was married to Walter de Argentum

== Death on the First Crusade ==
Percy accompanied Robert Curthose, Duke of Normandy, on the First Crusade, where he died within sight of Jerusalem. His body was buried at Antioch, and his heart was returned to England and was buried in Whitby Abbey.

== Sources ==
- Brenan, Gerald (1902). Lindsay, W.A. (ed.). A History of the House of Percy. Vol. I. Freemantle & Co.
- Brenan, Gerald (1902a). Lindsay, W.A. (ed.). A History of the House of Percy. Vol. II. Freemantle & Co.
- Dalton, Paul (2002). Conquest, Anarchy and Lordship Yorkshire, 1066–1154. Cambridge University Press.
- Douglas, David Charles (1964). William the Conqueror: The Norman Impact Upon England. University of California Press.
- Farrer, William, ed. (2013). Early Yorkshire Charters. Vol. 2. Cambridge University Press.
- Keats-Rohan, K. S. B. (2002). Domesday Descendants: A Prosopography of Persons Occurring in English Documents 1066–1166. Vol. II Pipe Rolls to Cartae Baronum. The Boydell Press.
- Pettifer, Adrian (1995). English Castles: A Guide by Counties. The Boydell Press.
- Rhodes, Walter Eustace (1917). "Percy". In Stephen, Leslie; Lee, Sidney (eds.). The Dictionary of National Biography. Vol. XV: Owens-Pockrich. Oxford University Press.
- Sanders, I.J. (1960). English Baronies. Clarendon Press.
- Atkinson, John Christopher (1878). Cartularium abbathiæ de Whiteby ordinis S. Benedicti fundatæ anno MLXXVIII (1st ed.). Surtees Society.
