= Elizabeth Percy, Duchess of Northumberland (1716–1776) =

British duchess; Lady of the Bedchamber (1716–1776)

Her Grace The Duchess of Northumberland
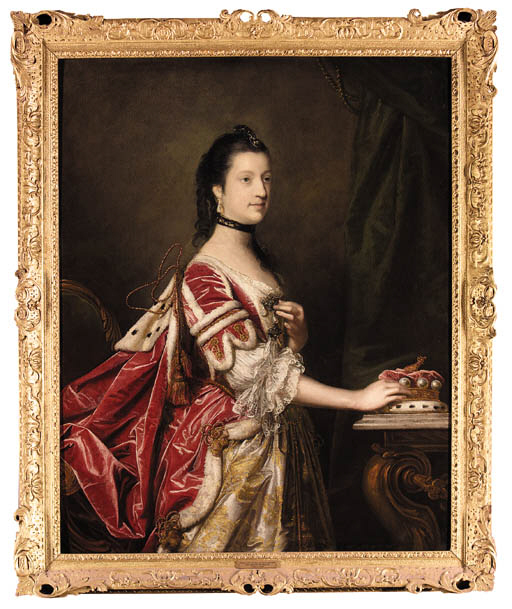
- Portrait by Sir Joshua Reynolds, c. 1761

Lady of the Bedchamber
- In office 1761–1770

Personal details
- Born: 5 December 1716
- Died: 5 December 1776 (aged 60)
- Resting place: Northumberland Vault, Westminster Abbey
- Spouse: Hugh Percy, 1st Duke of Northumberland (m. 1740)
- Relations: Charles Seymour, 6th Duke of Somerset (grandfather); Lady Elizabeth Percy (grandmother)
- Children: Lady Elizabeth Percy; Hugh Percy, 2nd Duke of Northumberland; Algernon Percy, 1st Earl of Beverley
- Parents: Algernon Seymour, 7th Duke of Somerset; Frances Thynne
- Occupation: Lady of the Bedchamber to Queen Charlotte

Elizabeth Percy, Duchess of Northumberland (née Seymour; 5 December 1716 – 5 December 1776), also suo jure 2nd Baroness Percy, was a British peer.

== Life ==
Percy was the only daughter of Algernon Seymour, 7th Duke of Somerset, and his wife, Frances, daughter of Henry Thynne. Her grandparents were Charles Seymour, 6th Duke of Somerset and the great heiress Lady Elizabeth Percy.

On 29 July 1740, she married Sir Hugh Smithson, Bt, and they had two sons, Hugh (1742–1817) and Algernon (1750–1830). On her father's death in 1750, she inherited his barony of Percy and her husband acquired from her father his earldom of Northumberland by special remainder and changed his family name from Smithson to Percy that year. Sir Hugh's illegitimate son James Smithson, otherwise Jacques Louis Macie, born in about 1764 to one of Elizabeth's cousins, bequeathed the fortune which established the Smithsonian Institution.

In 1761, Percy became a Lady of the Bedchamber to Queen Charlotte, a post she held until 1770. She became a duchess in 1766 when her husband was created Duke of Northumberland, and on her death in 1776, aged sixty, her barony and the earldom of Northumberland passed to her eldest son, Hugh, who inherited his father's dukedom ten years later. He built Brizlee Tower in Hulne Park as one of a number of monuments to commemorate her.

Their children were:

- Lady Elizabeth Percy, who died unmarried
- General Hugh Percy, 2nd Duke of Northumberland (1742–1817)
- Algernon Percy, 1st Earl of Beverley (1750–1830). Letters dating from the first half of the 1750s from Elizabeth to her mother see her refer affectionately to Algernon as "our little monkey".

Elizabeth Percy is buried in the Northumberland Vault, within Westminster Abbey. Her epitaph describes her as having "every amiable & benevolent virtue", and as "an ornament of courts, an honour to her country, & patern to the great, a protectress of the poor, ever distinguished for the most tender affection for her family & friends". The monument was erected by her husband, who is described as "inconsolable".

In 1775, her diary of her travels in the Dutch Republic, called "A Short Tour made in the Year One Thousand Seven Hundred and Seventy One" was published, although anonymously. Extracts from her lively, entertaining and historically informative diary were published in 1936.

The National Portrait Gallery holds several mezzotints based on portraits of the duchess by Sir Joshua Reynolds. A watercolour portrait by Richard Gibson is held by the Fitzwilliam Museum, Cambridge.

Horace Walpole wrote,

"The Countess of Northumberland was a jovial heap of contradictions. The blood of all the Percies and Seymours swelled in her veins and in her fancy; while her person was more vulgar than anything but her conversation, which was larded indiscriminately with stories of her ancestors and her footmen. Show, and crowds, and junketting, were her endless pursuits. She was familiar with the mob, while stifled with diamonds; and yet was attentive to the most minute privileges of her rank, while almost shaking hands with a cobbler. Nothing was more mean than her assiduity about the King and Queen, whom she termed her Master and Mistress; and yet, though indirectly reprimanded by the latter, she persisted in following her Majesty to the theatres with a longer retinue of domestics than waited on the Queen herself. She had revived the drummers and pipers and obsolete minstrels of her family; and her own buxom countenance at the tail of such a procession, gave it all the air of an antiquated pageant or mumming. She was mischievous under the appearance of frankness; generous and friendly without delicacy or sentiment."

== Ancestry ==
Ancestors of Elizabeth Percy, Duchess of Northumberland

16. Francis Seymour, 1st Baron Seymour of Trowbridge
8. Charles Seymour, 2nd Baron Seymour of Trowbridge
17. Frances Prinne
4. Charles Seymour, 6th Duke of Somerset
18. William Alington, 1st Baron Alington
9. Hon. Elizabeth Alington
19. Elizabeth Tollemache
2. Algernon Seymour, 7th Duke of Somerset
20. Algernon Percy, 10th Earl of Northumberland
10. Josceline Percy, 11th Earl of Northumberland
21. Lady Elizabeth Howard
5. Lady Elizabeth Percy
22. Thomas Wriothesley, 4th Earl of Southampton
11. Lady Elizabeth Wriothesley
23. Lady Elizabeth Leigh
Elizabeth Seymour, Duchess of Northumberland
24. Sir Henry Frederick Thynne
12. Thomas Thynne, 1st Viscount Weymouth
25. Hon. Mary Coventry
6. Henry Thynne
26. Heneage Finch, 3rd Earl of Winchilsea
13. Lady Frances Finch
27. Lady Mary Seymour
3. Frances Thynne
14. Sir George Strode
7. Grace Strode
15. Grace FitzJames

Peerage of Great Britain
Preceded by Algernon Seymour	Baroness Percy; 1750–1776	Succeeded by Hugh Percy
