= Algernon Seymour, 7th Duke of Somerset =

British Army officer and politician (1684–1750)

General His Grace The Duke of Somerset
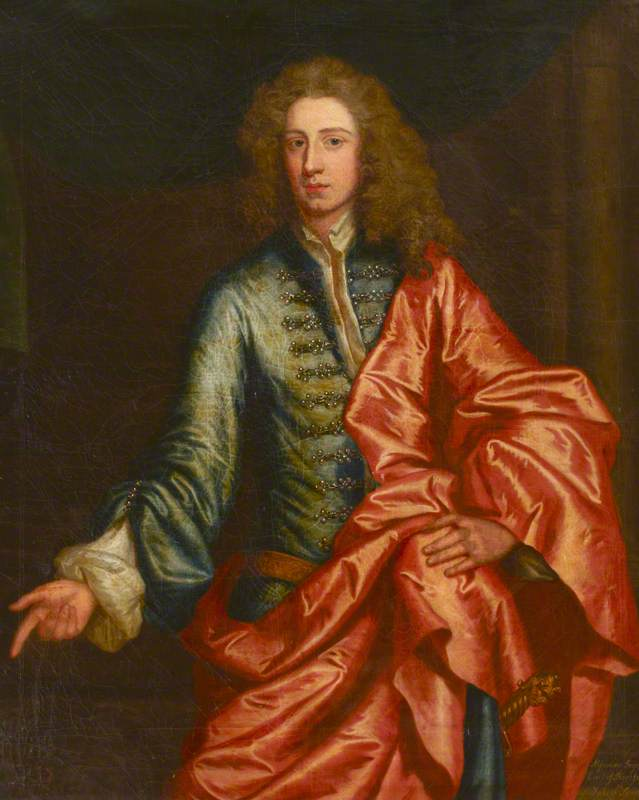
- Portrait by John Vanderbank

Governor of Guernsey
- In office 1742–1750

Governor of Minorca
- In office 1737–1742

Member of Parliament for Northumberland
- In office 1708–1722

Member of Parliament for Marlborough
- In office 1707–1708

Member of Parliament for Marlborough
- In office 1705–1707

Personal details
- Born: 11 November 1684
- Died: 7 February 1750 (aged 65)
- Party: Whig
- Spouse: Frances Thynne (m. 1715)
- Children: 2, including Elizabeth
- Parents: Charles Seymour (father); Elizabeth Percy (mother)
- Relatives: Charles Wyndham (nephew); Charles Seymour (grandfather); Joceline Percy (grandfather)
- Military career
- Service: British Army
- Rank: General
- Commands: 15th Foot; 2nd Life Guards; Royal Horse Guards

General Algernon Seymour, 7th Duke of Somerset (11 November 1684 – 7 February 1750) was a British Army officer and Whig politician who sat in the English and British House of Commons from 1705 to 1722 when he was raised to the peerage as Baron Percy and took his seat in the House of Lords.

== Background ==
Seymour was the only son of Charles Seymour, 6th Duke of Somerset, by his first wife, the heiress Lady Elizabeth Percy, deemed Baroness Percy in her own right, the only surviving child of Joceline Percy, 11th and last Earl of Northumberland. He set out on a Grand Tour at the age of 17, visiting Italy from 1701 to 1703 and Austria in 1705.

== Public life ==
Arms of Algernon Seymour, 7th Duke of Somerset: Quarterly, 1st and 4th: Or, on a pile gules between six fleurs-de-lys azure three lions of England (special grant to 1st Duke of Somerset (d. 1552)); 2nd and 3rd: Gules, two wings conjoined in lure or (Seymour) These arms concede the positions of greatest honour, the 1st & 4th quarters, to a special grant of arms to Edward Seymour, 1st Duke of Somerset by his nephew King Edward VI, incorporating the fleurs-de-lys (with tinctures reversed) of the Royal arms of France (first quartered by King Edward III) and the lions of the royal arms of Plantagenet

Seymour was still in Austria when he was returned as Member of Parliament for Marlborough on the recommendation of his father at a by-election on 27 November 1705. In 1706 he was appointed Lord-Lieutenant of Sussex for the rest of his life. He went to Flanders in the summer of 1708 to serve as a volunteer under John Churchill, 1st Duke of Marlborough and brought back news of the relief of Brussels in November. At the 1708 British general election, he was returned as a Whig MP for both Marlborough and Northumberland and chose to sit for Northumberland. He became a Colonel of the 15th Foot in 1709, and was returned in the subsequent by-election. He acted as a teller for the Whigs on several occasions and voted for the impeachment of Dr Henry Sacheverell in 1710. At the 1710 British general election he was returned again as Whig MP for Northumberland. He was appointed Governor of Tynemouth Castle by Robert Harley in 1711 and was also appointed a justice of the peace for Northumberland. In Parliament, he voted for the motion of ‘No Peace without Spain’ on 7 December 1711. He was returned again for Northumberland at the 1713 British general election and spoke strongly in support of Richard Steele, voting against his expulsion. In 1714 he was appointed Groom of the Bedchamber to George, Prince of Wales.

Seymour was returned unopposed as Whig MP for Northumberland at the 1715 British general election and proposed Spencer Compton as Speaker on 17 March 1715. He also became colonel of the 2nd Life Guards. He moved for the impeachment of William Gordon, 6th Viscount of Kenmure, a rebel lord, in January 1716 and voted against the Government on William Cadogan 1st Baron in June 1717. When there was a break in relations between George I and his son George, Prince of Wales later in 1717 he resigned his post as Groom of the Bedchamber to the Prince. He was returned again unopposed at the 1722 British general election. On 16 October 1722 took the chair at a committee of the whole House on the bill to suspend the Habeas Corpus Act. On his mother's death on 23 November 1722, he was summoned to the House of Lords as Baron Percy and vacated his seat in the House of Commons.

Percy was Custos Rotulorum of Wiltshire from 1726 to 1750. He became a brigadier-general in 1727 and in the same year was appointed Governor of Minorca, a post he held until 1742. He was promoted to major-general in 1735 and to lieutenant-general in 1739. From 1740 to 1750 he was colonel of the Royal Horse Guards and then served as Governor of Guernsey from 1742 to 1750. In 1748 he succeeded his father as Duke of Somerset.

== Land ownership and titles ==
The Duke's only son Lord Beauchamp died unmarried in 1744, aged 19 (see below). In 1748 Somerset was created Baron Warkworth, of Warkworth Castle in the County of Northumberland, and Earl of Northumberland, with remainder to his son-in-law, Sir Hugh Smithson, 4th Baronet, with the intention that the majority of the Percy estates should descend in this line. He was at the same time created Baron Cockermouth, in the County of Cumberland, and Earl of Egremont, with remainder to his nephews, Sir Charles Wyndham, 4th Baronet, of Orchard Wyndham, and Percy Wyndham-O'Brien, a revival of the Egremont title held by an earlier member of the Percy family, Thomas Percy, 1st Baron Egremont.

== Family ==
In March 1715, Somerset married Frances Thynne, daughter of Henry Thynne and granddaughter of Thomas Thynne, 1st Viscount Weymouth. This Thomas Thynne was the first cousin of "Tom of ten thousand", who had been the second husband of Algernon's own mother, Elizabeth. Somerset and Frances had two children:

- George Seymour, Viscount Beauchamp (11 September 1725 – 11 September 1744), predeceased his father, unmarried.
- Elizabeth Percy, suo jure 2nd Baroness Percy (26 November 1716 – 5 December 1776), married Sir Hugh Smithson, 4th Baronet, later 2nd Earl of Northumberland by right of his wife and 1st Duke of Northumberland by creation; had issue.

Somerset died in 1750 and was buried in the Northumberland Vault, within Westminster Abbey. He was one of the richest landowners in England, but as he died with no surviving son his estates were split after his death. The ducal title passed to a distant cousin, Edward Seymour, 8th Duke of Somerset. The earldom of Northumberland and most of the traditional Percy estates in Northumbria and Yorkshire passed to his daughter and her husband (see Alnwick Castle, Northumberland House and Syon House). Petworth House in Sussex, along with the Percy Cumbrian and East Yorkshire estates passed to the Duke's nephew Charles Wyndham, 2nd Earl of Egremont. Later dukes of Somerset lived at Maiden Bradley, a far more modest estate than those already mentioned, and for a short while at Stover House, Teigngrace, Devon and at Berry Pomeroy, Devon.

Parliament of England
Preceded by Edward Ashe; John Jeffreys	Member of Parliament for Marlborough; 1705–1707; With: John Jeffreys	Succeeded by Parliament of Great Britain
Parliament of Great Britain
Preceded by Parliament of England	Member of Parliament for Marlborough; 1707–1708; With: John Jeffreys 1707–1708; James Bruce 1708	Succeeded by James Bruce; Sir Edward Ernle
Preceded by Thomas Forster; Sir John Delaval, Bt	Member of Parliament for Northumberland; 1708–1722; With: Thomas Forster 1708–1716; Francis Delaval 1716–1722	Succeeded by Francis Delaval; Sir William Middleton
Military offices
Preceded by Emanuel Howe	Colonel of the Earl of Hertford's Regiment of Foot; 1709–1715	Succeeded by Henry Harrison
Preceded by The Duke of Northumberland	Captain and Colonel of The Queen's Troop of Horse Guards; 1715–1740	Succeeded by The Duke of Marlborough
Preceded by Richard Kane	Governor of Minorca; 1737–1742	Succeeded by The Earl of Stair
Preceded by The Duke of Argyll	Colonel of the Royal Horse Guards; 1740–1742	Succeeded by The Duke of Argyll
Preceded by The Duke of Argyll	Colonel of the Royal Horse Guards; 1742–1750	Vacant Title next held by The Duke of Richmond
Preceded by The Earl of Pomfret	Governor of Guernsey; 1742–1750	Succeeded by Sir John Ligonier
Honorary titles
Preceded by The Earl of Dorset	Lord Lieutenant of Sussex; 1706–1750	Vacant Title next held by The Earl of Ashburnham
Preceded by The Duke of Kingston-upon-Hull	Custos Rotulorum of Wiltshire; 1726–1750	Succeeded by Robert Sawyer Herbert
Peerage of England
Preceded by Charles Seymour	Duke of Somerset; 1748–1750	Succeeded by Edward Seymour
Preceded by Charles Seymour	Earl of Hertford; 1748–1750	Extinct
Peerage of Great Britain
New creation	Earl of Northumberland; 1749–1750	Succeeded by Hugh Percy
New creation	Earl of Egremont; 1749–1750	Succeeded by Charles Wyndham
New creation	Baron Percy; 1722–1750	Succeeded by Elizabeth Smithson
