= Elizabeth Seymour, Duchess of Somerset =

English heiress (1667–1722)

Her Grace The Duchess of Somerset
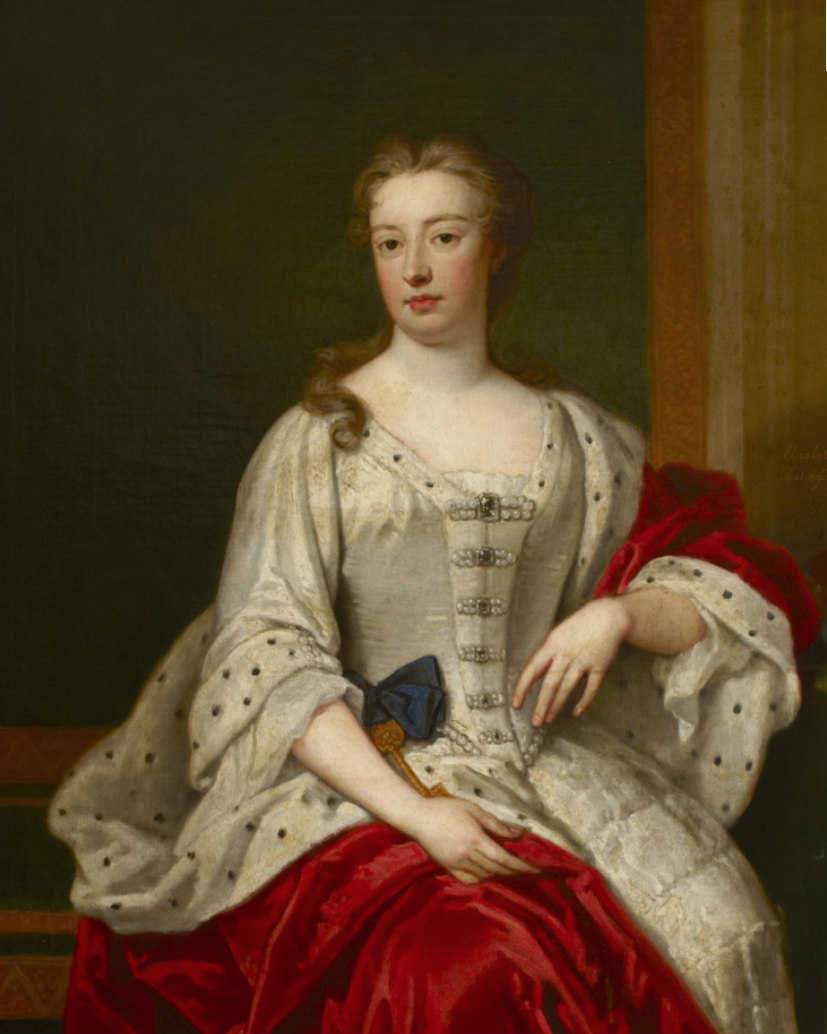
- Lady Elizabeth Percy (Duchess of Somerset), painted in 1713 by Godfrey Kneller (1646/9-1723); collection of Petworth House
- Born: Lady Elizabeth Percy; 26 January 1667; Petworth House, Sussex, Kingdom of England
- Died: 23/24 November 1722 (aged 55); Northumberland House, London, England
- Noble family: Percy (birth); Seymour (by marriage)
- Spouses: Henry Cavendish, Earl of Ogle (m. 1679; died 1680) Thomas Thynne (m. 1681; died 1682) Charles Seymour, 6th Duke of Somerset (m. 1682)
- Issue: Charles Somerset, Earl of Hereford; Algernon Seymour, 7th Duke of Somerset; Percy Seymour; Elizabeth O'Brien, Countess of Thomond; Lady Catherine Wyndham; Lady Anne Seymour; Lady Frances Seymour
- Parents: Joceline Percy, 11th Earl of Northumberland; Elizabeth Wriothesley
- Occupation: Mistress of the Robes to Anne, Queen of Great Britain

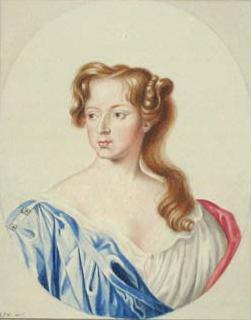
Lady Elizabeth Percy, Lady Ogle by George Perfect Harding

Elizabeth Seymour, Duchess of Somerset and suo jure Baroness Percy (26 January 1667 – 23/24 November 1722) was an English courtier.

She was styled Lady Elizabeth Percy between 1667 and 1679, Countess of Ogle between 1679 and 1681, Lady Elizabeth Thynne between 1681 and 1682, and Duchess of Somerset between 1682 and 1722. She was the only surviving child and sole heiress of Joceline Percy, 11th Earl of Northumberland (1644–1670). Lady Elizabeth was one of the closest personal friends of Queen Anne, which led Jonathan Swift to direct at her one of his sharpest satires, The Windsor Prophecy, in which she was called "Carrots".

== Marriages and children ==
She married three times, having children by the third marriage only:

=== Henry Cavendish, Earl of Ogle ===
Aged 12, she married, on 27 March 1679, the 20-year-old Henry Cavendish, Earl of Ogle (1659 – 1 November 1680), the only son and heir of Henry Cavendish, 2nd Duke of Newcastle, who in accordance with the marriage settlement adopted the surname of Percy in lieu of his patronymic. However he died the following year and was buried in the parish church at the Percy seat of Petworth. Lord Ogle is remembered mainly for this short-lived marriage. She was only twelve when they married and was widowed a year later; in view of her age, it is unlikely that the marriage was consummated.

=== Thomas Thynne ===
On 15 November 1681, at the age of fourteen, she married Thomas Thynne (died 1682) of Longleat, Wiltshire, known due to his great income as "Tom of Ten Thousand", a relative of Thomas Thynne, 1st Viscount Weymouth. He was murdered the following February in Pall Mall by three men, allegedly on the order of Swedish Count Karl Johann von Königsmark, who had started to pursue Elizabeth following the rumour that her marriage was unhappy. For the rest of her life, Elizabeth's enemies spread the story that she had incited the murder. The actual murderers were hanged, but Königsmark was acquitted of being an accessory to the crime, despite widespread public feeling against him. There were no children from this marriage.

=== Charles Seymour, 6th Duke of Somerset ===
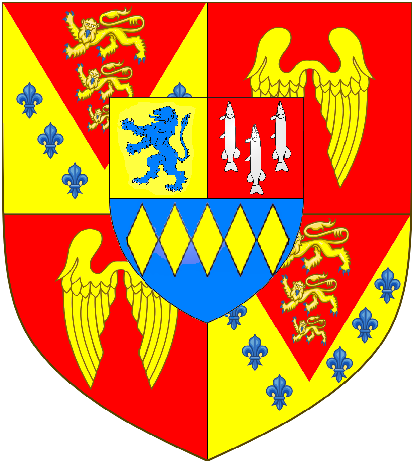
Arms of Charles Seymour, 6th Duke of Somerset: Seymour, Duke of Somerset, with inescutcheon of pretence of Percy, of three quarters: 1st: Or, a lion rampant azure (Percy modern/Brabant); 2nd: Gules, three lucies hauriant argent (de Lucy); 3rd: Azure, five fusils conjoined in fess or (Percy ancient). Marshalling as shown sculpted on overmantel of the Marble Hall, Petworth House

At the age of fifteen, five months after the death of Thomas Thynne, Elizabeth married, on 30 May 1682, the 20-year-old Charles Seymour, 6th Duke of Somerset, of Marlborough Castle in Wiltshire, and so became Duchess of Somerset. Soon after the marriage, he rebuilt in palatial style her father's principal seat Petworth House in Sussex. The marriage is said to have been unhappy: while she brought the Duke great wealth, it was said that she received neither affection nor gratitude in return. By the Duke she had the following children:

- Charles Somerset, Earl of Hereford (baptized 22 March 1683 – died before 26 Aug 1683), who died in infancy.
- Algernon Seymour, 7th Duke of Somerset (11 November 1684 – 7 February 1750), eldest surviving son and heir. His only daughter and sole heiress, Lady Elizabeth Seymour, suo jure Baroness Percy, together with her husband Sir Hugh Smithson, 4th Baronet (died 1786) (who in 1749 adopted the surname Percy and in 1766 was created Duke of Northumberland), inherited half the great Percy estates, including Alnwick Castle and Syon House.
- Percy Seymour, died unmarried.
- Lady Elizabeth Seymour (1685–2 April 1734), wife of Henry O'Brien, 8th Earl of Thomond (1688–1741), childless. His chosen heir was her younger nephew, Percy Wyndham-O'Brien, 1st Earl of Thomond (c. 1713 – 1774), of Shortgrove, Essex, who adopted the surname O'Brien and was elevated to the peerage.
- Lady Catherine Seymour (1693 – 9 April 1731), wife of Sir William Wyndham, 3rd Baronet (c. 1688 – 1740) of Orchard Wyndham in Somerset. Her eldest son was Charles Wyndham, 2nd Earl of Egremont (1710–1763), who inherited half of the great Percy estates including Petworth House and Egremont Castle.
- Lady Anne Seymour (1709 – 27 November 1722), died young.
- Lady Frances Seymour, died unmarried.

== Court career and political influence ==
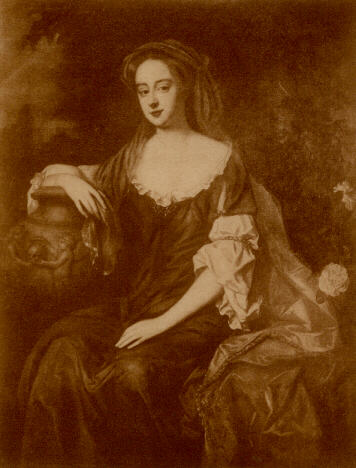
Elizabeth Seymour circa 1710

The Duke and Duchess were among Queen Anne's oldest friends; she had come to live at Syon House with them in 1692 after a heated quarrel with William III and Mary. As the country's senior peeress, Elizabeth took Anne's place as chief mourner at Mary's funeral in 1694 (since Anne's pregnancy and miscarriage prevented her attending). She served as Groom of the Stole and First Lady of the Bedchamber.

Like Marlborough before him, Somerset used his wife's position as royal confidante to advance his career. Both of them became the target of violent verbal attacks, especially from Jonathan Swift, who hoped to influence the Queen through Mrs Abigail Masham, Elizabeth's obvious rival for the position of confidante. Apparently against Masham's wishes he published a scathing diatribe, The Windsor Prophecy, against the Duchess in which her character is derided as "Carrots" (a common nickname derived from the Duchess' red hair). Swift explicitly accused the Duchess of having conspired to murder her second husband, and wildly suggested that she might poison the Queen "I have been told, they assassin when young and poison when old".

The Queen was outraged; from then on, she refused to consider Swift for preferment to a bishopric: even his appointment as Dean of St. Patrick's Cathedral, Dublin, was made against her strongly expressed wishes (she did not have the power to veto it). Ignoring the gossip, she insisted on retaining the Duchess in her household. The Duke's pride and arrogance eventually wore out the Queen's patience and he was dismissed from his court offices early in 1712. The Queen's doctor, Sir David Hamilton, advised her to keep the Duchess in her service "for her own quiet", and the Queen agreed. The Duchess served as Mistress of the Robes to Anne from 1711 to 1714, remaining in the Queen's service to the end of Anne's life, by which time Lord Dartmouth described her as "much the greatest favourite".

== Public image ==
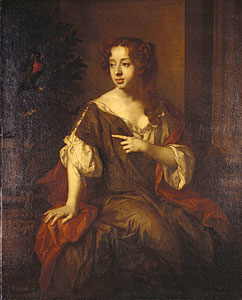
A painting of Elizabeth Seymour by Peter Lely

Elizabeth's influence on the Queen, together with her colourful past, made her many enemies. Like her third husband, she seems to have been proud, although Lord Dartmouth called her "the best bred as well as the best born person in England". She showed great skill in dealing with the Queen, her secret, it was said, being never to press the Queen to do anything for her, in contrast to Abigail Masham who constantly asked for favours. She was known as a shrewd observer of Court life and a notorious gossip; even the Queen, who was fond of her, called her "one of the most observing, prying ladies in England".

== Death ==
Elizabeth Seymour, Duchess of Somerset and Mistress of the Robes to Anne, Queen of Great Britain died of breast cancer on 23/24 November 1722, aged 55.

== Estates and residences ==
Lady Elizabeth Percy brought immense estates to her husbands and in addition her residences: Alnwick Castle, Petworth House, Syon House and Northumberland House in London.

== Sources ==
- British Library, Blenheim manuscripts
- Bucholz, R. O. (2004). "Seymour (née Percy), Elizabeth, duchess of Somerset (1667–1722), courtier and politician". Oxford Dictionary of National Biography (online ed.). Oxford University Press. doi:10.1093/ref:odnb/21925. (Subscription, Wikipedia Library access or UK public library membership required.)
- Bucholz, R. O. (1993). The Augustan court: Queen Anne and the decline of court culture.
- Chatsworth House, Devonshire manuscripts
- Cokayne, George (1887–1898). The Complete Peerage. Sutton, Alan.
- Gregg, E. G. (1980). Queen Anne. Routledge & Kegan Paul. ISBN 9780710004000.
- Holmes, G. S. (1967). British politics in the age of Anne.
- Snyder, H. L. (1975). The Marlborough–Godolphin correspondence.
- West Sussex Record Office, Petworth House archives, Somerset papers

Court offices
Preceded by The Duchess of Marlborough	Mistress of the Robes to Queen Anne; 1711–1714	Succeeded by The Duchess of Dorset
