= Joscelin of Louvain =

Brabantian nobleman

- Coat of arms: The "Lion of Brabant", Sable a lion rampant or, arms adopted late in the 12th century at the start of the age of heraldry by the Dukes of Brabant. It is said to be the origin of the "modern arms" adopted by the Percys and the base of the escutcheon of what would become the Kingdom of Belgium: Or, a lion rampant azure
- Born: 1121; Leuven, Duchy of Brabant
- Died: 1180 (aged 68-69); Petworth, Sussex
- Noble family: House of Reginar
- Spouse: Agnes de Percy
- Father: Godfrey I of Leuven

Joscelin of Louvain, also spelled Jocelin de Louvain and Jocelyn of Leuven, (1121/36–1180) was a nobleman from the Duchy of Brabant who settled in England after his half-sister Adeliza of Louvain married King Henry I. There Joscelin married an English heiress, and through his son, the House of Percy—as the Earls and later the Dukes of Northumberland—became the most powerful family in Northern England.

== Origins ==
He was a son of Godfrey I, Count of Louvain by an unnamed mistress

== Petworth ==
Joscelin was granted the manor of Petworth, in Sussex, by his half-sister Adeliza of Louvain, the widow of King Henry I of England. His descendants were seated at Petworth House for many centuries.

Though they originally intended Petworth to be their southern home, the Earls of Northumberland were confined to Sussex by Elizabeth I in the late 16th century, when she grew suspicious of Percy allegiance to her rival, Mary, Queen of Scots. Petworth then became their permanent home.

== Marriage and progeny ==
He married Agnes de Percy (d.1203), one of the two daughters and co-heiresses of William de Percy (d.1174/5), 3rd feudal baron of Topcliffe, Yorkshire. and Alice de Clare, descendant of Richard I of Normandy.

Upon his marriage, he adopted the Percy surname. By his wife he had at least seven children:

- Henry de Percy (d.1190/98), eldest son, who predeceased his mother and married Isabel de Brus, daughter of Adam II de Brus (d.1196), grandson of Robert de Brus, 1st Lord of Annandale. He was survived by a son William III de Percy (1197–1245), who inherited from his uncle Richard de Percy (d.1244) his grandmother's moiety of the barony of Topcliffe. His descendants were later created Earls of Northumberland.
- Richard de Percy (d.1244), younger son, who inherited from his mother her moiety of the barony of Topcliffe. He himself died without issue when his heir was his brother's son William III de Percy (1197–1245), who thus regained the whole of the Percy barony of Topcliffe, having inherited the other moiety from his great-aunt Maud de Percy (d.1204), sister of Agnes. He was a Magna Carta surety.
- Joscelin
- Radulph, went to France
- Eleanor married William Pantulf
- Maud (Matilda) (born c. 1164) married John D’Eiville
- Lucy Nun at Stixwould.
