= Topcliffe Castle =

Castle in North Yorkshire, England

- Topcliffe, North Yorkshire in England
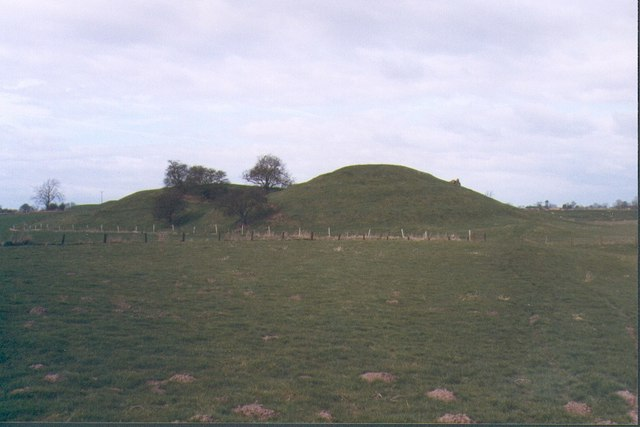
- Motte of Topcliffe Castle in 1997

Site information
- Type: Castle
- Open to the public: No (private land)

Location
- Coordinates: 54.1695°N 1.3732°W

Site history
- Fate: Demolished

Topcliffe Castle (also known as Maiden's Bower) is an abandoned castle located near the village of Topcliffe, North Yorkshire, England.

The castle was built at the junction of the River Swale and Cod Beck. A motte and bailey castle was constructed around 1071. Archbishop Geoffrey of York re-fortified the castle in 1173 during the revolt of 1173-74, with William de Stuteville appointed as governor.

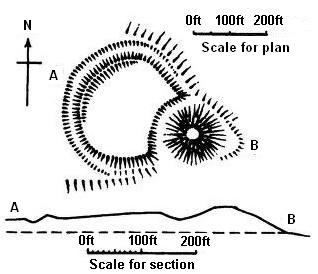
Plan of Topcliffe Castle.

The Percy family held Topcliffe. Edward III of England spent a few hours resting at the castle in August 1333. The castle appears to have been abandoned during the 14th century. In 1489, on the site of the castle, Henry Percy, 4th Earl of Northumberland was slain by an angry mob in regard to higher taxation.

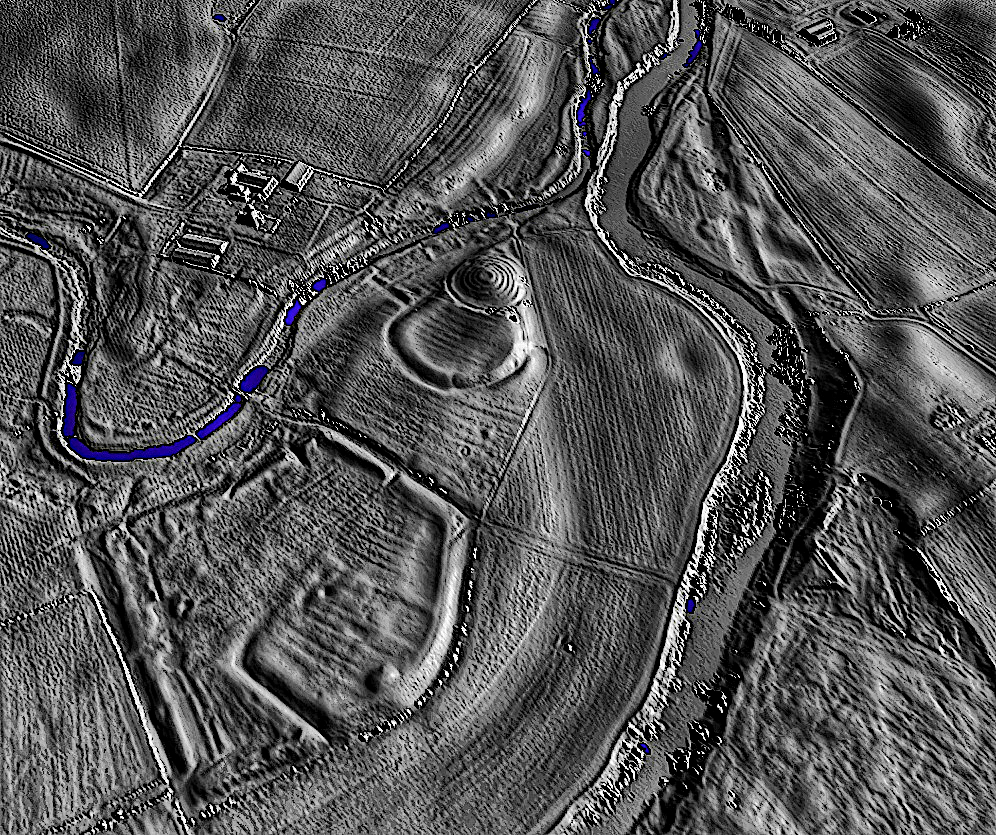
A lidar view of the castle and Cock Lodge.
