= Percy =

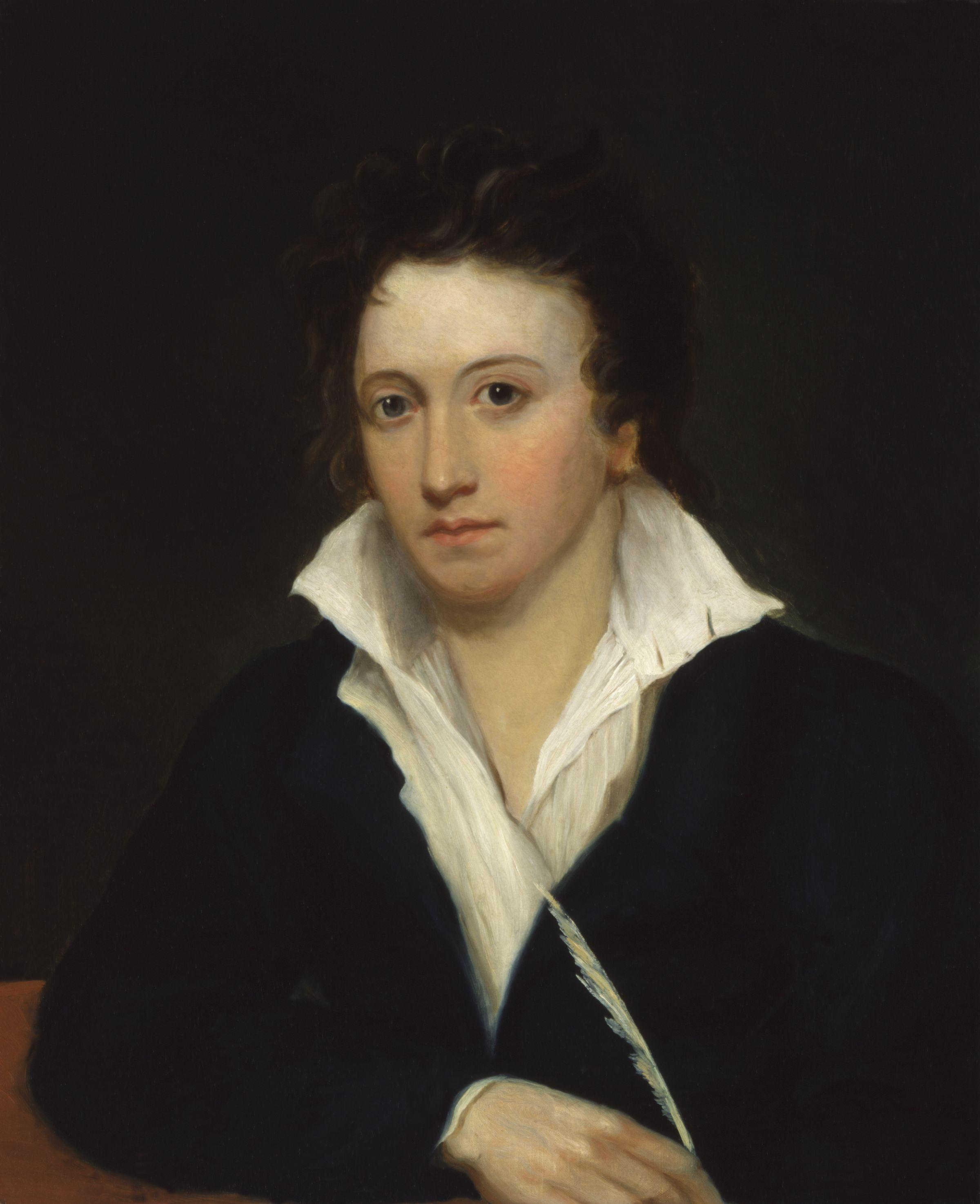
- Percy Bysshe Shelley, English writer who is considered as one of the major English Romantic poets.
- Pronunciation: /ˈpɜːrsi/
- Gender: Primarily male
- Language: English

Origin
- Language: Norman
- Origin: Percy (surname)
- Region of origin: Normandy

Other names
- Variant forms: Percey; Percie; Perci
- Related names: Percival, Perseus, Persephone, Persis

The English surname Percy is of Norman origin, coming from Normandy to England, United Kingdom. It was from the House of Percy, Norman lords of Northumberland, and derives from the village of Percy-en-Auge in Normandy. From there, it came into use as a mostly masculine and rarely feminine given name. It is also a short form of the given name Percival, Perseus, etc.

== People ==
=== Given name ===
==== Men ====
- Percy Abercrombie (1884–1964), Australian football player
- Percy Addleshaw (1866–1916), English barrister and writer
- Percy Adlon (1935–2024), German film and television director, writer and producer
- Percy Barnevik (1941–2025), Swedish business executive
- Percy Williams Bridgman (1882–1961), Nobel Prize-winning physicist
- Percy Butler (disambiguation)
- Percie Charlton (1867–1954), Australian cricketer
- Percy Cherrett (1899–1984), English footballer
- Percy Cox (1864–1937), British administrator and diplomat
- Percy Dawson (disambiguation)
- Percy Dearmer (1867–1936), English priest and liturgical writer
- Percy Dickie (1907–1987), Scottish footballer
- Percy Edwards (1908–1996), English entertainer, ornithologist and animal impersonator
- Percy Faith (1908–1976), Canadian-born bandleader, orchestrator, composer and conductor
- Percy Fawcett (1867–?), British soldier, archaeologist and explorer
- Percy Fernando (1952–2000), Sri Lankan Sinhala army major general
- Percy Foreman, American lawyer
- Percy French (1854–1920), Irish songwriter, entertainer and painter
- Percy Gardner (1846–1937), English classical archaeologist
- Percy Grainger (1882–1961), Australian-born American composer and pianist
- Percy Grant (Royal Navy officer) (1867–1952), Royal Navy admiral and Chief of Navy of the Royal Australian Navy
- Percy Stickney Grant (1860–1927), American Episcopal priest
- Percy Greene (1897–1977) American newspaper editor and journalist
- Percy Harvin (born 1988), American football player
- Percy Heath (1923–2005), American jazz bassist
- Percy Helton (1894–1971), American actor
- Percy Herbert (disambiguation)
- Percy C. Ifill (1913–1973), American architect
- Percy Jones (disambiguation)
- Percy Hague Jowett (1882–1955), British artist and arts administrator
- Percy Lavon Julian (1899–1975), American research chemist
- Percy William Justyne (1812–1883), English artist
- Percy Kachipande (born 1944), Malawian diplomat
- Percy Kilbride (1888–1964), American actor
- Percy Ludgate (1883–1922), Irish amateur scientist who designed the second analytical engine in history
- Percy Lynsdale (1928–1997), Iraqi footballer
- Percy Lowe (1870–1948), English surgeon and ornithologist
- Percy MacKaye (1875–1956), American dramatist and poet
- Percy Mahinda Rajapaksa (born 1945), Prime Minister of Sri Lanka
- Percy Tilson Magan (1867–1947), Irish-American educator
- Percy Marmont (1883–1977), English actor
- Percy Metcalfe (1895–1970), English artist and currency designer
- Percy Robert Miller, aka Master P, hip-hop artist and entrepreneur
- Percy Romeo Miller (born 1989), aka Romeo Miller, hip-hop artist, college basketball player, entertainer and son of Percy Robert
- Percy Montgomery (born 1974), South African rugby player
- Percy Erskine Nobbs (1875–1964), Scottish-born Canadian architect
- Percy Noble (Royal Navy officer) (1880–1955), British Second World War admiral, Royal Navy Commander-in-Chief, Western Approaches
- Percy Verner Noble (1902–1996), Canadian Member of Parliament
- Percy Orthwein (1888–1957), American businessman
- Percy Paris, 21st century Canadian politician
- Percy Paris (minister) (1882–1942), New Zealand Methodist minister, editor, writer and political and social reformer
- Percy Parsons (1878–1944), American actor
- Percy Pepoon (1861–1939), American politician
- Percy Quin (1872–1932), American politician
- Percy Avery Rockefeller (1878–1934), American businessman
- Percy Rodriguez (disambiguation)
- Percy Rojas (born 1949), Peruvian football player
- Percy Ross (1916–2001), American philanthropist
- Percy Schmeiser (1931–2020), Canadian politician, farmer and Canadian Supreme Court defendant
- Percy Shaw (1890–1976), English inventor and businessman
- Percy Bysshe Shelley (1792–1822), English poet
- Percy Sledge (1940–2015), American R&B and soul singer
- Percy Smith (disambiguation)
- Percey F. Smith (1867–1956), American mathematician
- Percy Spencer (1894–1970), American engineer and inventor of the microwave oven
- Percy Spender (1897–1985), Australian politician and diplomat
- Percy Stone (1856–1934), British architect
- Percy Sutton (1920–2009), American politician, civil rights activist and businessman
- Percy Tau (born 1994), South African football player
- Percy Thrower (1913–1988), British gardener, horticulturist, broadcaster and writer
- Percy Trompf (1902–1964), Australian commercial artist
- Percy Vear (1911–1983), British boxer
- Percy Wenrich (1887–1952), American composer
- Percy White (rugby league) (1888–1918), Australian rugby player
- Percy White (cricketer) (1868–1946), New Zealand cricketer
- Percy White (nuclear scientist) (1916–2013), British chemist, metallurgist and nuclear scientist
- Percy Whitlock (1903–1946), English organist and composer
- Percy Wickremasekera, Sri Lankan Sinhala Trotskyist politician, lawyer and trade unionist
- Percy Williams (disambiguation)
- Perce Wilson (1890–1936), American football player
- Percy Wilson (footballer) (1889–1941), Australian footballer
- Percy Wyndham (disambiguation)
- Percy M. Young (1912–2004), British musicologist, editor, organist, composer, conductor and teacher
- Percy Yutar (1911–2002), South African attorney-general and prosecutor of Nelson Mandela in the 1963 Rivonia treason trial

==== Women ====
- Percy Haswell (1871–1945), American silent film actress
- Percy Maxim Lee (1906–2002), American political and social reformer
- Percy Tuhaise (born 1960), Ugandan lawyer and judge

=== Surname ===
- Alf Percy (1912–?), Scottish footballer
- Algernon Percy (disambiguation)
- Allan Percy (1577–1611), English politician
- Charles H. Percy (1919–2011), American businessman and politician
- Eileen Percy (1902–1973), Irish-born American actress
- George Percy (disambiguation)
- Henry Percy (disambiguation)
- Hugh Percy, 2nd Duke of Northumberland (1742–1817), British lieutenant-general in the American Revolutionary War
- Isabelle Clark Percy West (1882–1976), American artist and educator
- James Gilbert Percy (1921–2015), American Marine officer and flying ace
- Jervis Percy (1928–2026), British pentathlete
- John Percy (disambiguation)
- LeRoy Percy (1860–1929), American planter and politician
- Pierre-Francois Percy (1754–1825), French surgeon
- Richard Percy (died 1648), English soldier
- Samuel Percy (1750-1820) Irish-born wax modeller of portraits
- Thomas Percy (disambiguation)
- Walker Percy (1916–1990), American author
- William Percy (disambiguation)

== Fictional characters ==
- Sir Percy Blakeney, the Scarlet Pimpernel in novels and various adaptations
- Percy Dovetonsils, created and played by American television comedian Ernie Kovacs
- Percy Jackson, a son of Poseidon and main character in Camp Half-Blood Chronicles
- Judge Percy Merrick, in the film High Noon
- Percy Pea, from the VHS and DVD series VeggieTales
- Lord Percy Percy, two related characters in the popular British sitcom Blackadder
- Percy Polie, in the animated children's series Rolie Polie Olie
- Percival "Percy" Fredrickstein Von Musel Klossowski de Rolo III, a human gunslinger in the D&D web series Critical Role
- Percy Sugden, in the British soap opera Coronation Street
- Percy Weasley, in the Harry Potter series
- Percy Wetmore, from Stephen King's novel The Green Mile
- Percy the Park Keeper, in the British children's television series of the same name
- Black Knight (Sir Percy), a Marvel Comics character
- Percy the Dog, in Pocahontas
- Percy the Penguin, on the animated children's series Jake and the Never Land Pirates
- Percy the Small Engine, in the Railway Series and Thomas & Friends
- Percy, in the animated American television series Clarence
- Percy, in the animated American television series Amphibia
- Percy, on the 2020 film Percy
- Percy, a hunter in the video game Identity V

== See also ==
- Percey F. Smith (1867–1956), American mathematician
- Percie Charlton (1867–1954), Australian cricketer
- Piercey, a list of people with the surname
