= Percy (disambiguation) =

Percy is a given name and a surname.

Percy may also refer to:

== Places ==
=== Australia ===
- The Percy Group, Queensland, islands in Queensland

=== France ===
- Percy, Isère, a commune
- Percy, Manche, a village and commune

=== United States ===
- Percy, Illinois, a village
- Percy, Mississippi, an unincorporated community
- Percy Township, Kittson County, Minnesota

=== Antarctica ===
- Mount Percy, Graham Land

== Entertainment ==
=== Films ===
- Percy (1925 film), an American silent comedy film
- Percy (1971 film), a British comedy
- Percy (1989 film), an Indian comedy drama by Pervez Merwanji
- Percy (2020 film), a drama film directed by Clark Johnson

=== Literature ===
- Percy (novel), a 1969 comedy novel by Raymond Hitchcock

=== Music ===
- Percy (band), a British post-punk band
- Percy (soundtrack), soundtrack of the 1971 film, by The Kinks
- Percy Folio, an 1867 book of English ballads

== Other uses ==
- House of Percy, an English aristocratic family
- Baron Percy, a title created several times in the Peerage of England
- Tropical Storm Percy, various typhoons and a storm
- Hôpital d'instruction des armées Percy, a military hospital in France
- Perseverance (rover), a Mars rover nicknamed "Percy"

== See also ==
- Perci (disambiguation)
- Persi (disambiguation)
- Peirce (disambiguation)
- Perse (disambiguation)
