= William Percy =

William Percy may refer to:

- William de Percy (died c. 1096/9), Anglo-Norman nobleman, crusader and founder of Whitby Abbey
- William de Percy, 6th Baron Percy (died 1245), English noble
- William Percy (Sussex MP) (c. 1337–1407), English politician
- William Percy (bishop) (1428–1462), British bishop
- William Percy (writer) (1574–1648), English poet and playwright
- William Percy (portrait artist) (1820–1903), of Manchester, England
- William Henry Percy (1788–1855), British naval officer
- William Alexander Percy (politician), (1834–1888) American politician and grandfather of the below
- William Alexander Percy (1885–1942), American lawyer, planter and poet
- William Armstrong Percy III (born 1933), American historian and gay activist
- Lord William Percy (1882–1963), British military officer, barrister, and ornithologist

== See also ==
- William Percy Carpmael (1864–1936), founder of The Barbarians football club
- Percy
