= Jim Coates =

American baseball player (1932–2019)

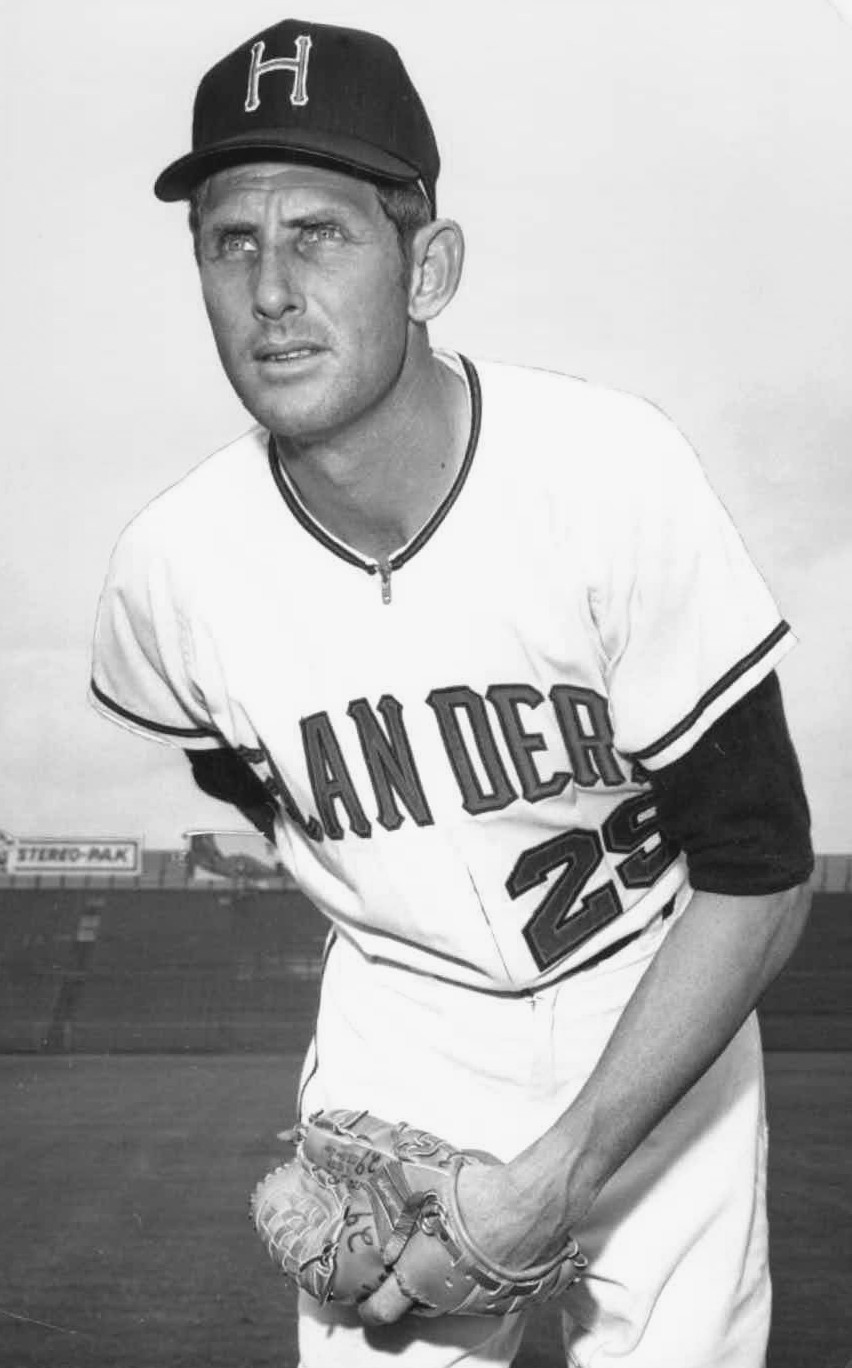
- Coates pitched for the Hawaii Islanders in 1969–70, his last two seasons in pro baseball
- Pitcher
- Born: August 4, 1932; Farnham, Virginia, U.S.
- Died: November 15, 2019 (aged 87); Lively, Virginia, U.S.
- Batted: Right Threw: Right

MLB debut
- September 21, 1956, for the New York Yankees

Last MLB appearance
- September 30, 1967, for the California Angels

MLB statistics
- Win–loss record: 43–22
- Earned run average: 4.00
- Strikeouts: 396
- Stats at Baseball Reference

Teams
- New York Yankees (1956, 1959–1962); Washington Senators (1963); Cincinnati Reds (1963); Los Angeles/California Angels (1965–1967)

Career highlights and awards
- 2× All-Star (1960, 1960²); 2× World Series champion (1961, 1962)

James Alton Coates (August 4, 1932 – November 15, 2019) was an American professional baseball pitcher. A right-hander, Coates pitched in Major League Baseball for the New York Yankees (1956, 1959–62), Washington Senators (1963), Cincinnati Reds (1963) and Los Angeles/California Angels (1965–67). He was born in Farnham, Virginia, attended Lancaster High School, and was listed as 6 feet 4 inches (1.93 m) tall and 192 pounds (87 kg).

== Career ==
=== Early career ===
Coates was signed by minor-league executive Percy Dawson of the New York Yankees as an amateur free agent in 1951. He spent seven years in the Yankees’ farm system with a call-up in 1956, during which he made his major-league debut. Coates spent all of the next two seasons in the minors but saw limited play in 1958 due to a fractured elbow.

Fully recovered in 1959, Coates pitched in 37 games, all but four in relief, winning six games against one loss, with a 2.87 earned run average in 100 1/3 innings pitched. The season, however, was disastrous for the Yankees as a whole—after winning seven World Series and nine American League pennants in ten seasons, and winning 103 games in 1954, the one year in that stretch when they didn't win the pennant (the Cleveland Indians won 111), the Yankees, beset by injuries all season, finished third, 15 games behind the American League champion Chicago White Sox. The lowlight of the Yankees’ season was falling into last place in the American League on May 20.

=== 1960 World Series ===
In 1960, Coates went 13–3 as a spot starter. After winning his last five decisions in 1959 and his first nine this season, Coates finally had his winning streak broken against the Boston Red Sox on July 9, a 6–5 loss in which Vic Wertz drove in four of the runs. Coates was also named to the All-Star team, pitching two scoreless innings in the first of two games played that year (between 1959 and 1962, Major League Baseball had two All-Star games).

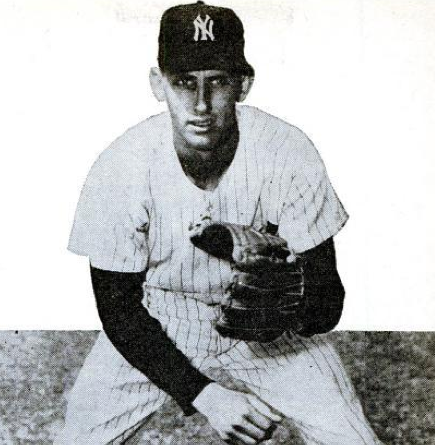
Coates in 1960

Coates was a member of the Yankee team that regained the American League pennant in 1960, but lost to the Pittsburgh Pirates in the World Series in seven games. In Game 1, Coates gave up a home run by Bill Mazeroski for the deciding runs in the Pirates’ 6–4 victory. Before Ralph Terry gave up Mazeroski's second home run of this Series (the walk-off home run that won Game 7 10–9 for the Pirates and ended the Series), Coates himself was almost the scapegoat in the Yankees’ loss. With the Yankees ahead 7–5 with no outs (and one run in) in the eighth inning and Bill Virdon on second and Dick Groat on first, Coates relieved Bobby Shantz and got Bob Skinner out on a sacrifice bunt, which advanced the runners. Rocky Nelson then flew out to Roger Maris in right field, and Virdon declined to challenge Maris’ throwing arm. Coates then got to an 0–2 count on Roberto Clemente and was a strike away from getting the Yankees out of trouble.

However, a lapse by Coates allowed the Pirates to keep their inning alive. Clemente eventually chopped a ground ball toward first base, and Coates initially ran toward the ball instead of running directly to cover first base. First baseman Moose Skowron fielded the ball as Coates changed direction and ran to the first base bag. But the momentary delay enabled Clemente to reach the base right as Coates got there himself. Skowron was forced to hold on to the ball, and Virdon scored to cut the Yankee lead to 7–6. Coates then gave up a home run to Hal Smith to give the Pirates a 9–7 lead. Terry then relieved Coates and retired Don Hoak to finally end the inning. The Yankees got Coates off the hook by scoring twice in the top of the ninth to tie the game, only to lose on Mazeroski's home run off Terry in the bottom of the 9th. The Pirates had hit four home runs in this Series; Coates had given up two of them.

=== 1961 and 1962 championships ===
In 1961, Coates went 11–5 as a spot starter. Led by the hitting of Maris, Skowron, Mickey Mantle, Yogi Berra and Elston Howard, the infield defense of Clete Boyer, Tony Kubek and Bobby Richardson, and Whitey Ford's 25–4 season, the now-Ralph Houk-led Yankees (Stengel had been fired immediately after the 1960 World Series) won the World Series over the Cincinnati Reds in five games. Coates relieved Ford in Game 4 of the Series and pitched four scoreless innings for the save in a 7–0 Yankee win; Ford had left the game with an injury, but not without first breaking Babe Ruth's World Series record of 29 2/3 consecutive scoreless innings.

In 1962, Coates went 7–6 for a Yankee team that repeated as World Series champions, defeating the San Francisco Giants in seven games. Coates was the losing pitcher in Game 4 but he threw 2 1/3 shutout innings in relief of Ford in Game 6. It would be Coates' last appearance in a New York uniform.

=== Senators, Reds and Angels ===
Traded away by the Yankees (for left-handed reliever Steve Hamilton) on April 21, 1963, Coates would pitch another 80 games for three MLB teams through 1967. His record was only 6–7 with a 4.48 ERA and two saves after leaving the Bronx, although as a starting pitcher for the Angels on August 14, 1966, he fired a four-hit, complete game shutout against the White Sox, the fourth whitewashing of his big-league career. He also put up several strong campaigns in the Pacific Coast League during his late career, including a 17-win season for the 1968 Seattle Angels. He retired at age 38 after the 1970 minor-league season, his 19th in professional baseball.

== Legacy ==
In his 247-game MLB career, Coates, whose nickname, "The Mummy", came from his funereal visage on the mound, won 43 games against 22 losses (a winning percentage of .662), with 17 saves, 13 complete games, four shutouts, a 4.00 ERA and 396 strikeouts in 683 1/3 innings pitched. He surrendered 650 hits and 286 bases on balls. As a Yankee, he went 37–15 (.712) with a 3.84 earned run average during the regular season; in six World Series games he lost his only decision, earned a save and posted a 4.15 ERA, allowing eight hits and three bases on balls, with eight strikeouts, in 13 innings pitched.

Coates was also well known for throwing at opposing batters. Jim Bouton, in his book, Ball Four, said Coates, after throwing at the opposing hitters, "would not get into the fights that followed." Coates disputes this, "Bouton had a personal issue, I don't know what he's referring to. I'd say it's hard to avoid the fight from the mound." Coates later said. In 2012, Coates published an autobiography titled Always a Yankee.

In 1994, he was inducted into the Virginia Sports Hall of Fame. Coates died on November 15, 2019, at the age of 87.
