= Tar-Vabriga =

Tar-Vabriga Torre-Abrega
- Municipality
- Tar-Vabriga Municipality; Općina Tar-Vabriga; Comune di Torre-Abrega
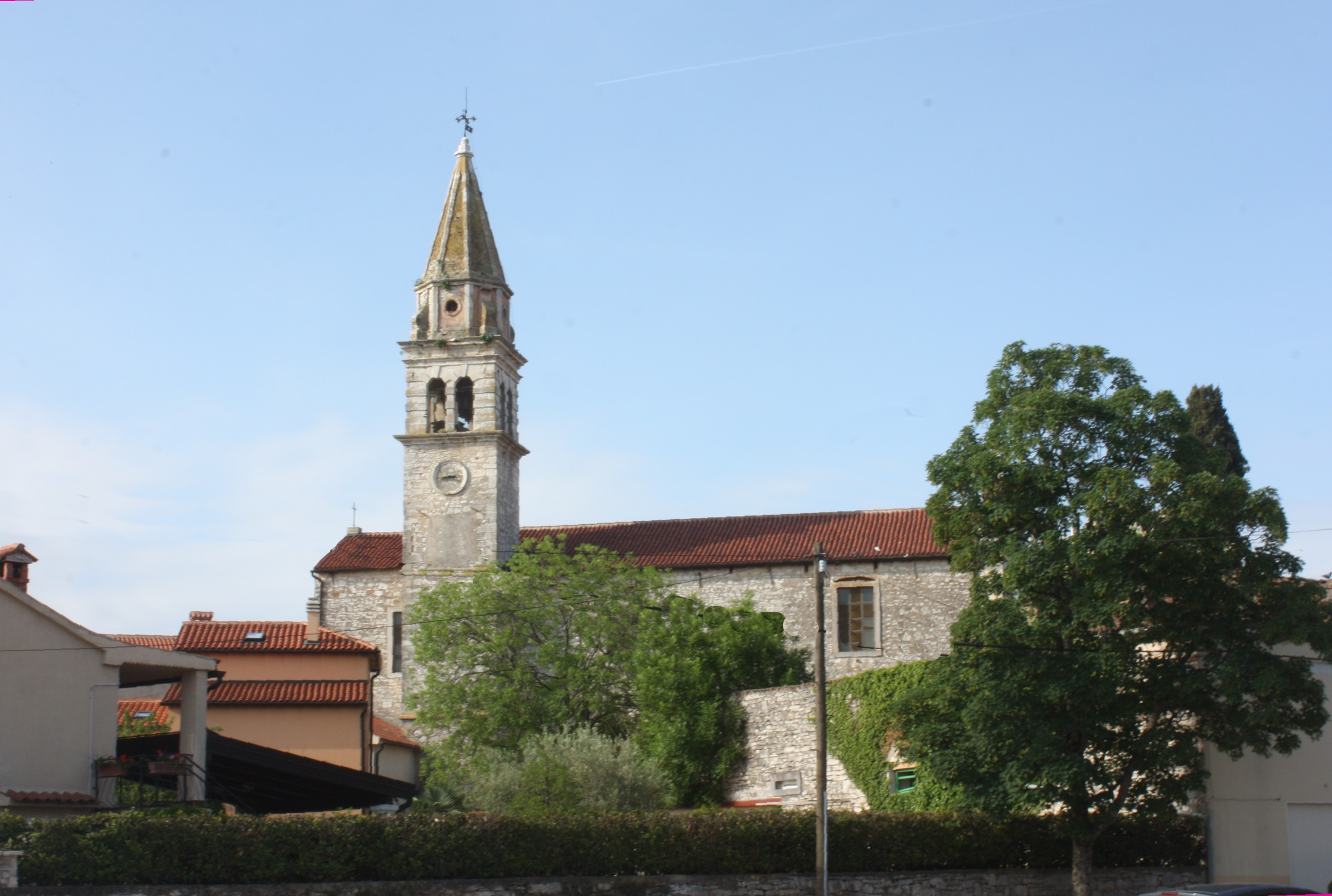
- Saint Martin's Church

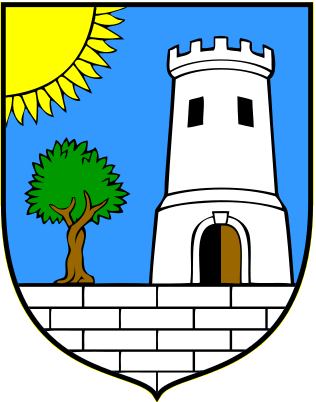
- Flag Seal

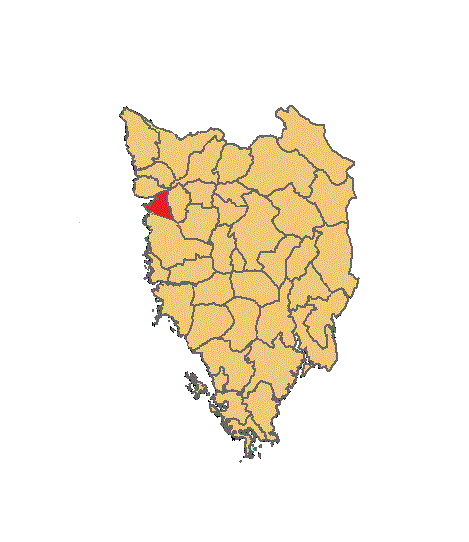
- Location of Tar-Vabriga in Istria
- Interactive map of Tar-Vabriga
- Location within Croatia
- Coordinates: 45°18′N 13°38′E
- Country: Croatia
- County: Istria County

Government
  - Mayor: Nivio Stojnić

Area
  - Total: 10.5 sq mi (27.1 km^{2})

Population (2021)
  - Total: 2,148
  - Density: 205/sq mi (79.3/km^{2})
- Time zone: UTC+1 (CET)
  - Summer (DST): UTC+2 (CEST)
- Postal code: 52440 Poreč
- Area code: 52
- Website: tar-vabriga.hr

Tar-Vabriga (Italian: Torre-Abrega) is a municipality in the Istria County, west Croatia, approximately 7 km north of Poreč. The municipality was established in 2006.

Tar-Vabriga is known for its olive oil, and according to FAO experts, the best olive oil in Europe is produced from the olives on the Larun plantation.

== Demographics ==
According to the 2021 census, its population was 2,148 with 1,145 living in Tar village and 464 in Vabriga. It was 1,506 in 2001.

The municipality consists of the following settlements:

- Frata, population 86
- Gedići, population 136
- Perci, population 124
- Rošini, population 194
- Tar, population 1,144
- Vabriga, population 464

=== Languages ===
Italian is an official language along with Croatian: although the Government of the Republic of Croatia does not guarantee official bilinguialism here, the statute of Tar-Vabriga/Torre-Abrega itself does.
