= Persephone Borrow =

Viral immunologist

Persephone Borrow (née Tough) is a viral immunologist specialising in T-cell responses in acute and early HIV-1 infections. She has been at the University of Oxford since 2005 and in 2016 was made a professor there.

== Life ==
The daughter of scientists, Borrow completed a Bachelor of Arts degree in Natural Science at the University of Cambridge in 1985; the university awarded her a doctorate four years later, which involved studying chronic viral infection in mice relating to demyelination. She then worked as a postdoctoral research assistant to Michael Oldstone at The Scripps Research Institute. She received five years of funding from the National Institutes of Health to carry out her own research relating to HIV and then, in 1995, became an assistant professor at the Scripps Research Institute, but two years later joined the Edward Jenner Institute as the leader of the Viral Immunology Group. She joined the Nuffield Department of Medicine at the University of Oxford in 2005. In 2016 the university awarded her with the title of Professor of Viral Immunology.

As of 2014, Borrow was married with two children.

== Published work ==
Borrow specialises in T-cell responses in acute and early HIV-1 infections, research which it is hoped will aid the creation of vaccines. Borrow's recent published works include:

- T. L. Foster, H. Wilson, S. S. Iyer, K. Coss, K. Doores, S. Smith, P. Kellam, A. Finzi, P. Borrow, B. H. Hahn and S. J. Neil, "Resistance of transmitted founder HIV-1 to IFITM-mediated restriction", Cell Host Microbe, vol. 20, issue 4 (2016), pp. 429–442.
- B. F. Haynes, G. M. Shaw, B. Korber, G. Kelsoe, J. Sodroski, B. H. Hahn, P. Borrow and A. J. McMichael, "HIV-host interactions: implications for vaccine design", Cell Host Microbe, vol. 19, issue 3 (2016), pp. 292–303.
- A. Bridgeman, J. Maelfair, T. Davenne, T. Partridge, Y. Peng, A. Mayer, T. Dong, V. Kaever, P. Borrow, and J. Rehwinkel, "Viruses transfer the antival second messenger cGAMP between cells", Science, vol. 349, issue 6253 (2015), pp. 1228–1232.
- L. Yue, K. J. Pfafferott, J. Baalwa, K. Conrod, C. C. Dong, C. Chui, R. Rong, D. T. Claiborne, J. L. Price and J. Tang, et al., "Transmitted virus fitness and host T cell responses collectively define divergent infection outcomes in two HIV-1 recipients", PLoS Pathogens, vol. 11, issue 1 (2015).
- A. E. Armitage, A. R. Stacey, E. Giannoulatou, E. Marshall, P. Sturges, K. Chatha, N. M. Smith, X. Huang, X. Xu, and S. R. Pasricha, et al., "Distinct patterns of hepcidin and iron regulation during HIV-1, HBV, and HCV infections", Proceedings of the National Academy of Sciences of the United States of America, vol. 111, issue 33 (2014), pp. 12187–12192.
- A. E. Fenton-May, O. Dibben, T. Emmerich, H. Ding, K. Pfafferott, M. N. Aasa-Chapman, P. Pelligrino, I. Williams, M. S. Cohen, and F. Gao, et al., "Relative resistance of HIV-1 founder viruses to control by interferon-alpha", Retrovirology, vol. 10, issue 1 (2013).
- P. Ribeiro dos Santos, E. L. Turnbull, M. Monteiro, A. Legrand, K. Conrod, J. Baalwa, P. Pellegrino, G. M. Shaw, I. Williams, P. Borrow, and B. Rocha, "Chronic HIV infections affects the expression of the 2 transcription factors required for CD8 T-cell differentiation into cytolytic effectors", Blood, vol. 119, issue 21 (2012), pp. 4928–4938.
- P. Borrows, "Innate immunity in acute HIV-1 infection", Current Opinion in HIV and AIDS, vol. 6, issue 5 (2011), pp. 353–363.
