= Tar (Tar-Vabriga) =

Tar Torre
- Village
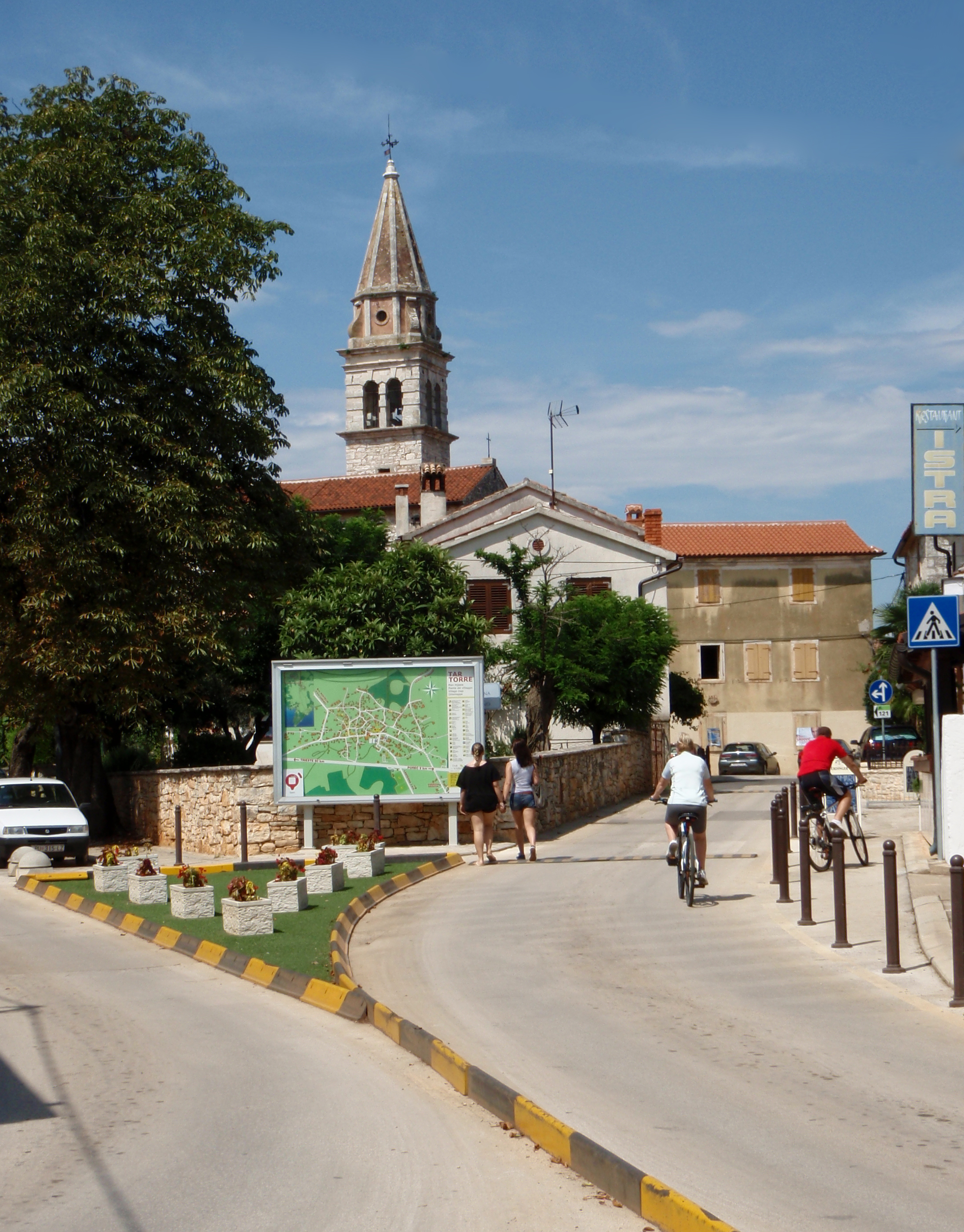

- Location within Croatia
- Coordinates: 45°17′56″N 13°37′30″E
- Country: Croatia
- County: Istria County
- Municipality: Tar-Vabriga

Area
  - Total: 4.7 sq mi (12.2 km^{2})

Population (2021)
  - Total: 1,144
  - Density: 243/sq mi (93.8/km^{2})
- Time zone: UTC+1 (CET)
  - Summer (DST): UTC+2 (CEST)
- Postal code: 52465 Tar
- Area code: 052

Tar (Italian: Torre) is a village in Tar-Vabriga municipality in Istria County, Croatia.

== Demographics ==
According to the 2021 census, its population was 1,144. It was 886 in 2001.
