= Rošini =

Rošini Rossini, Villa Rossa
- Village
- Location within Croatia
- Coordinates: 45°16′15″N 13°38′25″E
- Country: Croatia
- County: Istria County
- Municipality: Tar-Vabriga

Area
  - Total: 0.97 sq mi (2.5 km^{2})

Population (2021)
  - Total: 194
  - Density: 200/sq mi (78/km^{2})
- Time zone: UTC+1 (CET)
  - Summer (DST): UTC+2 (CEST)
- Postal code: 52446 Nova Vas
- Area code: 052

Rošini (Italian: Rossini, Villa Rossa) is a village in Tar-Vabriga municipality in Istria County, Croatia.

== Demographics ==
According to the 2021 census, its population was 194. It was 117 in 2001.
