= Perci =

Perci may refer to:

- Perci (Buzet), Croatia, a village in the town of Buzet
- Perci (Tar-Vabriga), Croatia, a village in Tar-Vabriga municipality
- Perci Garner (born 1988), American baseball pitcher
- House of Percy (spelled Perci in old French), an English noble family
- Perci militia, one side in the Batwa–Luba clashes in the Democratic Republic of the Congo

== See also ==
- Percy (disambiguation)
- Persi (disambiguation)
- Robin van Persie (born 1983), Dutch former footballer
