= Vabriga =

Vabriga Abrega
- Village
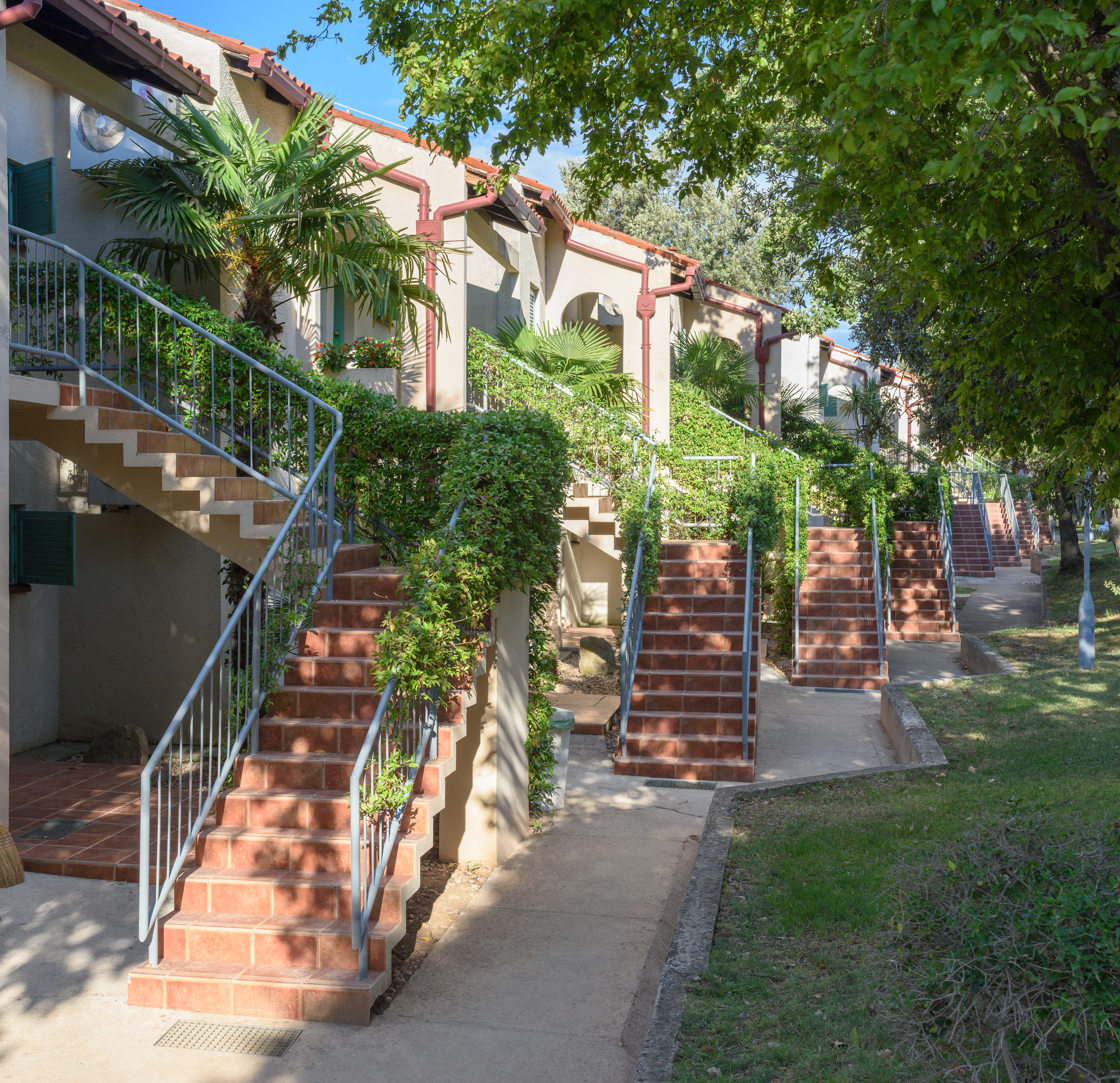

- Location within Croatia
- Coordinates: 45°17′31″N 13°36′50″E
- Country: Croatia
- County: Istria County
- Municipality: Tar-Vabriga

Area
  - Total: 2.4 sq mi (6.1 km^{2})

Population (2021)
  - Total: 464
  - Density: 200/sq mi (76/km^{2})
- Time zone: UTC+1 (CET)
  - Summer (DST): UTC+2 (CEST)
- Postal code: 52465 Tar
- Area code: 052

Vabriga (Italian: Abrega) is a village in Tar-Vabriga municipality in Istria County, Croatia.

== Demographics ==
According to the 2021 census, its population was 464. It was 392 in 2001.
