= Thomas Percy =

Thomas Percy may refer to:

- Thomas Percy, 1st Earl of Worcester (1343–1403), English medieval nobleman
- Thomas Percy (Pilgrimage of Grace) (1504–1537), executed as a leader of the Pilgrimage of Grace
- Thomas Percy (fl. 1563), MP for Plympton Erle
- Thomas Percy (died 1572), MP for Westmorland
- Thomas Percy, 7th Earl of Northumberland (1528–1572), led the Rising of the North and was executed for treason, beatified by the Catholic Church
- Thomas Percy, 1st Baron Egremont (1422–1460), son of Henry Percy, 2nd Earl of Northumberland and Lady Eleanor Neville
- Thomas Percy (bishop of Norwich) (died 1369), Bishop of Norwich
- Thomas Percy (Gunpowder Plot) (c.1560–1605), one of the conspirators in the Gunpowder Plot
- Thomas Percy (bishop of Dromore) (1729–1811), Bishop of Dromore and collector of Percy's Reliques
- Thomas George Percy (1704–1794), American cotton planter and settler of Alabama

== See also ==
- Percy
