= Persi =

Persi may refer to:

== People ==
- Persi Diaconis (born 1945), American mathematician and former professional magician
- Persi Iveland, a member of the Norwegian rock band DumDum Boys
- Raymond S. Persi (born 1975), American animator, director, screenwriter, producer, storyboard artist and voice actor
- Silvia Persi (born 1965), Italian former swimmer

== Other uses ==
- Buravet, Armenia, an abandoned settlement formerly named Persi
- Periodical Source Index
- Public Employee Retirement System of Idaho

== See also ==
- Perci (disambiguation)
- Percy (disambiguation)
