= Percy Wyndham =

Percy Wyndham may refer to:

- Percy Charles Wyndham (1757–1833), English Member of Parliament for Chichester 1782–1784, and for Midhurst 1790–1796
- Percy Wyndham (soldier) (1833–1879), British soldier and adventurer in the Battle of Thoroughfare Gap
- Percy Wyndham (1835–1911), English Conservative Party politician
- Percy Wyndham, 1st Earl of Thomond

== See also ==
- Percy
