= Percival (given name) =

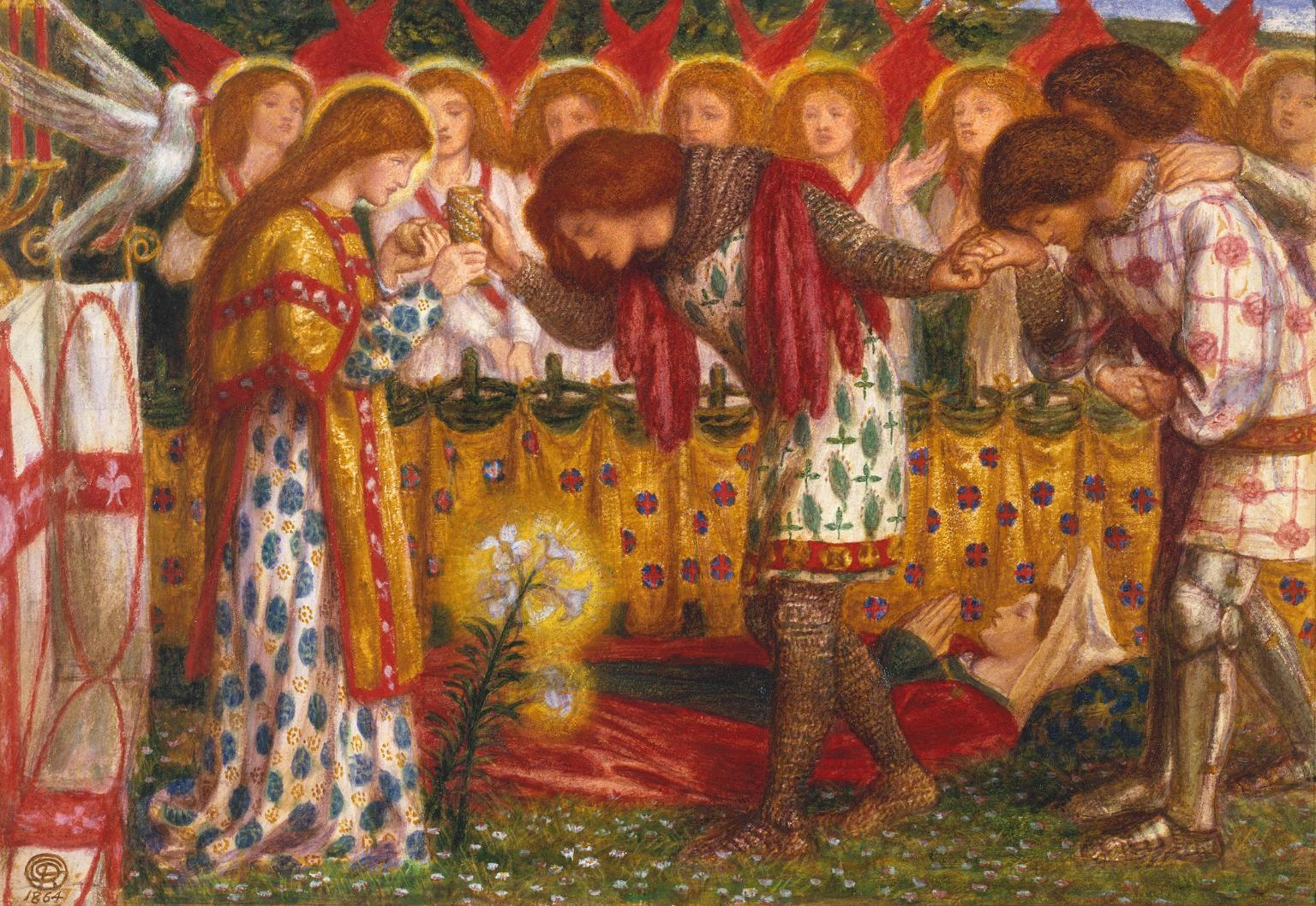
- How Sir Galahad, Sir Bors, and Sir Percival Were Fed with the Sanct Grael by Dante Gabriel Rossetti
- Gender: Male
- Language: English

Origin
- Meaning: Pierce the valley

Other names
- Related names: Parsifal, Percy, Peredur

Percival, also spelled Perceval, is a masculine given name derived from the Celtic name Peredur and likely influenced by the Old French percer, meaning pierce and val, meaning valley. The name was likely also influenced by the name Percy. Sir Percival was one of the Knights of the Round Table in Arthurian romance.

== Percival ==
- Percival Alger (born 1964), Filipino fencer
- Percival Allen (1917-2008), British geologist
- Percival Appleby (1894-1968), Canadian World War I flying ace
- Percival Arnott (1889–1950), Australian cricketer
- Percival Bailey (1892–1973), American neuropathologist, neurosurgeon, and psychiatrist
- Percival Baker (1867–1921), Canadian farmer, church minister, and politician
- Percival G. Baldwin 1880–1936), Canadian-born American businessman and politician
- Percival Barnett (1889–1966), English cricketer
- Percival "Percy" Barton (1893–1961), English footballer
- Percival Norman "Percy" Barton (1888–1912), Australian footballer
- Percival P. Baxter (1876–1969), American politician and philanthropist
- Percival Bazeley (1909–1991), Australian scientist
- Percival "Percy" Beake (1917–2016), British RAF World War II fighter pilot
- Percival Beale (1906–1981), British Chief Cashier of the Bank of England
- Percival "Percy" Benbough (1884–1942), American politician
- Percival "Percy" Best (1873–1943), Australian politician
- Percival Bonney (1842–1906), American judge
- Percival Brinton (1873–1958), English cricketer
- Percival Bromfield (1886–1947), English international table tennis player
- Percival "Percy" Brookfield (1875–1921), Australian politician and militant trade unionist
- Percival Brown (1901–1962), unionist politician from Northern Ireland
- Percival Brundage (1892–1979), American accountant and government official
- Percival Chubb (1860–1959), British socialist who proposed the official Flag of St. Louis
- Percival W. Clement (1846–1927), American politician
- Percival Coles (1865–1920), English sportsman and sporting administrator
- Percival Corbett (1900–1944), English cricketer
- Percival David (1892–1964), British financier, scholar, and collector of Chinese ceramics
- Percival Davson (1877–1959), British fencer and tennis player
- Percival "Percy" Deane (1890–1946), Australian public servant
- Percival Drayton (1812–1865), United States Navy officer
- Percival Everett (born 1956), American writer and academic
- Percival Ewens (1882–1961), British cricketer
- Percival Farquhar (1865–1953), American investor and financier
- Percival "Percy" Fawcett (1867-disappeared 1925), British geographer, artillery officer, cartographer, archaeologist, and explorer of South America
- Percival Frost (1817–1898), English mathematician
- Percival Fynn (1872–1940), Rhodesian diplomat and politician
- Percival Gale (1865–1940), English cricketer
- Percival Gibson (1893–1970), Anglican Bishop of Jamaica from 1955 to 1967
- Percival Goodman (1904–1989), American urban theorist and architect
- Percival Gordon (1884–1975), Canadian lawyer and Justice of the Saskatchewan Court of Appeal
- Percival Gourgaud (1881–1958), Australian senior public servant
- Percival "Percy" Gratwick (1902–1942), Australian recipient of the Victoria Cross
- Percival Gray (1889–1944), Australian naval officer
- William Percival "Percy" Grieve (1915–1998), British politician
- Percival Griffiths (1899–1992), British businessman who worked for the Indian Civil Service
- John Percival Gülich (1864–1898), British illustrator, engraver, and artist
- Percival Gunasekera, Sri Lankan Sinhala lawyer and diplomat
- Percival Hall (1872–1953), American president of Gallaudet University
- Percival Hart (1569–1642), English politician
- Percival Hart (1666–1738), English politician
- Percival Hartley (1881–1957), English immunologist
- Percival Horton-Smith Hartley (1867–1952), English physician and authority on tuberculosis
- William Percival "Percy" Harvin III (born 1988), American former professional football player
- Percival Healing (1878–1915), English cricketer
- Percival "Percy" Heather (1882–1956), Australian cricketer
- Percival "Percy" Heggaton (1869–1948), Australian politician
- Percival Hubbard (1905–1981), South African cricketer
- Edward Percival Whitley "Percy" Hughes (1868–?), Welsh footballer
- Percival Hussey (1869–1944), Australian sportsman
- Percival Inchbold (1884–1953), Australian politician
- Percival James (1883–1958), New Zealand clergyman
- John Percival Jones (1829–1912), American politician
- Percival Kemp (1888–1974), English cricketer
- Percival King (1835–1910), English cricketer
- Percival "Percy" Knowles (born 1930), Bahamian former sailor and Olympian
- Percival Lancaster (1880–1937), British civil engineer and writer of adventure fiction for boys
- Percival Leigh (1813–1889), English satirist and comic writer
- Percival Levett (1560–1625), English merchant and innkeeper
- Percival "Percy" Lindo (1877–1946), Jamaican banker, planter, industrialist, and legislator
- Percival "Percy" Lindsay (1870–1952), Australian landscape painter, illustrator, and cartoonist
- Percival Lloyd (1872–1915), American architect
- Percival Lowell (1855–1916), American astronomer
- Percival Mabasa, known professionally as Percy Lapid (1959–2022), Filipino journalist, radio broadcaster, and murder victim
- Percival Mackey (1894–1950), British pianist, composer, and bandleader
- Frederick Percival Mackie (1875–1944), English physician
- Percival Marling (1861–1936), English British Army officer and Victoria Cross recipient
- Percival Clarence "Clarrie" Millar (1925–2017), Australian politician
- Percival "Percy" Mills (1896–1971), British weightlifter
- Percival "Percy" Molson (1880–1917), Canadian star athlete and soldier
- Percival "Percy" Myers (1887–1967), British political activist
- Arthur Percival "A.P." Newton (1873–1942), British historian and academic
- Percival Noronha (1923–2019), Indian historian, heritage conservationist, and bureaucrat
- Percival "Percy" O'Driscoll (born 1934), Canadian Anglican bishop
- Percival "Percy" Oliver (1919–2011), Australian backstroke swimmer and Olympian
- Percival Partridge (1879–1964), English cricketer and solicitor
- Percival "Perce" Pearce (1899–1955), American producer, director, and writer
- Edward Percival "Percy" Peter (1902–1986), English competitive swimmer and water polo player and Olympian
- Percival Pickering (1810–1876), English cricketer and lawyer
- Pércival Piggott (born 1966), Panamanian former professional footballer
- Percival Pollard (1869–1911), American literary critic, novelist, and short story writer
- Percival "Percy" Pollard (1883–1948), Australian politician
- Percival C. Pope (1841–1922), American officer and United States Marine Corps Brevet Medal recipient
- John Percival Postgate (1853–1926), English classicist and academic
- Percivall Pott (1714–1788), English surgeon
- Henry Percivall Pott (1908–1964), British farmer, company director, and politician
- Percival Potter (1906–1975), Australian politician
- Percival Leroy "P.L." Prattis (1895–1980), American journalist
- Percival Puggina (born 1944), Brazilian politician, architect writer, and journalist
- Percival "Percy" Quirke (1898–1972), Australian politician
- Percival Savage (1894–1976), Australian soldier, farmer, and agriculture administrator
- Percival Serle (1871–1951), Australian biographer and bibliographer
- Percival Albert "Peter" Sheppard (1907–1977), British meteorologist
- Percival Siebold (1917–1983), British scouting administrator
- Percival Smith (1898–1965), British Archdeacon of Lynn
- Percival "Percy" Sonn (1949–2007), South African lawyer and cricket administrator
- Percival Spear (1901–1982), British historian of South Asia
- Percival Green Spencer (1864–1913), British pioneering balloonist and parachutist
- Percival Spencer Umfreville Pickering (1858-1920), British chemist and horticulturist
- Percival Hopkins Spencer (1897–1995), American inventor, aviation pioneer, test pilot, and businessman
- Percival Spencer (born 1975), former Jamaican sprinter
- Percival Stephenson (1888–1962), Australian Anglican bishop
- Percival Stockdale (1736–1811), English poet, writer, and reformer
- Percival "Percy" Stow (1876–1919), British director of short films
- Percival Symonds (1893-1960), American educational psychologist
- Percival Thirlwall, English standard bearer for King Richard III during the Battle of Bosworth Field
- Percival Tomlinson (born 1959), Jamaican cricketer
- Eric Percival "Percy" Trewern (1895–1959), Australian architect
- Percival "Percy" Trompf (1902–1964), Australian commercial artist
- Percival Turnbull (1862–1937), Australian born New Zealand cricketer
- Percival Turnbull (1953–2016), British archaeologist
- Percival "Van" Vanthoff (1894–1967), Australian senior public servant
- Percival Wallace (1891–1959), Australian cricketer
- Percival Waterfield (1888–1965), English civil servant
- Percival Watson (1881–1959), English Congregationalist who served in Australia
- Percival "Perc" Westmore (1904–1970), American makeup artist
- Percival Whitton (1892–1974), English professional footballer
- Percival Wilde (1887–1953), American author and playwright
- Hugh Percy Wilkins, born Hugh Percival Wilkins (1896–1960), Welsh-born engineer and amateur astronomer
- Percival Wilkinson (1848-c. 1891), English rugby player
- Percival Willoughby (died 1634), English land owner, businessman, and entrepreneur
- Percival Winterbotham (1883–1925), English cricketer
- Percival Christopher "P.C." Wren (1875–1941), English writer of adventure fiction

== Perceval ==
- Robert Perceval Armitage (1906-1990), British colonial administrator
- Perceval Gaillard (born 1983), French politician
- Alfred Perceval Graves (1846–1931), Anglo-Irish poet, songwriter, and folklorist
- Walter Perceval Yetts (1878–1957), British surgeon and sinologist
