= Persephone (given name) =

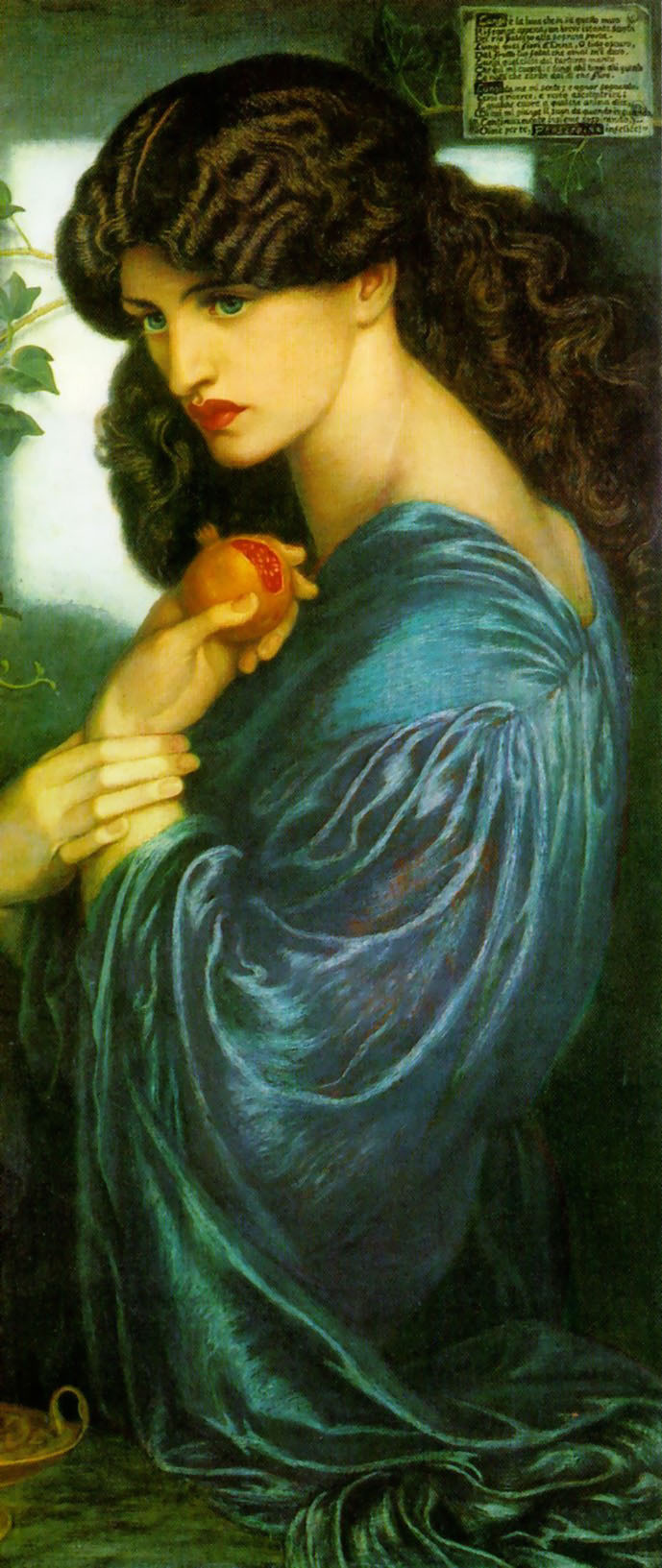
- Persephone by Dante Gabriel Rossetti.
- Pronunciation: /pərˈsɛfəni/ per-SEF-ə-nee
- Gender: feminine

Origin
- Origin: Greek

Persephone is an Ancient Greek feminine name used in reference to Persephone, the Greek goddess of spring and the Greek underworld.

== Popularity ==
Usage of the name has increased in recent years. Parents might have been influenced by the popularity of names associated with the natural world or by other long, similar sounding Greek names such as Penelope. Names from Greek mythology and names with positive associations also gained popularity for babies born during the COVID-19 pandemic. It has been among the one thousand most popular names for newborn girls in the United States since 2019.

== Notable people ==
- Persephone (wrestler), Mexican-American professional wrestler
- Persephone Borrow, English immunologist
- Persephone Swales-Dawson (born 1997), British television actress

=== Fictional characters ===
- Persephone (The Matrix), a character in the Matrix film trilogy
- Persephone or Rachel Blake, a character in The Lost Experience
- Persephone, a character in Jeff Noon's novel Pollen
- Persephone, a character in Stripperella
- Persephone, the Goddess of Life in the computer game Sacrifice
- Persephone, a character in Herc's Adventures
- Persephone "Sephy" Hadley, main character in the Noughts & Crosses series of novels by Malorie Blackman
- Persephone, an Amazon in the 2009 Wonder Woman film
- Persephone, the daughter of Admiral Lockwood, and object of Commander Kydd's affections, in the book The Admiral's Daughter
- Persephone, a Fairy character who sells upgrades in the Activision computer game Skylanders: Spyro's Adventure
- Persephone "Persie" Towyn, sister of Lady Agnes Holland in the BBC TV Series Upstairs Downstairs
- Persephone, a nickname of Eo of Lykos from Red Rising by Pierce Brown
- Persephone, a character in the 2023 The Simpsons episode "Thirst Trap: A Corporate Love Story"
- Persephone 'Percy' Fraser, a main character in the Carley Fortune novel + Prime TV Series Every Year After
