= Frata (Tar-Vabriga) =

Frata Fratta
- Village
- Location within Croatia
- Coordinates: 45°17′42″N 13°37′30″E
- Country: Croatia
- County: Istria County
- Municipality: Tar-Vabriga

Area
  - Total: 0.97 sq mi (2.5 km^{2})

Population (2021)
  - Total: 86
  - Density: 89/sq mi (34/km^{2})
- Time zone: UTC+1 (CET)
  - Summer (DST): UTC+2 (CEST)
- Postal code: 52465 Tar
- Area code: 052

Frata (Italian: Fratta) is a village in Tar-Vabriga municipality in Istria County, Croatia.

== Demographics ==
According to the 2021 census, its population was 86. It was 58 in 2001.
