= Methodist Church of New Zealand =

Methodist denomination headquartered in Christchurch

- Classification: Protestant
- Orientation: Methodist
- Scripture: Protestant Bible
- Theology: Wesleyan
- Governance: Connexionalism
- Associations: World Methodist Council
- Headquarters: Christchurch
- Origin: 1910
- Official website: www.methodist.org.nz

The Methodist Church of New Zealand (Māori: Te Hāhi Weteriana o Aotearoa) is a Methodist denomination headquartered in Christchurch, New Zealand. It is a member of the World Methodist Council.

== History ==
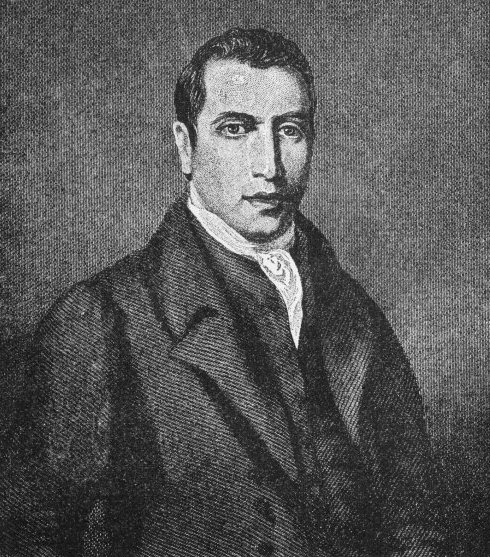
Samuel Leigh was one of the first Wesleyan missionaries in early colonial New Zealand.

The Methodist movement was started by John Wesley, an 18th-century Church of England minister. Methodist missionaries were among the earliest Europeans to come to New Zealand. Missionaries Samuel Leigh and William White established the first Wesleyan mission, Wesleydale at Kaeo on the Whangaroa Harbour, on 6 June 1823. Leigh worked alongside Anglican missionary Samuel Marsden.

The Methodist missions in New Zealand and Australia became administratively independent from Britain in 1874. The Annual Conference has always been the governing body of the Methodist Church of New Zealand. The New Zealand Church was originally a part of the Methodist Church of Australasia, with the New Zealand annual conference reporting to a triennial Australasian conference. In 1910 the Methodist Church of New Zealand completely separated from Australia.

In the late 19th and early 20th centuries the Methodist Church, with its emphasis on personal salvation and social responsibility, played an important part in the temperance movement. Methodist youth were encouraged to join the Band of Hope. Methodist minister Leonard Isitt became a full-time temperance campaigner and was elected as a member of parliament. Writer and social reformer Percy Paris became president of the Conference in 1938.

Since the early 1900s the proportion of New Zealanders who are Methodist has declined from 10% to a reported 2.6% in the 2013 census. At the 1983 conference the church made a conscious decision to work towards inclusion of all ethnicities and cultures.

The World Methodist Council website reports 9,473 Methodist Church members who worship as part of a Methodist Church parish; additionally, a "significant number" of Methodist members worship in churches co-operating with Anglicans and Presbyterians. This membership figure is undated.

== Beliefs ==
The Church is supportive of women ministers.

=== Marriage ===
A 1999 resolution allows local churches to decide about blessings of same-sex unions.

A 2013 resolution allows local churches to decide about blessings of same-sex marriage.

== Ecumenical relations ==
The Methodist Church of New Zealand is a member of the World Council of Churches and the Christian Conference of Asia. Since 2016 the church has participated in an ecumenical platform, National Dialogue for Christian Unity (NDCU), along with Anglicans and Roman Catholics.
