= Gedići =

Gedići Ghedda
- Village
- Location within Croatia
- Coordinates: 45°16′26″N 13°39′07″E
- Country: Croatia
- County: Istria County
- Municipality: Tar-Vabriga

Area
  - Total: 0.77 sq mi (2.0 km^{2})

Population (2021)
  - Total: 136
  - Density: 180/sq mi (68/km^{2})
- Time zone: UTC+1 (CET)
  - Summer (DST): UTC+2 (CEST)
- Postal code: 52446 Nova Vas
- Area code: 052

Gedići (Italian: Ghedda) is a village in Tar-Vabriga municipality in Istria County, Croatia.

== Demographics ==
According to the 2021 census, its population was 136. It was 68 in 2001.
