= George Percy =

George Percy may refer to:

- George Percy (governor) (1580–1632), English explorer, author, and early colonial governor of Virginia.
- George Percy, Earl Percy (born 1984), British businessman and heir apparent to the Dukedom of Northumberland
- George Percy, 5th Duke of Northumberland (1778–1867), British Tory politician known as The Earl of Beverley
- George Percy, 9th Duke of Northumberland (1912–1940)
- George A. Percy (1895–1970), American ice hockey player and military officer
- George W. Percy (1847–1900), American architect in San Francisco
