= Henry Percy =

Henry Percy may refer to:

== Baron Percy ==
- Henry Percy, 1st Baron Percy (1273–1314), took an important part in the Scottish wars of Edward I; knighted, 1296: present at Bannockburn, 1314
- Henry Percy, 2nd Baron Percy of Alnwick (1299–1352), elder son of Sir Henry Percy, 1st Baron Percy
- Henry Percy, 3rd Baron Percy of Alnwick (c. 1321–1368), eldest son of Henry Percy, 2nd baron Percy. Father of Henry Percy, 1st Earl of Northumberland

== Earls and Dukes of Northumberland ==
- Henry Percy, 1st Earl of Northumberland (1341–1408), son of Henry, 3rd Baron Percy
- Henry Percy, 2nd Earl of Northumberland (1392–1455), son of Henry 'Hotspur' Percy
- Henry Percy, 3rd Earl of Northumberland (1421–1461), son of the 2nd Earl of Northumberland
- Henry Percy, 4th Earl of Northumberland (c. 1449–1489), son of the 3rd Earl of Northumberland
- Henry Percy, 5th Earl of Northumberland (1477–1527), son of the 4th Earl of Northumberland
- Henry Percy, 6th Earl of Northumberland (1502–1537), son of the 5th Earl of Northumberland
- Henry Percy, 8th Earl of Northumberland (1532–1585), brother of the 7th Earl of Northumberland
- Henry Percy, 9th Earl of Northumberland (1564–1632), son of the 8th Earl of Northumberland
- Henry Percy, 7th Duke of Northumberland (1846–1918), son of the 6th Duke of Northumberland
- Henry Percy, 9th Duke of Northumberland (1912–1940), son of the 8th Duke of Northumberland
- Henry Percy, 11th Duke of Northumberland (1953–1995), son of the 10th Duke of Northumberland

== Others ==
- Henry Percy (Hotspur) (1364–1403), eldest son of the 1st Earl of Northumberland
- Henry Percy, Baron Percy of Alnwick (died 1659), younger brother of 10th Earl of Northumberland and a member of the household of Charles II during his exile
- Henry Percy (British Army officer) (1785–1825), aide-de-camp to Sir John Moore and to Wellington, and brought home the Waterloo dispatches
- Lord Henry Percy (1817–1877), English recipient of the Victoria Cross
- Henry Percy, Earl Percy (1871–1909), son of the 7th Duke of Northumberland, Conservative Government Under-Secretary of State
