= William Percy (Sussex MP) =

English politician (c. 1337–1407)

Sir William Percy (c. 1337–1407) was an English politician. He sat as MP for Sussex in October 1377, 1379, January 1380, February 1383, October 1383, November 1384, January 1390, November 1390, 1391, 1393, 1394 and January 1397.

He was knighted before December 1364.

== Political career ==
He also served as justice of the peace in Sussex from 2 July 1377 till December 1382 and 10 February 1385 till July 1397; Sheriff of Surrey and Sussex from 26 November 1377 till 25 November 1378 and 1 November 1381 till 16 December 1382; tax surveyor of Sussex in August 137; and tax collector in December 1384.

== Family ==
He was the son of John Percy (died 1339) by Elizabeth, the daughter and heiress of John Hartridge. Before 1354, he married Mary (died 1420), the daughter of William Filoll.
