= Perci (Tar-Vabriga) =

Perci Perzi
- Village
- Location within Croatia
- Coordinates: 45°17′35″N 13°38′35″E
- Country: Croatia
- County: Istria County
- Municipality: Tar-Vabriga

Area
  - Total: 0.69 sq mi (1.8 km^{2})

Population (2021)
  - Total: 124
  - Density: 180/sq mi (69/km^{2})
- Time zone: UTC+1 (CET)
  - Summer (DST): UTC+2 (CEST)
- Postal code: 52465 Tar
- Area code: 052

Perci (Italian: Perzi) is a village in Tar-Vabriga municipality in Istria County, Croatia.

== Demographics ==
According to the 2021 census, its population was 124. It was 69 in 2001.
