= Percy William Justyne =

English painter

Percy William Justyne (1812 – 6 June 1883) was an English artist and book illustrator.

== Biography ==
Justyne was the son of Percy and Anne Justyne, was born at Rochester in Kent in 1812. He was educated for the Royal Navy, and went on a surveying expedition in H.M.S. Nimble, but considerations of health led him to give up that profession, and he completed his education at a school at Mitcham, Surrey. He developed a taste for art, and practiced landscape painting. In 1837 he sent a landscape to the Suffolk Street exhibition, and in 1838 exhibited ‘A Scene in the Alps by Moonlight’ at the Royal Academy. From 1841 to 1845 he was private secretary to Major-general Charles Joseph Doyle, governor of the island of Grenada in the West Indies; he afterwards served as acting stipendiary magistrate in the island, and on Doyle's death in 1848 returned to England. He now practiced regularly as an artist, and became noted for his skill as an illustrator of books. He was employed on the ‘Illustrated London News’ in 1849 and 1850, the ‘Graphic,’ the ‘London Journal,’ the ‘National Magazine,’ the ‘Floral World,’ and the ‘Building News.’ He illustrated the ‘Art Journal’ catalogues of the International Exhibitions in 1851 and 1862; Dr. Smith's ‘History of Greece’ and ‘Biblical Dictionary,’ &c.; Fergusson's ‘Handbook of Architecture;’ Rawlinson's ‘Five Monarchies;’ Dean Stanley's ‘Memorials of Westminster Abbey;’ Cassell's ‘Bible’ and ‘Bible Dictionary;’ Charles Kingsley's ‘Christmas in the Tropics,’ and Miss Meteyard's ‘Life of Josiah Wedgwood.’ Justyne died on 6 June 1883 and was buried at Norwood Cemetery. He left a family, of whom the youngest daughter married Mr. W. H. Arnold.

== Gallery ==
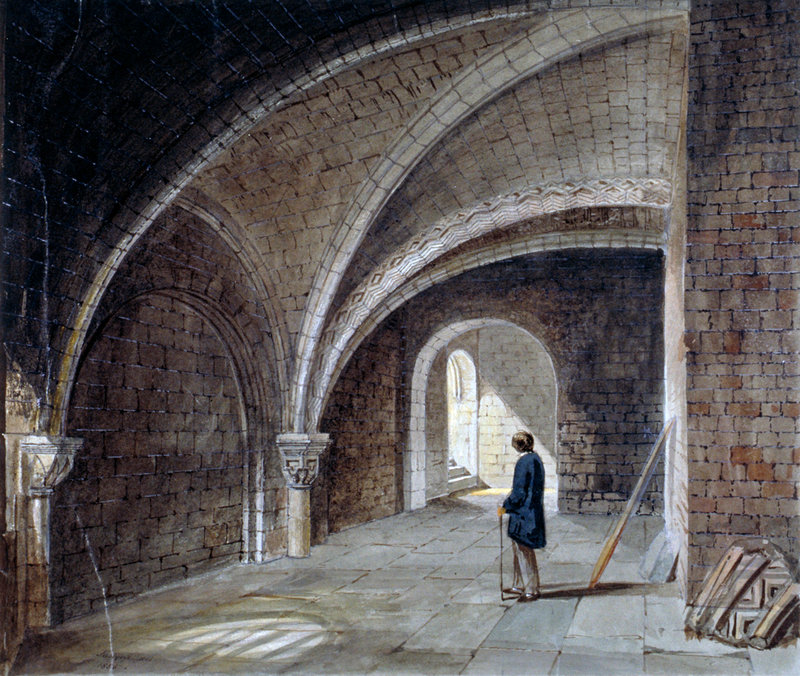
Crypt under the Church of St James in the Wall, Wood Street Square, City of London

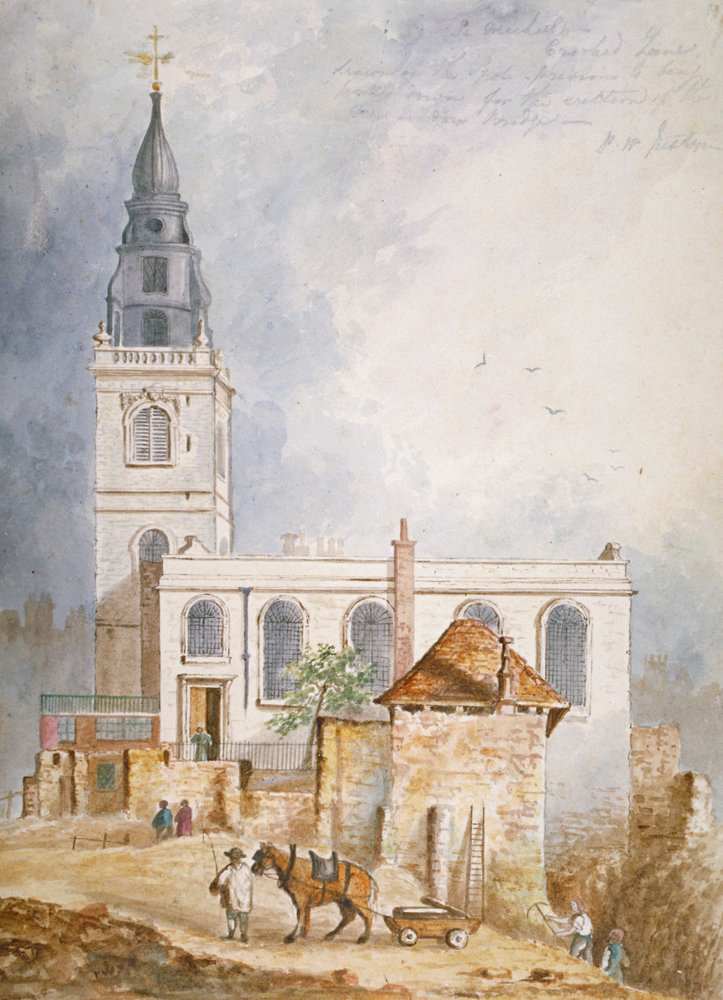
View of the Church of St Michael, Crooked Lane, City of London

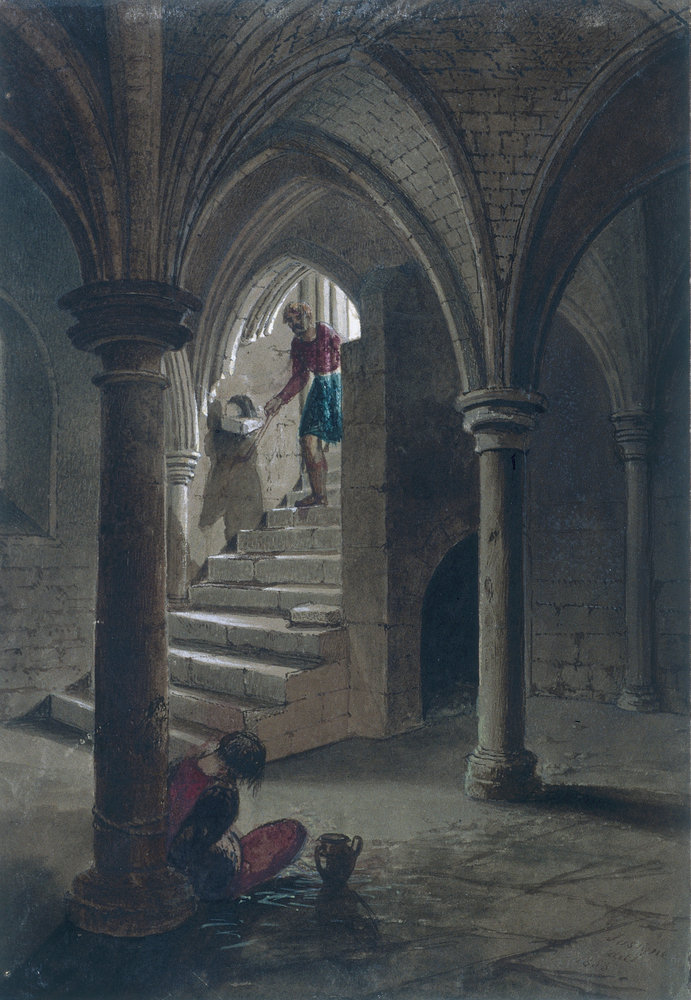
Gerard's Hall, London

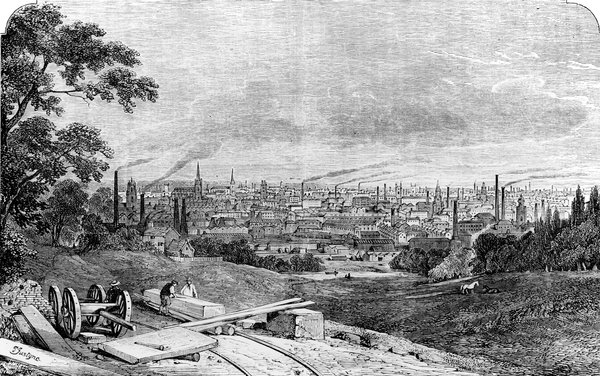
Manchester, 1840 (engraving)

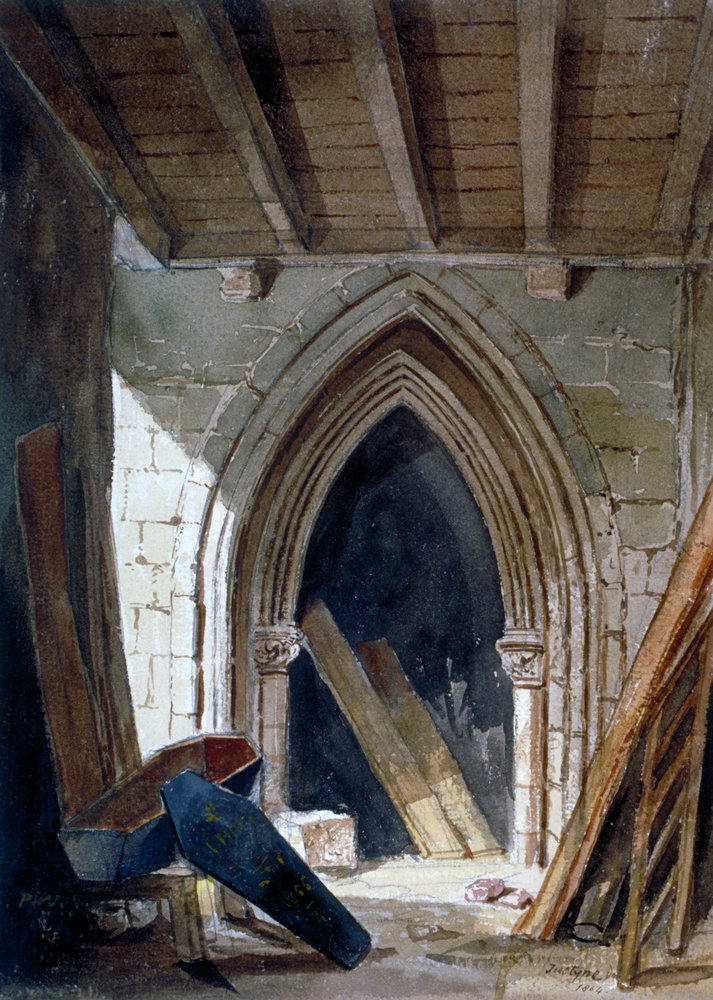
Crypt of St Anne, Blackfriars, City of London

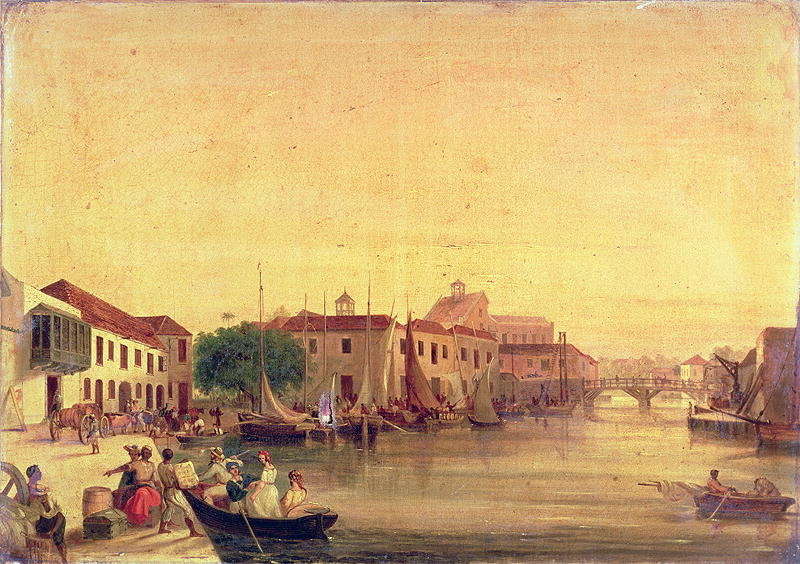
The Careenage, Bridgetown, Barbados

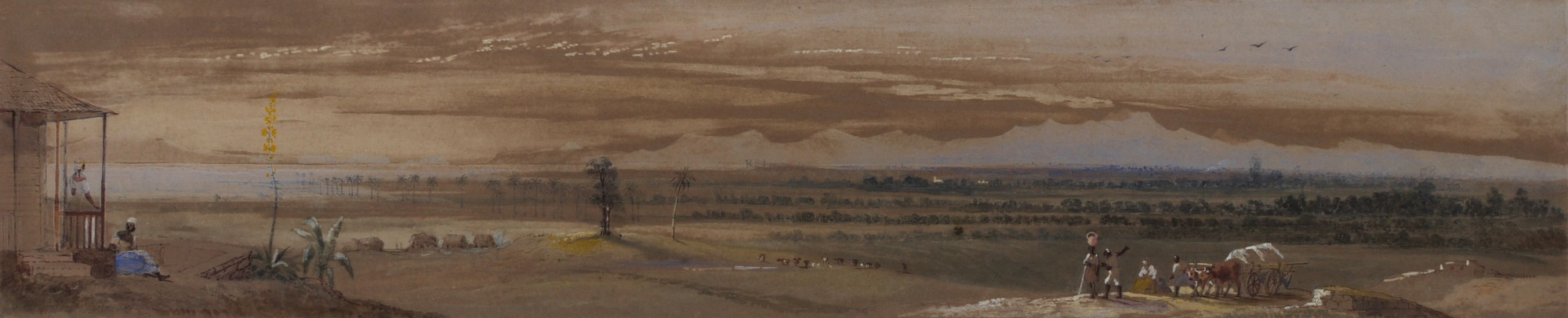
La Brea, Trinidad, 1841 (watercolour)
