= Alf Percy =

Scottish footballer

Personal information
- Full name: Andrew Main Alfred Percy
- Date of birth: 1912
- Place of birth: Newmains, Scotland
- Place of death: Newmains, Scotland
- Position: Outside left

Senior career*
Years	Team	Apps	(Gls)
- Newmains
–1932	Lesmahagow		
1932–1934	Leith Athletic	50	(10)
1934	East Stirlingshire	12	(3)
1935	Montrose	1	(0)
- Cork City
–1939	Ilford		
1939	Clapton Orient	4	(0)
- Plymouth Argyle
- * Club domestic league appearances and goals

Andrew Main Alfred Percy was a Scottish professional footballer who played as an outside left in the Scottish League for Leith Athletic, East Stirlingshire and Montrose. He also played in the Football League for Clapton Orient.

== Career statistics ==
Appearances and goals by club, season and competition
Club	Season	League			National Cup		Total	
Club	Season	Division	Apps	Goals	Apps	Goals	Apps	Goals
Leith Athletic	1932–33	Scottish Second Division	23	5	3	1	26	6
Leith Athletic	1933–34	Scottish Second Division	27	5	1	0	28	5
Leith Athletic	Total		50	10	4	1	54	11
East Stirlingshire	1934–35	Scottish Second Division	12	3	―		12	3
Montrose	1934–35	Scottish Second Division	1	0	1	0	2	0
Clapton Orient	1938–39	Third Division South	4	0	―		4	0
Career total			67	13	5	1	72	14
