= Persis (given name) =

Persis is a feminine given name, meaning "from Persia". Notable people with the name include:

- Persis Drell (born 1955), American physicist
- Persis Karim (born 1962), American poet, editor, educator
- Persis Khambatta (1948–1998), Indian actress and model
- Persis Kirmse (1884–1955), British painter
- Persis Goodale Thurston Taylor (1821–1906), Hawaiian artist
- Persis Robertson (1896–1992), American artist
