= Percy Rodriguez (disambiguation) =

Percy Rodriguez was a Canadian actor.

Percy ROdriguez may also refer to:

- Percy Rodriguez (footballer) (1893–1917), Australian rules footballer
- Percy Rodríguez (fl. 2003–2007), Costa Rican politician
