= Percy Williams =

Percy Williams may refer to:

- Percy Williams (sprinter) (1908–1982), Canadian athlete
- Percy Williams (New Zealand rugby league player), played for Wigan and New Zealand in the 1910s
- Percy Williams (Australian rugby league player) (1910–1996), played for New South Wales and Australia in the 1930s
- Percy Williams (rugby union) (born 1993), South African rugby union player
- Percy G. Williams (1857–1923), American vaudeville performer, theater owner and manager
- Percy Williams, American actor in 1927 film London After Midnight (film)
