= Percy Dawson (lawyer) =

Australian lawyer

Percy Sydney Dawson
- Born: 1865; Cooma, New South Wales
- Died: 1916 (aged 50–51); Wahroonga, New South Wales
- Education: Newington College; University of Sydney
- Occupation: Solicitor
- Title: City of Sydney Solicitor
- Spouse: Miss Neilson of Waratah
- Children: 1 son 3 daughters
- Website: Blake Dawson's History

Percy Sydney Dawson (1865–1916) was a founding partner of one of the legal firms that became Blake Dawson (now Ashurst Australia) and the first City Solicitor of the City of Sydney.

== Early life ==
Dawson was born in Cooma, New South Wales, and educated at Newington College (1881–1883) and the University of Sydney. He was the eighth son of Robert Dawson, who was for over 40 years the police magistrate in Cooma.

== Legal career ==
In 1886 Dawson was articled to solicitor George Charles King Waldron, and upon admission as a solicitor in 1891 the firm became known as Waldron & Dawson.

== City Solicitor ==
On 9 February 1899, Dawson was appointed as the first City Solicitor for the City of Sydney.

== Death ==
Dawson died at home in the Sydney suburb of Wahroonga and was at the time the senior partner of the legal firm then known as Dawson, Waldron, and Glover, of Pitt Street. He was survived by a widow and four children, and his papers are held by the State Library of New South Wales.
