= Katie Doores =

British biochemist

Katie J. Doores
- Born: Katherine Jane Doores; United Kingdom
- Education: University of Oxford
- Occupation: Biochemist
- Years active: 2007–present

Katherine Jane Doores is a British biochemist who is a senior lecturer in the School of Immunology & Microbial Sciences at King's College London. During the COVID-19 pandemic Doores studied the levels of antibodies in patients who had suffered from COVID-19.

== Early life and education ==
Doores was born in the United Kingdom. In 2003, Doores received an MChem in chemistry from the University of Oxford. In 2008, Doores received a PhD in organic chemistry from the University of Oxford. Ben G. Davis was her advisor. In 2013, she completed post doctoral work in the Department of Immunology and Microbial Sciences at the Scripps Research Institute in La Jolla, California.

== Research and career ==
When Doores was a graduate student at Oxford, she studied glycoimmunology in the laboratory of professor Davis. Glycoimmunology is an emerging research field which looks at how immune response is moderated by carbohydrates (glycans). At the Scripps Research Institute as part of her post doctoral work, she worked on the glycobiology on HIV and broadly-neutralizing antibodies. At Scripps, Doores worked alongside Dennis Burton, where she studied the "flower-like" envelope protein on HIV. These envelope protein penetrates host cells and create antibody-resistant glycans. By investigating this envelope protein, Doores looked to identify sites which are involved with viral function. By neutralising sites such as these (the high-mannose patch), Doores hoped to protect against HIV infection.

From 2013 to 2017, Doores was a lecturer in the Department of Infectious Diseases at King's College London. Doores was awarded a Medical Research Council fellowship to establish her own laboratory at King's College. She was made a European Molecular Biology Organization (EMBO) Young Investigator in 2017. In 2017, Doores became a senior lecturer in the Department of Infectious Diseases at King's College.

Many disease-causing pathogens are coated in carbohydrates. Moores investigates the behaviour of these carbohydrates in host–pathogen interactions. She hopes that by understanding the role of these carbohydrates it will be possible to develop novel therapeutic strategies and vaccinations. Alongside developing new medical therapies, Moores is interested in how the body responds to carbohydrate antigens in the form of antibody recognition. Her work has primarily focussed on the carbohydrate antigens on HIV-1. The envelope glycoprotein GP120 of HIV-1 is covered in N-linked-glycans. These glycans are the target of BNabs (broadly neutralising HIV-1 antibodies), and Moores is studying how these antibodies evolve in vivo. This understanding will allow the develop of new vaccines that encourage the generation of antibodies that can protect against pathogenic bacteria.

During the COVID-19 pandemic Doores studied the levels of antibodies in patients who had suffered from COVID-19 in Guy's and St Thomas' NHS Foundation Trust. Her research showed that while 60% of COVID-19 patients elicited a strong antibody response, only 17% of them retained this potency three months later. In some cases, patients entirely lost their antibody response. These results implied that immunity to COVID-19 might be short lived, and that people may become reinfected during a second wave of infection.

== Selected publications ==
- Doores, Katie J. (2007). Novel Methods for the Synthesis of Glycoimmunological Probes (PhD). University of Oxford. Mathematical and Physical Sciences Division. OCLC 232193273.
- Doores, K. J.; Bonomelli, C.; Harvey, D. J.; Vasiljevic, S.; Dwek, R. A.; Burton, D. R.; Crispin, M.; Scanlan, C. N. (19 July 2010). "Envelope glycans of immunodeficiency virions are almost entirely oligomannose antigens" (PDF). Proceedings of the National Academy of Sciences. 107 (31): 13800–13805. Bibcode:2010PNAS..10713800D. doi:10.1073/PNAS.1006498107. PMC 2922250. PMID 20643940. Wikidata ()
- Doores, Katie J.; Burton, Dennis R. (15 October 2010). "Variable Loop Glycan Dependency of the Broad and Potent HIV-1-Neutralizing Antibodies PG9 and PG16". Journal of Virology. 84 (20): 10510–10521. doi:10.1128/JVI.00552-10. PMC 2950566. PMID 20686044. Wikidata ()
- Pejchal, R.; Doores, K. J.; Walker, L. M.; Khayat, R.; Huang, P.-S.; Wang, S.-K.; Stanfield, R. L.; Julien, J.-P.; Ramos, A.; Crispin, M.; Depetris, R.; Katpally, U.; Marozsan, A.; Cupo, A.; Maloveste, S.; Liu, Y.; McBride, R.; Ito, Y.; Sanders, R. W.; Ogohara, C.; Paulson, J. C.; Feizi, T.; Scanlan, C. N.; Wong, C.-H.; Moore, J. P.; Olson, W. C.; Ward, A. B.; Poignard, P.; Schief, W. R.; Burton, D. R.; Wilson, I. A. (13 October 2011). "A Potent and Broad Neutralizing Antibody Recognizes and Penetrates the HIV Glycan Shield". Science. 334 (6059): 1097–1103. Bibcode:2011Sci...334.1097P. doi:10.1126/SCIENCE.1213256. PMC 3280215. PMID 21998254. Wikidata ()
- Walker, Laura M.; Huber, Michael; Doores, Katie J.; Falkowska, Emilia; Pejchal, Robert; Julien, Jean-Philippe; Wang, Sheng-Kai; Ramos, Alejandra; Chan-Hui, Po-Ying; Moyle, Matthew; Mitcham, Jennifer L.; Hammond, Phillip W.; Olsen, Ole A.; Phung, Pham; Fling, Steven; Wong, Chi-Huey; Phogat, Sanjay; Wrin, Terri; Simek, Melissa D.; Principal Investigators, Protocol G.; Koff, Wayne C.; Wilson, Ian A.; Burton, Dennis R.; Poignard, Pascal (22 September 2011). "Broad neutralization coverage of HIV by multiple highly potent antibodies". Nature. 477 (7365): 466–470. Bibcode:2011Natur.477..466W. doi:10.1038/NATURE10373. PMC 3393110. PMID 21849977. Wikidata ()
- Sok, D.; Doores, K. J.; Briney, B.; Le, K. M.; Saye-Francisco, K. L.; Ramos, A.; Kulp, D. W.; Julien, J.-P.; Menis, S.; Wickramasinghe, L.; Seaman, M. S.; Schief, W. R.; Wilson, I. A.; Poignard, P.; Burton, D. R. (14 May 2014). "Promiscuous Glycan Site Recognition by Antibodies to the High-Mannose Patch of gp120 Broadens Neutralization of HIV". Science Translational Medicine. 6 (236): 236ra63. doi:10.1126/SCITRANSLMED.3008104. PMC 4095976. PMID 24828077. Wikidata ()
- Seabright, Gemma E.; Doores, Katie J.; Burton, Dennis R.; Crispin, Max (May 2019). "Protein and Glycan Mimicry in HIV Vaccine Design". Journal of Molecular Biology. 431 (12): 2223–2247. doi:10.1016/J.JMB.2019.04.016. PMC 6556556. PMID 31028779. Wikidata ()
- Avanzato, Victoria A.; Oguntuyo, Kasopefoluwa Y.; Escalera-Zamudio, Marina; Gutierrez, Bernardo; Golden, Michael; Kosakovsky Pond, Sergei L.; Pryce, Rhys; Walter, Thomas S.; Seow, Jeffrey; Doores, Katie J.; Pybus, Oliver G.; Munster, Vincent J.; Lee, Benhur; Bowden, Thomas A. (10 December 2019). "A structural basis for antibody-mediated neutralization of Nipah virus reveals a site of vulnerability at the fusion glycoprotein apex" (PDF). Proceedings of the National Academy of Sciences. 116 (50): 25057–25067. Bibcode:2019PNAS..11625057A. doi:10.1073/PNAS.1912503116. PMC 6911215. PMID 31767754. Wikidata ()
- Seow, Jeffrey; Graham, Carl; Merrick, Blair; Acors, Sam; Steel, Kathryn J.A.; Hemmings, Oliver; O'Bryne, Aoife; Kouphou, Neophytos; Pickering, Suzanne; Galao, Rui; Betancor, Gilberto; Wilson, Harry D; Signell, Adrian W; Winstone, Helena; Kerridge, Claire; Temperton, Nigel; Snell, Luke; Bisnauthsing, Karen; Moore, Amelia; Green, Adrian; Martinez, Lauren; Stokes, Brielle; Honey, Johanna; Izquierdo-Barras, Alba; Arbane, Gill; Patel, Amita; OConnell, Lorcan; O Hara, Geraldine; MacMahon, Eithne; Douthwaite, Sam; Nebbia, Gaia; Batra, Rahul; Martinez-Nunez, Rocio; Edgeworth, Jonathan D.; Neil, Stuart J.D.; Malim, Michael H.; Doores, Katie (2020). "Longitudinal observation and decline of neutralizing antibody responses in the three months following SARS-CoV-2 infection in humans". Nature Microbiology. 5 (12): 1598–1607. doi:10.1038/s41564-020-00813-8. medRxiv 10.1101/2020.07.09.20148429v1. PMC 7610833. PMID 33106674.
