= Percy Dawson =

Percy Dawson may refer to:

- Percy Dawson (baseball) (1889–1982), American baseball player, manager, scout, executive, and owner
- Percy Dawson (footballer) (1890–1974), English footballer with Hearts and Blackburn
- Percy Dawson (lawyer) (1865–1916), Australian lawyer

== See also ==
- Dawson (surname)
