= Percy Paris (minister) =

Percy Paris

Percy Reginald Paris (22 June 1882 – 29 March 1942) was a New Zealand Methodist minister, editor, writer, and political and social reformer.

Paris was born in Dunedin, Otago, in 1882. He became a Methodist minister in 1906. For many years he edited the national publication The Methodist Times. He became president of the Methodist conference in 1938.

He died suddenly, aged 59, before conducting the evening service at Wesley Church, Taranaki Street, Wellington. He had been the minister at the church since 1935. He left a widow and two daughters.
