= Samuel Percy =

Irish sculptor (1750–1820)

- Born: 1750; Dublin
- Died: 1820 (aged 69–70); London, England
- Education: Dublin Society's Schools
- Known for: Wax sculptor portraiture

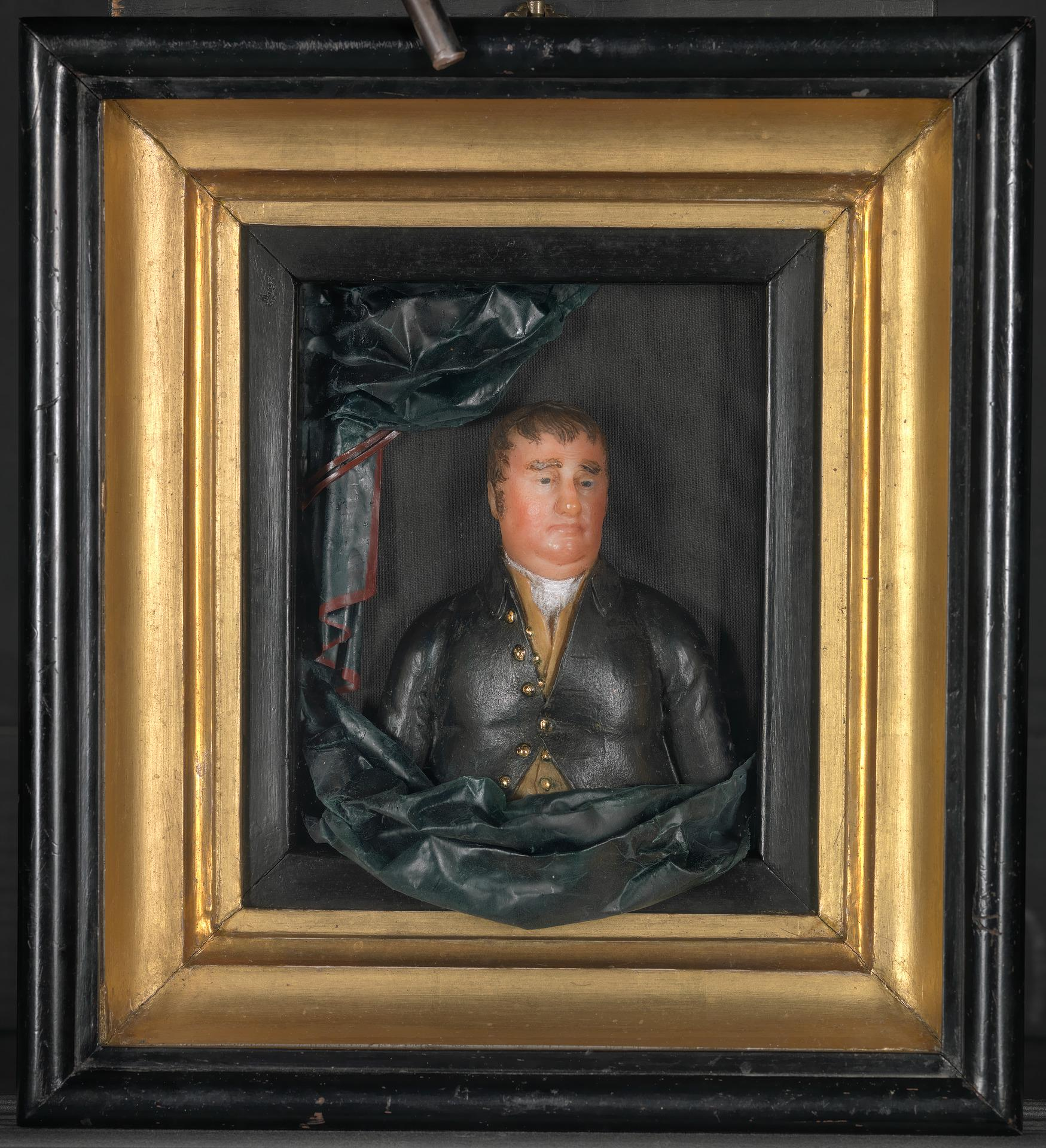
Charles James Fox by Samuel Percy

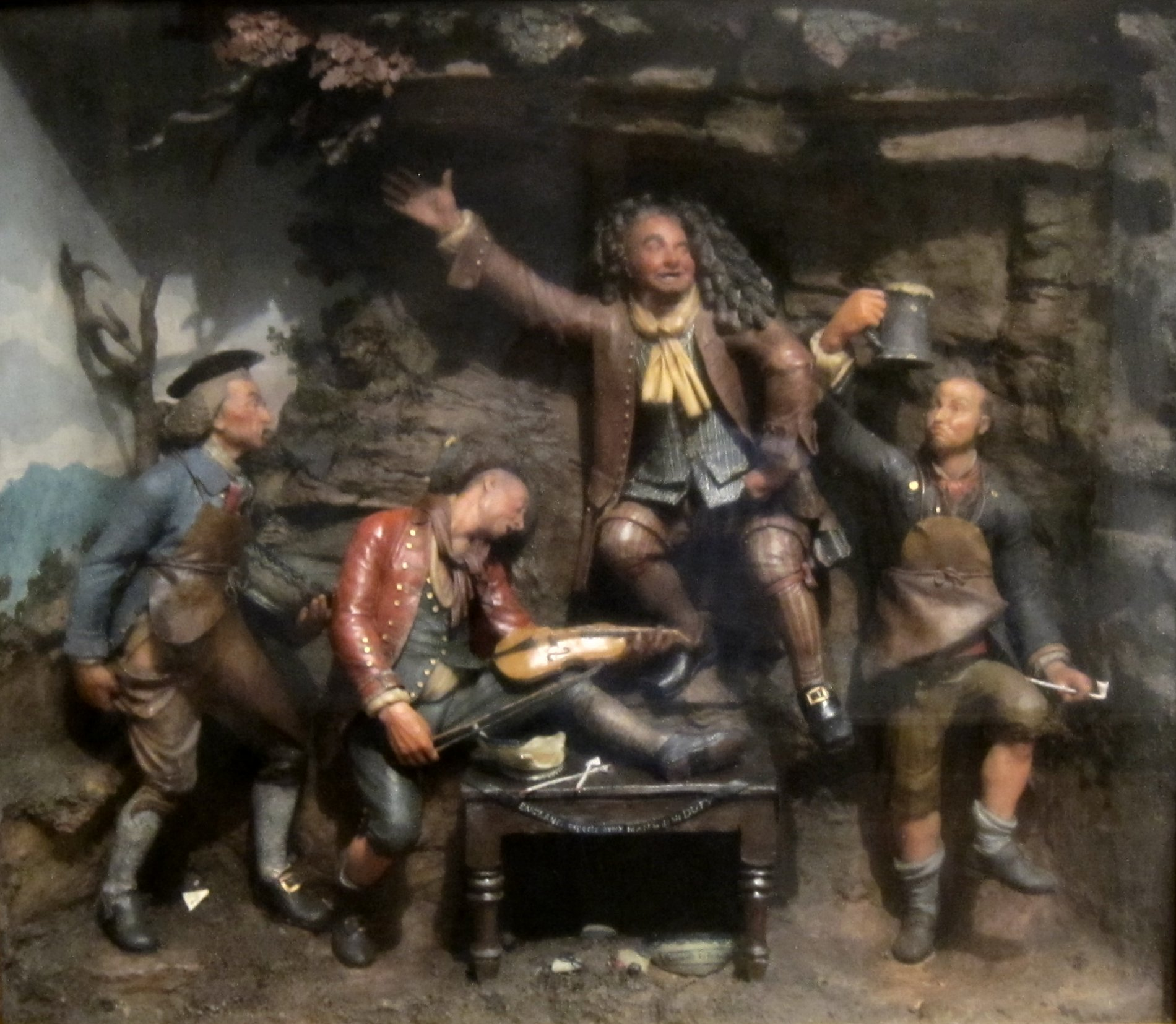
The Progress of Inebriety (later panel) wrongly identified as 'England Expects Every Man to Do His Duty', polychromed wax sculpture by Samuel Percy

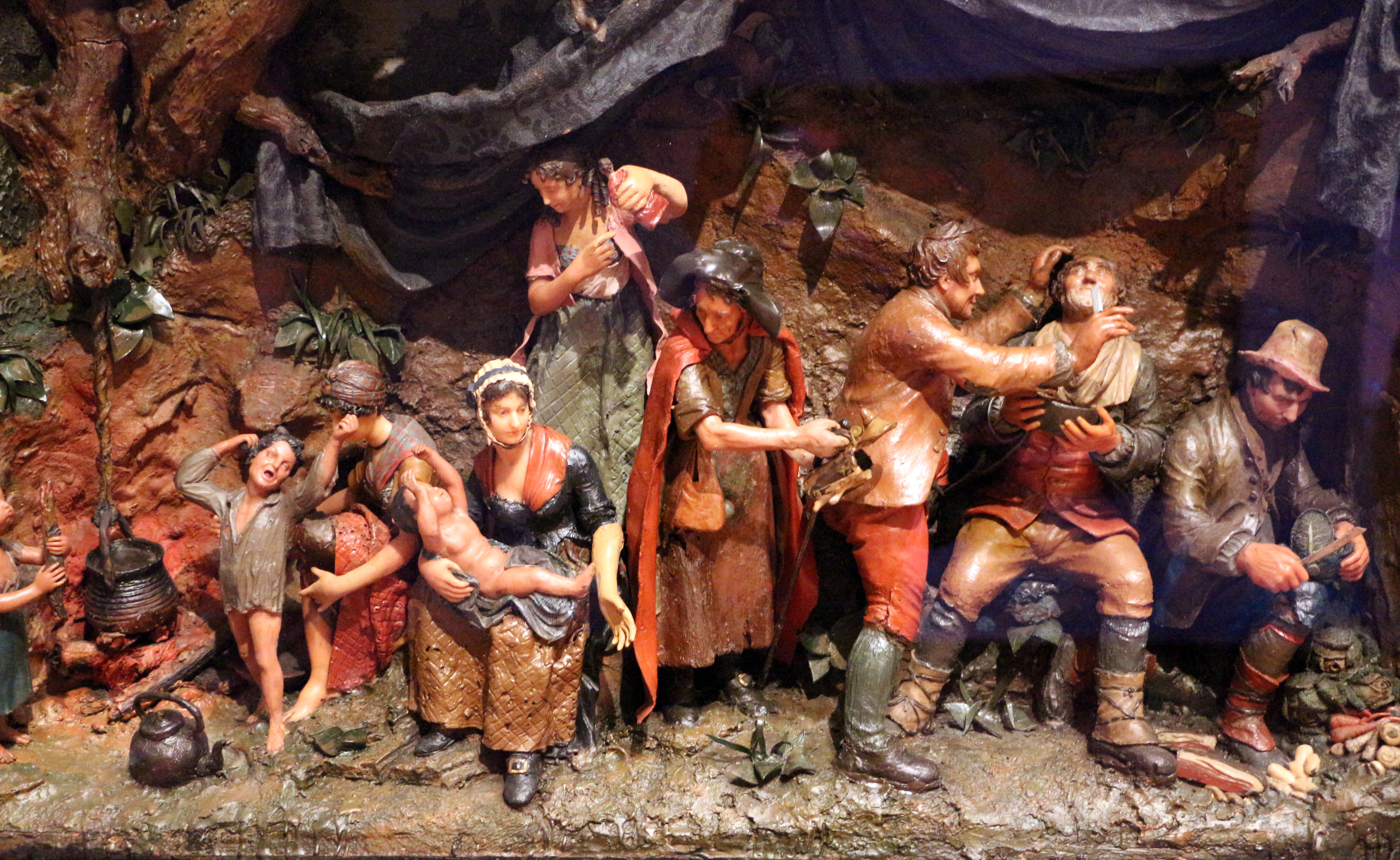
Rustic scene by Samuel Percy

Samuel Percy (1750–1820) was an Irish-born sculptor mainly working as a wax-modeller in England. He has a unique style, creating three dimensional miniature portraits in coloured wax.

== Life ==
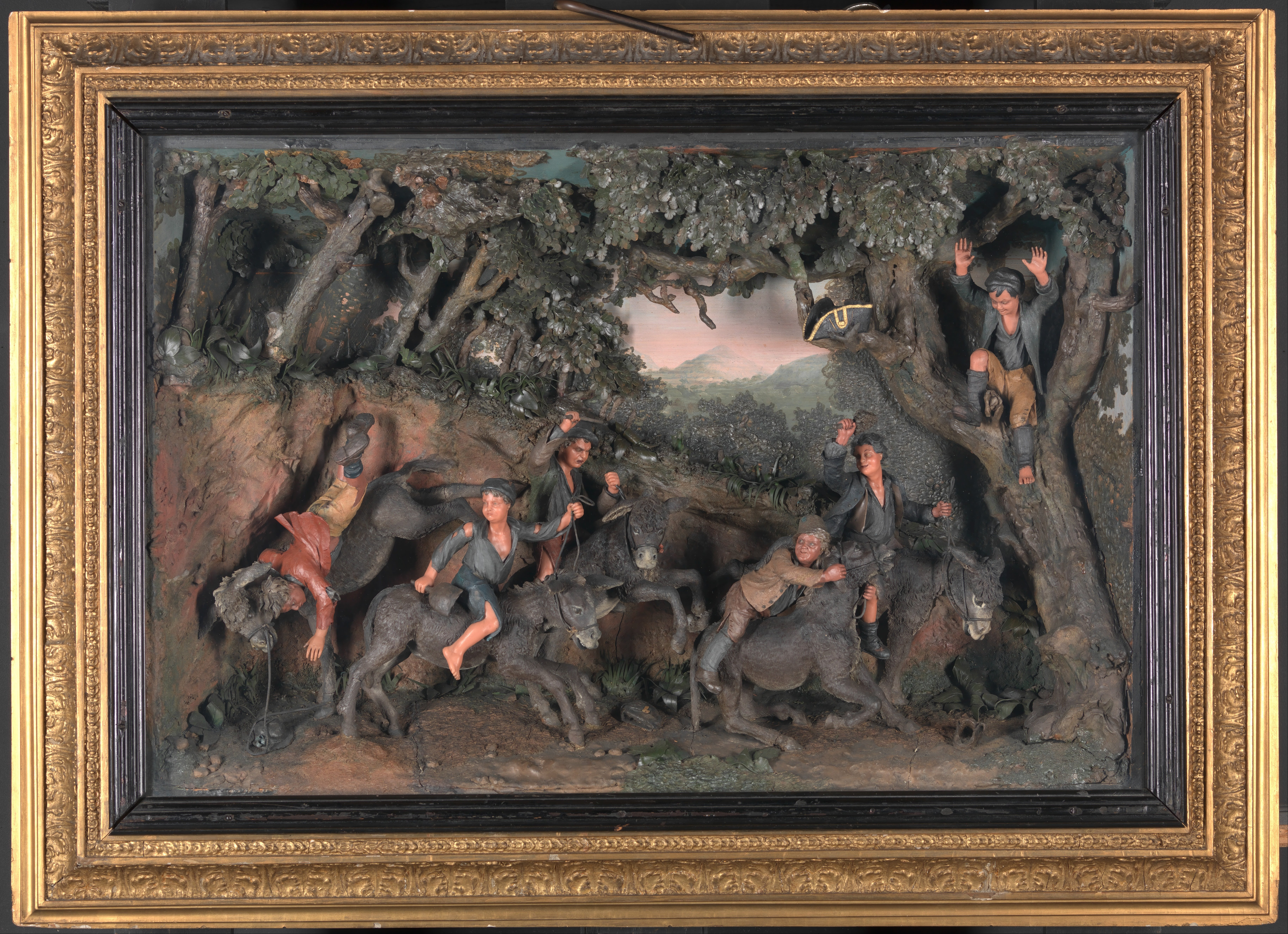
A Race of Chimney-sweeps on Donkeys by Samuel Percy

He was born and raised in Dublin and trained at the Dublin Society's Schools, exhibiting from 1772. He left Ireland and moved to London around 1785 and lived there for the rest of his life.

He exhibited in the Royal Academy from 1786 to 1804. He died suddenly of apoplexy in 1820.

== Works ==
- Abraham offering Isaac (1772)
- Portrait of the Emperor and Empress of Russia (1788)
- Portrait of Louis XVI
- Portrait of King George III (1795) at Windsor Castle
- Portrait of Queen Charlotte (1795) at Windsor Castle
- Model for Monument to Admiral Nelson (1806)
- Portrait of Joshua McGough of Drumsill (1811)
- A Woman with Children Gathering Apples at Victoria and Albert Museum
- Portrait of Princess Charlotte Augusta of Wales (1814) National Portrait Gallery, London
- Portrait of Mrs Elizabeth Best (dnk) at Victoria and Albert Museum
- Portrait of Richard Reynolds of Bristol (1817) National Portrait Gallery, London
- The Death of Voltaire (dnk)
- The Three Musicians (dnk)
- Portrait of Lady Barrington (dnk) at Victoria and Albert Museum
- Portrait of Sir Arthur Paget (dnk) at Victoria and Albert Museum
- Portrait of Sir Charles Morgan at Tredegar Park (dnk)
- The Progress of Inebriety (a series of at least three panels)
- Frederick the Great in his Last Illness
- A Blind Beggar
- Dead Christ
- Portrait of Count Struensee
- Portrait of the Duke of Leeds
- Portrait of Judge James Eyre
- Portrait of Judge Wilson
- Portrait of Lord Romney
- Portrait of Lord Kenyon
- Portrait of the Duke of Richmond
- Portrait of Tom Paine
- Portrait of Lord Thurlow
- Portrait of the actor John Henderson
- Portrait of Lady Menteith
- Portrait of General William Haviland
- Portrait of Admiral Reddam
- Portrait of Lord Rockingham
- Portrait of Prince Leopold (1820)

== Family ==
Not known
