= John Percy =

John Percy may refer to:

- John Percy (Jesuit) (1569–1641), English Jesuit priest and controversialist
- John Percy (metallurgist) (1817–1889), English physician and metallurgist
- John de Percy, MP for Coventry
