= Piercy =

Piercy may refer to:

== People ==
=== Surname ===
- Andy Piercy (fl. from 1974), British singer-songwriter
- Andy Piercy (baseball) (1855–1932), American baseball player
- Benjamin Piercy (1827–1888), British civil engineer
- Bill Piercy (1896–1951), American baseball player
- Charles Wesley Piercy (1833–1861), American politician
- Clive Piercy (1955–2017), British-American designer, author, and design educator
- Curt Piercy (1962 – 2004), American racing driver
- Doug Piercy (fl. from 1985), American guitarist
- Edward Piercy (1882–1968), British cyclist
- Esther J. Piercy (1905–1967), American librarian and cataloger
- Frank Piercy (1879–1931), English footballer
- Jeff Piercy (born 1983), Canadian football player
- John Piercy (born 1979), English footballer
- Kitty Piercy (born 1942), American politician
- Marge Piercy (born 1936), American novelist and poet
- Pam Piercy (born 1937), Former British athlete
- Rob Piercy (born 1946), British artist
- Sarah Piercy (born 1980), British wheelchair athlete
- Scott Piercy (born 1978), American professional golfer
- Thomas Piercy (fl. from 1993), American musician
- Violet Piercy (1889–1972), English long-distance runner
- William Piercy, 1st Baron Piercy (1886–1966), British economist and businessman
  - Baron Piercy, Barony in the Peerage of the United Kingdom

=== Given name ===
- William Piercy Austin (1807–1892), Anglican Bishop of British Guiana
- Charles Piercy Mills (1914–2006), Royal Navy officer
- Piercy Morrison (1868–1936), England international rugby union player
- Piercy Ravenstone (fl. 1821-1824), British economist, pseudonym
- Piercy Roberts (fl. 1785–1824), English publisher, printmaker and caricaturist

== Places ==
- Piercy, California, unincorporated community

== See also ==
- Piercey (disambiguation)
- Peircy Brett (1709–1781), Royal Navy Admiral
