= Carport =

Covered structure protecting vehicles

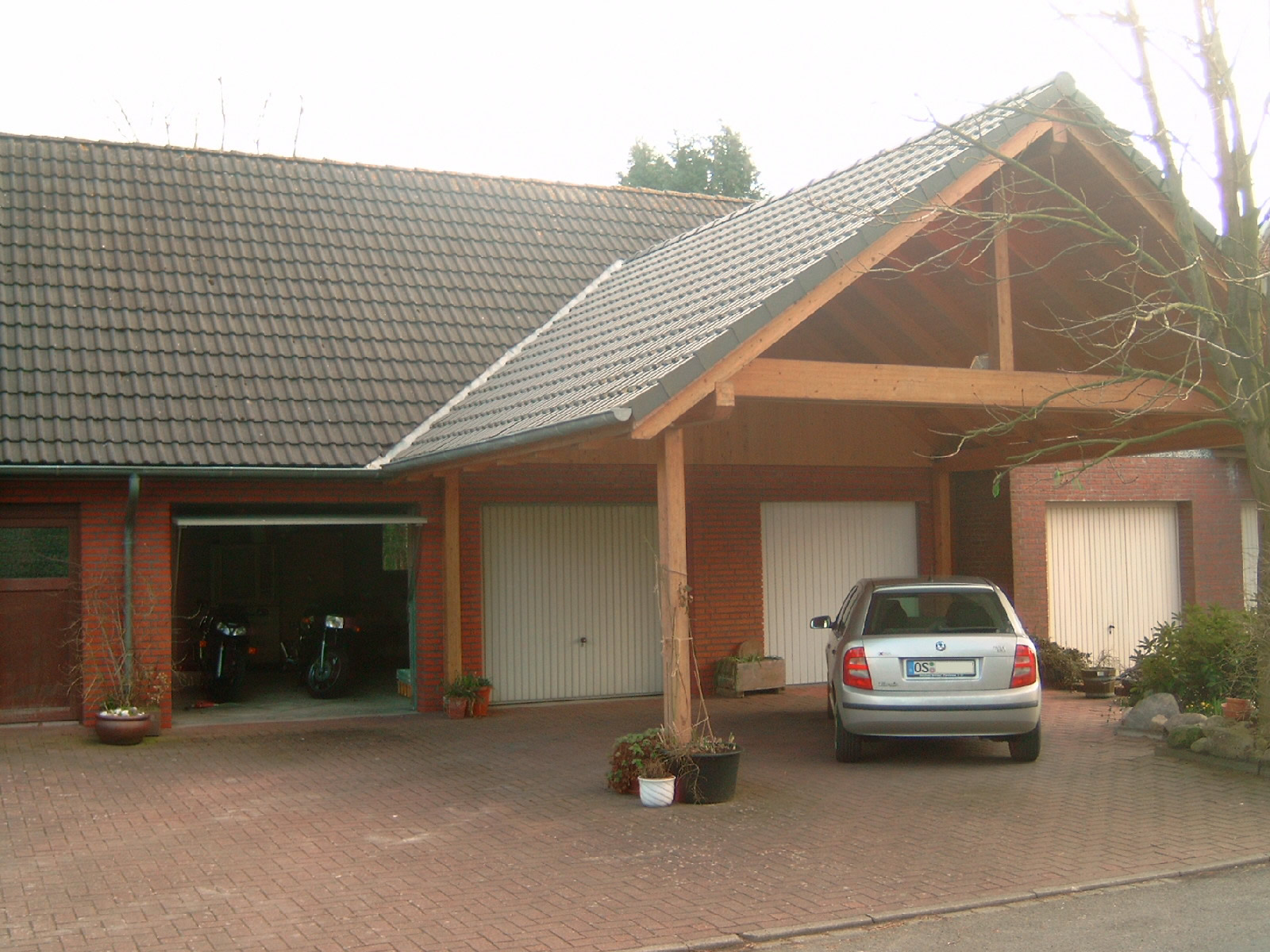
A porch-type carport in front of garages

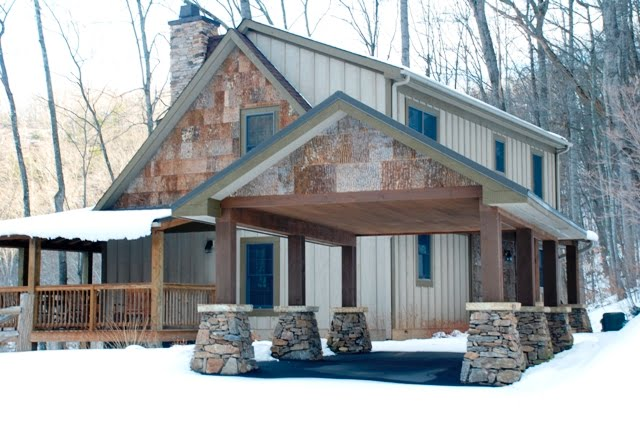
A free-standing carport, one example of the many common types of modern carports on the real estate market.

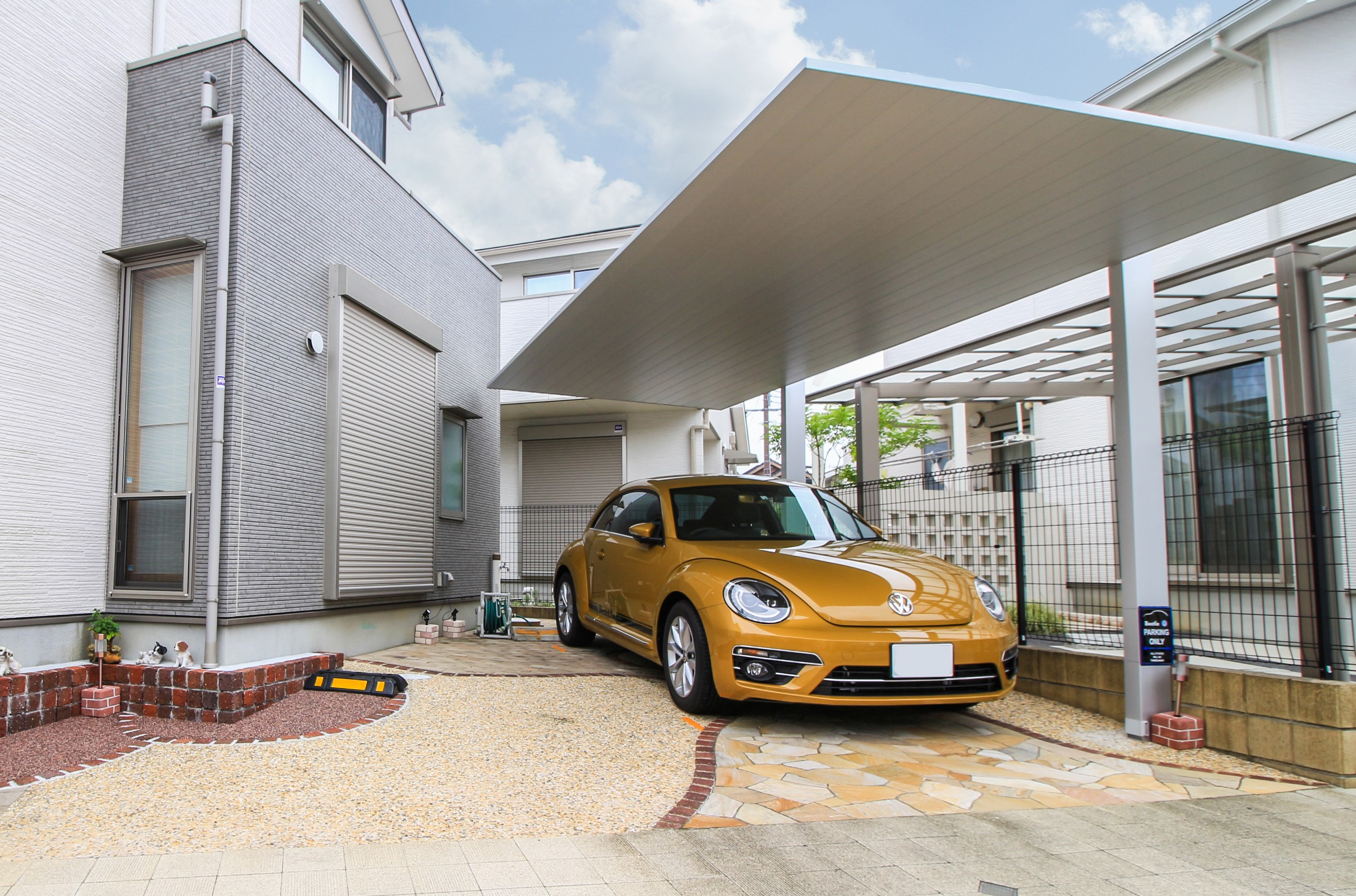
A bike shed-type carport in Japan

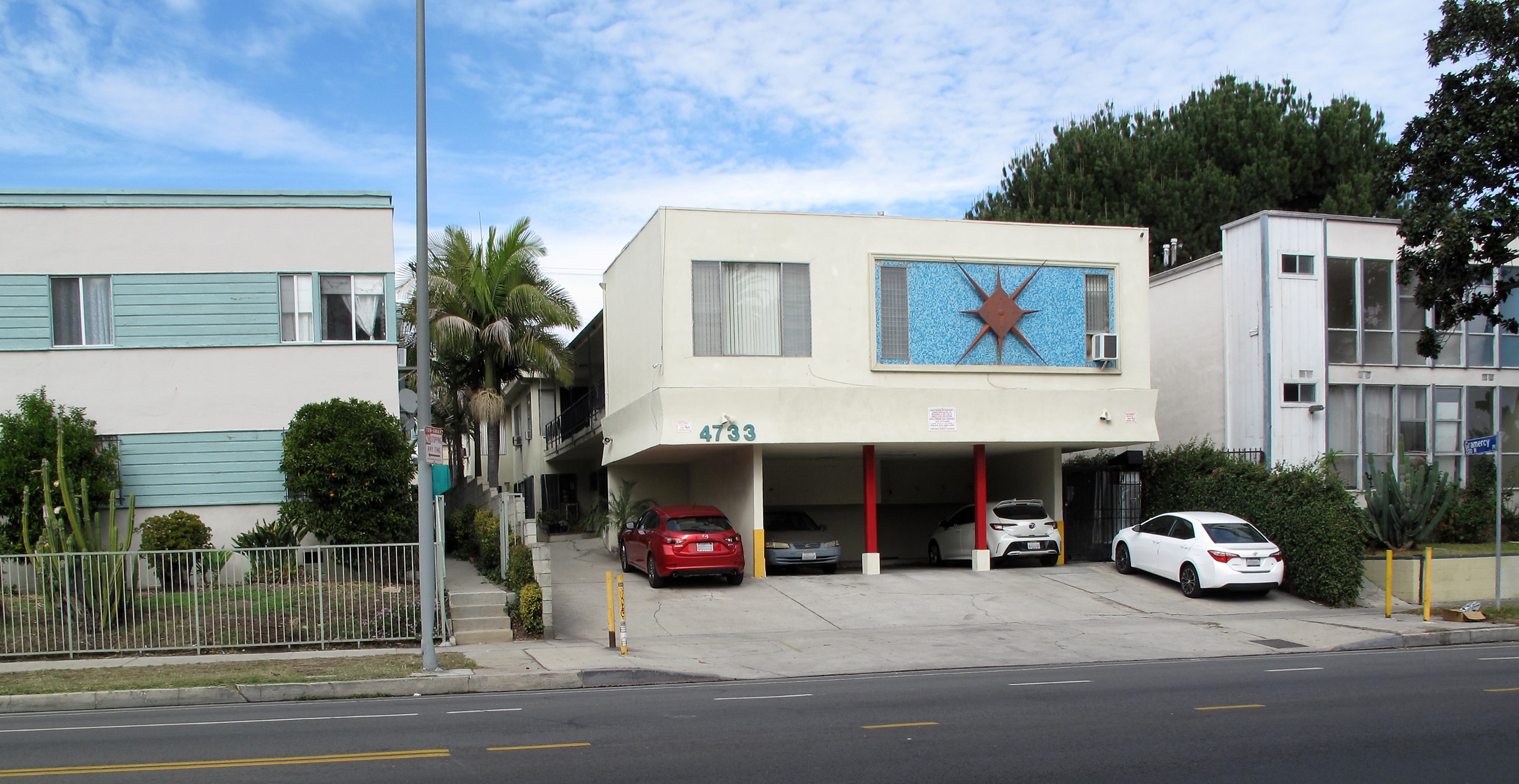
Dingbat apartment with recessed carports, Los Angeles, USA

A carport is an open-wall shed or roofed parking space used to offer limited shading and weather protection to road vehicles, primarily automobiles. Unlike most roofed structures, a carport does not have walls on all sides, and typically has no door. Carports can either be free-standing canopy supported by pillars/posts and beams (i.e. a pavilion or gazebo), a driveway under a porch (i.e. a porte cochère), a recessed parking space (e.g. below an upstairs room) or an undercroft (e.g. under a stilt house or soft-story building), or simply a large balcony or awning overhanging above the car space. Compared to the fully enclosed garages, carports offer less sheltering from rain, snow, hail and frost, but are cheaper to build and allow for more ventilation. In particular, a carport can reduce frosting on the windshield due to more readily evaporation of dew condensations.

A "mobile" and/or "enclosed" carport has the same purpose as a standard carport. However, it may be removed/relocated and is typically framed with tubular steel and may have tent-like canvas or vinyl covering that encloses the complete frame, including the sides. It may have an accessible front entry or open entryway not typically attached to any structure or fastened in place by permanent means put held in place by stakes. It is differentiated from a tent by its main purpose: to house vehicles and/or motorized equipment (a tent is to shelter people).

== History ==
The term carport comes from the French term porte-cochère, referring to a covered portal. Renowned architect Frank Lloyd Wright coined the term when he used a carport in the first of his "Usonian" home designs: the house of Herbert Jacobs, built in 1936 in Madison, Wisconsin.

Quoting from the Carport Integrity Policy for the Arizona State Historic Preservation Office:

As early as 1909, carports were used by the Prairie School architect Walter Burley Griffin in his design for the Sloane House in Elmhurst, Illinois (Gebhard, 1991: 110). By 1913, carports were also being employed by other Prairie School architects such as the Minneapolis firm of Purcell, Feick & Elmslie in their design for a residence at Lockwood Lake, Wisconsin. In this instance, the carport was termed an "Auto Space" (Gebhard, 1991: 110). The late architectural historian David Gebhard suggested that the term "carport" originated from the feature's use in 1930s Streamline Moderne residences (Gebhard, 1991: 107). This term, which entered popular jargon in 1939, stemmed from the visual connection between these streamlined residences and nautical imagery. In the 1930s through the 1950s, carports were also being used by Frank Lloyd Wright in his Usonian Houses, an idea that he may have gotten from Griffin, a former associate.

The W. B. Sloane House in Elmhurst, Illinois, in 1910, is credited as being the first known home designed with a carport.

In describing the carport to Mr. Jacobs, architect Wright said, "A car is not a horse, and it doesn't need a barn." He then added, "Cars are built well enough now so that they do not require elaborate shelter." Cars prior to this time were not completely water tight; the era of robotic-assembly, advanced materials, and perfect closure lines was still 50 years in the future.

The carport was therefore a cheap and effective device for protecting a car. Mr. Jacobs added: "Our cheap second-hand car had stood out all winter at the curb, often in weather far below zero (Fahrenheit). A carport was a downright luxury for it."

== Carport components ==
Carports are composed of several essential parts that contribute to their structural integrity and functionality. The primary components include:

- Frame: The supporting structure of a carport, typically made from steel, aluminum, or wood. It provides stability and determines the overall durability of the carport.
- Roof panels: These panels protect vehicles from the elements. They are commonly constructed from metal, polycarbonate, or fabric materials, depending on the design and intended use.
- Leg posts: The vertical supports that hold up the carport roof, available in different thicknesses and materials to support various load capacities.
- Anchors: Used to secure the carport to the ground, anchors help stabilize the structure against wind and other environmental factors. Different types include rebar anchors, mobile home anchors, and concrete anchors.
- Gables and side panels: Optional features that add additional protection and aesthetic appeal by partially enclosing the sides or ends of the carport.

Carports may also include additional features such as gutters for drainage, braces for extra support, and enclosures to convert them into partially or fully enclosed spaces.

== Solar canopy ==
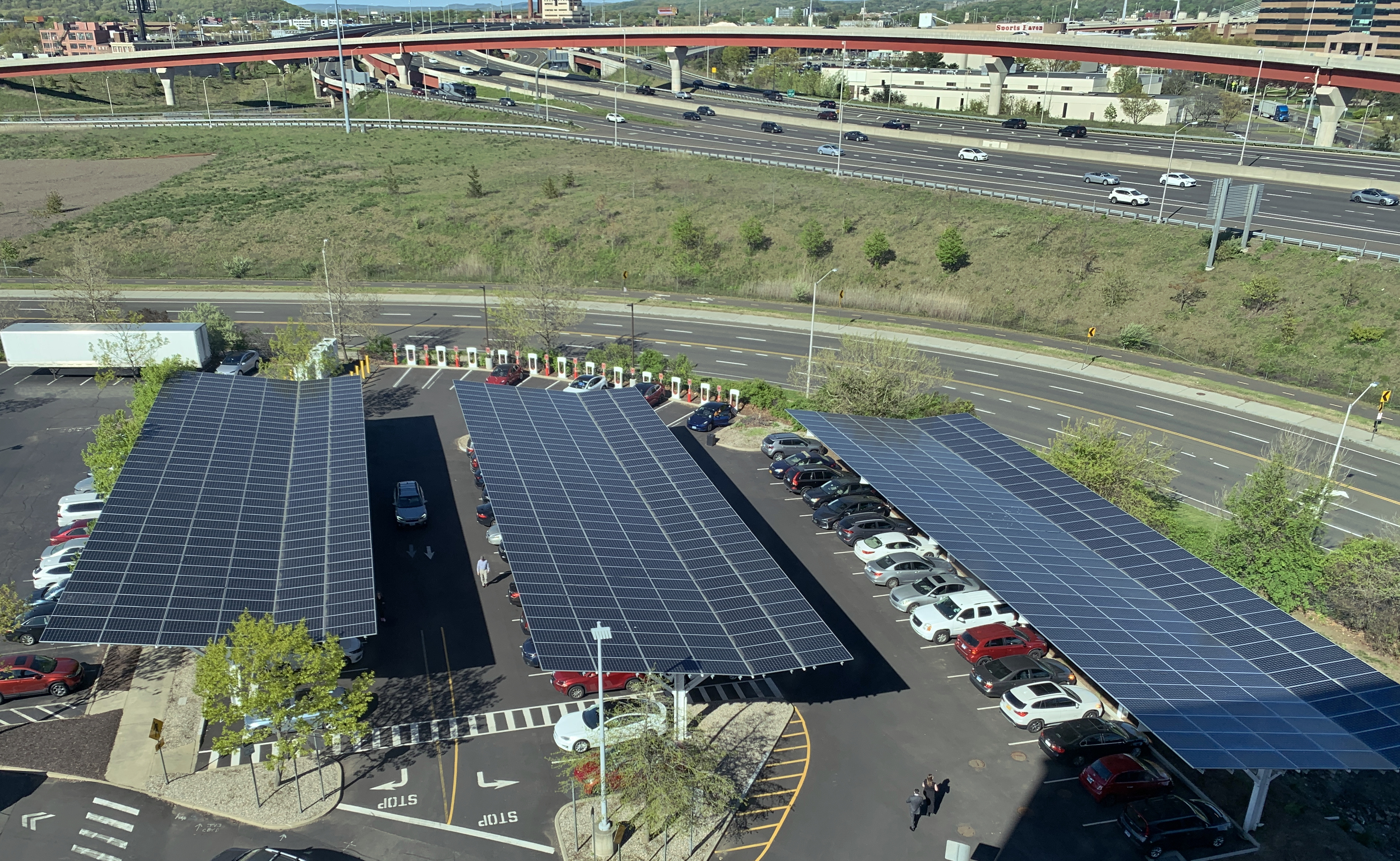
Solar canopy parking lot in New Haven at Hotel Marcel. There are EV level 2 chargers underneath the canopy and a 12-stall Tesla supercharger behind.

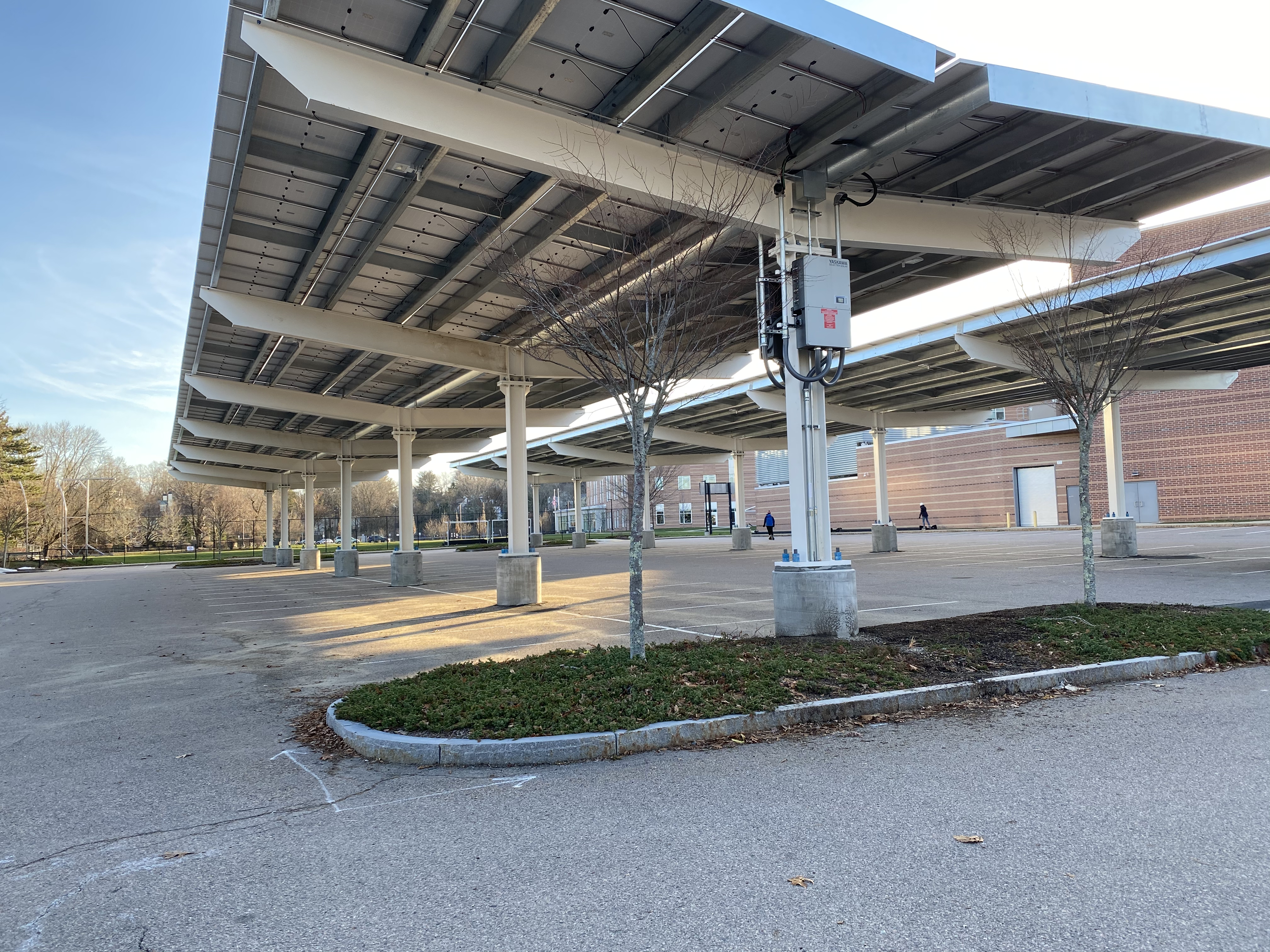
Solar canopies over a high school parking lot

A solar canopy carport is a structure that elevates an array of photovoltaic panels above ground level so that the area under the panels can be used for other purposes. Many solar canopies are built over parking lots, where in addition to generating renewable power, they also protect the cars from sun, rain and snow. When the lot is not needed for parking, the covered area can be used for other purposes.
