= Piercey =

Piercey is used as a surname and as a given name. Notable people with the name include:

== Surname ==
- Charles Piercey (1890–1966), Australian racing cyclist
- Harold Piercey (born 1935), Canadian educator and former politician
- Lisa Piercey (fl. from 2019), American physician
- Robert Piercey (fl. from 2001), Canadian philosopher and professor
- Sheila Piercey Summers (1919–2005), South African tennis player
- William Drysdale Piercey (1877–1964), Canadian politician from Nova Scotia

== Given name ==
- Piercey Dalton (fl. from 2018), Canadian-American actress

== See also ==
- Piercy (disambiguation)
