= Soft story building =

Type of structure

A stilt apartment, a distinct type of soft-story building, in Reading, Berkshire, United Kingdom

A soft-storey building or soft-story building is a multi-story building in which one or more levels have a reduced proportion of floor area dedicated to structural support. The "soft" storeys typically have more windows, wider doors and large unobstructed areas within its floor plan, usually for usage as dedicated commercial real estate such as shopping malls, warehouses, workshops, offices, food courts and cinemas, to house convention facilities such as conference rooms and auditoria, or for use as parking spaces. A typical soft-story building is an apartment building with bottom one or two levels built as a parking garage or a collection of retail businesses with large windows. Another example of such buildings are stilt apartments, whose the entire ground level is a hollow undercroft often used as a multi-vehicle carport, while the main body of the building is held elevated above the foundation with relatively thin and sparsed pillars known as stilts.

The more spacious design of the "soft" storeys leaves fewer structural elements (e.g. columns and bearing walls) remaining to handle structural load, particularly shear walls which would normally be required for stability as a matter of earthquake engineering design. Buildings are classified as having a soft story if that level is less than 70% as stiff as the floor immediately above it, or less than 80% as stiff as the average stiffness of the three floors above it. Such buildings are vulnerable to catastrophic failures in a moderate to severe earthquake in a phenomenon known as soft-story collapse, because the inadequately-braced level is relatively less resistant than surrounding floors to lateral shearing motions during earthquakes, so a disproportionate amount of the building's overall side-to-side drift is focused on that floor. Subject to disproportionate lateral stress, and less able to withstand the stress, the floor becomes a weak point that may suffer structural damage or complete failure, which in turn results in the collapse of the entire building.

== 1989 Loma Prieta earthquake ==
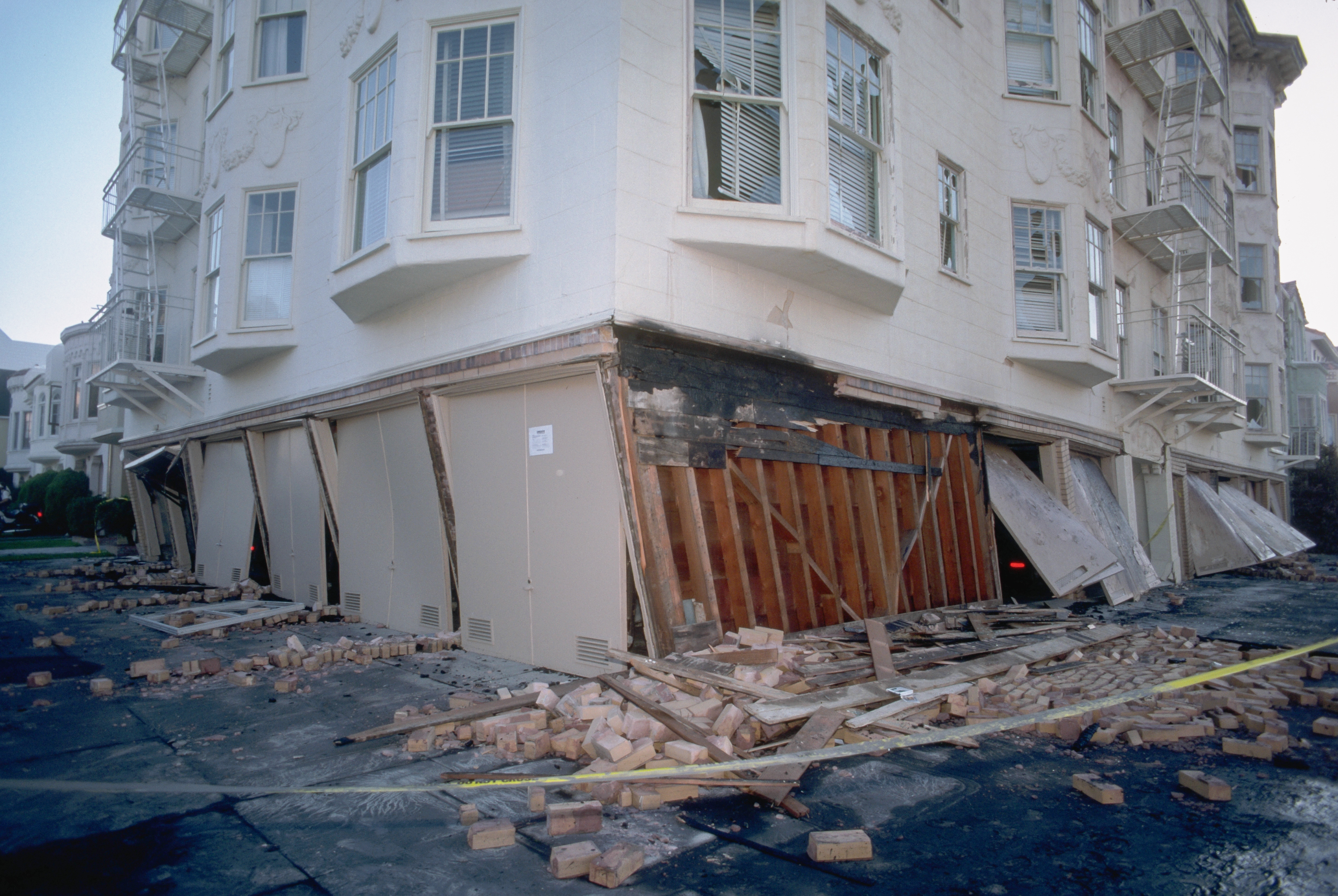
Partial soft-story collapse due to inadequate shear strength at ground level during the Loma Prieta earthquake

Soft-story failure was responsible for nearly half of all homes that became uninhabitable in California's Loma Prieta earthquake of 1989 and was projected to cause severe damage and possible destruction of 160,000 homes in the event of a more significant earthquake in the San Francisco Bay Area. As of 2009, few such buildings in the area had undergone the relatively inexpensive seismic retrofit to correct the condition. In 2013, San Francisco mandated screening of soft-story buildings to determine if retrofitting is necessary, and required that retrofitting be completed by 2017 through 2020.

=== Los Angeles earthquake hazard reduction policies ===
After the establishment of the San Francisco Mandatory Seismic Retrofit Program in 2013, Los Angeles adopted a similar ordinance targeting soft-story apartment buildings. This ordinance is to reduce structural damage in the event of an earthquake by reinforcing soft-story areas with steel structures. A soft-story building is described as existing wood-frame buildings with soft, weak, or open-front walls and existing non-ductile concrete buildings in the ordinance. Most of these buildings were built before 1978, before building codes were changed.

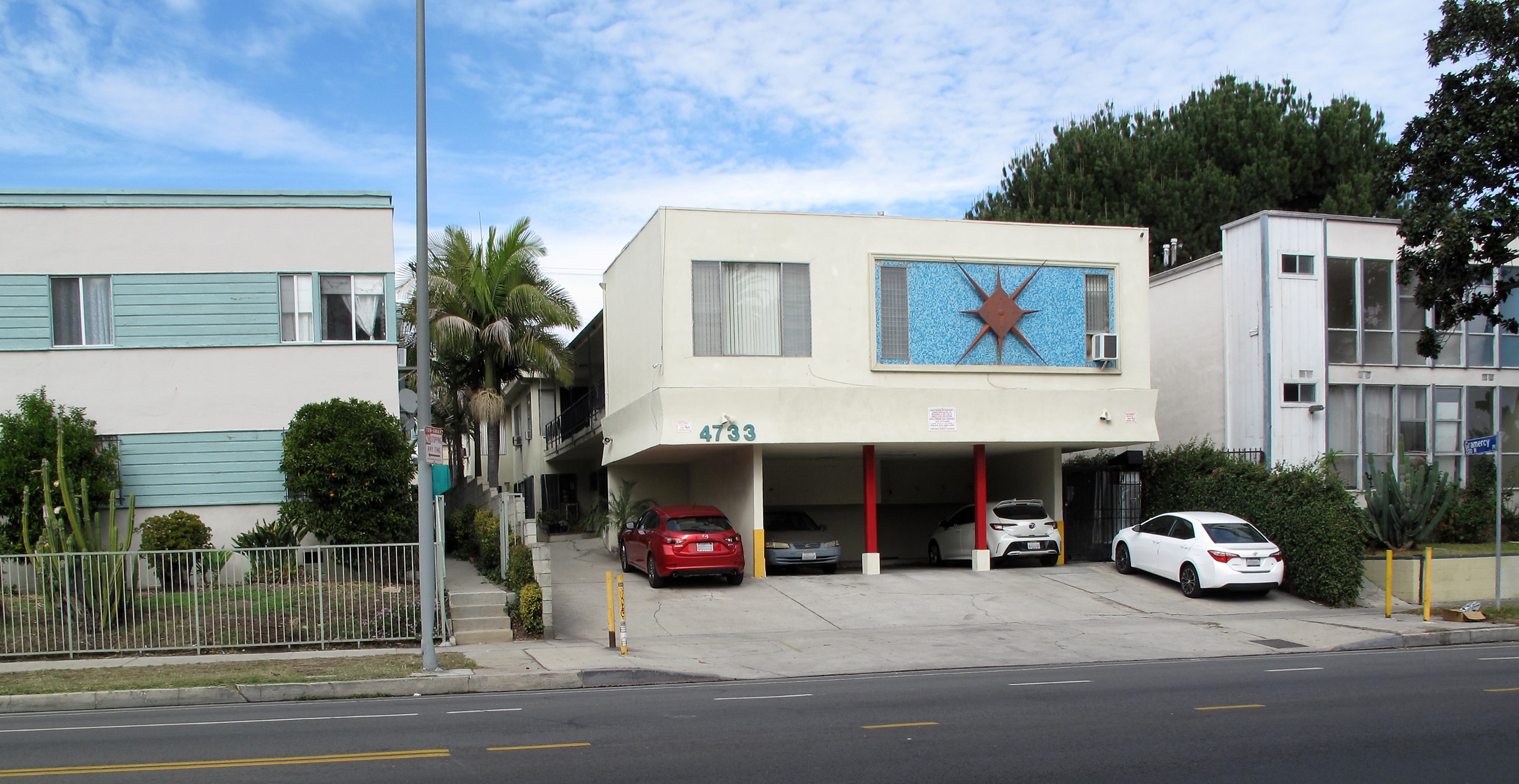
Retrofitted dingbat in Los Angeles with new columns and load-bearing wall, 2021

Los Angeles property owners are being targeted by the size of their buildings. The first group of ordinances went out May 2, 2016, with sixteen or more units and more than three stories. The second is July 22, 2016, with sixteen or more units and two stories. The third is October 17, 2016, with sixteen or fewer units and more than three stories. The fourth is January 30, 2017, for nine to fifteen units. The fifth is May 29, 2017 for seven to eight units. The sixth is August 14, 2017, for four to six units. Then on October 30, 2017 condominiums and commercial buildings will receive their orders to comply.

The order to comply is legally and logistically significant because it starts a timeline. In Los Angeles, property owners have two years from the date of the order to bring forth approved plans. After that milestone, they have 3.5 years (counting from when the order was received) to obtain the construction permit. Total completion, as confirmed by receiving a certificate of compliance, must be attained within seven years of the date of issue of the original order.

Property owners also have the option to demolish their noncompliant buildings. Demolition plans must be submitted within two years, and a demolition permit must be issued within 3.5 years (from the date of the original compliance order), and the actual demolition must be completed within seven years of the original compliance order.

Failure to meet the deadlines can result in the municipality stepping in, evicting any lingering tenants, and then demolishing the building, whereupon the cost of demolition is charged back to the property owner. If the property owner refuses to pay the bill, then the City can seize the entire property and sell it in order to pay for the demolition (including all associated clean-up tasks), as well as any back-taxes that may be owing. However, because land values are often high, it is rare for property owners to neglect orders from the municipality.

== 2023 Turkey–Syria earthquake ==
In Turkey, multi-story residential buildings often have a soft inset ground floor, which is used in high-density areas in Asia to provide extra space for parking or pedestrians. A study in Turkey on 300,000 existing buildings discovered that 78% of the examined buildings had weak or soft-story irregularities. About 90% of buildings that collapsed in the 1999 İzmit earthquake in Turkey had soft stories, which prompted the creation of a building code for earthquake safety. In 2016, Turkish President Recep Tayyip Erdoğan started issuing amnesties to developers for building regulations, allowing the construction of unsafe multi-story buildings, including ones with soft stories. The 2023 Turkey–Syria earthquake destroyed many soft-story buildings, which were widespread in the country and greatly increased the amount of damage and number of casualties.
