= Roger Shiner =

Canadian philosopher

Education
- Education: University of Cambridge (BA, MA, PhD), University of Alberta (MA)
- Thesis: An Analysis of Evaluation (1971)

Philosophical work
- Era: 21st-century philosophy
- Region: Western philosophy
- Institutions: University of British Columbia Okanagan, University of Alberta
- Main interests: philosophy of law, moral philosophy

Roger Shiner is a Canadian philosopher and adjunct professor at the University of British Columbia Okanagan. Shiner is known for his works on philosophy of law. He is a former editor of Philosophy in Review.

== Books ==
- Legal Institutions and the Sources of Law. Volume III of Treatise of Legal Philosophy and General Jurisprudence, 12 volumes. Enrico Pattaro, Gerald J. Postema and Peter Stein, eds. Dordrecht: Springer Verlag 2005. Pp. x + 255. One chapter contributed by A. Rotolo.
- Freedom of Commercial Expression. Oxford: Oxford University Press 2003
- Norm and Nature: The movements of legal thought. Oxford: Clarendon Press 1992
- Knowledge and Reality in Plato's Philebus. Assen: VanGorcum 1974
