= Stephen H. Watson =

American philosopher (born 1951)

- Born: 1951 (age 74–75)

Education
- Education: Duquesne University (PhD)
- Thesis: Language and the Speaking Subject: An Examination of the. Derrida/Searle Exchange (1980)
- Doctoral advisor: Lester Embree

Philosophical work
- Era: 21st-century philosophy
- Region: Western philosophy
- School: Continental
- Institutions: University of Notre Dame
- Doctoral students: Robert Piercey

Stephen H. Watson (born 1951) is an American philosopher and Professor of Philosophy at the University of Notre Dame. He is known for his works on aesthetics, the history of philosophy and recent continental philosophy.

== Books ==
- Crescent Moon over the Rational: Philosophical Interpretations of Paul Klee (Stanford University Press, 2009)
- Traditions I (Indiana University Press, 1997)
- Traditions II (Indiana University Press, 2001)
- Reinterpreting the Political (SUNY Press, 1998)
- In the Shadow of Phenomenology: Writings After Merleau-Ponty I, 2009.
- Phenomenology, Institution and History: Writings After Merleau-Ponty II, 2009.
- Ipseity and Alterity: Interdisciplinary Approaches to Intersubjectivity, coed. 2004.
- Extensions: Essays on Interpretation, Rationality and the Closure of Modernism, 1992.
