= Lester Embree =

American philosopher

- Born: 1938
- Died: 2017 (aged 78–79)

Philosophical work
- Era: 21st-century philosophy
- Region: Western philosophy
- School: Continental
- Doctoral students: Stephen H. Watson

Lester Embree (1938–2017) was an American philosopher and Professor of Philosophy at Florida Atlantic University who worked in the phenomenological tradition.
