= Philosophy in Review =

- Discipline: Philosophy
- Language: English
- Edited by: Joel Hubick

Publication details
- History: 1981–present
- Publisher: University of Victoria (Canada)
- Frequency: Bimonthly
- Open access: yes

Standard abbreviations
- ISO 4: Philos. Rev. (Vic.)

Indexing
- ISSN: 1920-8936

Links
- Journal homepage; University of Victoria Journal Publishing Service

Philosophy in Review, formerly Canadian Philosophical Reviews, is an English-language online open access journal, that specializes in the review of books about philosophy. It is published six times a year and covers all areas of and approaches to philosophy.

== History ==
It started as a publication of Academic Printing and Publishing in 1981 by its first editor and publisher, Roger Shiner, and changed its name 1997. In 2006 editorship of Philosophy in Review passed to Jeffrey Foss of the University of Victoria, in British Columbia, Canada, who was succeeded in 2007 by David Scott, also of the University of Victoria. In 2010 the University of Victoria replaced Academic Printing and Publishing as the publisher of Philosophy in Review. The formal association of Philosophy in Review with the Philosophy Department at the University of Victoria ended when Taneli Kukkonen, then of the University of Otago, became editor. He was succeeded by Neil Levy of the University of Melbourne and Robert Piercey of the University of Regina.

Issues back to Volume 1, Number 1 (1981) are accessible online and can be searched by issue, author of review, and title or author of the book.

== Abstracting and indexing ==
The journal is abstracted and indexed in:

- Érudit
- Philosopher's Index with Full Text (EBSCO)
- International Directory of Philosophy (PDC)
- The Philosophy Paperboy
- Ulrichs Web

== Editorial board ==
- Joel Hubick (Editor)
- Inba Kehoe (Managing Editor)

=== Associate editors ===
- Margaret Cameron, University of Victoria
- Benjamin W. McCraw, University of South Carolina Upstate, United States
- Shane Jesse Ralston, Penn State Hazleton, United States
- James Young, University of Victoria, Canada

=== Former editors ===
- David Scott, University of Victoria
- Taneli Kukkonen
- Neil Levy, The Florey Institute of Neuroscience and Mental Health, University of Melbourne
- Jeffrey Foss, Philosophy, University of Victoria, Canada
- Roger Shiner
- Robert Piercey
