= Dingbat (building) =

Apartment type in the US's Sun Belt

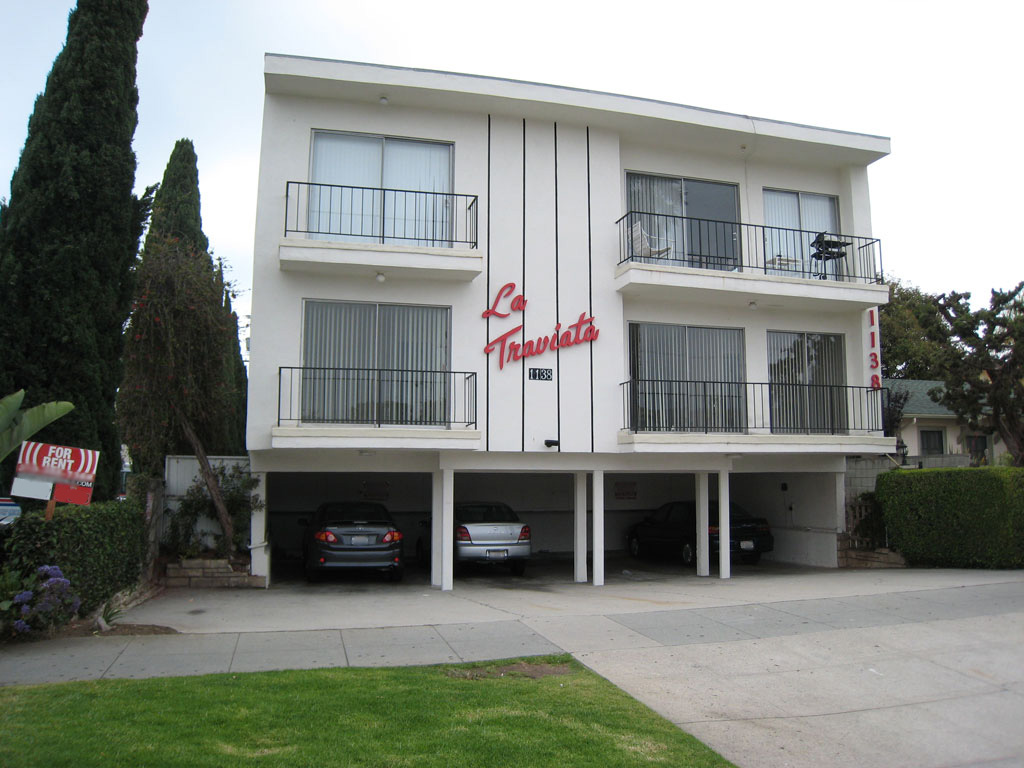
A dingbat apartment building in Southern California (Santa Monica)

A dingbat is a type of apartment building, named for the midcentury-esque visual motifs on their exterior, that flourished in the Sun Belt region of the United States in the 1950s and 1960s, a vernacular variation of shoebox style "stucco boxes". Dingbats are boxy, two or three-story apartment houses with overhangs sheltering street-front parking. They remain widely in use today as “bastions of affordable shelter.” The dingbat, like the bungalow court, was a "popular and populist form of housing."

By converting single-family lots into multi-family homes, single-family dwellings could now house multiple households and still provide parking space.

Mainly found in Southern California, but also in Arizona, Florida, Hawaii, Nevada, and Vancouver, Canada, dingbats vary in cost from inexpensive to high-end. Some replaced more distinctive but less profitable building structures, such as single-family Victorian homes. Since the 1950s they have been the subject of aesthetic interest as examples of Mid-Century modern design and kitsch, since many dingbats have themed names and specialized trim.

From a structural engineering perspective, the "tuck-under parking" arrangement may create a soft story if the residential levels are supported on slender columns without many shear walls in the parking level. Soft story buildings can collapse during an earthquake.

== Name ==
The first textual reference to the term "dingbat" was made by Reyner Banham in Los Angeles: The Architecture of Four Ecologies (1971). He credits the coining to architect Francis Ventre and describes them:

...[Dingbats] are normally a two-story walk-up apartment-block developed back over the full depth of the site, built of wood and stuccoed over. These are the materials that Rudolf Schindler and others used to build the first modern architecture in Los Angeles, and the dingbat, left to its own devices, often exhibits the basic characteristics of a primitive modern architecture. Round the back, away from the public gaze, they display simple rectangular forms and flush smooth surfaces, skinny steel columns and simple boxed balconies, and extensive overhangs to shelter four or five cars...

While the word is sometimes said to reference dingbat in the sense of a "general term of disparagement", dingbat refers to the stylistic star-shaped decorations, reminiscent of typographic dingbats, that often garnish the stucco façades. These flourishes and other ornamental elements reflect the contemporary but more complex Googie architecture.

== History ==
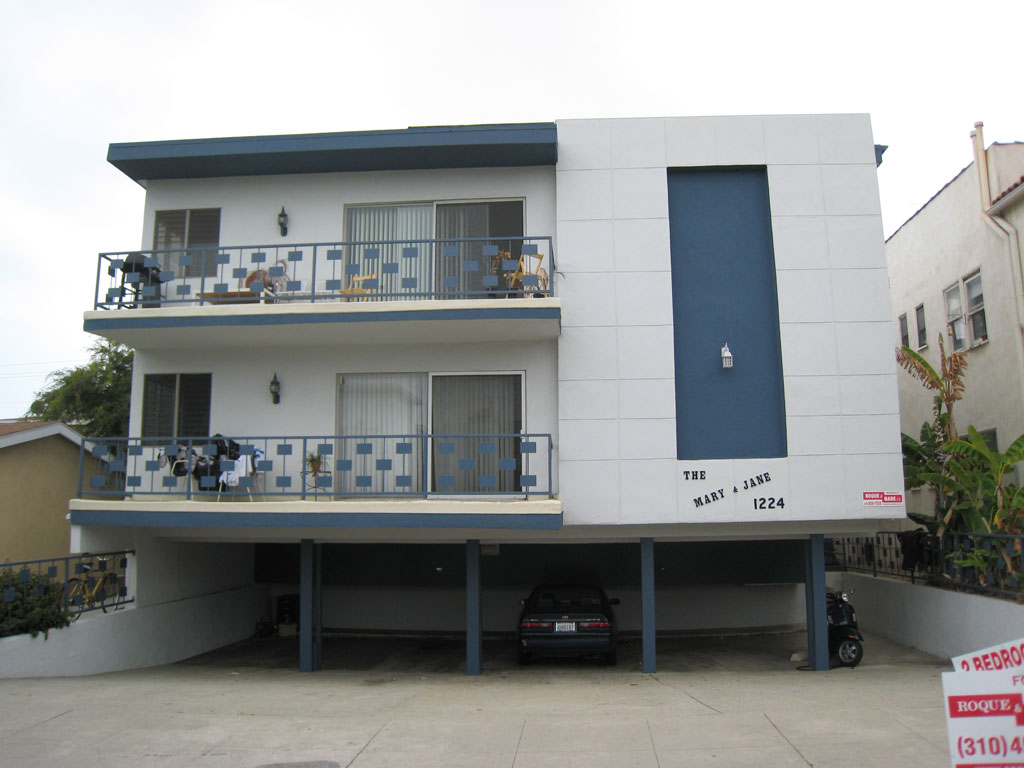
Dingbat building named "The Mary & Jane" with styled balconies

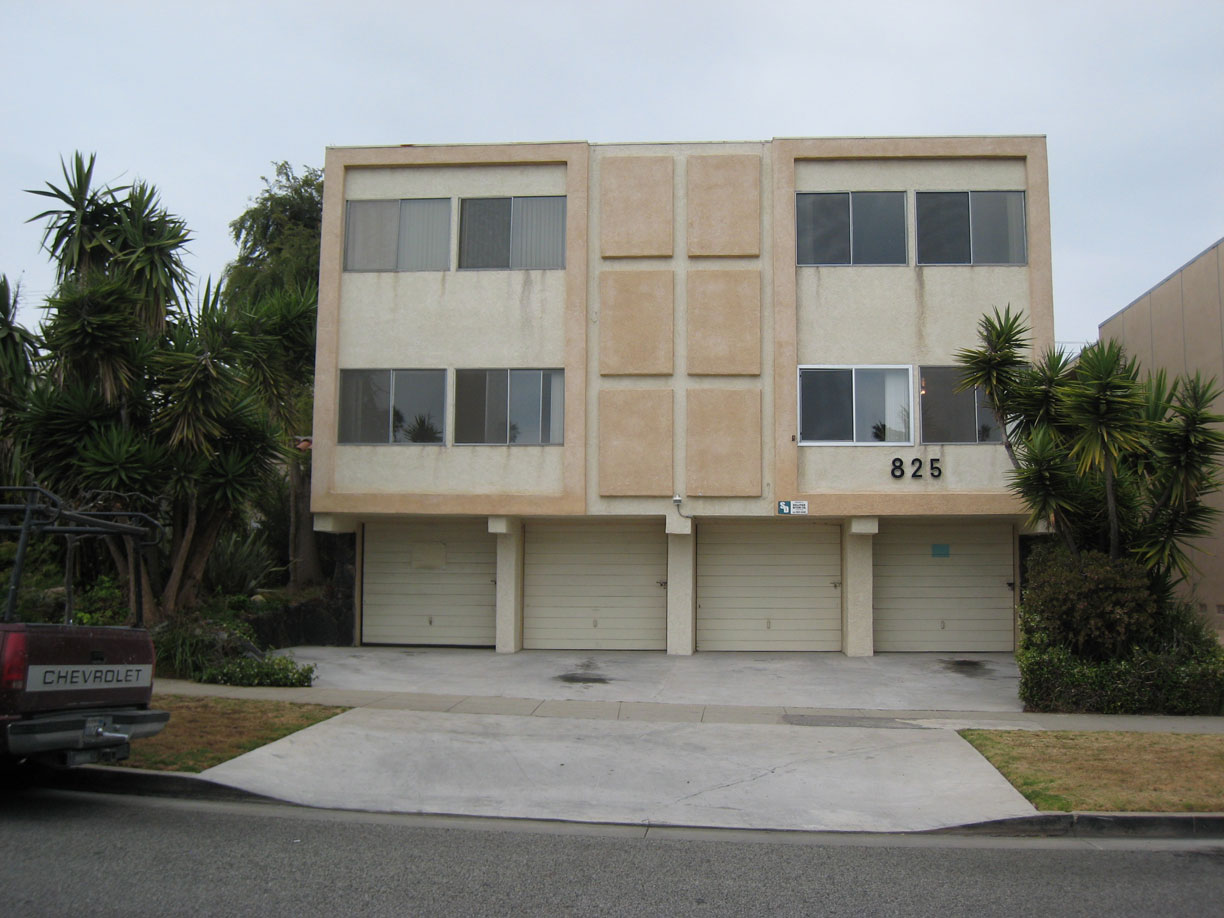
A stucco box

In a 1998 Los Angeles Times editorial about the area's evolving standards for development, the birth of the dingbat is retold (as a cautionary tale): "By mid-century, a development-driven southern California was in full stride, paving its bean fields, leveling mountaintops, draining waterways and filling in wetlands...In our rush to build we tolerated monumentally careless and unattractive urban design...Some of it [was] awful—start with the 'dingbat' apartment house, a boxy two-story walk-up with sheltered parking at street level and not one inch of outdoor space."

Geographer Barbara Rubin writes that since the existing housing stock of California bungalows, Mediterranean-style small houses, Spanish Colonial Revival duplexes and aging Victorians was insufficient, "a compromise capable of accommodating a marked increase in density, yet human in scale, and economical to construct, evolved by the early 1950s." This was the dingbat. Dingbats are generally designed to be built on a single, standard residential lot, and use the same types of materials and construction techniques as single-family house construction. Because of this a dingbat is generally comparable in construction cost to a large 2-story house, with none of the expensive features required in larger apartment buildings such as elevators, fire suppression systems, and multistory parking garages.

Dingbats were appealing to the three important factors of the real estate business—builders, landlords and renters:

- Developers used the cookie-cutter, straight-line approach to building because simplicity and repetition held down costs, allowed economies of scale and required much less skilled labor than would curvier or more creative buildings. The modest scale of the individual buildings reduced the need for costly, specialized building techniques required in taller structures. This allowed them to be constructed of wood by contractors and laborers who were accustomed to building large suburban houses.
- Land owners profited if they invested in the new apartment style and replaced one or two streams of rental income with triple or quadruple the number of units.
- Since each unit typically had a private entrance, stucco boxes offered an affordable version of the American Dream to city dwellers who aspired to owning a detached, single-family home, and with on-site parking, dingbats participated in the car culture of postwar American life.

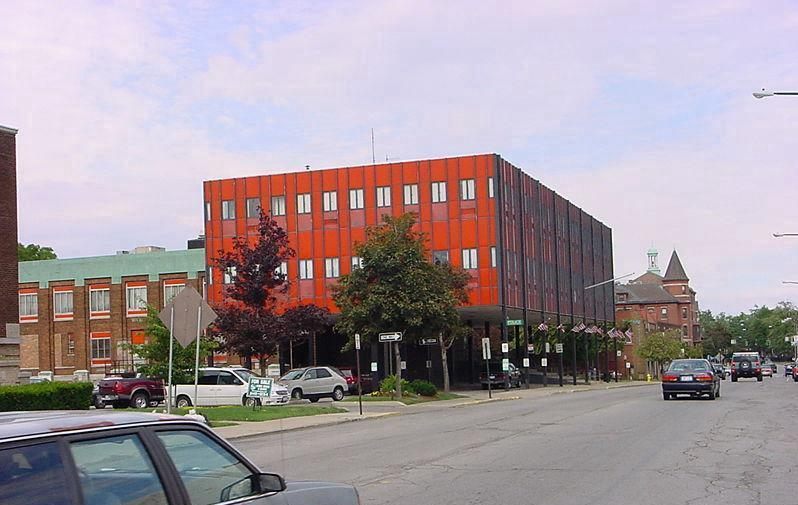
Lackawanna City Hall

Rubin continues, "Inserted into empty lots or replacing the [existing] residential stock, the dingbat [was] a remarkably successfully transitional solution, the fulminations of architectural critics notwithstanding." Dingbats are primarily located in areas of a city that were (sub)urbanized or redeveloped in the 1950s and 1960s; city centers are generally free of them. Many are located on cheaper lots found near "locally undesirable land uses" such as sewage plants, power stations, jails or major freeways. Their low cost and mass production created a huge supply of cheap housing in areas where they were concentrated. They were in this regard highly successful in the goal of easing the region's shortage of rental housing. However, the influx of low-income renters was often blamed for problems of poverty and gang violence in these areas. As housing costs have risen in subsequent decades, many of the buildings have been renovated and now command high rents.

The production of dingbats essentially ceased by the mid-1970s because they were "zoned out of existence when their signature back-out parking was banned by city ordinance".

An unusual nonresidential use of the dingbat style can be seen in the Lackawanna, New York, City Hall.

== Architecture, construction and styling ==
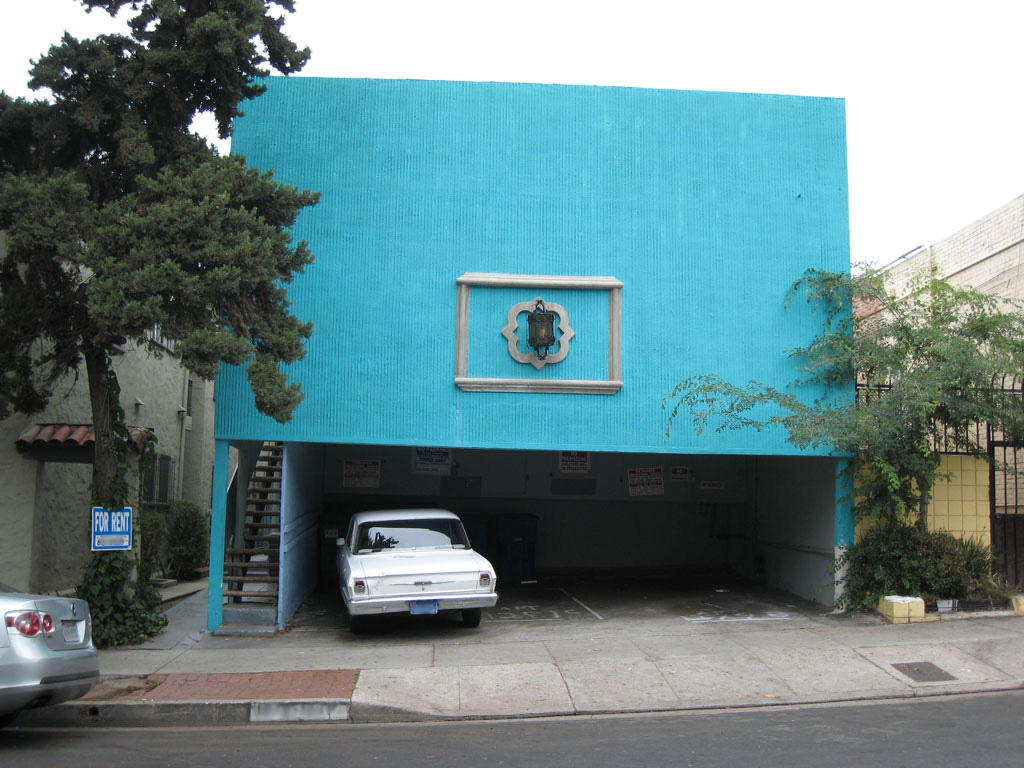
Rectangular building fitted to its lot, with a decorative element

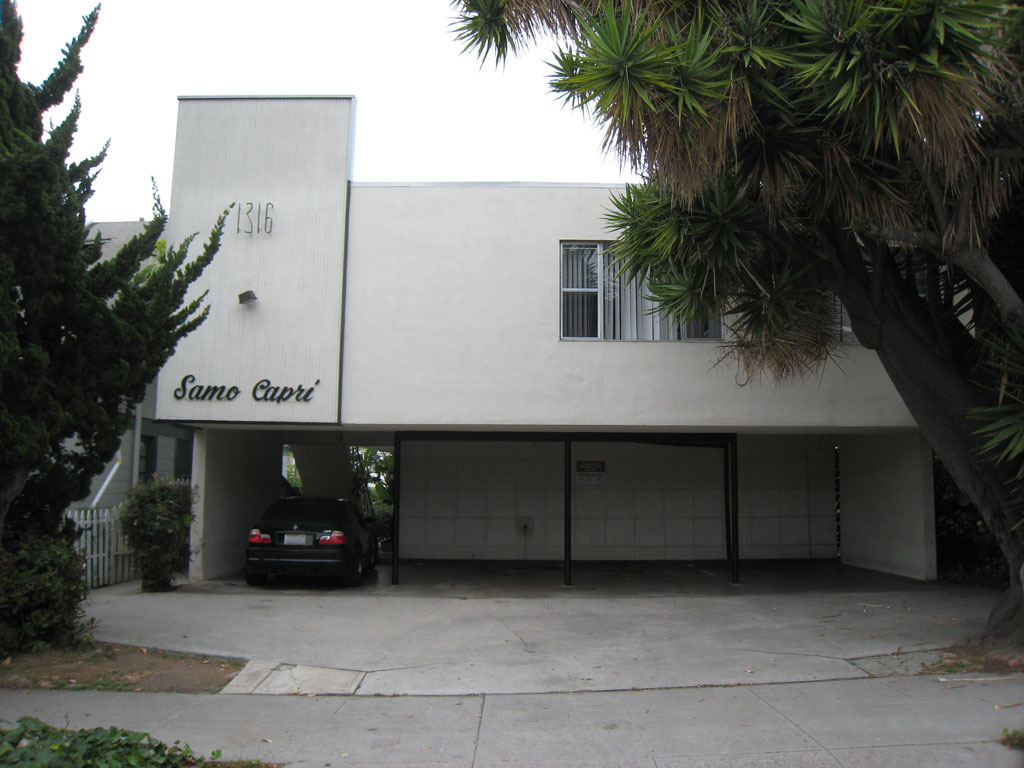
No entrances visible from the street

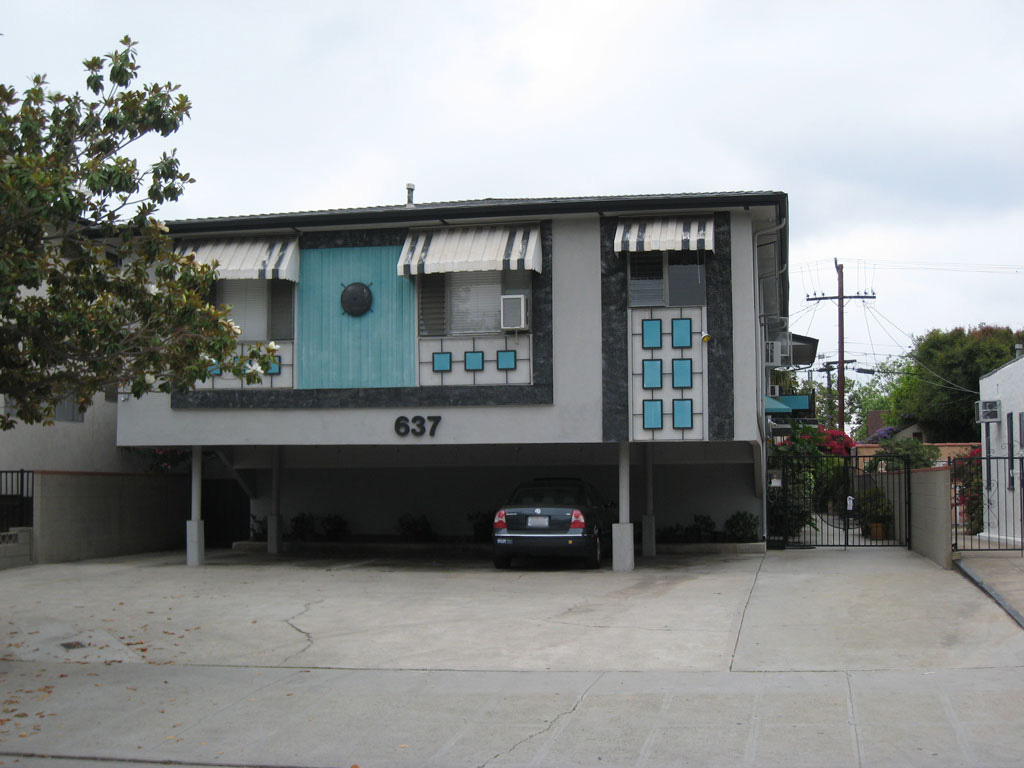
Example of multiple types of ornamentation on one building

Dingbats, designed to maximize land use, stretch their footprints to the lot line and are typically 50 feet (15 m) wide by 100 feet (30 m) deep. Always cuboid, the stucco boxes usually contain six to twelve apartments per building. Most dingbats are covered in stucco, sometimes along with other materials like vertical wooden clapboard, concrete blocks or river rock. The stilts that support the cantilevered portion of the building are generally made of metal or stucco-covered wood.

Two standard elements of the dingbat type are multiple entrances and the illusion of single-family residential density. The front of the building usually has one entrance or no entrances, presenting a unified front to the street. Typically, each unit is assigned a reserved parking spot; in some cases it is tandem parking. Some dingbats have studios; most are filled with one-or-two bedroom, one-bathroom units.

As for their livability, Gary Indiana writes, "A bad idea run amok, these one- or two- (sometimes three-) story stucco shoeboxes that nearly everyone lives in at one time or another in L.A. have an existential emptiness that can be gussied up and dissembled by track lighting and the right sort of throw pillows and furniture, but the spatial insipidity of the dingbat eventually defeats most efforts to turn a 'unit' into 'home,' even when little sparkle lights enliven the façade." Unit interiors are defined by minimalism, typically consisting of bare rectangular rooms with simple windows, little to no built-in interior detail, and only the most basic fixtures. This makes their appeal highly dependent upon the furnishings and decorations brought by the residents.

The external ornamentation holds most of the aesthetic appeal that is to be found in a stucco box. Their dingbats, if detached, are collected by fans of the Space Age, Tiki and mid-century American design in general.

Critic Mimi Zeiger said, "[Stucco boxes] wear their accessories—star-shaped wrought iron, carriage lamps, decorative tile, coats-of-arms—like clip-on jewelry. Baubles and brooches designed to emulate a glamour just beyond reach." (Other popular decorations include electric-light torches, stylized animals and geometric designs that evoke Piet Mondrian's art.)

Dingbats often have a name applied to the face of the building in cursive writing. Some used the name of the street (The Redondo sat on Redondo Avenue, etc.) and others referenced fantasy lifestyles and geographies: tropical paradises (the Caribbean, the Riviera, Hawaii) or stately dwellings of rarefied provenance (villas, castles).

A Los Angeles Times reporter writing about a book devoted to the rediscovery of the dingbat noted, "Grandiose names—manors, arms, chezs, chateaus—abound. 'How charming is that?' [dingbat fan] Piercy asks, flipping to a big, numb box with Byron Arms printed above the doorway. 'Nobody in their right mind would think that Lord Byron lived there. It's lovely!'"

Artists have recently produced series of dingbat photographs, some connecting images of their uniformity to the replicative pop art of Andy Warhol and finding that "the little differences between a monstrosity called the Capri and a twin called the Flamingo acquire the cachet of something like concepts." Others see a recognition of "individual dignity and communal worth" within the varied but conventional structures.

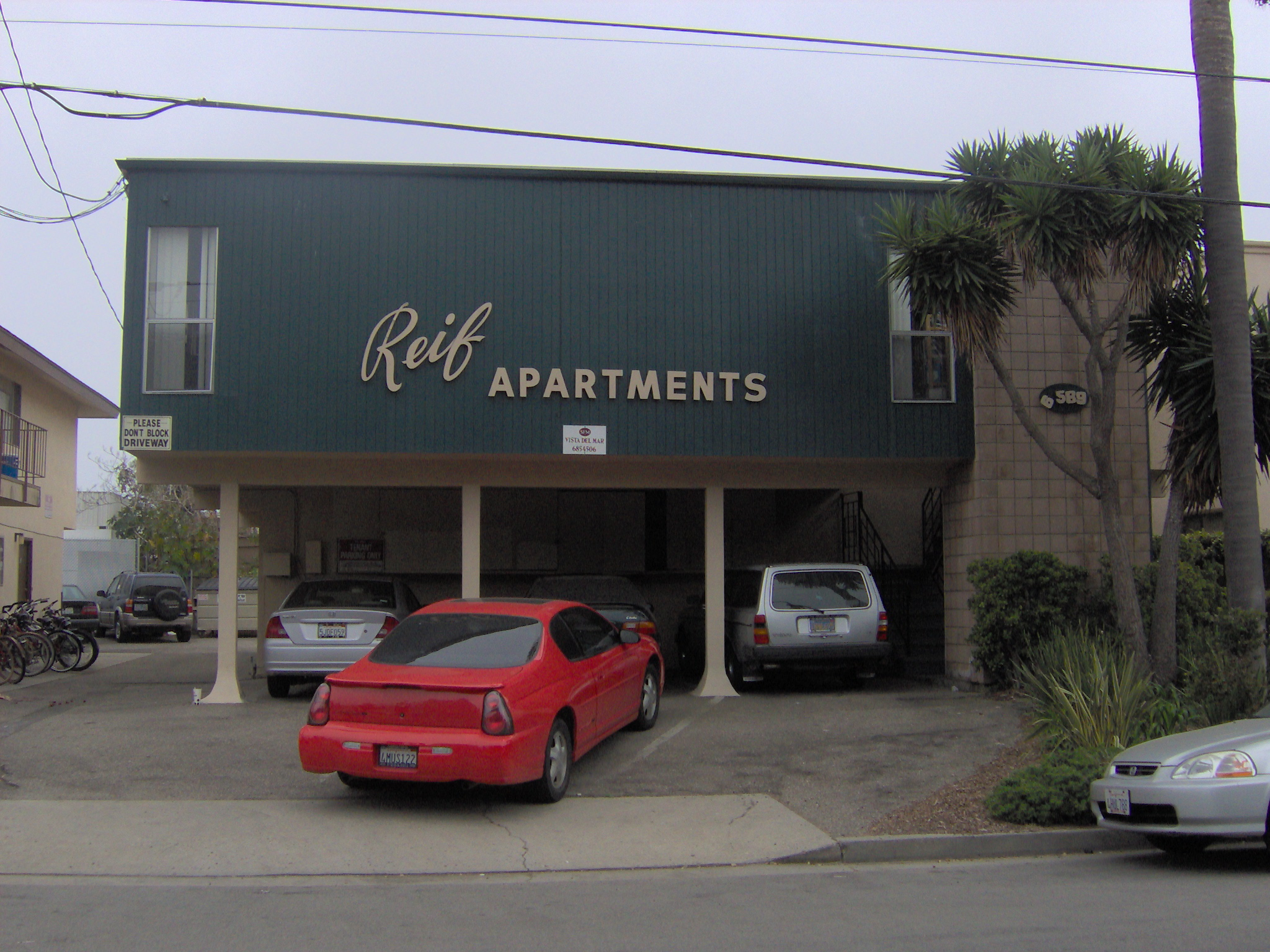
A dingbat building

== Demolition and preservation efforts ==
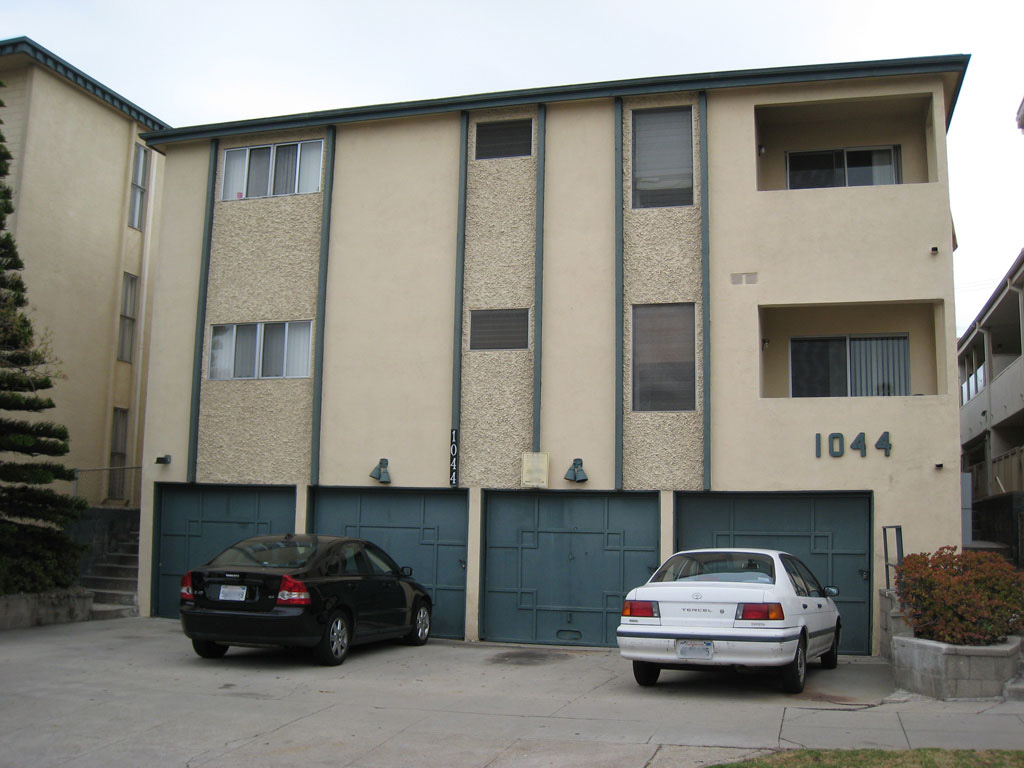
A dingbat building

Their bare architecture and boxy appearance mean that dingbats are considered an eyesore and a demolition target in many towns. A city plan for Sarasota, Florida, adopted in 2000 included a gallery of buildings found in the city, with only the dingbat being pointed out as an "undesirable" building type. Similarly, in 1999, the northern California city of El Cerrito published a master plan in which "Older 'stucco box' apartment buildings will be replaced with more up-to-date and better quality apartments and condominiums." Dingbats are decried by many urban planners due to their relatively lower densities and large parking areas, which reduces the attractiveness and usefulness of street-level pedestrian space. Some dingbats move the parking into the rear or side of the building, and use the front for a more welcoming pedestrian entrance.

One design magazine states that, "The construction of one dingbat on a street of elegant rowhouses is enough to send property values plummeting," and subsequently calls for more form-based codes, a type of building-design ordinance that distinguishes between the aesthetic (and therefore socio-economic) value of dingbats and rowhouses. However, the tendency of dingbats to lower property values in an area can be highly beneficial to working-class renters who would otherwise be unable to afford housing in the area. The widespread construction of dingbats across Southern California in the 1950s and 1960s, along with the accompanying decrease in property values, was a major catalyst for the subsequent backlash by NIMBY groups which greatly restricted multi-family construction throughout the region.

In 2016, authors Thurman Grant and Joshua G. Stein, in conjunction with the Los Angeles Forum for Architecture and Urban Design, published the book Dingbat 2.0: The Iconic Los Angeles Apartment as Projection of a Metropolis that details the historical, sociological, and architectural importance of the dingbats in Los Angeles. Grant argues that the dingbat “can be considered an icon of the 20th century, in all its kitschy glory", and that demolishing the buildings would remove an essential part of Los Angeles history.

Because they were predominantly constructed before 1973, most dingbat apartments in the City of Los Angeles are subject to the local rent control ordinance. It is common for long-term tenants in these buildings to pay significantly below market rent, making them an important supply of affordable housing for lower-income renters, particularly in areas which have seen rapid increases in rents in recent years.

== Seismic vulnerability ==
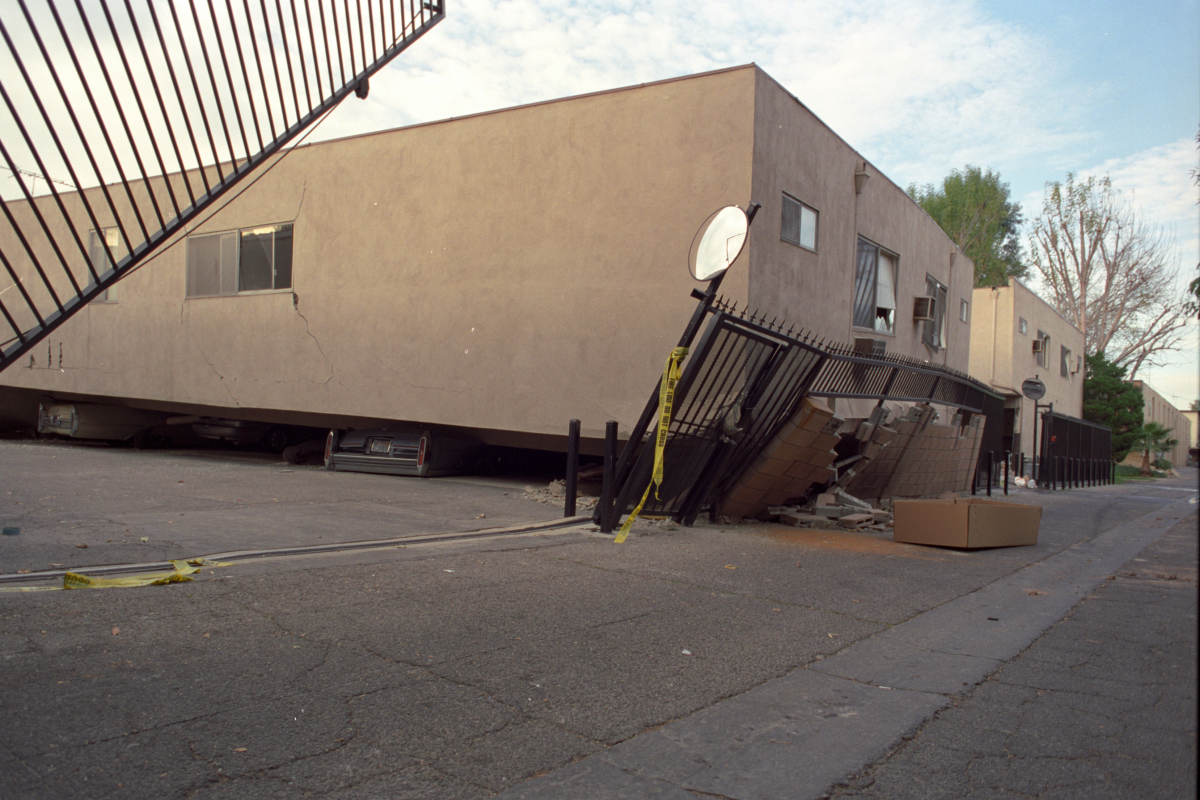
A collapsed dingbat-style building after the 1994 Northridge earthquake

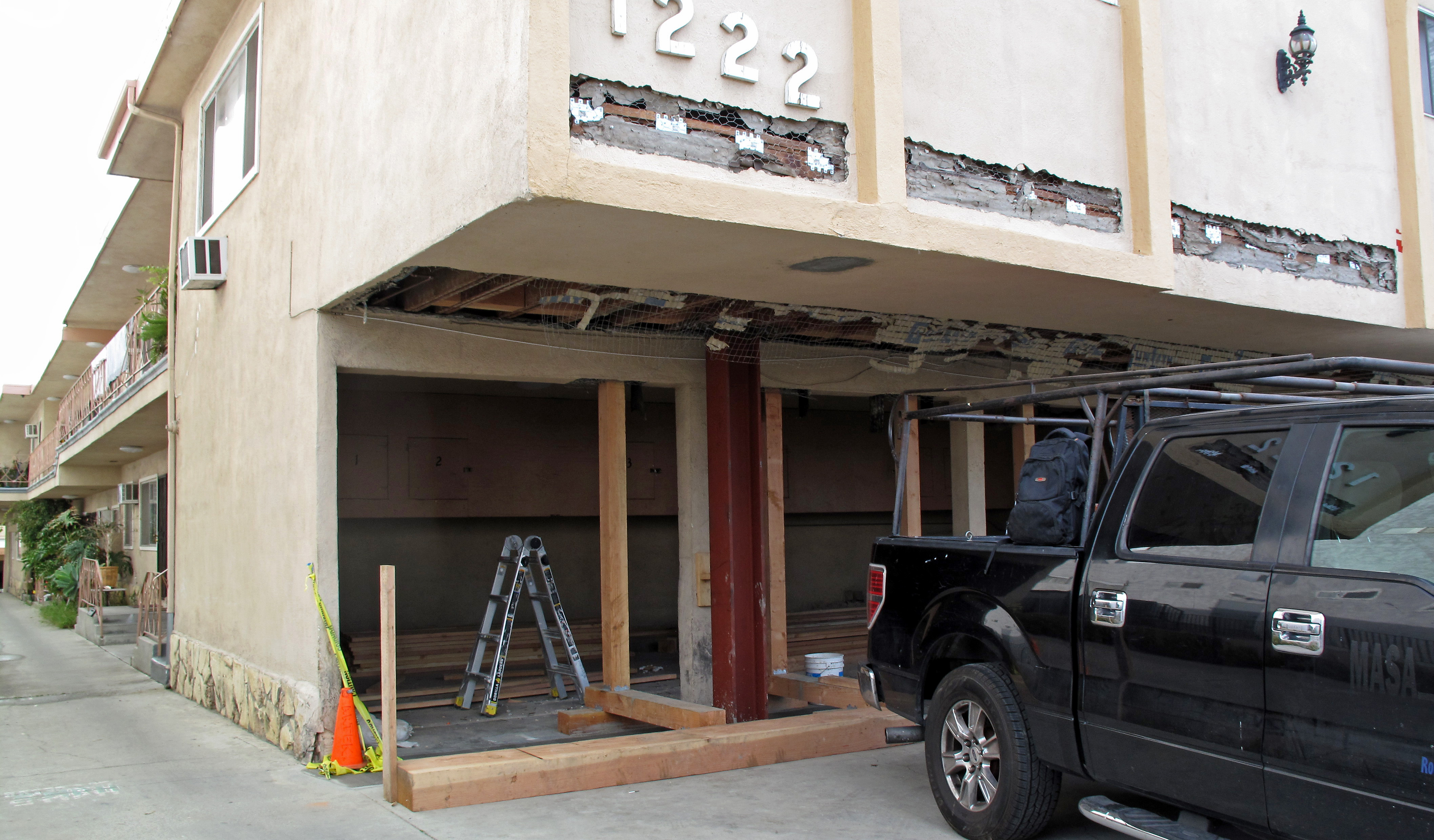
Soft story retrofit of dingbat building, Los Angeles, California

The columns used to hold up dingbat-style and soft-story buildings have been identified as vulnerable to collapse during earthquakes. During the 1994 Northridge earthquake in Los Angeles, 200 soft-story residential buildings collapsed. The solution to this vulnerability is to reinforce the overhanging sections with stronger support materials, such as steel I-beams or thick wooden columns. Many cities, including Los Angeles, have required owners of soft-story buildings to retrofit them with additional reinforcement.

== In popular culture ==
Photographer Lesley Marlene Siegel has been documenting the Southern California dingbat in photos since the 1990s. Her catalog now comprises over 2,300 images and culminated in a 2003 solo show called "Apartment Living Is Great". Another Los Angeles artist, Clive Piercy, published a 480-image photography book the same year, entitled Pretty Vacant: The Los Angeles Dingbat Observed.

In the 1998 film The Slums of Beverly Hills, teenager Viv (Natasha Lyonne) laments that her family is constantly moving from one dingbat to another. "Casa Bella", she says, surveying the stucco facade of a building the family is moving into, "another dingbat. Dingbats—that's what they're called. Two-story apartment buildings featuring cheap rents and fancy names that promise the good life, but never deliver."

== Gallery ==
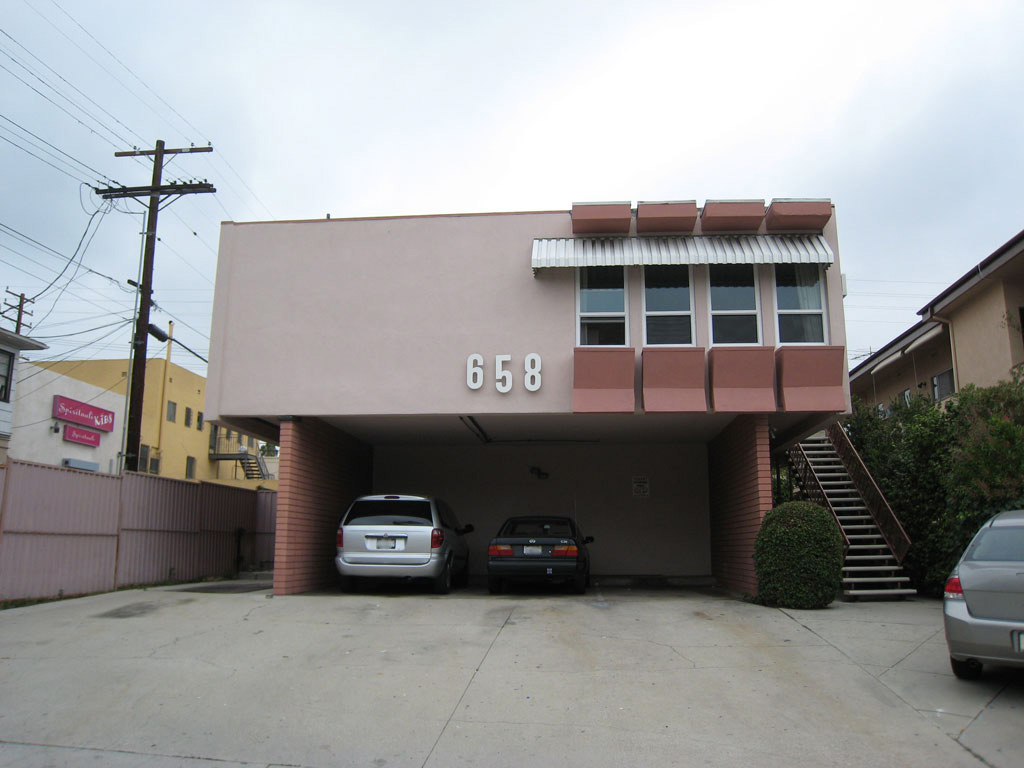

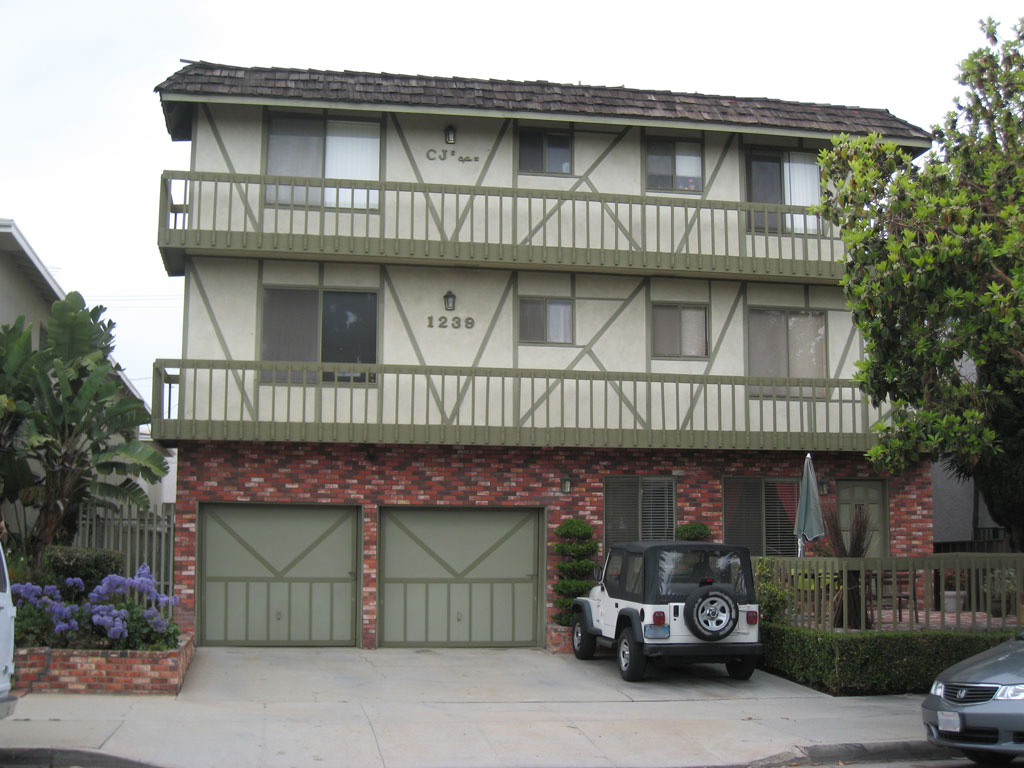

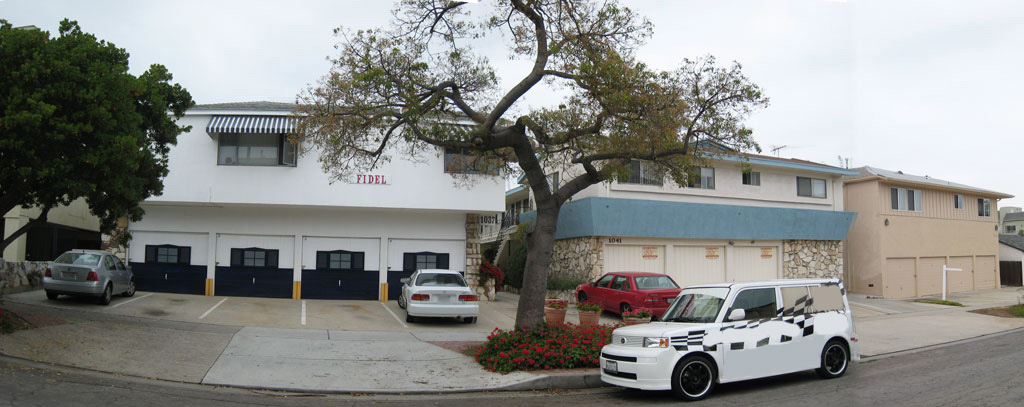

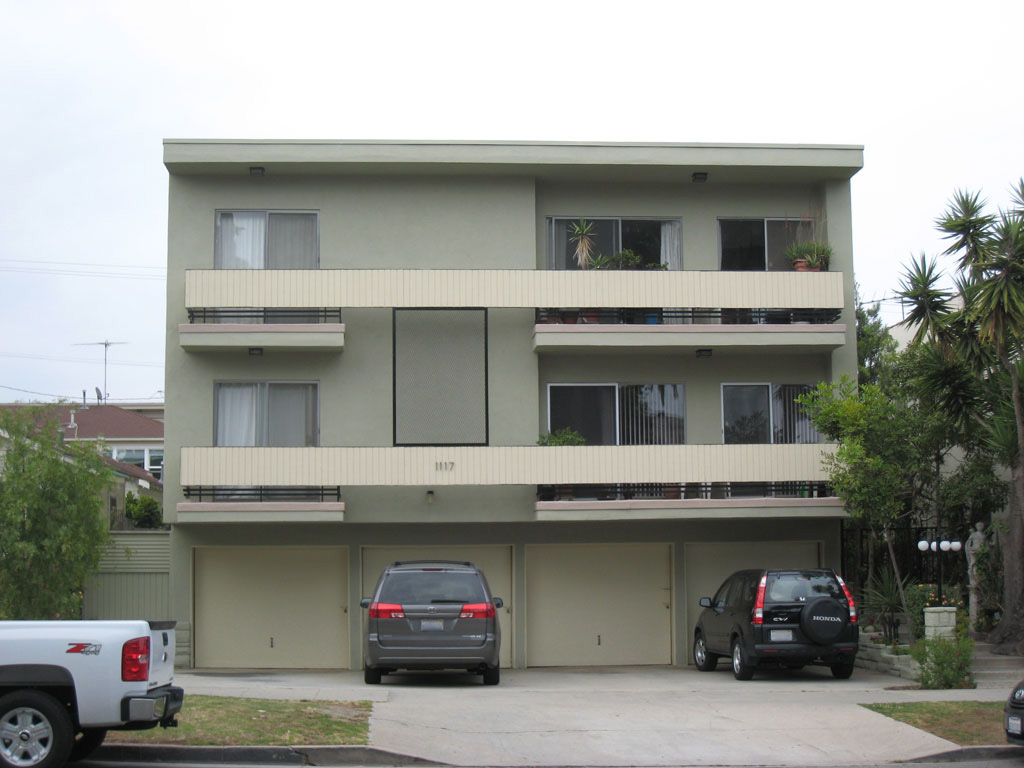

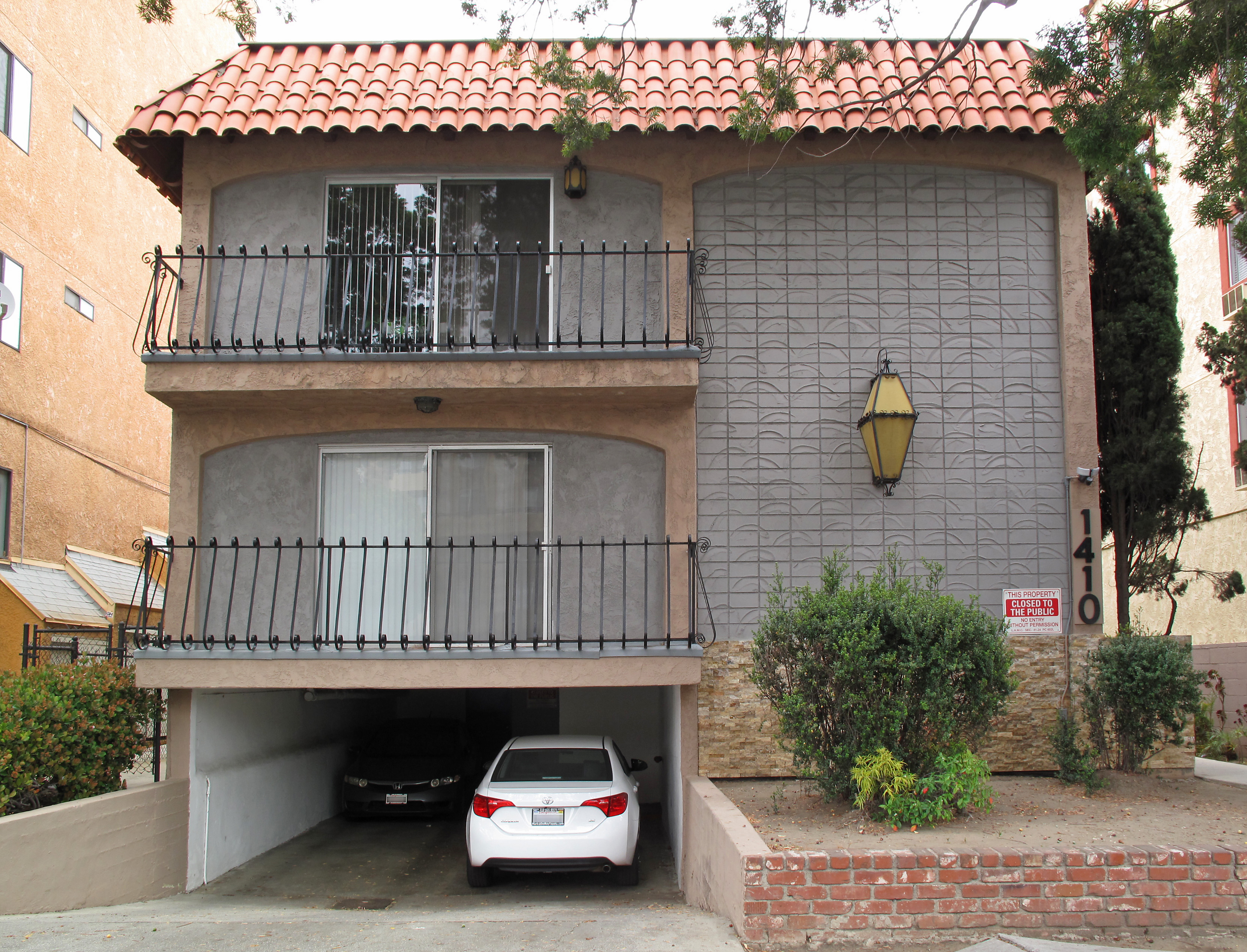

== See also ==
- International style (architecture)
- Villa Savoye
- Vancouver special

== Additional sources ==
Books

- Piercy, Clive (2003). Pretty Vacant: The Los Angeles Dingbat Observed. San Francisco: Chronicle Books. ISBN 0-8118-4024-7.
- Siegel, Lesley Marlene (2003). Apartment Living Is Great. Melbourne, Australia: Outré Gallery Press.
- Grant, Thurman, and Joshua G. Stein, Editors (2016). Dingbat 2.0: The Iconic Los Angeles Apartment as Projection of a Metropolis. Los Angeles: DoppelHouse Press.

Web

- Frost, Garrison, Dingbat Living, The Aesthetic, date unknown, last modified April 2, 2005 (Accessed December 28, 2005).
- Noll, Udo, Peter Scupelli and gruppo A12, parole dynamic dictionary: dingbat, date unknown (Accessed December 28, 2005).
- Office of Historic Resources, City of Los Angeles, Dingbats, Preservation Plan Workbook, June 12, 2003 (Accessed September 7, 2009).
- Silver, Daisy, 'Some Los Angeles Dingbats', Dispatches, July 18, 2022 (Accessed August 28, 2024).
