= William Piercy, 1st Baron Piercy =

British economist and businessman (1886–1966)

The Right Honourable The Lord Piercy CBE
- Piercy in 1945, by Walter Stoneman

President of the Royal Statistical Society
- In office 1954–1955
- Preceded by: Sir Ronald Fisher
- Succeeded by: Egon Pearson

Personal details
- Born: 7 February 1886
- Died: 7 July 1966 (aged 80)
- Spouse(s): Mary Pelham (m. 1915 d. 1953); Veronica Warham (m. 1964)
- Children: 4
- Education: London School of Economics

William Piercy, 1st Baron Piercy CBE (7 February 1886 – 7 July 1966) was a British economist, civil servant, businessman and financier. He is best remembered as chairman of the Industrial & Commercial Finance Corporation from 1945 to 1964.

== Early life ==
Piercy was the only son of Edward Piercy, of Hoxton, Middlesex, and his second wife Mary Ann Margaret (née Heaford). His father was killed in an industrial accident in 1893. Piercy was educated locally, but left school at the age of twelve to join Pharaoh Gane, timber brokers, as an office boy. He studied at night and in 1910, aged 24, he became a full-time undergraduate student at the London School of Economics. He graduated B.Sc. in 1914 and was for a time a lecturer in history and public administration at the school.

== Career ==
During the First World War Piercy worked for the Inland Revenue, was a member of the Allied Provisions Export Commission and a director of the Ministry of Food. For his services he was made a CBE in 1919. After the war he became trading general manager of Harrisons & Crosfield Ltd and joint managing director of Pharaoh Gane, and in the early 1930s he was one of the organisers of the first unit trusts. Between 1934 and 1942 he was a member of the London Stock Exchange. During the Second World War he rendered the government great service, notably as head of the British Petroleum Mission in Washington D.C., as principal assistant secretary in the Ministry of Supply and the Ministry of Aircraft Production and as personal assistant to the Deputy Prime Minister Clement Attlee. On 14 November 1945 he was raised to the peerage as Baron Piercy, of Burford in the County of Oxford.

From 1945 to 1964 Piercy served as chairman of the Industrial & Commercial Finance Corporation, which was set up to provide means to smaller businesses in the United Kingdom. He was also a director of the Bank of England from 1946 to 1956 and chairman of the Wellcome Trust from 1960 to 1965. He also served as President of the Royal Statistical Society from 1954 to 1955. He was a governor of The Peckham Experiment in 1949.

== Family ==
Lord Piercy married, firstly, Mary Louisa, daughter of Thomas Henry William Pelham, in 1915. They had one son and three daughters. After his first wife's death in 1953, he married, secondly, Veronica, daughter of Mrs Ann Warham, in 1964. He died in July 1966, aged 80, and was succeeded in the barony by his only son Nicholas.

== Arms ==
Coat of arms of William Piercy, 1st Baron Piercy
Crest Issuant from a bezant in front of two spears in saltire points upwards Proper a demi-lion guardant Sable charged on the shoulder with a pierced mullet Argent. Escutcheon Per fess indented Gules and Argent in chief three pierced mullets Argent in base a lion rampant guardant Sable. Motto Spes In Deo Orders Order of the British Empire

Peerage of the United Kingdom
New creation	Baron Piercy; 1945–1966	Succeeded by Nicholas Pelham Piercy
