= Baron Piercy =

Barony in the Peerage of the United Kingdom

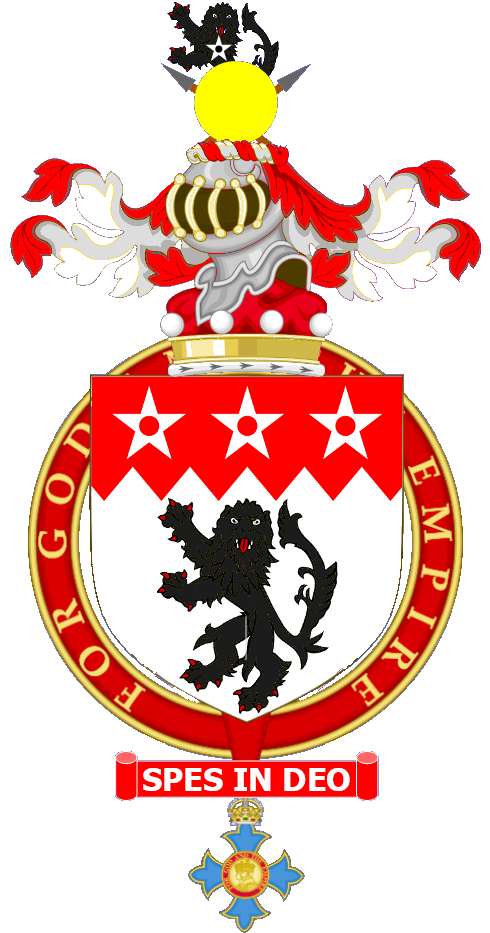
Arms of the first baron

Baron Piercy, of Burford in the County of Oxford, is a title in the Peerage of the United Kingdom. It was created on 14 November 1945 for the economist, financier and civil servant William Piercy. As of 2010 the title is held by his grandson, the third Baron, who succeeded his father in 1981.

== Barons Piercy (1945) ==
- William Piercy, 1st Baron Piercy (1886–1966)
- Nicholas Pelham Piercy, 2nd Baron Piercy (1918–1981)
- James William Piercy, 3rd Baron Piercy (b. 1946)

The heir presumptive is the present holder's brother Hon. Mark Edward Pelham Piercy (b. 1953).
The heir presumptive's heir apparent, and last in line, is his son William Nicholas Pelham Piercy (b. 1989).
