= Clive Piercy =

British-American designer, author, and design educator (1955–2017)

- Born: May 29, 1955; Cheltenham, England, United Kingdom
- Died: August 20, 2017 (aged 62); Santa Monica, California, USA
- Education: Brighton School of Art and Technology
- Occupations: Graphic Designer, Author, Design Educator
- Spouse: Ann Field (m. 1979)
- Awards: AIGA Fellow, 2009

Clive Piercy (May 29, 1955 – August 20, 2017) was a British-American designer, author, and design educator, active for four decades in London and Los Angeles. He was noted for his use of typography, his color sense, his visual wit, and for bringing a British sensibility to the California aesthetic.

American designer Paula Scher noted Piercy's “keen vision, especially about L.A. I think it may have taken a British ex-pat to have such clear eyes about the left coast. He taught me to see Los Angeles.”

Piercy won multiple design awards, and was named a Fellow of the American Institute of Graphic Arts [AIGA] in 2009.

== Early life and education ==
Piercy was born in Cheltenham, England, United Kingdom, to Kitty (nee Burke) and Ray Piercy. He was the youngest of three children.

As a teenager, Piercy developed two preoccupations: graphic design, and America. Piercy said later that realized he wanted to be designer by age 11, when he first saw the Peter Blake's “wonderful” cover of the Beatles' album Sgt Pepper's Lonely Hearts Club Band, “which was full of American imagery.” Similarly, he was impressed and inspired by the New Oxford Shakespeare series of book covers by Milton Glaser, who he described as the “greatest living American graphic designer.” At the same time, he developed a fascination with American life and culture, and especially with southern California: “California was so glamorous...I was particularly enamored with Los Angeles, just looking at Billy Wilder films and Max Yavno photos, all that.”

Piercy studied graphic design and illustration at Brighton School of Art and Technology (now the University of Brighton School of Art), and graduated with honors.

== Professional life ==
From 1978–1979, Piercy worked at Harpers & Queen in London as an editorial designer. There he met and partnered with designer Michael Hogdson, with whom he continued a professional collaboration for several decades.

In 1979, Piercy took a position in the in-house design department at the BBC in London, working primarily on television graphics. He described his experience there as formative, teaching him standards that influenced him throughout his career: “The greatest lesson I learned there, and one that I carry with me always, is that they showed me how vital it is to use all of your outside influences and interests in your work, that ideas count for much more than showy layouts, and that an atmosphere of friendship and good humor must inhabit any worthwhile creative studio environment.”

In 1982, Piercy emigrated to the United States with his wife, illustrator Ann Field. They settled in Santa Monica, California. “It was so exciting to be here in the eighties,” he said. “There was so much sky in Los Angeles, compared to where I had come from,” said Piercy. “You can't help but be influenced by it.”

As a designer at the Rod Dyer Design Group, Piercy created several well-known works and projects, including movie posters and album covers. He also helped re-design Santa Monica's Shangri-La Hotel (“a dream job”), and designed the daily newspaper supplement on the 1984 Olympics for the Los Angeles Times.

With partner Michael Hodgson, Piercy founded Ph.D, a design and communications firm in Santa Monica. Clients included Nike, Herman Miller, Chronicle Books, and Quiksilver. It was at Ph.D that Piercy developed his mature style, which was characterized by its typography, “unique and delicious” use of color, art direction of fashion photography, and sense of humor; Ph.D's work was praised for its “visual acuity, crisp thinking and penetrating wit.”

In 2007, Piercy established air conditioned, a graphic design firm in Santa Monica focusing predominantly on clients from creative industries. Los Angeles writer Jack Skelley observed that Piercy's work in this period, no matter the context, exhibited wit and a sense of play: “Whether in advertising or art, Clive fused word and image with an arch slyness. Even the most straightforward layout held a layer of satire, or at least playfulness.”

== Notable works ==
Piercy created and art-directed hundreds of projects for a wide range of clients, including posters, album covers, logos, book designs, signage, exterior graphics, exhibition designs, interior design concepts, and package designs. Among Piercy's better-known works:

- Album cover design, Elton John, Too Low for Zero (1983)
- Brand design, Wallis Annenberg Center for the Performing Arts (Los Angeles)
- Album cover design, Julian Lennon, Help Yourself (1991) (collaboration with Ann Field)
- Book design for Unplugged kitchen: A Return to the Simple, Authentic Joys of Cooking, by Viana LaPlace (1996) (collaboration with Ann Field)
- Book design for Curb Your Enthusiasm: The Book, by Larry David (2006) (collaboration with Ann Field)
- Book design for Living in a Modern Way: California Design, 1930–1965, edited by Wendy Kaplan (2011)
- Book design for An Eames Primer, by Eames Demetrios (2013)
- Opening titles for Married in America, a television documentary directed by Michael Apted. (2003)

In addition, Piercy collaborated with John Sabel on the David Fincher movie Se7en (1995). Piercy and Sabel designed and produced serial killer John Doe's highly visual diaries, which figured prominently in the film and film titles.

== Awards, honors, and exhibitions ==
In 2009, Piercy was named a Fellow of the American Institute of Graphic Arts [AIGA], recognizing designers who have made a significant contribution to raising the standards of excellence in practice.

Piercy received multiple recognitions for his design work, both solo and in collaboration with others:

- Nomination, Grammy Award for Best Recording Package, Late Night Sessions (1999)
- Group show, Bleak: American Beauty, Chandler Fine Art, San Francisco (2004)
- Nomination, James Beard Award for Restaurant Design (2012)
- Exhibition, 100 Years of Graphic Design, Kemistry Gallery, London (2015)

In 2023, a retrospective exhibit of Piercy's life and work, "HELLO LA: Clive Piercy – Inside the Mind of a Designer," was mounted at Art Center College of Design.

== Writing ==
In 2003, Piercy published Pretty Vacant: The Los Angeles Dingbat Observed (Chronicle Books, 2003), a book of largely black-and-white photographs showcasing the dingbat, a type of vernacular apartment building that was popular in Los Angeles in the 1950s and 1960s, and which was first brought to scholarly attention in Reyner Banham's book Los Angeles: the Architecture of Four Ecologies. Piercy's book was praised by critics both for its content (his approach was likened to the serial documentary photographs of Ed Ruscha) and its design.

== Teaching ==
Piercy was a professor at Art Center College of Design in Pasadena, California, serving on the faculty of the Graphic Design and Illustration departments. “Teaching is a very big part of what I do,” he said. “It has fueled my creative soul in a big way.” In the 90's, he also taught graphic design at Otis College of Art & Design.

Piercy himself repeated this advice to students, urging them above all to manifest themselves in their work: "There are plenty of designers in the world; we are doing perfectly well without you. But what there is a true lack of is great graphic designers. So that is your obligation if you are in this class, to be great. And the greatest thing you can do as a designer is have work that is representative of your character, that reflects who you are, that is a manifestation of your taste."

== Personal life ==
Piercy was married to British-American illustrator Ann Field, with whom he collaborated frequently.

He died in Santa Monica in 2017, of cancer.
