= Robert Piercey =

Canadian philosopher

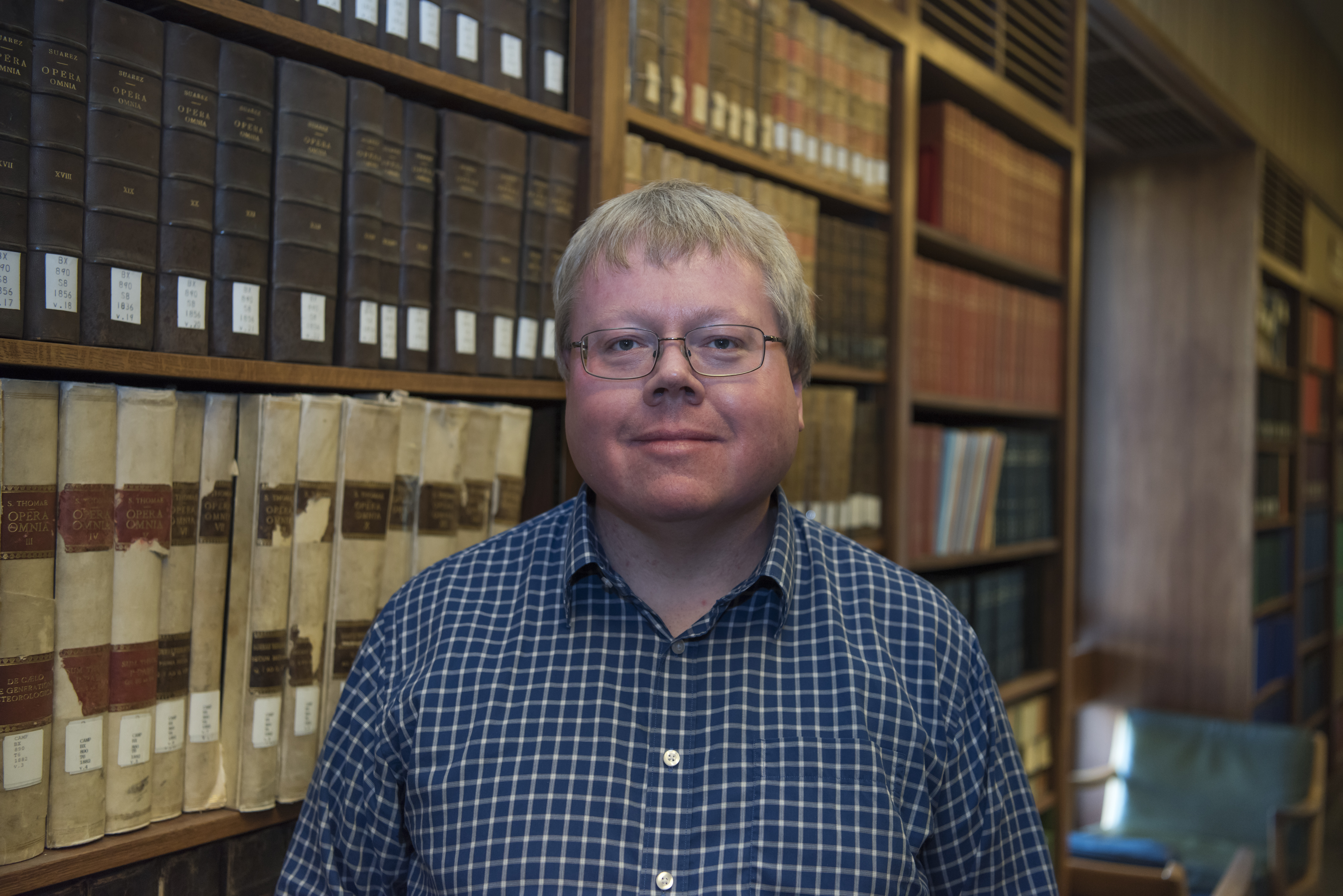

Education
- Education: Ph.D (University of Notre Dame); MA (University of Warwick); BA (Memorial University)
- Thesis: Truth in History: The Crisis in Continental Philosophy of the History of Philosophy (2001)
- Doctoral advisor: Stephen H. Watson
- Other advisors: Gary Gutting, Karl Ameriks, Fred Dallmayr, Gerald Bruns

Philosophical work
- Era: 21st-century philosophy
- Region: Western philosophy
- School: Continental
- Institutions: University of Regina

Robert Piercey is a Canadian philosopher and Professor of Philosophy at Campion College, University of Regina. He is a former editor of Philosophy in Review. Piercey is known for his works on continental philosophy.

== Books ==
- Reading as a Philosophical Practice. Anthem Press, 2020.
- The Uses of the Past From Heidegger to Rorty: Doing Philosophy Historically. Cambridge University Press, 2009.
- The Crisis in Continental Philosophy: History, Truth and the Hegelian Legacy. Continuum, 2009.
