= Newsholme =

Newsholme may refer to:

- Newsholme, East Riding of Yorkshire, England
- Newsholme, Lancashire, England
- Newsholme, West Yorkshire, England
- Sir Arthur Newsholme, public health expert
