= Thomas Percy (Pilgrimage of Grace) =

English conspirator

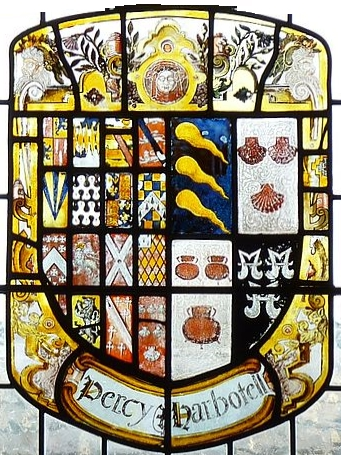
Arms of Sir Thomas Percy and his wife Eleanor Harbottle on a 16th-century window in Petworth House, Sussex

Sir Thomas Percy (c. 1504 – 2 June 1537) was a participant in the 1537 Bigod's Rebellion in the aftermath of the Pilgrimage of Grace, a Catholic uprising against King Henry VIII. He was convicted of treason and hanged, drawn and quartered at Tyburn. The Catholic Encyclopedia (1913) states that he "is considered a martyr by many".

== Origins ==
He was born in about 1504 at Alnwick Castle, Northumberland, the second son of Henry Percy, 5th Earl of Northumberland by his wife Lady Catherine Spencer.

== Inheritance in his issue ==
His elder brother Henry Percy, 6th Earl of Northumberland, who had long been failing in health, died after having been persuaded to leave all his estates to King Henry VIII. However, the earldom was restored to Thomas's eldest son, who was succeeded in the title by his younger brother, from whom all later Earls and Dukes of Northumberland are descended.

== Marriage and children ==
Percy married Eleanor Harbottle, daughter of Guiscard Harbottle of Beamish, County Durham (d. Battle of Flodden Field), by his wife Jane Willoughby, with whom he had seven children:

- Thomas Percy, 7th Earl of Northumberland,
- Henry Percy, 8th Earl of Northumberland,
- Guiscard Percy
- Richard Percy
- Joan Percy
- Mary Percy, wife of Sir Francis Slingsby; progenitors of all Slingsby Baronets
- Catherine Percy, ancestor of American rapper Eminem.
