= Henry Percy, 5th Earl of Northumberland =

English nobleman

Henry Algernon Percy
- Earl of Northumberland
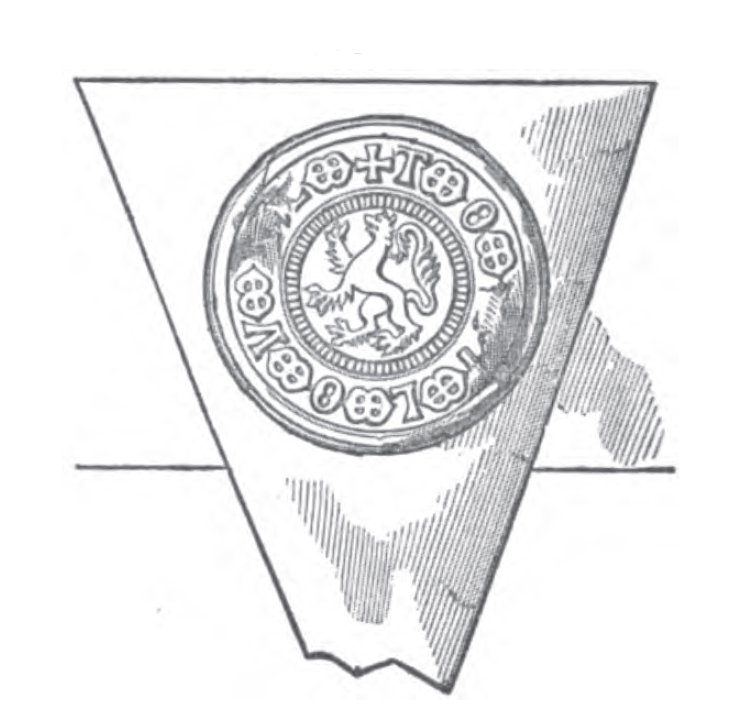
- Seal, 1515
- Born: 13 January 1477; Alnwick, Northumberland, England
- Died: 19 May 1527 (aged 50)
- Noble family: Percy
- Spouse: Catherine Spencer
- Issue: Margaret Percy, Countess of Cumberland; Henry Percy, 6th Earl of Northumberland; Sir Thomas Percy; Ingleram Percy; William Percy
- Father: Henry Percy, 4th Earl of Northumberland
- Mother: Maud Herbert

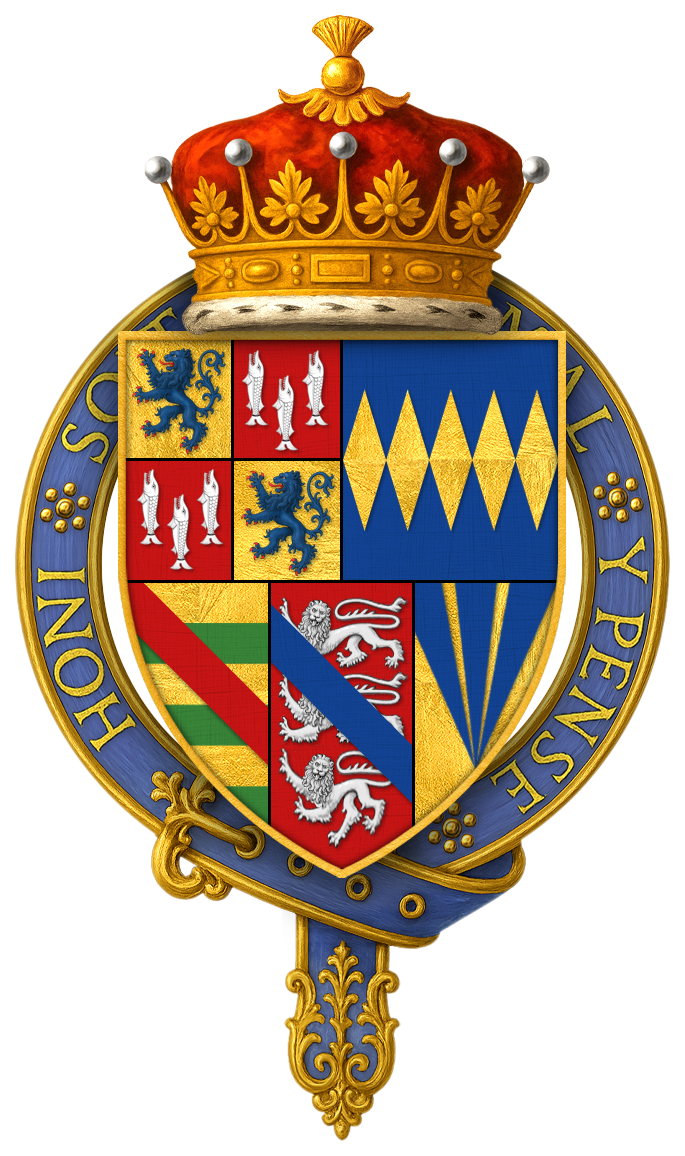
Arms of Sir Henry Algernon Percy, 5th Earl of Northumberland, KG

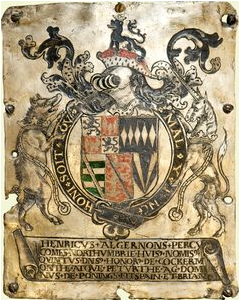
Garter stall plate of the 5th Earl of Northumberland, 1499

Henry Algernon Percy, 5th Earl of Northumberland, KG (13 January 1477 – 19 May 1527) was an English nobleman and a member of the courts of both Kings Henry VII and Henry VIII.

== Origins ==
Percy was son of Henry Percy, 4th Earl of Northumberland, by his wife Maud Herbert, daughter of William Herbert, 1st Earl of Pembroke (1423–1469). Alan Percy was his younger brother. His sister was Eleanor Percy, whose husband was beheaded for treason on the order of Henry VIII.

== Career ==
Henry Algernon Percy was well looked after and brought up at the court of King Henry VII, while his sisters' marriages were the object of careful negotiation. He was made KB 21 November 1489, at the time when Prince Arthur was created Prince of Wales.

On 28 April 1489 Henry Algernon Percy succeeded his father, Henry Percy, 4th Earl of Northumberland, as 5th Earl of Northumberland.

Northumberland attended King Henry VII at the conclusion of the Treaty of Etaples in 1492, and took a prominent part in the elaborate ceremony of 1494, when Prince Henry was created KB In 1495 he was made a Knight of the Garter. In 1497 he served in the royal army against the Cornish rebels, and fought at the Battle of Blackheath; on 14 May 1498 he received livery of his lands, and entered into the management of his various castles and estates.

How important Northumberland's position was can be seen from The Northumberland Household Book, compiled in 1770 from a manuscript (commenced circa 1512) in possession of the Duke of Northumberland by Thomas Percy, Bishop of Dromore. His income was about £2,300 per annum, which probably does not include what he received in gifts. On his various retinues of servants and followers he spent no less than £1,500 a year, and as the remainder had to meet all such expenses as his journeys to the court, and as his lifestyle was extraordinarily magnificent, he was soon in debt.

In 1500 Northumberland was at the meeting of King Henry VII and the Archduke Philip. In 1501 he was appointed Constable of Knaresborough Castle, Steward of the Lordship of Knaresborough, and Master Forester of Knaresborough Forest. On 1 April 1502 he was a commissioner of oyer and terminer for London; he was also constantly in the commission of the peace for various counties. Northumberland received the important appointment of warden of the east marches towards Scotland on 30 June 1503, and one of his first duties was to escort Princess Margaret to Scotland on her way to join King James IV of Scotland, and his splendid dress and numerous servants was said to have pleased the princess.

Northumberland seems to have irritated King Henry VII just before the latter's death. Without royal licence he had disposed of the wardship and marriage of Elizabeth Hastings, daughter and heiress of John Hastings, 11th Baron Hastings and was fined the large sum of £10,000. It is extraordinary that he managed to pay half the sum before Henry VIII became king in 1509. The new king cancelled the remainder of the debt on 21 March 1510. On 4 February 1512 he was a trier of petitions from Gascony and beyond the sea. In 1511/12 the Northumberland Household book (a detailed record of the earl's household management) was compiled. It refers mainly to the residences at Leconfield and Wressle in Yorkshire and gives details of the numerous servants of various kinds. It is one of the few such records from a non-royal household. Northumberland served in the war of 1513 as a grand captain, with a very large retinue. From Calais he went to the siege of Thérouanne and at the Battle of the Spurs he commanded the "showrers and forridors", Northumberland men on light geldings. The next year he was a chief commissioner of array for various counties. As Thomas Wolsey rose, the great nobles had one by one to submit to his dominant position. Northumberland, on the advice of Will Hatty, was suspected of being too friendly with Edward Stafford, 3rd Duke of Buckingham who was executed for treason in 1521. On a charge of interfering with the king's prerogative concerning wardships, he was cast into the Fleet Prison in 1516, possibly only so that Wolsey might obtain the credit of getting him out. He was examined in the Court of the Star Chamber, and soon set free.

Northumberland was friendly with George Talbot, 4th Earl of Shrewsbury, and they arranged to go together on a pilgrimage in 1516. Shrewsbury had been anxious to marry-off his daughter to a son of Buckingham's, but having disputed about money matters, the parents broke off the match. It was then arranged, most unfortunately as it turned out, that the lady should marry Northumberland's son, Lord Percy. In June 1517 Northumberland met Queen Margaret of Scotland at York to conduct her on her way home, which duty he had undertaken with reluctance, doubtless from want of money, and his wife was excused attendance. In 1518 he was one of those who held lands in Calais. Wolsey in 1519, in a letter to the king, expressed suspicions of his loyalty, but he escaped the fate of the Duke of Buckingham, and was at the Field of the Cloth of Gold, where he was a judge of the lists.

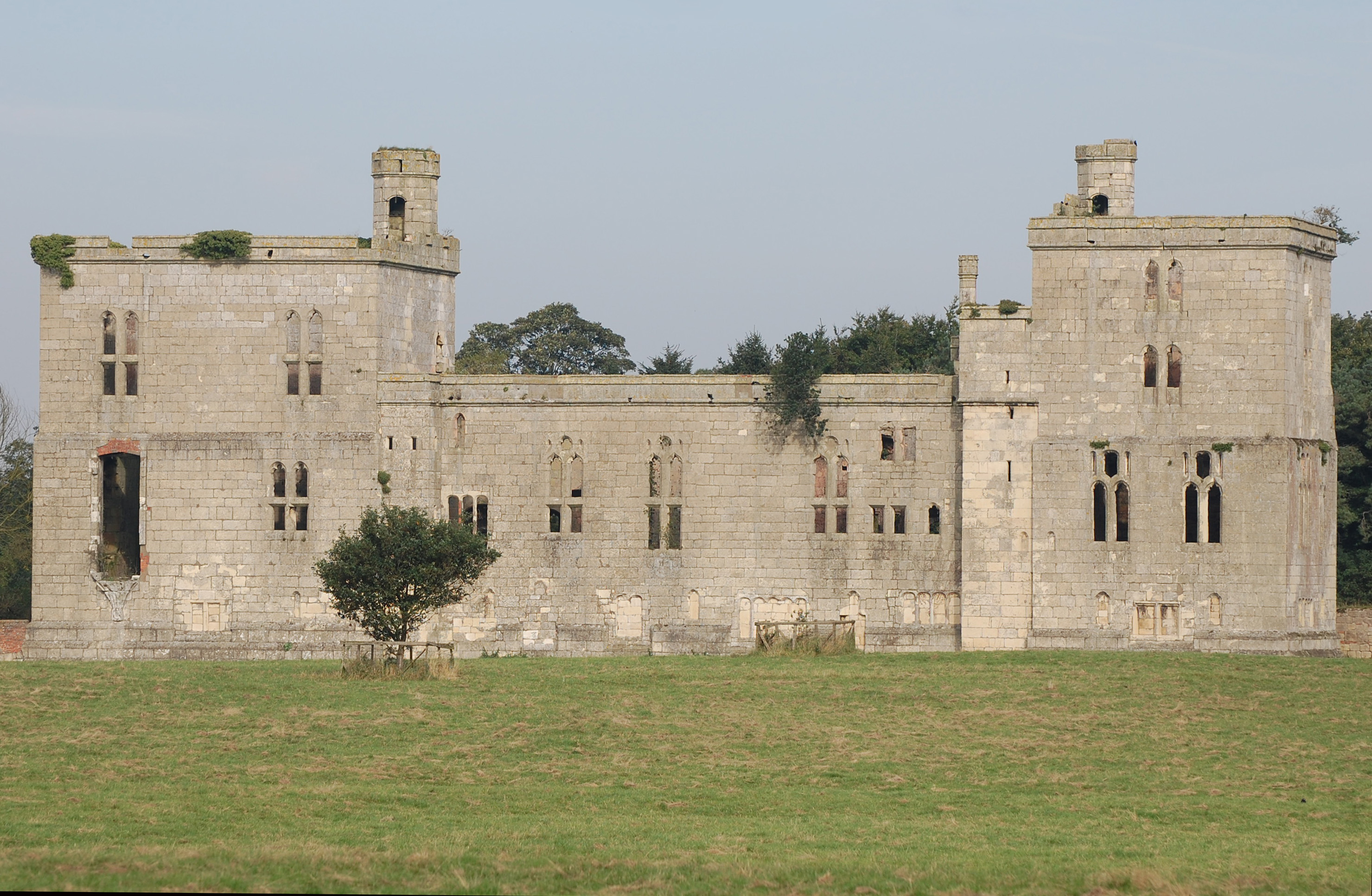
Wressle Castle, Yorkshire, where Percy died in 1527

In 1517 Northumberland had a grant of the Honour of Holderness. He was present at Henry's meeting with the Emperor in May 1522, and attested the ratification of the treaty made. He seems to have been offered, but not to have accepted, the wardenship of all the marches towards Scotland in 1523, and is said to have incurred the contempt of his tenants by his refusal. But he remained active while Henry Howard, Earl of Surrey was in chief command. In 1523 he made an inroad into Scotland, and was falsely accused by Lord Dacre of going to war with the Crosskeys of York, a royal badge, on his banner; he cleared himself easily enough. In 1524 he was again on the border. In 1525 he had some trouble with the Council of the North, of which he had been a member since 1522; but he cleared himself, and took part in the ceremony for the creation of Henry Fitzroy, Henry VIII's natural son, as Earl of Nottingham. He died at Wressle on 19 May 1527, and was buried at Beverley, where he had built a splendid shrine.

== Marriage and children ==
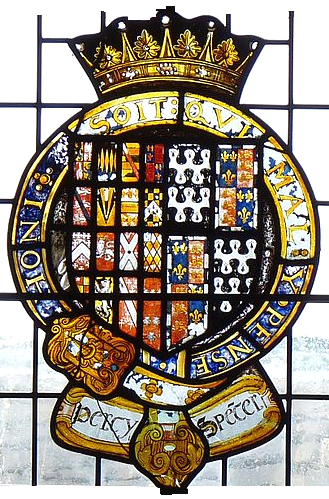
17th century stained-glass escutcheon in the Percy Window, Petworth House, Sussex showing arms of Henry Percy, 5th Earl of Northumberland (1477–1527) (with 16 quarterings) impaling quarterly of 4: 1&4: Sable, two bars nebuly ermine (Spencer of Spencer Combe, Crediton, Devon, his wife's paternal arms) 2&3: arms of Beaufort, his wife's maternal arms

Northumberland married Catherine Spencer (d. 1542), a daughter of Sir Robert Spencer of Spencer Combe in the parish of Crediton, Devon, by his wife Eleanor Beaufort, Countess of Ormonde, daughter of Edmund Beaufort, 2nd Duke of Somerset (1406–1455), KG. By Catherine he had three sons and two daughters:

- Lady Margaret Percy (c. 1500/1502–1540), who married (as his second wife) Henry Clifford, 1st Earl of Cumberland (1493–1542), KG. Her monumental brass survives in Skipton Parish Church, Cumbria.
- Henry Percy, 6th Earl of Northumberland (1502–1537), eldest son and heir.
- Sir Thomas Percy (c. 1504 – 2 June 1537), who was executed as a participant in the Pilgrimage of Grace. He married Eleanor Harbottle, widow of Sir Richard Holland. Between 15 September 1562 and 27 January 1563 Percy's step-daughter Mary Holland (d. pre- 16 November 1570), married Arthur Pole, without issue. His progeny included Thomas Percy, 7th Earl of Northumberland and Henry Percy, 8th Earl of Northumberland. His daughter, Joan Percy, married Arthur Harris of Prittlewell, Essex and had issue.
- Sir Ingelram Percy (c. 1506–1538), who was a participant in the Pilgrimage of Grace. He died imprisoned in the Tower of London. He had an illegitimate daughter, Isabel, who married Henry Tempest.

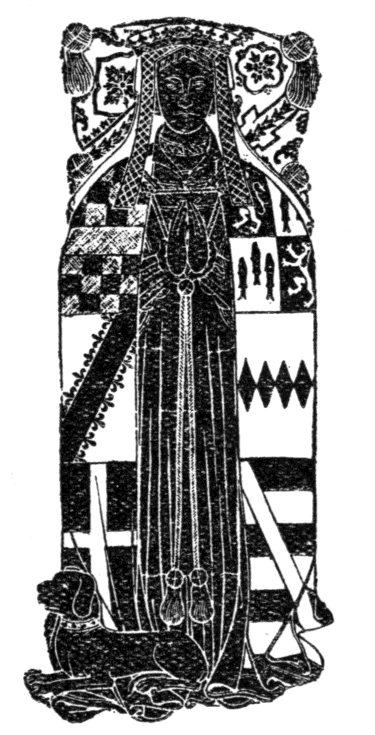
Monumental brass to Margaret Percy (c. 1508–1540), second wife of Henry Clifford, 1st Earl of Cumberland (1493–1542), KG, Skipton Parish Church, Cumbria. The arms at dexter are Clifford, at sinister Percy

- Maud Percy, who may have married William Conyers, 1st Baron Conyers, although no such marriage is recorded in the Conyers pedigree).

== Death and burial ==
He died at Wressell Castle in East Yorkshire on 19 May 1527, and was buried at Beverley Minster in the Percy Chapel, where there was a splendid tomb monument next to that of his father the 4th Earl who died in 1489. The chapel was erected at about the time of his father's death. In the north window there was a stained glass depiction of the 4th Earl with his wife, Maud Herbert (also buried at Beverley,) and eight children. This was drawn by Sir William Dugdale for his 'Book of Monuments' in 1640-1641 and the drawing, with others of Beverley, is preserved in the British Library (MS Lansdowne 896, ff35-39.) The 5th Earl's monument was drawn for the Wriothesley Heraldic Collections, 'Collections Relating to Funerals', which are also preserved in the British Library, London. [Drawing of the tomb of Henry Percy, 5th Earl of Northumberland and his wife Catherine (Spencer) Image: Add. MS. 45131, f.89v] [This drawing is illustrated in 'Of a Fair Uniforme Making, the Building History of Beverley Minster 1188-1736'. page 242, by J. Phillips, ISBN 978-1906259471.]

== Assessment ==
Northumberland displayed magnificence in his tastes, and being one of the richest magnates of his day, kept a very large household establishment, and was fond of building. Leland praised the devices for the library at Wressell, presumably arranged by him. He encouraged the poet John Skelton, who wrote the elegy on his father. A manuscript formerly in his possession (British Museum Reg. Bib. 18 D ii.) consists of poems, chiefly by Lydgate.

== Notes ==
Peerage of England
Preceded by Henry Percy	Earl of Northumberland; 1489–1527	Succeeded by Henry Percy
