= Henry Percy, 6th Earl of Northumberland =

English military officer

Henry Percy
- The Earl of Northumberland
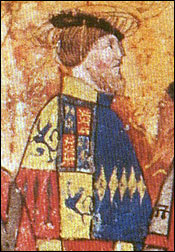
- Henry in the Black Book of the Garter, c. 1534
- Born: c. 1502; Nottingham
- Died: 29 June 1537
- Buried: Hackney Church
- Noble family: Percy
- Spouse: Mary Talbot
- Father: Henry Percy, 5th Earl of Northumberland
- Mother: Catherine Spencer

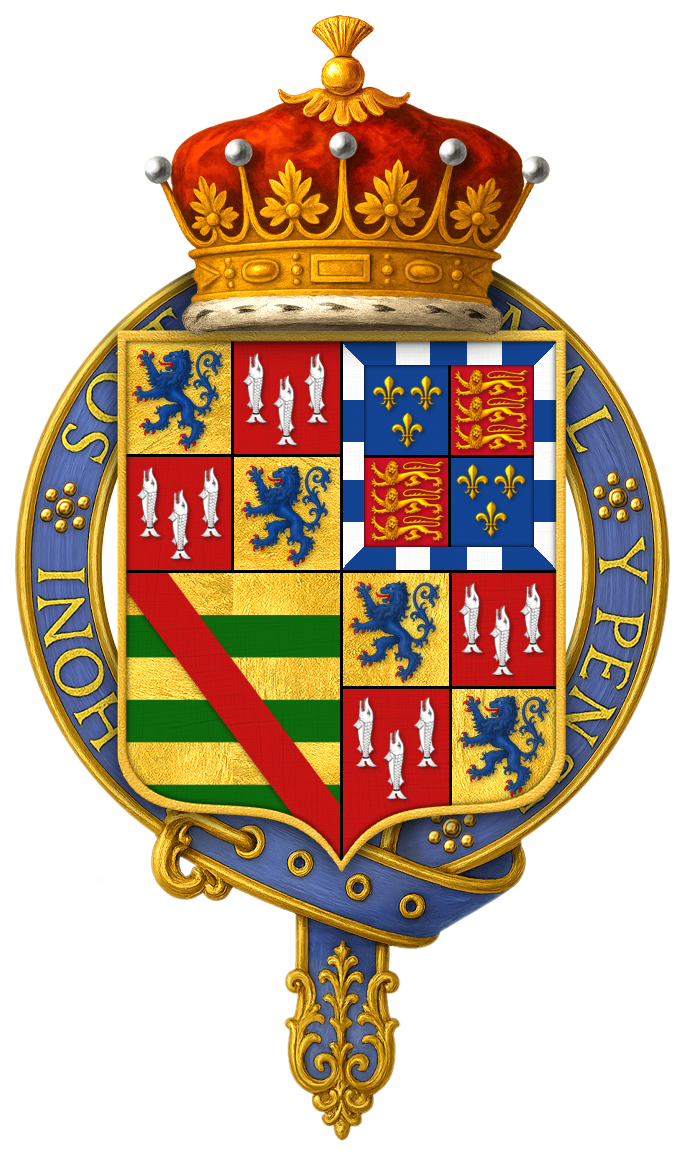
Arms of Sir Henry Percy, 6th Earl of Northumberland, KG

Henry Percy, 6th Earl of Northumberland, KG (c. 1502 – 1537) was an English nobleman, active as a military officer in the north. He is now primarily remembered as the betrothed of Anne Boleyn, whom he was forced to give up before she became involved with and later married King Henry VIII.

== Early life ==
Henry Percy was born about 1502, the eldest son of Henry Algernon Percy, 5th Earl of Northumberland, by Catherine, daughter of Sir Robert Spencer. Through his mother he was a first cousin of William Carey, who was the brother-in-law to Anne Boleyn.

When quite young, Henry was sent to serve as a page in Thomas Wolsey's household. It was a way for young aristocrats to learn about their societies. He was knighted in 1519. The principal source for the early passages of Percy's life is the biography of Wolsey by George Cavendish.

== Involvement with Anne Boleyn ==
Though his father had planned by 1516 to betroth Percy to Mary Talbot, the daughter of George Talbot, 4th Earl of Shrewsbury, he fell in love with Anne Boleyn, then a young lady about the court. Percy became betrothed to Anne, probably in the spring of 1523 when he was still page to Wolsey. On hearing the news, Wolsey scolded Lord Percy before his household, as permission for the marriage had not been sought from his father nor from the King. The latter had an interest due to the importance of the Northumberland earldom. While Cavendish claimed that the King already had a personal interest in Anne at this point, driving Wolsey's angry reaction, this has been debated. The intrigue was soon discovered, and the Earl of Northumberland sent for young Lord Percy.

Besides the proposed Talbot match, another serious obstacle was that Anne was intended to wed James Butler, 9th Earl of Ormond (who was then a page in Wolsey's household). This match was intended to manage and resolve a dispute over the earldom of Ormond involving Sir Thomas Boleyn, her father, who had a somewhat feeble claim on the vast Ormond estates in Munster through his grandfather.

Another significant reason for Percy's father's refusal to permit the match was that he believed Anne Boleyn, a mere knight's daughter, not a high enough rank for his son and heir.

== Marriage to Mary Talbot ==
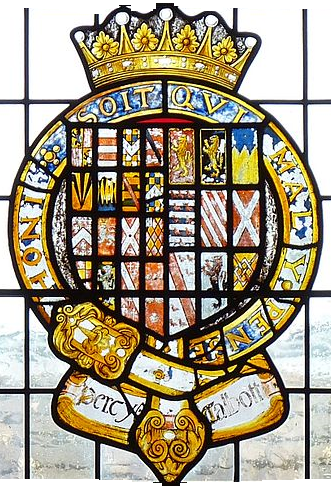
17th century stained glass escutcheon showing arms of Henry Percy, 6th Earl of Northumberland (c.1502–1537), KG, (with 16 quarters) impaling Talbot (with 9 quarters), paternal arms of his wife, all circumscribed by the Garter. Detail from Percy Window, Petworth House, Sussex

Percy's father reportedly scolded him, saying "thou hast always been a proud, presumptuous, and unthrift waster," and he was quickly and unhappily married to Lady Mary Talbot, daughter of the Earl of Shrewsbury, by early 1524 or in 1525, with earlier legal stages. Starkey dates it at August 1525 or August 1526. The old earl allowed the couple little in the way of comforts or income. Wolsey attempted to insinuate his own servants into the household as a means of controlling the young Henry.

By 1528, only four years into their marriage, the couple's relationship had broken down irretrievably. Northumberland suspected his wife of spying on him for Norfolk, while her father worried that the young husband was abusing her and might even poison her. Northumberland was outraged at Shrewsbury's suspicions and refused to permit his father-in-law's servants to see or speak to his wife. When the countess's brother-in-law, William, Lord Dacre, asked the Duke of Norfolk to defend her, Northumberland told Norfolk that he, Northumberland, would never see her again as long as he lived. The couple may have separated shortly thereafter, at least temporarily, since Mary delivered a stillborn child at her father's home in April 1529. In 1532, Mary accused her husband of a precontract (i.e. betrothal with legal force) with Anne Boleyn. She confided her alleged grievance to her father, who then mentioned the matter to Thomas Howard, 3rd Duke of Norfolk. Anne Boleyn, consulted, ordered an inquiry. Northumberland denied the accusation on oath.

In 1536 Shrewsbury noted his daughter had been living with him for two and half years. At about the same time, Northumberland announced that he was bequeathing his entire inheritance to the King since he had no children, and he and his wife were not likely to have a legitimate heir. He was by then also estranged from his brothers, and did not want them to inherit his property. Mary Talbot hated Henry heartily for the rest of his short life, and later sought a divorce.

== Border warfare ==
In July 1522 Northumberland was made a member of the Council of the North; in October he was made deputy warden of the East Marches. His brother-in-law William Dacre suggested that, young as Northumberland was, he should be made warden the same year.

On 19 May 1527 he succeeded his father as sixth Earl of Northumberland; he was made steward of the honour of Holderness on 18 June. On 2 December he became Lord Warden of the East and West Marches.

Northumberland was constantly ill with an ague–a feverish, shivery illness, probably malaria–and was burdened with debt, and yet had to keep up an establishment and engage in fighting on his own account. Cardinal Wolsey treated him in a patronising manner. He was not often allowed to go to court, nor even to his father's funeral. His chief friend was Sir Thomas Arundell.

In spite of all this, Northumberland was very active on the borders. He had leave in 1528 to come to London; in 1530, while he was at Topcliffe, he received a message from the king ordering him to go to Cawood and arrest Wolsey. He sent his prisoner south in the custody of Sir Roger Lascelles, while he remained to make an inventory of the Cardinal's goods. He was one of the peers who signed the letter to the Pope in July 1530 asking that the divorce might be hurried on, was a friend of Sir Thomas Legh, and possibly was a reformer. On 23 April 1531 he was created Knight of the Garter. On 11 May 1532 he was made High Sheriff of Northumberland for life and on 26 April, a privy councillor.

Northumberland was accused of slackness on the borders, and also of having a sword of state carried before him when he went as justiciary to York. If illness was in part responsible, Eustace Chapuys also ranked him, on information which he had from his doctor, among the disaffected early in 1535.

In May 1536 Northumberland, by now a man in broken health, formed one of the jury for the trial of Anne Boleyn. Anne is said to have confessed a precontract with him in the hope of saving her life. He collapsed following the verdict and had to be carried out.

== Later life ==
Having no children, Northumberland began to arrange his affairs. In February 1535 he wrote to Thomas Cromwell that he had decided to make the king his heir, a decision he confirmed later. In 1536 he was created Lord President of the Council of the North, and vicegerent of the Order of the Garter.

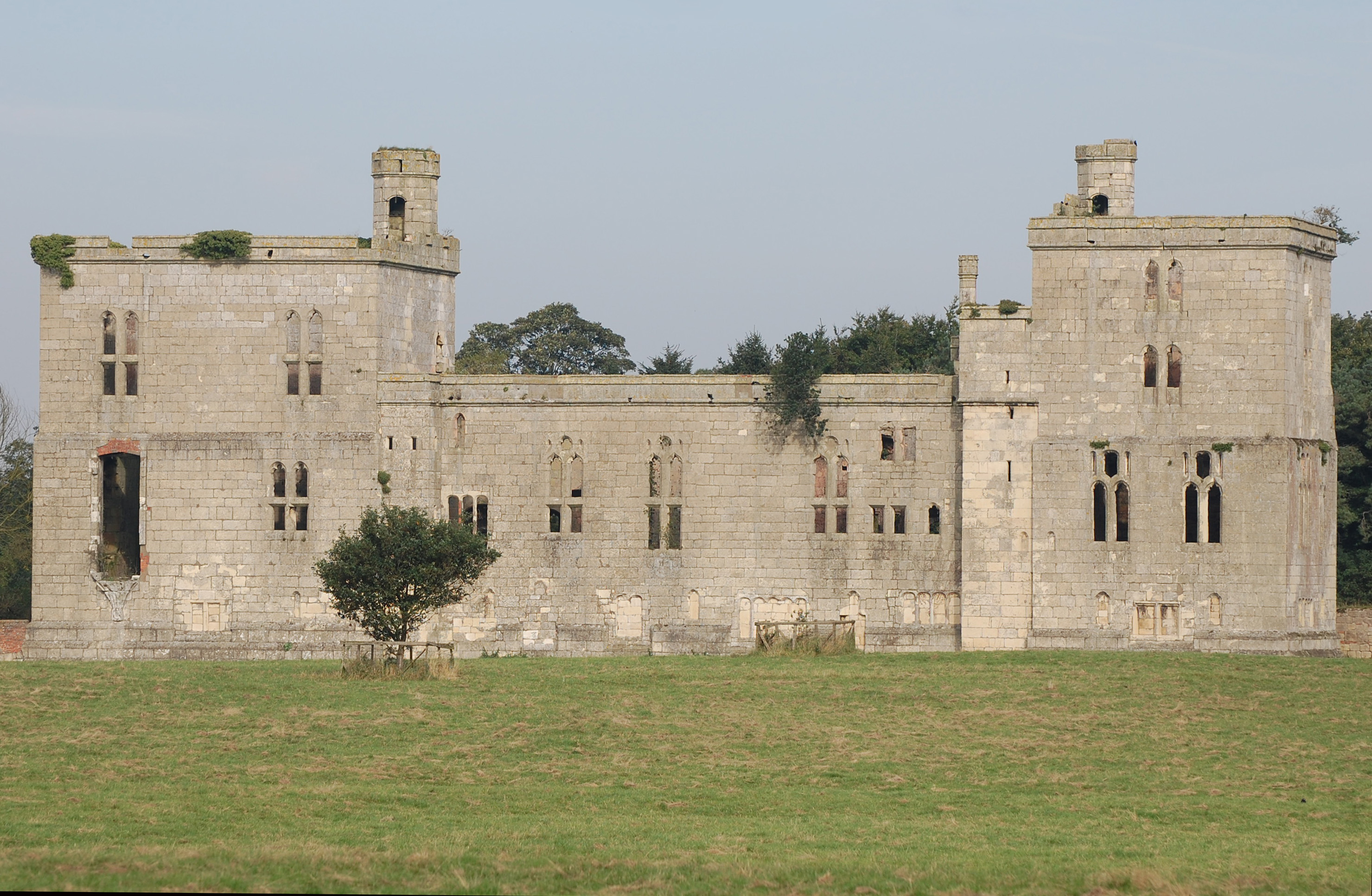
Wressle Castle, Yorkshire, where Robert Aske requested Percy to join the Pilgrimage of Grace.

In September 1536 he had a grant of £1,000 to come to London to make arrangements about his lands. The matter was incomplete when the Pilgrimage of Grace began. Northumberland's brothers and mother were open sympathisers with the rebels, but the Earl himself remained loyal to the Crown. The rebel leader Robert Aske and his men came to Wressle Castle, where Percy was ill in bed, and asked him to resign his commands of the marches into the hands of his brothers, or at least go over to the rebels. He refused both requests; and when the lawyer William Stapleton went up to see him, he was in despair. Aske sent him to York, to protect him from his followers, who wanted to behead him.

Northumberland made a grant to the king of his estates, on condition that they pass to his nephew. When, however, his brother, Sir Thomas, was attainted and executed, Northumberland made the grant unconditional in June 1537. By this time his mind was fast failing. He moved to Newington Green, where Richard Layton visited him on 29 June 1537. Layton found him yellow and distended.

Northumberland died on 30 June 1537 and was buried in St Augustin's Church, now the site of St John at Hackney parish church. Writing in the early seventeenth century, the antiquarian John Weever recorded Percy's original epitaph in the church, which read: 'Here lieth interred, Henry lord Percy, earl of Northumberland, knight of the most honourable order of the Garter, who died in this town the last of June 1537, the 29th of HEN VIII.' A (presumed Victorian era) memorial plaque was discovered during the 2020 refurbishment of St John at Hackney, and was re-installed inside the church.

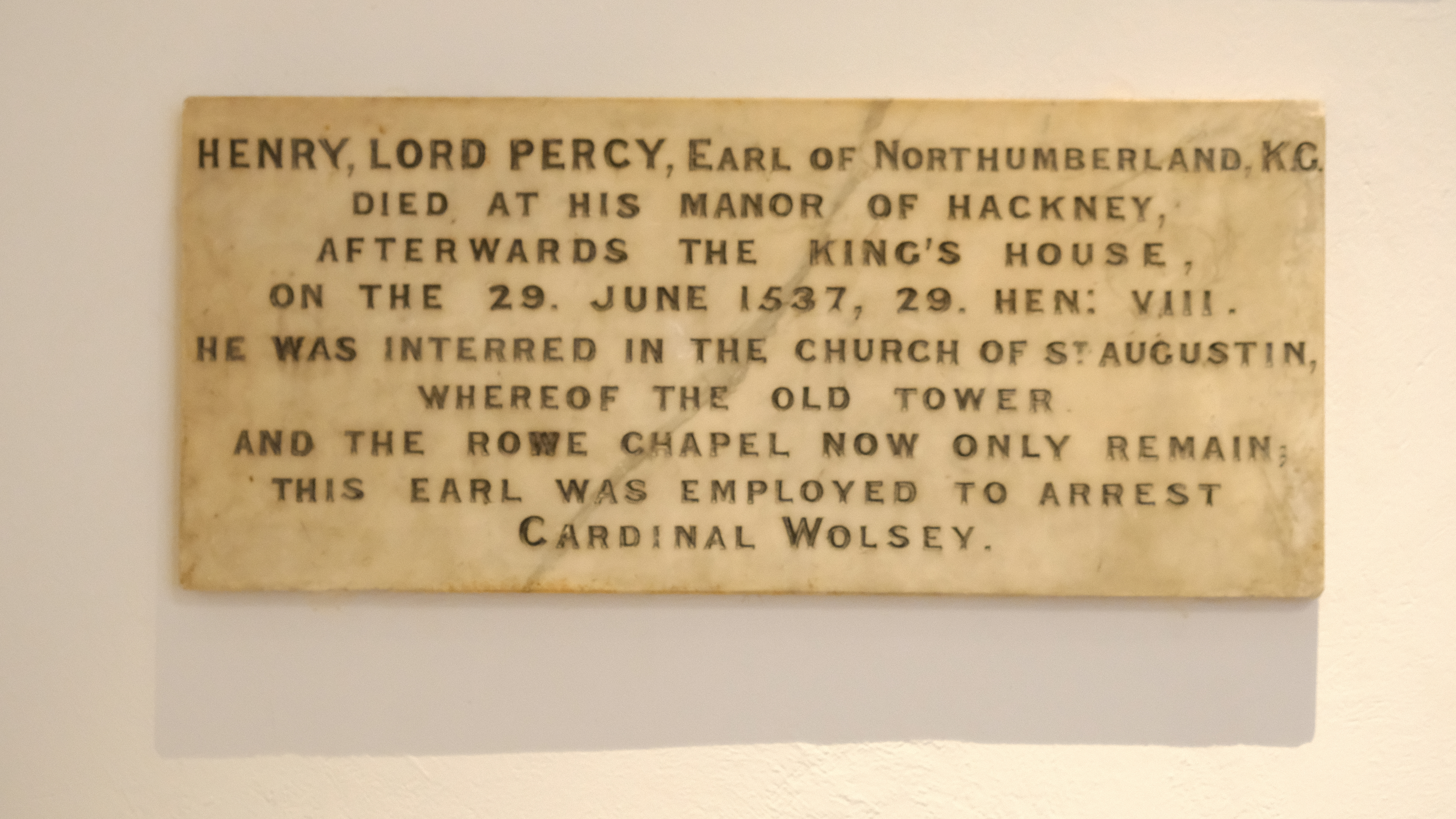
Presumed Victorian plaque commemorating the interring of the remains of Henry Percy at St Augustin's Church Hackney, in situ at St John at Hackney parish church.

== Family ==
He married, in 1524, Mary Talbot, daughter of George, 4th Earl of Shrewsbury, but left no surviving issue. They did have one known child, stillborn on April 1529 at the home of the earl of Shrewsbury, where Mary had gone to escape her husband. The earldom fell into abeyance on his death, but was revived in favour of his nephew Thomas. His widow lived until 1572.

Northumberland's two brothers, Sir Thomas and Sir Ingelram Percy, took an active part in the management of his estates. They were both leaders of the Pilgrimage of Grace. Both were arrested. Sir Thomas was attainted and executed in 1537. His sons succeeded to the earldom: Thomas as seventh earl and Henry as eighth earl. Sir Ingelram Percy was confined in the Beauchamp Tower, where his name is to be seen cut in the stone. He was soon liberated, went abroad into exile, and died June 30 1537. He left an out-of-wedlock daughter, Isabel, who, in 1544, married Henry Tempest of Broughton.

Peerage of England
Preceded by Henry Percy	Earl of Northumberland; 1527–1537	Succeeded by Thomas Percy
