= Brind =

Hamlet in the East Riding of Yorkshire, England

Coordinates: 53.769602°N 0.874062°W

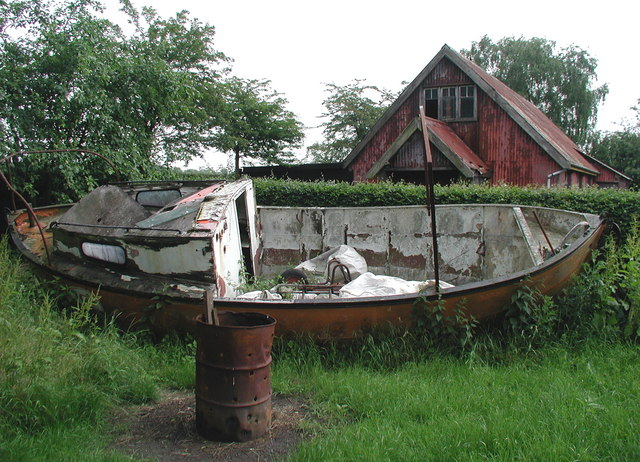
- Brind Chapel

- Location within the East Riding of Yorkshire
- OS grid reference: SE743309
  - London: 160 mi (260 km) S
- Civil parish: Wressle
- Unitary authority: East Riding of Yorkshire
- Ceremonial county: East Riding of Yorkshire
- Region: Yorkshire and the Humber
- Country: England
- Sovereign state: United Kingdom
- Post town: GOOLE
- Postcode district: DN14
- Dialling code: 01430
- Police: Humberside
- Fire: Humberside
- Ambulance: Yorkshire
- UK Parliament: Goole and Pocklington

Brind is a hamlet in the East Riding of Yorkshire, England, forming part of the civil parish of Wressle. It is situated approximately 2 miles (3 km) to the north of the market town of Howden and lies west of the B1228 road. The single track tarmac road (Brind Lane) runs through the entire hamlet, and joins the Wressle road to the north. In 1823 Brind with Newsholme was in the parish of Wressle, the Wapentake of Harthill and the Liberty of Howdenshire. Population at the time was 177.
