= Wressle Castle =

Late 14th-century quadrangular castle in the East Riding of Yorkshire, England

Coordinates: 53.7755°N 0.9287°W

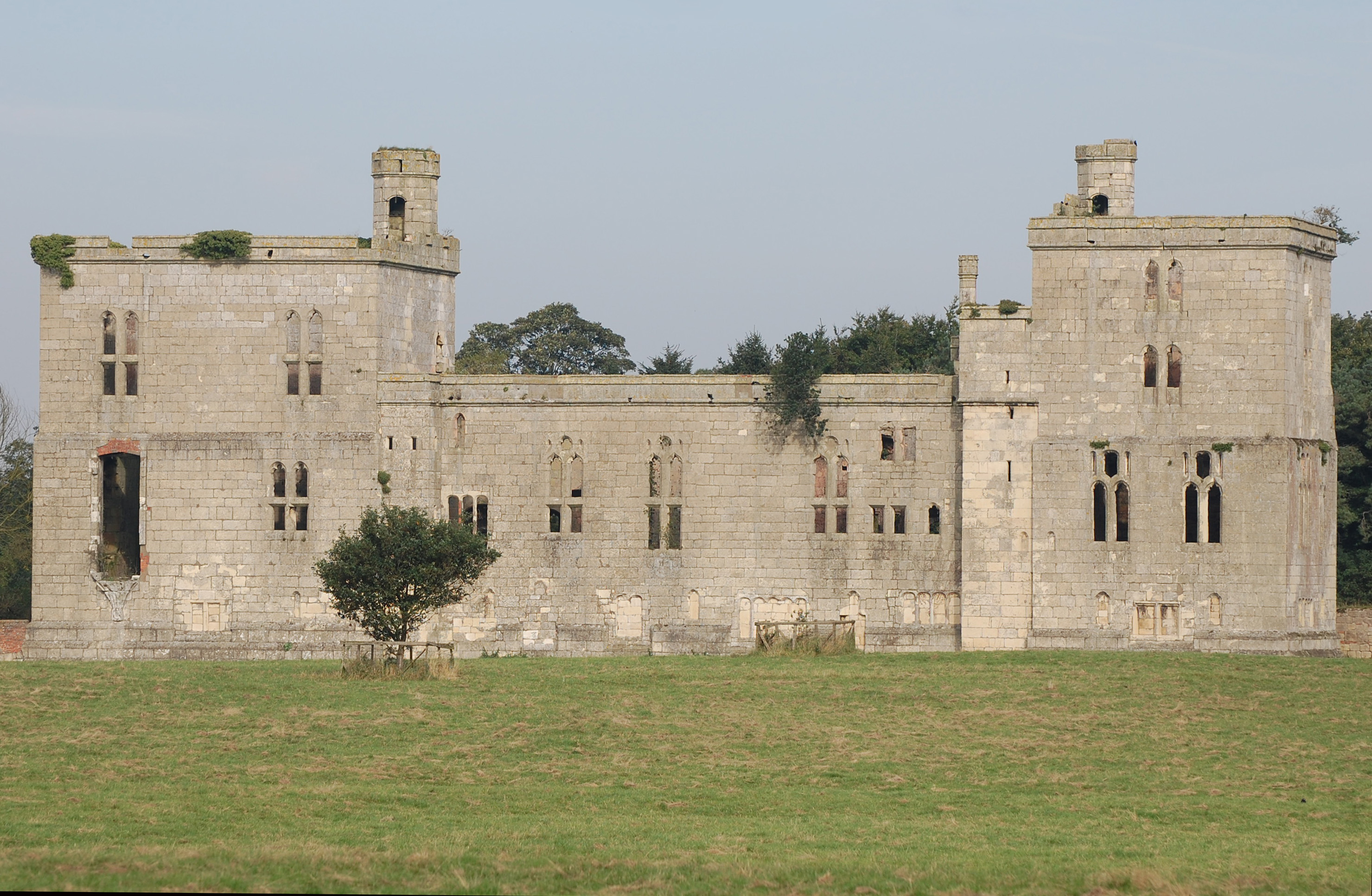
All that remains of the building is the south range

Wressle Castle is a ruined palace-fortress in the East Riding of Yorkshire, England, Ordnance Survey grid reference SE 708316. Built for Thomas Percy in the 1390s. It is privately owned and it is usually open to the public for a few days each year. Wressle Castle originally consisted of four ranges built around a central courtyard; there was a tower at each corner, and the structure was entered through a gatehouse in the east wall, facing the village.

After Thomas Percy was executed for rebelling against Henry IV, Wressle Castle was confiscated by the Crown. With occasional periods when it was granted to other people, the castle was mostly under royal control until 1471 when it was returned to the Percy family. Henry Percy, 5th Earl of Northumberland, refurbished the castle and gardens, bringing them to the standard of royal properties.

The castle was embedded within an ornamental landscape, with two gardens laid out at the same time as the castle was founded and a third created later. Wressle was intended as a high-status residence rather than a fortress and was never besieged. However, it was held by Parliament during the English Civil War and partly demolished in 1646–50, leaving the south range still standing. Nearly 150 years later, it was further damaged by a fire that struck the house. In the 21st century, Historic England, Natural England and the Country Houses Foundation funded repairs to the castle ruins.

== History ==
In the later Middle Ages, the Percy family was one of four major land-owning dynasties in Yorkshire. The 14th century saw their properties spread into Northumberland, though Yorkshire remained important. The Percys held the manor of Wressle from the early 14th century, and it was granted to Thomas Percy in 1364. Wressle Castle was first documented in 1402, but was probably built in the 1390s. By 1390, Thomas Percy had spent nearly ten years abroad as either a soldier or on diplomatic errands. From then on he was active in the royal sphere and friends of both Richard II and Henry IV. According to archaeologist and architectural historian Anthony Emery Wressle Castle was built “as a residence reflecting [the Earl’s] pedigree and distinguished state service”.

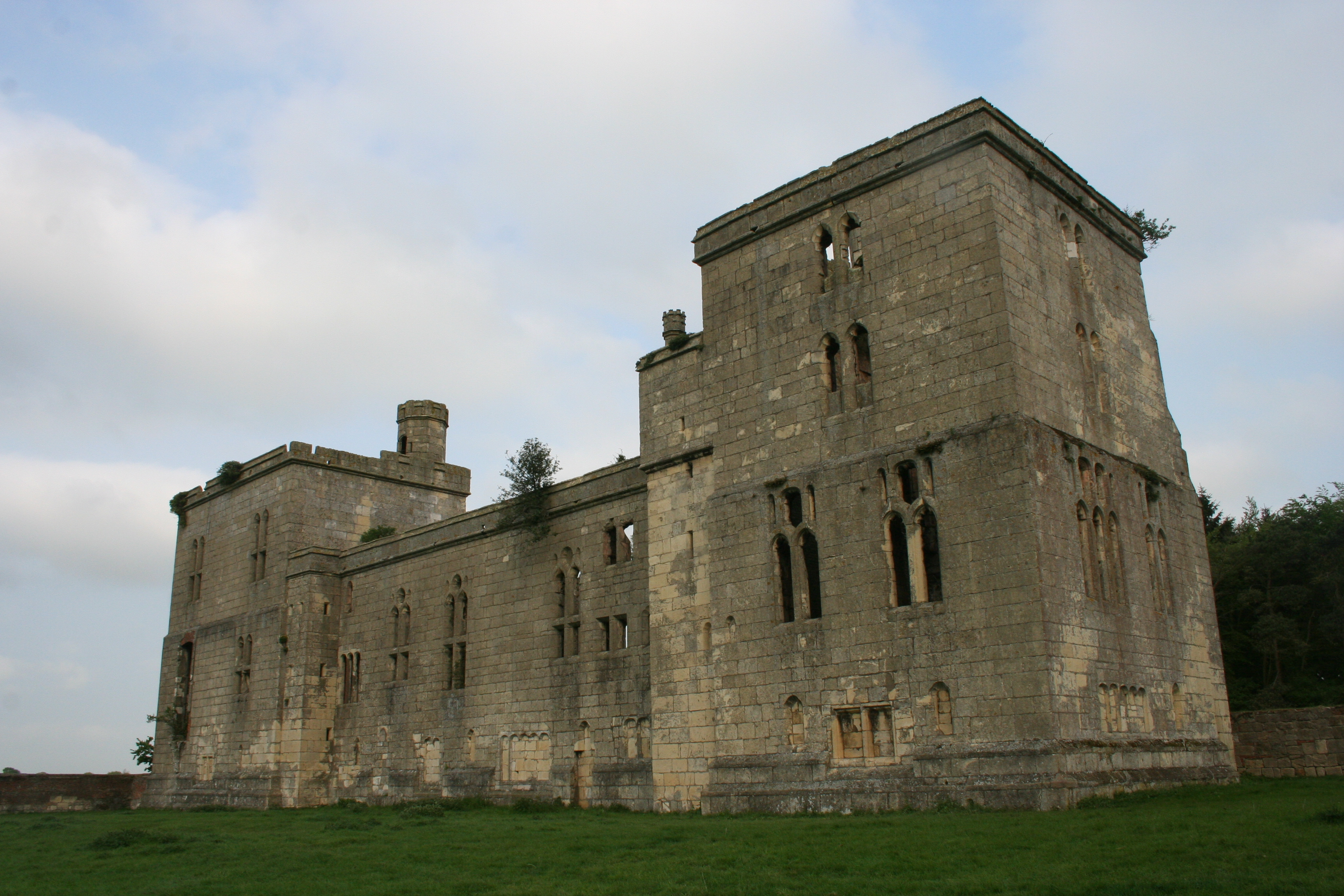
Ruins of Wressle Castle

Though Henry IV gave Thomas Percy influence in south Wales, relations between the two deteriorated due partly to delays in payment. Thomas’ nephew, Henry Percy, rose in armed rebellion in July 1403 and Thomas joined him. The rebellion culminated in the battle of Shrewsbury in which Thomas Percy was captured. Two days later, on 23 July, he was beheaded and his property – including Wressle Castle – was subsequently confiscated by the crown. Between 1403 and 1471 ownership of the castle swapped between the crown and those the reigning monarch chose to grant it to, though only for short periods. In 1471, Wressle Castle was given to Henry Percy, 4th Earl of Northumberland, returning it to the Percy family. His son, Henry Algernon Percy, 5th Earl of Northumberland, undertook an extensive programme of refurbishment at Wressle Castle, refurbishing the interior and updating the gardens. At the time he was one of the richest men in England. The Northumberland Household Book was compiled around this time and details day-to-day domestic activities at the castles of Wressle and Leconfield, and is used by historians to study the late medieval household.

Percy died at Wressle in 1527 and was succeeded by his son, Henry Algernon Percy, 6th Earl of Northumberland. The Pilgrimage of Grace was a popular revolt against the rule of Henry VIII in 1536 partly in response to the dissolution of the monasteries. The rebels in Yorkshire were led by Robert Aske and in October he sought the support of the Percy family. Aske travelled to Wressle Castle and tried to persuade Henry Algernon Percy, who at the time was suffering from illness, to join the rebellion. Though initially opposed to Aske, Percy eventually gave him control of Wressle Castle. Percy had fallen out with his younger brothers, and when he died in 1537 his one surviving brother did not inherit because he was imprisoned for his role in the Pilgrimage of Grace. In 1537, the crown again resumed control of Wressle Castle, and Henry VIII visited for three nights in 1541.

Antiquarian John Leland visited Wressle Castle in about 1540. He wrote in his Itinerary that the castle was "one of the most proper beyond the Trent, and seemeth as newly made ...The castle is all of very fair and great squared stone, both within and without". He also gave the first surviving description of the castle gardens, noting that they were "exceedingly fair" and with orchards beyond the moat. The Scottish nobleman Matthew Stewart, 4th Earl of Lennox was lodged at Wressle in January 1545.

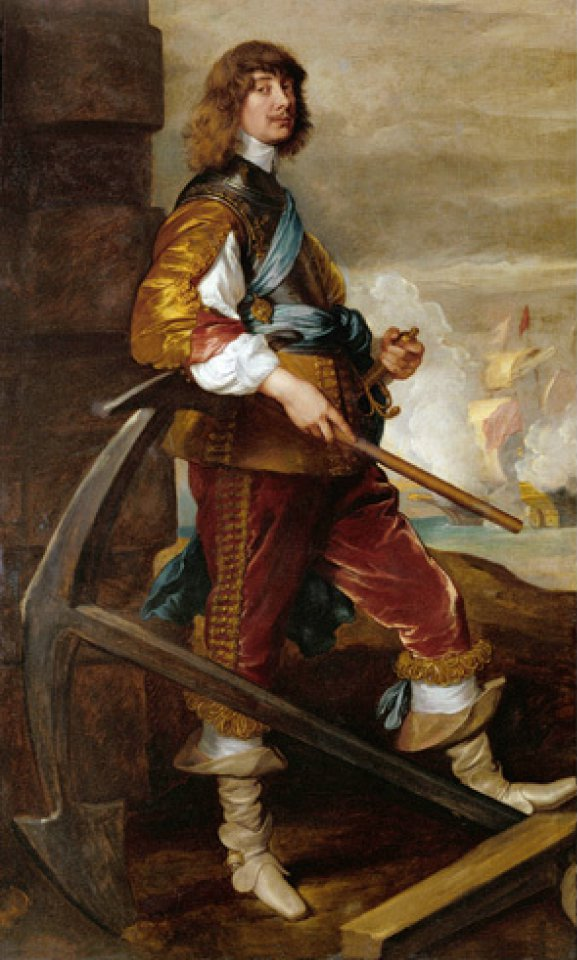
Algernon Percy, 10th Earl of Northumberland was ordered to complete demolition of Wressle Castle in 1650.

The castle was garrisoned by parliamentarians during the English Civil War during which time it was badly damaged. At the time it was estimated that the damaged to the castle and surrounding area would take £1,000 to repair. Wressle Castle was slighted (partially demolished) on several occasions in 1646–50. The 1648 demolition work was focused on the castle's battlements, with a contemporary letter noting that “[Parliament’s] agents would show no care in preserving any of the materials, but pitched of[f] the stones from the battlements to the ground” Destruction was more extensive two years later, when Algernon Percy, 10th Earl of Northumberland, was ordered to demolish everything that remain except the south range of the castle. The earl would be allowed to use the surviving range as a manor house. The damage was not confined to the castle buildings, and probably affected the ornamental landscape.

The castle remained with the Percy family until the mid-18th century when it passed to the earls of Egremont. The lands and castle were then inherited by Elizabeth Seymour who assumed the name Percy and was later Duchess of Northumberland. Wressle Castle was occupied by a tenant farmer who on 19 February 1796 caused a fire which gutted the castle's remaining wing. He had been trying to clear the chimney. A report three months later in The Gentleman's Magazine noted that “This loss was of truly national significance". The farm continued to be leased to tenants, and the farmhouse which still stands was built c. 1810. By 1880 the castle was partially covered in ivy. In 1957 the castle and farm were sold to the Falkingham family who own the site today.

== Conservation and management ==
Wressle Castle is now a Grade I listed ruin and a scheduled monument. The remains include earthworks indicating the moat, and some parts of the castle: the remains of the two towers of the south range; and a building fragment, thought to have been a bakehouse.

According to Historic England, the site was first investigated archaeologically in 1993, when Humberside Archaeology Unit held a watching brief. The state of the site deteriorated to the point at which in 1999 Wressle Castle was included on the Heritage at Risk Register. Historic England, Natural England and the Country Houses Foundation invested £500,000 in repairing the castle and in 2015 Wressle was no longer considered ‘at risk’ and was removed from the register. This included architectural and landscape surveys carried out by Ed Dennison Archaeological Services, with funding from the Castle Studies Trust for the landscape survey.

As part of the conservation and repair work, ecological surveys were carried out. They found four different species of bat at the site across 20 roosting locations. Repair work was timed to minimise the impact on the bats, and some cracks were left as they were so that they could continue to be used as roosts.

== Architecture ==
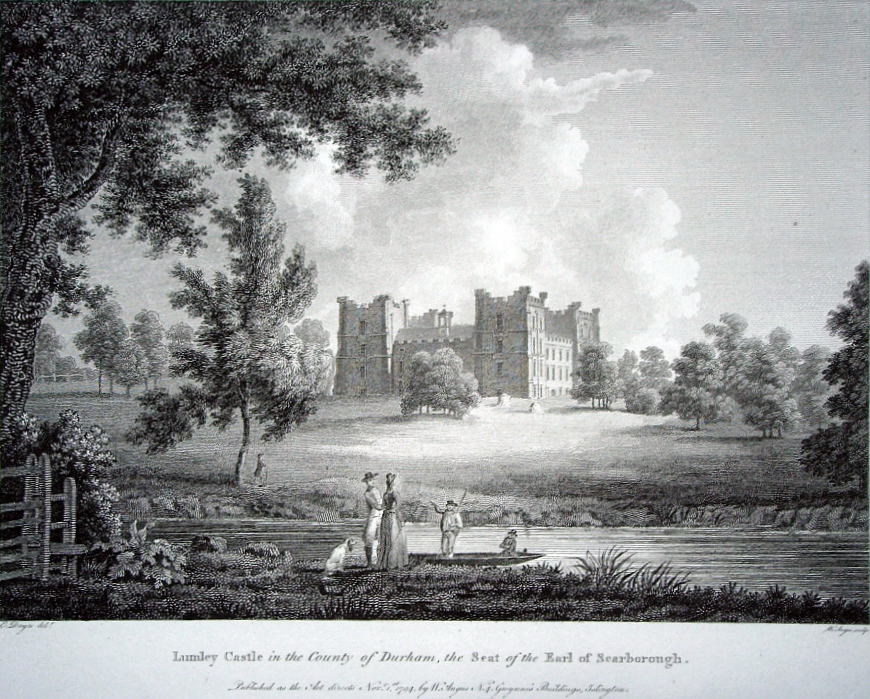
An 18th-century engraving of Lumley Castle, which may have been designed by the same architect as Wressle.

A quadrangular castle, Wressle Castle was laid out with four ranges in a square around a courtyard. At each corner was a tower, and in the centre of the east side was a five-storey gatehouse. Clockwise from north east the corner towers were named the Constable Tower (where the constable who ran the castle on a daily basis lived), the Chapel Tower, the Lord's Tower, and the Kitchen Tower. Opposite the gatehouse, in the castle's west range, was the great hall and the Lord's Tower in the south west contained the owner's accommodation and private rooms. The historian John Goodall contrasted the castle's interior and exterior appearance, writing "it is austerely detailed to give an outward impression of strength. This treatment was appropriate to a castle and set off the opulence of the interiors".

The Chapel Tower contained the castle chapel which spanned two storeys, with the 'Lady's Chamber' and a library above. The 'Lady's Chamber' is the only explicitly space for women in the castle.

Based on architectural similarities with the castles of Sheriff Hutton, Bolton, and Lumley, historian Eric John Fisher suggested that Wressle Castle was built in the last quarter of the 14th century. This coincides with the career of John Lewyn, who designed the great tower at Warkworth Castle and worked at Lumley, both Percy properties. Archaeologist Malcolm Hislop suggests that Lewyn also designed Wressle, and that "it is difficult to believe that [Lumley and Wressle] were designed independently of each other."

== Landscape ==
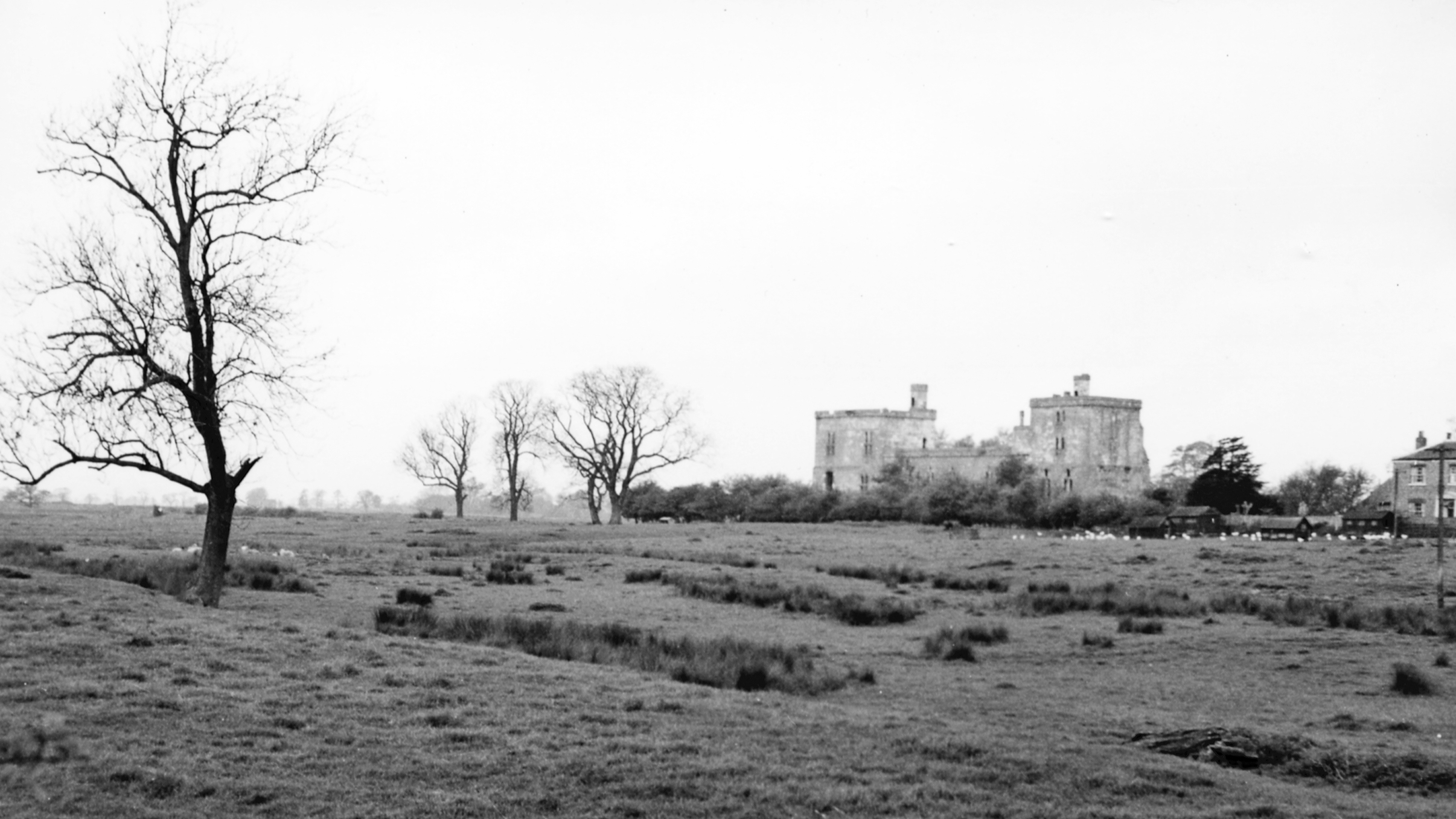
Wressle Castle from the south east in 1961. Between the camera and the castle lie the earthworks of what probably used to be part of the village. Beyond that would have been the outer garden.

External videos
- Wressle Castle, East Yorkshire: Beginning to End, talk given by Shaun Richardson to the Royal Archaeological Institute in 2016

The village of Wressle pre-dates the castle, and was recorded in the Domesday Book in 1086. The castle was built at the west end of the settlement on one of the two main roads through Wressle. It is unclear whether this was a manorial centre before the castle was built, or whether it was an entirely new site. The castle was given multiple gardens which likely resulted in some parts of the village being built over. The River Derwent flows north–south about 590 feet (180 m) west of the castle.

The gardens at Wressle Castle were probably created at the same time as the castle was built. Documentary evidence indicates that by the late-15th century Wressle Castle had two gardens, both located to the south of the castle. One was probably between the south moat and the castle (the Moat Garden) and the other was south of the moat (the Old Garden). A third garden (the New Garden) was laid out north of the castle around 1472–1517. The Old and New Gardens covered about 1 acre (4,000 m^{2}) each; the former had a brick wall while the later was enclosed by a wet moat. The Old Garden contained an orchard and alleys for bowling and walking, popular pastimes of the nobility from the 16th century onwards. It also contained a two-storey 15th-century building known as the ‘School House’ where Henry Percy, 5th Earl of Northumberland, would read.

A banqueting house was built just inside the south-west corner of the moat. Though it was probably built in the 16th century, it was in a dilapidated state by 1577. A base court (an enclosed area) was added in front of the castle's gatehouse after the main complex was built, but it unclear when. Wetland areas south and east of the castle may have been used to emulate a mere, a type of broad shallow lake. As well as this, there were two fishponds, but their dating is uncertain. During Wressle Castle's heyday in the 16th century, the quality of the gardens and ornamental landscape would have paralleled the interior of the renovated buildings, possibly even rivalling gardens at royal properties.

== See also ==
- Castles in Great Britain and Ireland
- List of castles in England
- Grade I listed buildings in the East Riding of Yorkshire
- Listed buildings in Wressle

== Bibliography ==
- Brears, Peter (2010), "Wressle Castle: Functions, Fixtures and Furnishings for Henry Percy 'The Magnificent' fifth Earl of Northumberland, 1498–1527", The Archaeological Journal, 167: 55–114, doi:10.1080/00665983.2010.11020793, S2CID 161565669
- Brown, A. L. (2008). "Percy, Thomas, earl of Worcester (c.1343–1403)". Oxford Dictionary of National Biography. Oxford Dictionary of National Biography (online ed.). Oxford University Press. doi:10.1093/ref:odnb/21955. (Subscription, Wikipedia Library access or UK public library membership required.)
- Emery, Anthony (1996), Greater Medieval Houses of England and Wales: Volume I Northern England, Cambridge University Press, ISBN 9780521497237
- Fisher, Eric John (1954), Some Yorkshire estates of the Percies, 1450–1650 (phd), University of Leeds (PhD thesis)
- Goodall, John (2022), The Castle: A History, Yale University Press, ISBN 9780300251906
- Hislop, Malcolm J. B. (2007), John Lewyn of Durham: A Medieval Mason in Practice, BAR British Series 438, doi:10.30861/9781407300665, ISBN 978-1-4073-0066-5
- Hoyle, R. W. (2001), The Pilgrimage of Grace and the Politics of the 1530s, Oxford University Press, ISBN 0-19-820874-X
- Hoyle, R. W. (2008a). "Percy, Henry Algernon, fifth earl of Northumberland (1478–1527)". Oxford Dictionary of National Biography. Oxford Dictionary of National Biography (online ed.). Oxford University Press. doi:10.1093/ref:odnb/21936. (Subscription, Wikipedia Library access or UK public library membership required.)
- Hoyle, R. W. (2008b). "Percy, Henry Algernon, sixth earl of Northumberland (c.1502–1537)". Oxford Dictionary of National Biography. Oxford Dictionary of National Biography (online ed.). Oxford University Press. doi:10.1093/ref:odnb/21937. (Subscription, Wikipedia Library access or UK public library membership required.)
- Johnson, Matthew (2002), Behind the Castle Gate: From Medieval to Renaissance, Routledge, ISBN 0-415-25887-1
- Neave, David (1984), "Wressle Castle", The Archaeological Journal, 141: 58–60
- Pevsner, Nikolaus; Neave, David (2002). Yorkshire: York and the East Riding. The Buildings of England. Yale University Press.
- Rakoczy, Lila (2007), Archaeology of destruction: a reinterpretation of castle slightings in the English Civil War (PhD), University of York (PhD thesis)
- Richardson, Shaun; Dennison, Ed (2014–15), "Wressle Castle, East Yorkshire: Gardens Survey Interim Summary", The Castle Studies Group Journal, 28: 190–198
- Richardson, Shaun; Dennison, Ed (2015), Garden and Other Earthworks, South of Wressle Castle, Wressle, East Yorkshire: Archaeological Survey (PDF), Ed Dennison Archaeological Services and the Castle Studies Trust
