= Listed buildings in Wressle =

Wressle is a civil parish in the county of the East Riding of Yorkshire, England. It contains nine listed buildings that are recorded in the National Heritage List for England. Of these, one is listed at Grade I, the highest of the three grades, one is at Grade II*, the middle grade, and the others are at Grade II, the lowest grade. The parish contains the village of Wressle and the surrounding countryside. The most important building in the parish is Wressle Castle, a ruined castle, which is listed together with associated structures. The other listed buildings consist of farmhouses, a barn, a house, a church, and a disused windmill.

== Key ==
Grade	Criteria
I	Buildings of exceptional interest, sometimes considered to be internationally important
II*	Particularly important buildings of more than special interest
II	Buildings of national importance and special interest

== Buildings ==
Name and location	Photograph	Date	Notes	Grade
Wressle Castle; 53.77552°N 0.92885°W		Late 14th century	The remaining south range of a quadrangular castle in magnesian limestone with repairs in brick, and now a ruin. It consists of the Lord's Tower to the west and the Chapel Tower to the west, linked by a lower central range. The Lord's Tower has three storeys, the Chapel Tower has four, and the central range is mainly in three storeys. The building contains many windows, including an oriel window on the Lord's Tower.	I
Bakehouse, Wressle Castle; 53.77574°N 0.92914°W	—	c. 1380	The former bakehouse to the north of the castle is in stone, with a square plan, and is a ruin. There is a single storey, and it contains a pointed doorway, springers for a vault, and an embattled parapet, partly blocked.	II*
Ruined walling, Wressle Castle; 53.77574°N 0.92818°W	—	16th century (probable)	The walling to the east of the castle is in red brick, and is about 30 metres (98 ft) in length, and 2 metres (6 ft 7 in) in height. It contains an arch in red brick, and attached to it is a cell about 15 metres (49 ft) in diameter, lined with brick and with a doorway.	II
Holly Cottage; 53.77604°N 0.92385°W	—	Mid-18th century	The house is in brick, partly rendered, with a dentilled eaves course, and a pantile roof. There is a single storey and attics, and three bays. On the front is a doorway flanked by casement windows, with a horizontally sliding sash window on the extreme left. All the openings have cambered brick arches. Inside, there is a large inglenook with a cambered bressumer.	II
Long barn, Castle Farm; 53.77593°N 0.92740°W	—	Late 18th century	The barn is in brick, with a dentilled eaves course, and a pantile roof with two courses of stone slate, coped gables and shaped kneelers. There are two storeys and eight bays, and it is about 85 feet (26 m) in length. The barn contains three round arches, doorway, one under a cambered brick arch, and another one pointed, a window under a cambered brick arch, and slit vents. On the upper floor are fixed windows and a pitching door.	II
Rowland Hall; 53.76868°N 0.90209°W		Late 18th century	The farmhouse is in brick, with stone dressings, a floor band, and hipped roofs in tile and slate. There are two storeys, and three bays, and flanking single-storey two-bay wings. The middle bay projects under a gable containing an oval oculus. It contains a doorcase with attached Doric columns, impost blocks and an open pediment, and a doorway with a radial fanlight. The windows are sashes with wedge lintels and keystones.	II
Castle Farmhouse; 53.77563°N 0.92756°W	—	c. 1796	The farmhouse is in brick, with a dentilled eaves course, and a hipped Westmorland slate roof. There are two storeys, a square plan, and three bays. In the centre is a pedimented timber porch on tapering square piers, a doorcase with fluted pilasters and a fluted frieze, and a doorway with a radial fanlight. The windows are sashes, most tripartite, under flat gauged brick arches.	II
St John of Beverley's Church; 53.77291°N 0.92756°W		1799	The church, which was altered in 1873, is in brick on a stone plinth, with stone dressings and a Westmorland slate roof. It consists of a three-bay nave, a south porch, a north vestry, a long single-bay chancel, and a slim west tower. The tower has three stages, bands, slit windows, and round-headed bell openings with a sill band, above which is a stone cornice and an embattled parapet. The doorway and most of the windows have pointed heads.	II
Windmill tower 53.77181°N 0.92421°W		19th century	The disused windmill at Mill Farm is in brick, and consists of a tapering round tower. It has four-storeys, and contains double doors and fixed windows.	II
