= Wressle =

Village and civil parish in the East Riding of Yorkshire, England

Coordinates: 53.775682°N 0.924430°W

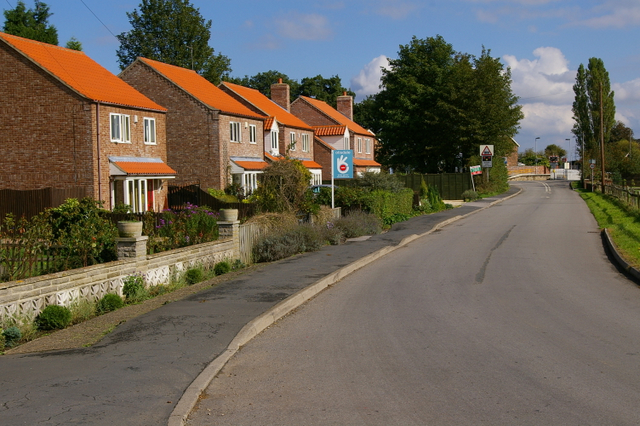
- The main road through Wressle

- Location within the East Riding of Yorkshire
- Population: 271 (2011 census)
- OS grid reference: SE709315
  - London: 160 mi (260 km) S
- Civil parish: Wressle
- Unitary authority: East Riding of Yorkshire
- Ceremonial county: East Riding of Yorkshire
- Region: Yorkshire and the Humber
- Country: England
- Sovereign state: United Kingdom
- Post town: SELBY
- Postcode district: YO8
- Dialling code: 01757
- Police: Humberside
- Fire: Humberside
- Ambulance: Yorkshire
- UK Parliament: Goole and Pocklington

Wressle (with spelling variations of Wressell, and Wressel, in Leland's Itinerary as Wreshil, in the Domesday Book as Weresa) is a village and civil parish in the East Riding of Yorkshire, England, lying on the eastern bank of the River Derwent approximately 3 miles (5 km) north-west of Howden.

Wressle village has a late 18th-century church, St John, and on the western fringe of the village is the Grade I listed structure and scheduled monument, the ruins of Wressle Castle. Wressle railway station is located within the village.

The parish includes the hamlets of Brind, Newsholme and Loftshome. Wressle lies within the Parliamentary constituency of Goole and Pocklington.

== Geography ==
The civil parish of Wressle is bounded by the civil parishes of Hemingbrough and Cliffe in the county of North Yorkshire to the west, separated by the River Derwent; by Bubwith to the north, separated by the Fleet Dike; by Spaldington and Howden to the east; and by Asselby and Barmby on the Marsh to the south.

The civil parish contains Wressle and the hamlets of Brind and Newsholme. The place of Loftsome lies less than 0.6 miles (1 km) south of Wressle on the bank of the Derwent. The Hull to Selby railway line runs east–west through the parish, passing Wressle on the southern edge, and the A63 also passes east–west through the southern part of the parish, skirting Newsholme, and passing Loftsome Bridge. The parish contains predominately agricultural land at around 16 feet (5 m) above sea level.

According to the 2011 UK Census, Wressle parish had a population of 271, an increase on the 2001 UK Census figure of 261.

== History ==
=== Wressle Castle ===
Wressle Castle was a quadrangular castle originally was built for Thomas Percy in around 1380. It is ruinous and not open to the public.

=== Wressle village ===
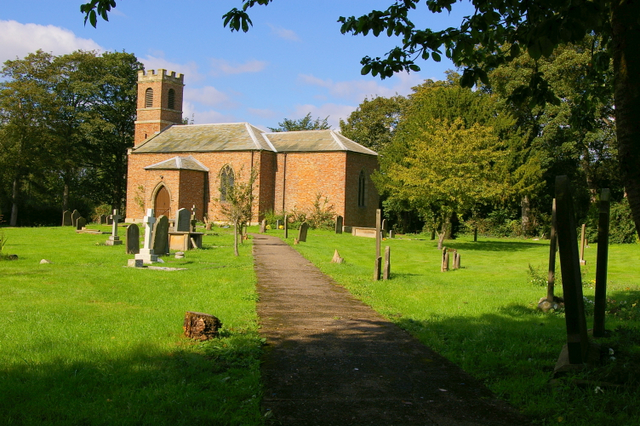
The Church of St John of Beverley, built in 1799

The name Wressle derives from the Old English wrǣsel meaning 'twisted' or 'knotted'. This could be in reference to the topography of the area, or of a twisting river.

Wressle was listed as a Manor (Weresa) in the Domesday Book of 1086.

An early church is thought to have been destroyed during the English Civil War as it represented a potential fortification; church services were then held in the chapel in the remains of Wressle Castle, until that was destroyed by fire (1796). The parish church of St John of Beverley, now a Grade II listed building, was built in 1799 of brick with stone dressings, as a replacement.

Other 18th-century buildings still extant include the Castle Farmhouse (1796) built to house the farmer after the fire in Wressle Castle; and the Long Barn (late 18th century) near to the castle site, Holly Cottage in Wressle village (mid-18th century); all built of brick. Rowland Hall, east of the village was built in the late 18th century in brick with stone dressings and is now Grade II listed.

In 1840 the Hull and Selby Railway was opened, passing south of Wressle, with a cast-iron bridge over the Derwent; services calling at Wressle are recorded as early as 1843, with a full train service at Wressle station by 1855. A school with an attached schoolmaster's house was erected in 1854.

A windmill was built at Mill Farm, east of the village church, in the 19th century; by 1890 it was out of use.

On 1 April 1935 the parish of "Wressell" was abolished and merged with South Duffield to form "Wressle". At the 1931 census (the last before the abolition of the parish), Wressell had a population of 275.

The village has had minimal urban growth in the industrial and modern age. In 1997 planning permission was obtained for a new small street of 5 houses off Main Street, named 'Derwent Court'.

=== Loftsome ===
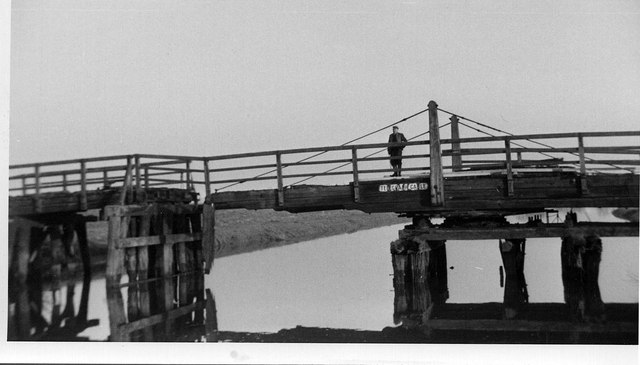
The Loftsome toll swing bridge

Loftsome and Loftsome Bridge were small hamlets in the parish of Wressle.

Since at least 1339, the Derwent was once crossed by a ferry at Loftsome.

In 1804, a swing bridge crossing of the Derwent was built at Loftsome, operated as a toll bridge.

In the early 1800s, an inn opened at Loftsome Bridge.

By 1823, the inn was known as the Loftsome Bridge Inn.

In the 1870s, Loftsome's population was 20.

In the early 1930s, the original Loftsome Bridge was replaced by a new bridge that was built for the Hull-Selby road (part of the A63).

In the early 1980s, in the parish of Barmby on the Marsh, Yorkshire Water constructed a water supply treatment works called "Loftsome Water Treatment Works" that was approximately 1 km (3,300 ft; 0.62 mi) south-west of Loftsome on the banks of the Derwent.

In 1994, the Loftsome site was refurbished and upgraded to include ozone treatment, giving a capacity of 114,000 m^{3} (4,000,000 cu ft) per day.

In 2005 and 2006, the site added additional treatment units to deal with increased pesticide and trihalomethane content from the Derwent.

In the late 2000s, Yorkshire Water had two 1.3 MW wind turbines installed at its site in Loftsome.

== See also ==
- Listed buildings in Wressle
