= Newsholme, East Riding of Yorkshire =

Hamlet in the East Riding of Yorkshire, England

Coordinates: 53.758698°N 0.909999°W

Newsholme
- Location within the East Riding of Yorkshire
- OS grid reference: SE719297
  - London: 160 mi (260 km) S
- Civil parish: Wressle
- Unitary authority: East Riding of Yorkshire
- Ceremonial county: East Riding of Yorkshire
- Region: Yorkshire and the Humber
- Country: England
- Sovereign state: United Kingdom
- Post town: GOOLE
- Postcode district: DN14
- Dialling code: 01757
- Police: Humberside
- Fire: Humberside
- Ambulance: Yorkshire
- UK Parliament: Goole and Pocklington

Newsholme is a hamlet in the East Riding of Yorkshire, England. It is situated approximately 2 miles (3.2 km) north-west of the market town of Howden and lies on the north side of the A63 road.

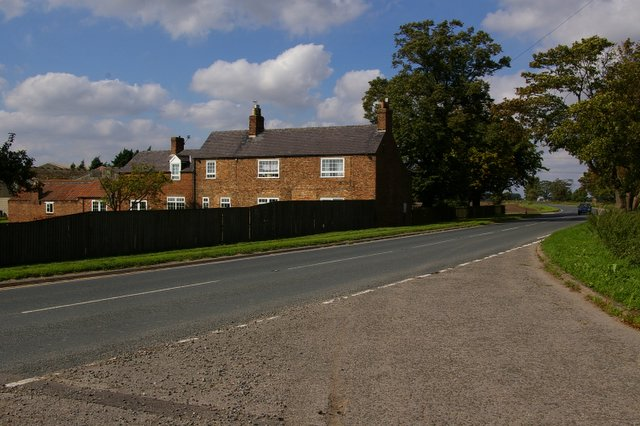
A63 at Newsholme looking North West

It forms part of the civil parish of Wressle.

In 1823 Newsholme with Brind was in the parish of Wressle, the Wapentake of Harthill and the Liberty of Howdenshire. Population at the time was 177.

The name Newsholme derives from the plural form of the Old English nīwehūs meaning 'new house'.
